= Deaths in August 2013 =

The following is a list of notable deaths in August 2013.

Entries for each day are listed alphabetically by surname. A typical entry lists information in the following sequence:

- Name, age, country of citizenship and reason for notability, established cause of death, reference.

== August 2013 ==
=== 1 ===
- John Amis, 91, British broadcaster, classical music critic and writer.
- John Blumsky, 84, New Zealand broadcaster and journalist.
- Chua Boon Huat, 33, Malaysian Olympic field hockey player, traffic collision.
- John Dengate, 74, Australian folk singer and songwriter.
- Arthur J. England Jr., 80, American judge, member of the Florida Supreme Court (1975–1981).
- Mike Hinton, 57, American guitarist, cancer.
- Dick Kazmaier, 82, American football player and businessman, winner of the Heisman Trophy (1951), heart and lung disease.
- Gail Kobe, 81, American actress (Peyton Place, Gunsmoke) and producer (The Bold and the Beautiful).
- Bob Livingstone, 91, American football player.
- Ritham Madubun, 42, Indonesian footballer, stroke.
- Babe Martin, 93, American baseball player (St. Louis Browns).
- Colin McAdam, 61, Scottish footballer (Dumbarton).
- Tomasz Nowak, 52, Polish Olympic boxer.
- P. V. Ranga Rao, 73, Indian politician, heart disease.
- Toby Saks, 71, American cellist, founder of the Seattle Chamber Music Society, pancreatic cancer.
- Seyran Valiyev, 62, Azerbaijani paleogeographer and historian.
- Wilford White, 84, American football player (Chicago Bears, Toronto Argonauts), natural causes.

=== 2 ===
- Patricia Anthony, 66, American science fiction author.
- Julius L. Chambers, 76, American lawyer and civil rights activist.
- V. Dakshinamoorthy, 93, Indian carnatic musician and music director.
- Richard E. Dauch, 71, American automotive executive, co-founder of American Axle, cancer.
- Kurt Ehrmann, 91, German Olympic footballer.
- Ola Enstad, 70, Norwegian sculptor.
- Fernando Flávio Marques de Almeida, 97, Brazilian geologist.
- Peter Goldstone, 86, British solicitor and judge.
- George Hauptfuhrer, 87, American lawyer and basketball player.
- Raymond E. Joslin, 76, American television executive (Hearst Corporation), stomach cancer.
- Alla Kushnir, 71, Russian-born Israeli chess grandmaster.
- Par Par Lay, 67, Burmese comedian and satirist, prostate cancer.
- Thomas McAnea, 63, Scottish master counterfeiter, lung cancer.
- Quincy Murphy, 60, American politician, member of the Georgia House of Representatives (since 2002), cancer.
- David Nalle, 88, American diplomat, writer and lecturer, editor of the Central Asia Monitor.
- Joe F. Smith, 94, American politician, Mayor of Charleston, West Virginia (1980–1983), member of the West Virginia House of Delegates (1997–2002).
- Barbara Trentham, 68, American actress (Rollerball), complications from leukemia.
- Pixie Williams, 85, New Zealand singer, complications from dementia, diabetes and Parkinson's disease.

=== 3 ===
- Yuri Brezhnev, 80, Russian Soviet politician.
- John Coombs, 91, British racing driver and team owner.
- Les Cooper, 92, American doo wop musician.
- Dixie Evans, 86, American burlesque dancer, stroke.
- Jack Hightower, 86, American politician, member of the Texas House of Representatives (1953–1955), Senator (1965–1974), member of the U.S. House of Representatives from Texas (1975–1985).
- Jack Hynes, 92, Scottish-born American footballer.
- Marina Kalashnikova, Russian historian and journalist, cancer.
- Eiichi Kawatei, 79, Japanese sports executive (ITF, ATF), led push to return tennis to Olympics in 1988, heart failure.
- Samuel Lamb, 88, Chinese Christian pastor.
- Georgine Loacker, 87, American scholar.
- Rose Morat, 107, American centenarian and assault victim.
- Joy Onaolapo, 30, Nigerian champion Paralympic weightlifter (2012). (death announced on this date)
- John Palmer, 77, American journalist and news anchor (NBC News), pulmonary fibrosis.
- Duane J. Roth, 63, American pharmaceutical and technology executive, CEO of CONNECT, complications from injuries in bicycle collision.
- Dutch Savage, 78, American professional wrestler and promoter, complications from stroke.
- Suthee Singhasaneh, 85, Thai politician, Senator and MP, Minister of Finance (1986–1988, 1991–1992).
- Ronald Siwani, 32, South African cricketer.
- Donald Ungurait, 76, American acamedic.
- Arline Usden, 75, British journalist.
- Iryna Zhylenko, 72, Ukrainian poet.

=== 4 ===
- Betty Babcock, 91, American politician, First Lady of Montana (1962–1969), member of Montana House of Representatives (1975–1977).
- Keith H. Basso, 73, American anthropologist, cancer.
- Sherko Bekas, 73, Iraqi Kurdish poet.
- Yitzhak Berman, 100, Ukrainian-born Israeli politician, member of the Knesset (1977–1984), Speaker (1980–1981), Minister of Energy and Water Resources (1981–1982).
- John Billingham, 83, British-born American space executive (NASA), chief of life science at Ames Research Center.
- Ronny Bruckner, 56, Belgian businessman.
- Wilf Carter, 79, English footballer (Plymouth Argyle), cancer.
- Inmaculada Cruz, 52, Spanish politician, member of the Senate (since 2011), cancer.
- Art Donovan, 89, American football player (Baltimore Colts), inducted into Pro Football Hall of Fame (1968), respiratory ailment.
- Dominick Harrod, 72, British journalist, BBC economics correspondent, complications from a fall.
- Bill Hoskyns, 82, British Olympic silver-medalist fencer (1960, 1964).
- Norris Hoyt, 76, American politician, member of the Vermont House of Representatives (1975–1983).
- Daniel Kan, 86, Dutch mathematician.
- Srđan Marilović, 45, Serbian sprint canoer.
- Olavi J. Mattila, 94, Finnish politician.
- Charles Molette, 95, French Roman Catholic priest and archivist.
- David Plawecki, 65, American politician, member of the Michigan Senate (1970–1982).
- Des Raj, 69, Indian cricket umpire.
- Renato Ruggiero, 83, Italian politician, Minister of Foreign Affairs (2001–2002), Director General of World Trade Organization (1995–1999).
- Jasjit Singh, 79, Indian military officer, air commodore (Institute for Defence Studies and Analyses).
- Tony Snell, 91, British RAF fighter pilot.
- Fritz Stange, 76, German Olympic wrestler.
- Stanisław Targosz, 65, Polish military officer, commanding general of the Polish Air Force (2005–2007).
- Charles-Omer Valois, 89, Canadian Roman Catholic prelate, Bishop of Saint-Jérôme (1977–1997).
- Billy Ward, 20, Australian Olympic boxer (2012), suicide.
- Kramer Williamson, 63, American sprint car racing driver, inducted into National Sprint Car Hall of Fame (2008), race collision.
- Sir John Forster Woodward, 81, British military officer, Royal Navy admiral (Falklands War).
- Tim Wright, 63, American bass guitarist (Pere Ubu, DNA), cancer.

=== 5 ===
- Ruth Asawa, 87, American sculptor, natural causes.
- Malcolm Barrass, 88, English footballer (Bolton Wanderers), dementia.
- İnal Batu, 76, Turkish politician and diplomat, Ambassador to the UN and Italy, MP (1997–1999).
- Shawn Burr, 47, Canadian ice hockey player (Detroit Red Wings, San Jose Sharks), complications from a fall.
- Jaime Luiz Coelho, 97, Brazilian Roman Catholic prelate, Bishop and Archbishop of Maringá (1956–1997).
- George Duke, 67, American Grammy Award-winning jazz fusion keyboardist, chronic lymphocytic leukemia.
- Willie Dunn, 71, Canadian Mi'kmaq folk singer, film maker, songwriter and First Nations activist.
- Kenneth John Frost, 78, American astrophysicist.
- Robert Häusser, 88, German photographer.
- Joseph Lehner, 100, American mathematician.
- Lin Chieh-liang, 55, Taiwanese physician and toxicologist, pneumonia and multiple organ failure.
- Hector Luisi, 94, Uruguayan politician, Foreign Minister (1967–1968), Ambassador to the United States (1985–1990).
- Qaqambile Matanzima, 63, South African tribal leader and politician, stabbed.
- Mohamed Ezzedine Mili, 95, Tunisian telecommunications engineer, Secretary General of ITU (1967–1982).
- Quraish Pur, 81, Pakistani scholar, writer and television host.
- Roy Rubin, 87, American basketball coach (Philadelphia 76ers, Long Island University).
- Frank Valdor, 75, German band leader.
- May Song Vang, 62, Laotian-born American Hmong community leader, widow of General Vang Pao, complications from cancer.
- Len Watson, 85, New Zealand cricketer.
- Rob Wyda, 54, American judge, commander of U.S. Navy Reserve JAG Corps, heart attack.

=== 6 ===
- Steve Aizlewood, 60, Welsh footballer (Newport County, Portsmouth).
- Dino Ballacci, 89, Italian football player and manager.
- Ze'ev Ben-Haim, 105, Israeli linguist.
- Marco Bucci, 52, Italian Olympic discus thrower (1984), heart attack.
- Jeremy Geidt, 83, British-born American stage actor and acting coach (Harvard University), co-founder of the American Repertory Theater, heart attack.
- John Kingsmill, 92, Australian author.
- Lidia Korsakówna, 79, Polish actress.
- Luis de Jesús Lima, 68, Guatemalan radio journalist, homicide.
- Martin Geoffrey Low, 63, British biologist.
- Stan Lynde, 81, American cartoonist (Rick O'Shay, Latigo), cancer.
- Earlene Roberts, 77, American politician, member of the New Mexico House of Representatives (1989–2005).
- Mava Lee Thomas, 83, American baseball player (Fort Wayne Daisies), Alzheimer's disease.
- Dave Wagstaffe, 70, English footballer (Wolverhampton Wanderers, Manchester City, Blackburn Rovers).
- Jerry Wolman, 86, American football team owner (Philadelphia Eagles, 1963–1969) and hockey team owner (Philadelphia Flyers).
- Selçuk Yula, 53, Turkish footballer, heart attack.

=== 7 ===
- Samuel G. Armistead, 85, American linguist.
- Zev Asher, 50, Canadian experimental musician and filmmaker, cancer.
- David Braybrooke, 88, American political philosopher, complication following cancer surgery.
- Buurtpoes Bledder, 1–2, domestic cat in Netherlands, motor accident.
- Roy Davies, 79, Welsh Anglican prelate, Bishop of Llandaff (1985–1999).
- Ernest Hartmann, 79, Austrian-American psychoanalyst, heart failure.
- Thomas Fee, 82, American politician, member of the Pennsylvania House of Representatives (1970–1994).
- Almir Kayumov, 48, Russian football player and referee, suicide by vehicular impact.
- David Leighton, 91, American Episcopalian prelate, Bishop of Maryland (1972–1985).
- Hélène Loiselle, 85, Canadian actress, Alzheimer's disease.
- Elisabeth Maxwell, 92, French holocaust scholar, widow of Robert Maxwell.
- Paul Mercier, 89, Canadian politician, MP for Blainville—Deux-Montagnes (1993–1997) and Terrebonne—Blainville (1997–2000).
- Hiroshi Ogawa, 62, Japanese animator (Crayon Shin-chan, Lupin III), colon infection.
- Tony Pawson, 60, Canadian genetic researcher, expert in cell communication.
- Margaret Pellegrini, 89, American actress (The Wizard of Oz), complications of a stroke.
- Sean Sasser, 44, American HIV activist, educator and reality TV personality (The Real World: San Francisco), mesothelioma.
- Pat Sheahan, 85, New Zealand Rugby Union player and publican.
- Luís Gonzaga Ferreira da Silva, 90, Portuguese-born Mozambican Roman Catholic prelate, Bishop of Lichinga (1972–2003).
- Abhay Pratap Singh, 76, Indian politician.
- Keith Skillen, 65, English footballer (Workington A.F.C.), motor neurone disease.
- William Stack, 76, British Olympic boxer.
- Vasily Tikhonov, 55, Russian ice hockey coach, fall.
- Meeli Truu, 67, Estonian architect.
- Alexander Yagubkin, 52, Russian boxer, world amateur heavyweight champion (1982).

=== 8 ===
- Les Ascott, 91, Canadian football player (Toronto Argonauts).
- Chikondi Banda, 33, Malawian footballer, complications of malaria.
- Karen Black, 74, American actress (Five Easy Pieces, Nashville, Easy Rider), ampullary cancer.
- Johannes Bluyssen, 87, Dutch Roman Catholic prelate, Bishop of Den Bosch (1966–1983).
- Fernando Castro Pacheco, 95, Mexican artist and teacher.
- Jack Clement, 82, American record and film producer, songwriter and singer (Sun Records, Johnny Cash, Jerry Lee Lewis, U2), liver cancer.
- Al Coury, 78, American music executive, complications from a stroke.
- Petar Georgiev, 48, Bulgarian Olympic gymnast.
- Nicolae Gheorghe, 66, Romanian anthropologist and Roma activist, colon cancer.
- Johnny Hamilton, 78, Scottish footballer.
- Derek Hockridge, 79, British actor and translator (Asterix).
- Jiří Krejčík, 95, Czech film director (Divine Emma), screenwriter and actor (Cosy Dens).
- Igor Kurnosov, 28, Russian chess grandmaster, traffic collision.
- Jimmy McColl, 88, Scottish Olympic footballer (1948).
- Joseph M. McLaughlin, 80, American judge, member of the US District for Eastern NY (1981–1990), US Court of Appeals – Second Circuit (since 1990), pneumonia.
- Barbara Mertz, 85, American mystery writer (The Last Camel Died at Noon).
- John Rankine, 94, British science fiction author.
- Regina Resnik, 90, American operatic mezzo-soprano.
- Juana Marta Rodas, 88, Paraguayan ceramist.
- Jaymala Shiledar, 86, Indian singer and actor, multiple organ failure.
- Léon Aimé Taverdet, 90, French Roman Catholic prelate, Bishop of Langres (1981–1999).
- Ios Teper, 98, Australian Ukrainian-born Soviet military officer, awarded Order of the Red Banner for Battle of Berlin.
- James Sterling Young, 85, American historian and academic.
- Graham Usher, 54, British foreign correspondent, Creutzfeldt-Jakob disease.

=== 9 ===
- Hezekiah Braxton, 79, American football player.
- Lester Fuess Eastman, 85, American physicist, engineer and educator.
- Harry Elliott, 89, American baseball player (St. Louis Cardinals).
- Eduardo Falú, 90, Argentine guitarist and composer.
- Leo Fraser, 86, American politician, member of the New Hampshire House of Representatives (1985–1991), Senate (1991–2001), leukemia.
- Haji, 67, Canadian actress (Faster, Pussycat! Kill! Kill!).
- Glen Hobbie, 77, American baseball player (Chicago Cubs, St. Louis Cardinals).
- Ruthe Jackson, 92, American community organizer and broadcaster.
- Lou Killen, 79, British musician, folk singer (The Clancy Brothers) and songwriter, cancer.
- Johnny Logan, 87, American baseball player (Milwaukee Braves, Pittsburgh Pirates).
- William Lynch Jr., 72, American politician, complications related to kidney disease.
- Brian Moll, 88, British-born Australian actor (A Country Practice, Street Fighter).
- Ishtiaq Mubarak, 65, Malaysian Olympic hurdler (1968, 1972, 1976) and coach.
- Phill Nixon, 57, British darts player, cancer.
- John Oakley, 88, New Zealand cricketer.
- Urbano Tavares Rodrigues, 89, Portuguese academic and author.
- John H. Ross, 95, American military officer, Reconnaissance Army Air Corps pilot decorated for the Battle of the Bulge.
- Vladimir Vikulov, 67, Russian Olympic champion ice hockey player (1968, 1972).
- Anup Lal Yadav, 89, Indian politician, MP for Saharsa, Bihar MLA for Triveniganj.

=== 10 ===
- Batile Alake, 78, Nigerian waka singer.
- William P. Clark Jr., 81, American civil servant, National Security Advisor (1982–1983), Secretary of the Interior (1983–1985), Parkinson's disease.
- László Csatáry, 98, Hungarian police commander, convicted Nazi war criminal, pneumonia.
- Jonathan Dawson, 71, Australian filmmaker, critic and historian.
- Eydie Gormé, 84, American singer ("Blame It on the Bossa Nova").
- David C. Jones, 92, American USAF general, Chief of Staff of the Air Force (1974–1978), Chairman of the Joint Chiefs of Staff (1978–1982), Parkinson's disease.
- Somdet Kiaw, 85, Thai Buddhist prelate, acting Supreme Patriarch of Thailand, Abbot of Wat Saket (since 2004), blood infection.
- Calvin Ledbetter Jr., 84, American politician and academic, member of the Arkansas House of Representatives (1967–1976).
- Sir Quo-wei Lee, 95, Hong Kong banker, chairman of Hang Seng Bank Ltd., unofficial member of the Executive and Legislative Councils.
- Ahmed Mustafa, 69, Pakistani cricketer, Parkinson's disease.
- Jody Payne, 77, American musician (Willie Nelson's Family), heart failure.
- Joaquim Rufino do Rêgo, 87, Brazilian Roman Catholic prelate, Bishop of Quixadá (1971–1986) and Parnaíba (1986–2001).
- Allan Sekula, 62, American artist, cancer.
- Tan Ah Eng, 58, Malaysian politician, MP for Gelang Patah (2004–2012), brain cancer.
- Bob Thomas, 87, American politician and newspaper columnist, member of the Nevada Assembly (1982–1988).
- Amy Wallace, 58, American writer, heart condition.

=== 11 ===
- Comrade Alipio, Peruvian guerrilla leader.
- George Barasch, 102, American labor union leader.
- Bob Bignall, 91, Australian Olympic soccer player (1956).
- Penelope Casas, 70, American food author, pioneer of Spanish cuisine in the United States, complications from leukemia.
- Charles Nelson Corey, 98, American football coach.
- Raymond Delisle, 70, French racing cyclist, suicide.
- Jean Bethke Elshtain, 72, American philosopher and academic, complications from heart failure.
- Don Friedman, 83, American politician and radio talk show host, member of the Colorado House of Representatives (1962–1976).
- Zafar Futehally, 93, Indian ornithologist and conservationist, lung failure.
- Shirley Herz, 87, American Tony Award-winning publicist (2009), complications from a stroke.
- David Howard, 76, English ballet teacher.
- Matthew Kaufman, 70, British biologist.
- Claire Mackay, 82, Canadian writer, cancer.
- Paul McCarron, 79, American businessman and politician, member of the Minnesota House of Representatives.
- Francis O'Reilly, 91, Irish businessman, banker and academic; Chancellor of the University of Dublin (1985–1998).
- Denis Perera, 82, Sri Lankan army general and diplomat.
- Henry Polic II, 68, American actor (When Things Were Rotten, Webster, Batman: The Animated Series), cancer.
- Lamberto Puggelli, 75, Italian stage and opera director.
- Gianni Rocca, 84, Italian Olympic sprinter (1948).
- George Tall Chief, 96, American Sioux tribal leader, Chief of Osage Nation (1982–1990), National Native American Hall of Fame inductee.
- Judit Temes, 82, Hungarian Olympic champion swimmer (1952).
- Maung Wuntha, 68, Burmese writer and activist, cancer.

=== 12 ===
- Tereza de Arriaga, 98, Portuguese painter.
- Lilian Bennett, 90, British businesswoman.
- Hans-Ekkehard Bob, 96, German military pilot, World War II flying ace.
- Prince Friso of Orange-Nassau, 44, Dutch royal, complications following 2012 skiing accident.
- F. Joseph Gossman, 83, American Roman Catholic prelate, Bishop of Raleigh (1975–2006).
- Jeffrey Gros, 75, American ecumenist and theologian.
- I. B. Holley Jr., 94, American military historian.
- Pauline Maier, 75, American historian and academic, lung cancer.
- David McLetchie, 61, Scottish politician, MSP for Lothian (1999–2003, since 2011) and Edinburgh Pentlands (2003–2011), cancer.
- Vasily Peskov, 83, Russian writer and journalist.
- Paul O'Neill, 84, Canadian actor, writer, historian and broadcaster (CBC).
- Ramon Pereira P., 94, Panamanian radio broadcaster.
- Robert Trotter, 83, Scottish actor (Take the High Road), director and photographer.
- Henny ter Weer, 91, Dutch Olympic fencer (1948).

=== 13 ===
- Anatoly Albul, 77, Russian Olympic bronze medalist wrestler (1960).
- Kris Biantoro, 75, Indonesian actor and singer, kidney disease.
- Lothar Bisky, 71, German politician, MEP (since 2009), MP for PDS (2005–2009), Landtag of Brandenburg (1990–2005).
- Bert de Jong, 56, Dutch rally driver, cancer.
- Jim Evans, 83, Australian rugby league footballer.
- Gonzalo Fernández de Córdoba, 9th Duke of Arión, 79, Spanish sailor.
- Tompall Glaser, 79, American country music singer.
- Damon Intrabartolo, 39, American playwright (Bare: A Pop Opera) and orchestrator (Superman Returns, In Good Company).
- Bertice Jacelon, 98, Trinidadian cricket umpire.
- Laurence Kaapama, 29, Namibian footballer (Eleven Arrows, national team). (body discovered on this date)
- Alfonso Lara, 67, Chilean footballer (Colo-Colo), cancer.
- Gonzalo Fernández de Córdoba Larios, 79, Spanish Olympic sailor.
- Janusz Lewandowski, 82, Polish diplomat, cancer.
- Rui Moreira Lima, 94, Brazilian military fighter pilot.
- Jun Sadogawa, 34, Japanese manga author (Muteki Kanban Musume), suicide by hanging.
- Aaron Selber Jr., 85, American retail executive and philanthropist, heart failure.
- Alyce Spotted Bear, 67, American Three Affiliated Tribes academic, politician and civil servant, National Advisory Council on Indian Education (since 2010), liver cancer.
- Earl Stevick, 89, American linguist.
- Sir Michael Stoker, 95, British physician.
- Bruno Tognaccini, 80, Italian cyclist.
- Sonatane Tuʻa Taumoepeau-Tupou, 70, Tongan politician and diplomat, Foreign Minister (2004–2009).
- Jean Vincent, 82, French football player (Lille OSC, Stade de Reims) and coach (FC Nantes, Cameroon, Tunisia).

=== 14 ===
- Gia Allemand, 29, American model and reality television star (The Bachelor), suicide by hanging.
- Stephen Easley, 60, American politician, member of the New Mexico House of Representatives (2013), complications from an infection.
- Vin Evans, 78, English cricketer (Durham).
- Kevin Feeney, 61, Irish judge, member of the High Court (since 2006), suspected heart attack.
- René Fernández Apaza, 89, Bolivian Roman Catholic prelate, Archbishop of Sucre (1983–1988) and Cochabamba (1988–1999).
- John Forfar, 96, British paediatrician and academic.
- Jack Garfinkel, 95, American basketball player (Boston Celtics).
- Jack Germond, 85, American journalist (Washington Star, The Baltimore Sun) and novelist, pulmonary disease.
- Dilip Singh Judeo, 64, Indian politician, MP for Bilaspur (1989–1998), Chhattisgarh MLA for Kharasia (1988–1989), kidney and lung infections.
- Sándor Keresztes, 94, Hungarian diplomat and jurist, president of the Christian Democratic People's Party (1989–1990), MP (1947–1948, 1990, 1994–1998).
- Lisa Robin Kelly, 43, American actress (That '70s Show, Days of Our Lives, Amityville Dollhouse), multiple drug intoxication.
- Allen Lanier, 67, American rock keyboardist and guitarist (Blue Öyster Cult), complications from COPD.
- Min Lu, 60, Burmese humorist, poet and writer, lung cancer.
- Amer Abdel Maksoud, Egyptian professional footballer, murdered.
- Luciano Martino, 79, Italian film producer, director and screenwriter, pulmonary edema.
- Iqbal Mirchi, 63, Indian underworld figure, heart attack.
- Paddy Power, 84, Irish politician, MEP (1977–1979), TD for Kildare (1969–1989).
- Mack Rankin, 83, American oilman and Texas Rangers part-owner.
- Mark Sutton, 42, British stuntman, parachutist at 2012 Summer Olympics opening ceremony, stunt wing-diving accident.

=== 15 ===
- Abdul Rahman Al-Sumait, 65, Kuwaiti Islamic scholar and medical practitioner, complications of a heart condition.
- S. M. Laljan Basha, 56, Indian politician, MP for Guntur (1991–1996) and Andhra Pradesh (2002–2008), traffic collision.
- Jane Harvey, 88, American jazz singer, stomach cancer.
- Peter Huttenlocher, 82, German-born American neuroscientist, pneumonia.
- Miroslav Komárek, 89, Czech historical linguist.
- Beatrice Kozera, 92, American book character (On the Road), natural causes.
- Bert Lance, 82, American civil servant and presidential advisor, Director of the Office of Management and Budget (1977).
- William S. Livingston, 93, American academic, President of the University of Texas at Austin (1992–1993).
- Rosalía Mera, 69, Spanish textile executive (Inditex, Zara), complications from a stroke.
- Sławomir Mrożek, 83, Polish playwright.
- Selliah Ponnadurai, 78, Sri Lankan cricket umpire.
- August Schellenberg, 77, Canadian-born American actor (Free Willy, Eight Below, The New World), lung cancer.
- Marich Man Singh Shrestha, 71, Nepali politician, Prime Minister (1986–1990), lung cancer.
- Robert R. Taylor, 73, Canadian wildlife photographer, cancer.
- Jacques Vergès, 88, Thai-born French lawyer, heart attack.
- Pat Wiggins, 73, American politician, member of the California State Assembly (1998–2004) and Senate (2006–2010).

=== 16 ===
- Ilkka Auer, 83, Finnish Olympic athlete.
- Desh Azad, 75, Indian cricketer.
- Roy Bonisteel, 83, Canadian journalist and television host, cancer.
- Chris Hallam, 49, Welsh Paralympian swimmer and wheelchair racer, cancer.
- Kalyan Mitter, 76, Indian cricketer and coach.
- John Munro, 84, Australian cricketer and football player.
- Carlos Prada Sanmiguel, 73, Colombian Roman Catholic prelate, Bishop of Duitama–Sogamoso (1994–2012).
- David Rees, 95, British mathematician.
- John Ryden, 82, Scottish footballer (Tottenham Hotspur).
- Francesco Scaratti, 74, Italian footballer (A.S. Roma).
- Ray B. Sitton, 89, American lieutenant general, Director of the Joint Staff (1976–1977).

=== 17 ===
- Mayavaram Saraswathi Ammal, 91, Indian classical flautist.
- Stephen Antonakos, 86, Greek-born American painter and sculptor.
- Bo Bing, 91, Chinese English grammar academic, respiratory failure.
- Chow Yam-nam, 76, Thai mystic, respiratory disease.
- Jim Clark, 88, Australian VFL footballer (Carlton Football Club).
- John Connelly, 85, American college baseball head coach (Northeastern University).
- Rod Craig, 55, American baseball player (Seattle Mariners), stabbed.
- Thomas Crowley, 77, American politician, member of the Vermont Senate (1967–1991), complications from hip surgery.
- Odilia Dank, 74, American politician, member of the Oklahoma House of Representatives (1994–2006), cancer.
- Jan Ekström, 89, Swedish author and adman.
- Devin Gray, 41, American basketball player (Sacramento Kings, San Antonio Spurs, Houston Rockets), heart attack.
- Jack Harshman, 86, American baseball player (Chicago White Sox).
- Joseph Hoàng Văn Tiệm, 74, Vietnamese Roman Catholic prelate, Bishop of Bui Chu (since 2001).
- John Hollander, 83, American poet, pulmonary congestion.
- Claus Jacobi, 86, German journalist, editor-in-chief of Der Spiegel (1962–1968).
- David Landes, 89, American academic.
- Kjell Lund, 86, Norwegian architect, songwriter and singer.
- Frank Martínez, 89, American artist, complications from diabetes and renal disease.
- Benjamin Mwila, 70, Zambian politician, Minister of Defence (1991–1997), MP for Luanshya, complications of malaria.
- Thomas Nguyễn Văn Tân, 72, Vietnamese Roman Catholic prelate, Bishop of Vĩnh Long (since 2001).
- Noel Pidding, 86, Australian rugby league player (St George Dragons).
- Wallace H. Robinson, 93, American Marine Corps general.
- Fernando Urdapilleta, 89, Argentine Olympic equestrian.
- Gus Winckel, 100, Dutch military pilot.

=== 18 ===
- Christopher Barton, 85, British Olympic rower (1948).
- Bill Bond, 71, American tennis player.
- Florin Cioabă, 58, Romanian Romani Pentecostal minister, cardiac arrest.
- Bob Curtis, 78, American football coach.
- Wes Dakus, 75, Canadian rockabilly musician.
- Josephine D'Angelo, 88, American baseball player (South Bend Blue Sox).
- Keith Dollery, 88, Australian cricketer.
- Victoria Eugenia Fernández de Córdoba, 96, Spanish noble, Duchess of Medinaceli (since 1956).
- Dezső Gyarmati, 85, Hungarian Olympic water polo champion (1952, 1956, 1964), silver medalist (1948), bronze medalist (1960) and coach.
- Jean Kahn, 84, French Jewish community leader and human rights activist.
- Alberto Marsicano, 61, Brazilian musician, translator, writer, philosopher and professor.
- Edith Master, 80, American Olympic equestrian (1976).
- Eyob Mekonnen, 37, Ethiopian reggae singer, complications from a stroke.
- Tjostolv Moland, 32, Norwegian Army officer and private security contractor, suicide by hanging.
- José Luis Montes, 57, Spanish football player and coach.
- Albert Murray, 97, American literary and jazz critic, biographer and novelist.
- Elaine Sortino, 64, American softball coach (University of Massachusetts), cancer.
- Rolv Wesenlund, 76, Norwegian actor and comedian.

=== 19 ===
- Musa'id bin Abdulaziz Al Saud, 89–90, Saudi Arabian prince, second-oldest surviving son of King Abdulaziz.
- Abdur Rahman Boyati, 74, Bangladeshi folk singer.
- Pat Delaney, 69, Irish hurler (Kilkenny GAA).
- Russell Doughten, 86, American film producer (A Thief in the Night), renal failure.
- Reha Eken, 88, Turkish footballer.
- Abdelrahman El-Trabely, 23, Egyptian Olympic wrestler (2012), shot.
- Abdul Rahim Hatif, 88, Afghan politician, President (1992).
- Donna Hightower, 86, American singer.
- Hoàng Cầm, 93, Vietnamese military officer, Senior Lieutenant General (1984–1992), recipient of the Medal of Ho Chi Minh.
- Mike Tichafa Karakadzai, 56, Zimbabwean military officer and politician, car accident.
- Mirko Kovač, 74, Montenegrin writer.
- Wacław Kuźmicki, 92, Polish Olympic decathlete (1948).
- William McDermott, 83, Irish-born Peruvian Roman Catholic prelate, Bishop of Huancavélica (1982–2005).
- R. S. McGregor, 83–84, New Zealand philologist.
- Stephenie McMillan, 71, British set decorator (The English Patient, Chocolat, Harry Potter), Oscar winner (1997), ovarian cancer.
- Matti Murto, 64, Finnish Olympic ice hockey player (1972, 1976), esophageal cancer.
- Sid Parnes, 91, American academic.
- Fritz Rau, 83, German music promoter.
- José Sarria, 90, American LGBT rights activist and drag queen, founder of the Imperial Court System.
- Kenneth N. Stevens, 89, American computer scientist.
- Olev Subbi, 83, Estonian artist.
- Dagon Taya, 95, Burmese author and peace activist.
- Cedar Walton, 79, American jazz pianist.
- Lee Thompson Young, 29, American actor (The Famous Jett Jackson, Friday Night Lights, Rizzoli & Isles), suicide by gunshot.

=== 20 ===
- Sathima Bea Benjamin, 76, South African jazz singer, wife of Abdullah Ibrahim.
- Alan Bluechel, 88, American politician.
- Jim Brothers, 72, American sculptor, cancer.
- Narendra Dabholkar, 67, Indian social activist, shot.
- Don Hassler, 84, American jazz musician and businessman.
- Wayne Hodgson, 54, New Zealand cricketer.
- Mahmoud Hweimel, Jordanian politician, Member of the House of Representatives, cancer.
- Leslie Jaeger, 87, British–born Canadian civil engineer and academic.
- Bishun Khare, 80, Indian scientist (SETI Institute).
- Lando, 23, German Thoroughbred racehorse and sire, euthanized.
- Ernest-Marie Laperrousaz, 89, French historian and archaeologist.
- Elmore Leonard, 87, American author (Get Shorty, Three-Ten to Yuma, Out of Sight), complications from a stroke.
- Jimmy Mankins, 87, American politician, member of the Texas House of Representatives (1975–1983).
- Fred Martin, 84, Scottish footballer (Aberdeen).
- Marian McPartland, 95, British jazz pianist, writer, composer, and radio host (Piano Jazz).
- John W. Morris, 91, American army lieutenant general, Chief of Engineers (1976—1980).
- Mun Kyong-jin, North Korean head of the Unhasu Orchestra, executed by firing squad.
- Ewa Petelska, 92, Polish film director (Copernicus) and screenwriter.
- Charles Pollock, 83, American furniture designer, fire.
- Ted Post, 95, American film director (Hang 'Em High, Magnum Force, Beneath the Planet of the Apes).
- Jayant Salgaonkar, 84, Indian historian, academic and astrologer, founder of Kalnirnay almanac.
- Costică Ștefănescu, 62, Romanian footballer (UEFA Euro 1984), suicide by self-defenestration.

=== 21 ===
- Abdul Razzaq Baloch, 35–42, Pakistani journalist, strangulation (body found on this date).
- Jean Berkey, 74, American politician, member of the Washington House of Representatives (2000–2004) and Senate (2004–2010).
- Sid Bernstein, 95, American music producer and promoter, brought The Beatles and The Rolling Stones to the United States.
- Wellington Burtnett, 82, American Olympic silver medallist ice hockey player (1956).
- Rodolfo Tan Cardoso, 75, Filipino chess player, heart attack.
- Malathi Chendur, 84, Indian Telugu writer, novelist and columnist.
- C. Gordon Fullerton, 76, American astronaut and test pilot (ALT program, STS-3, STS-51-F), complications from a stroke.
- David Gilhooly, 70, American ceramicist and printmaker, cancer.
- Kemaluddin Hossain, 90, Bangladeshi jurist.
- Huw Jenkins, 68, Welsh cricket player (Glamorgan).
- Elwyn John, 77, Welsh priest.
- Matti Kasvio, 69, Finnish Olympic swimmer.
- Ulvis Katlaps, 45, Latvian ice hockey player, stomach cancer.
- Enos Nkala, 81, Zimbabwean politician, Minister of Finance (1980–1983), Minister of Defense (1985–1988), multiple organ failure.
- Lew Wood, 84, American television journalist (The Today Show, CBS News), kidney failure.

=== 22 ===
- Robert M. Bowman, 78, American air force officer.
- Keiko Fuji, 62, Japanese singer and actress, fall.
- Jørgen Hammergaard Hansen, 83, Danish badminton player.
- Sir Geoffrey Inkin, 78, British soldier and public servant.
- Petr Kment, 71, Czech Olympic bronze-medalist Greco-Roman wrestler (1968).
- William McIlroy, 85, British secularist and atheist activist.
- Ronald Motley, 68, American lawyer, led efforts against tobacco companies, complications of organ failure.
- Jetty Paerl, 92, Dutch singer ("De vogels van Holland").
- Paul Poberezny, 91, American aviation pioneer, aircraft designer and founder of the Experimental Aircraft Association, cancer.
- Jim Ramsay, 83, Australian politician, Member of the Victorian Legislative Assembly for Balwyn (1973–1988).
- Andrea Servi, 29, Italian footballer, lung cancer.
- Peter Waieng, 47, Papua New Guinean politician, Minister of Defence, stabbed.

=== 23 ===
- Alan Brown, 80, English cricketer (Northumberland).
- Red Burns, 88, Canadian academic.
- Richard J. Corman, 58, American railroad executive, owner and founder of R.J. Corman Railroad Group, multiple myeloma.
- Stephen Crohn, 66, American medical research subject (HIV), suicide by drug overdose.
- David Garrick, 67, English singer.
- William Glasser, 88, American psychiatrist and developer of reality therapy, respiratory failure from pneumonia.
- Tonnie Hom, 80, Dutch swimmer.
- Charles Lisanby, 89, American production designer, complications from a fall.
- Henry Maxwell, 81, New Zealand rugby league player (Point Chevalier Pirates).
- Dean Meminger, 65, American basketball player (New York Knicks, Atlanta Hawks).
- Konstanty Miodowicz, 62, Polish politician, member of the Sejm (since 1997), complications from neurosurgery.
- Peter Needham, 81, South African cricketer.
- Vesna Rožič, 26, Slovene chess player, peritoneal cancer.
- Irwin Russell, 87, American entertainment lawyer (Michael Eisner, Jim Henson, Dr. Seuss), complications from leukemia.
- Nasser Sharify, 87, Iranian academic and librarian.
- Gilbert Taylor, 99, British cinematographer (Star Wars, The Omen, Dr. Strangelove).
- Javanshir Vakilov, 62, Azerbaijani diplomat and academic.
- David Watkins, 87, British politician, MP for Consett (1966–1983).
- Vadim Yusov, 84, Russian cinematographer (Ivan's Childhood, Andrei Rublev, Solaris).
- Tatyana Zaslavskaya, 85, Russian economic sociologist.

=== 24 ===
- Gerry Baker, 75, Scottish-American soccer player (Ipswich Town, Manchester City).
- Alimenta Bishop, 97, Grenadian activist.
- Sonia Coutinho, 74, Brazilian journalist, short story writer and novelist, heart attack.
- Ricardo Elizondo Elizondo, 63, Mexican writer, cancer.
- Julie Harris, 87, American actress (The Belle of Amherst, East of Eden, Knots Landing), five-time Tony winner, heart failure.
- Alf Kaartvedt, 92, Norwegian historian.
- Julio Marigil, 77, Spanish footballer.
- Muriel Siebert, 84, American financial executive and philanthropist; first woman member of the New York Stock Exchange, cancer.
- Nílton de Sordi, 82, Brazilian World Cup champion footballer (1958), multiple organ dysfunction syndrome.
- Filippo Strofaldi, 73, Italian Roman Catholic prelate, Bishop of Ischia (1997–2012).
- P. W. Vidanagamage, 79, Sri Lankan cricket umpire.
- Mike Winters, 82, British comedian.
- José Zárate, 63, Colombian footballer.

=== 25 ===
- Ciril Bergles, 79, Slovene poet, essayist and translator.
- António Borges, 63, Portuguese economist and banker, pancreatic cancer.
- Robert J. Corts, 96, American politician and judge.
- Domenico Crusco, 79, Italian Roman Catholic prelate, Bishop of Oppido Mamertina-Palmi (1991–1999) and San Marco Argentano-Scalea (1999–2011).
- William Froug, 91, American television writer and producer (Bewitched, The Twilight Zone, Gilligan's Island).
- Akio Hattori, 84, Japanese mathematician.
- Bobby Hoff, 73, American poker player.
- Frederick Wilfrid Lancaster, 80, British-born American information scientist.
- Liu Fuzhi, 96, Chinese politician, Procurator-General of the Supreme People's Procuratorate (1988–1993).
- Bill Nilsson, 80, Swedish motocross racer.
- Rajko Pavlovec, 81, Slovenian geologist.
- Raghunath Panigrahi, 79, Indian classical singer and music director.
- Abdul Samad Abdulla, 67, Maldivian politician, Foreign Minister (since 2012), kidney failure.
- Gylmar dos Santos Neves, 83, Brazilian World Cup champion footballer (1958, 1962), stroke.
- Karl-Wilhelm Welwei, 82, German historian.

=== 26 ===
- John Dawe, 85, Australian Olympic sailor.
- Hélie de Saint Marc, 91, French Resistance member and military officer, participant in 1961 Generals' Putsch.
- John J. Gilligan, 92, American politician, member of the United States House of Representatives for Ohio (1965–1967), Governor of Ohio (1971–1975), heart failure.
- Kauko Hänninen, 83, Finnish Olympic bronze medallist rower (1956, 1960, 1964, 1968).
- Henny Knoet, 71, Dutch designer (Efteling), cancer.
- Luigi Lucchini, 94, Italian steel executive, President of Confindustria (1984–1988).
- Bobby Malzahn, 82, American racing driver.
- Gerard Murphy, 64, British actor (Batman Begins, Doctor Who, Waterworld), prostate cancer.
- Bill Schmitz, 59, American football coach, United States Coast Guard Academy (1993–1996), Austin Peay State University (1997–2002), suicide by jumping.
- Jack Sinagra, 63, American politician, member of the New Jersey Senate (1992–2002), Mayor of East Brunswick, New Jersey (1989–1991).
- Sybille Verckist, 78, Belgian Olympic swimmer.
- Clyde A. Wheeler, 92, American politician and lobbyist.
- George Whittaker, 93, Canadian politician.

=== 27 ===
- David Barker, 75, English physician and epidemiologist.
- Zelmo Beaty, 73, American basketball player (St. Louis Hawks, Utah Stars).
- Helene Brandt, 77, American sculptor.
- Chen Liting, 103, Chinese playwright and film director.
- Kent Finell, 69, Swedish radio host (Svensktoppen).
- Max Fuller, 68, Australian chess master.
- Carl Graffunder, 94, American modernist architect.
- Magnhild Holmberg, 70, Norwegian politician.
- Jean Jansem, 93, Turkish-born French painter of Armenian themes.
- Chris Kennedy, 64, Australian film director (Doing Time for Patsy Cline, A Man's Gotta Do), heart attack.
- Zoltán Kovács, 26, Hungarian footballer.
- Anatoly Onoprienko, 54, Ukrainian serial killer and mass murderer, heart failure.
- Bill Peach, 78, Australian journalist and television presenter, cancer.
- Henry Rebello, 84, Indian Olympic triple jumper (1948) and sport administrator.
- Héctor Sanabria, 27, Argentinian footballer (Deportivo Laferrere), heart attack.
- Lucy Smith, 78, Norwegian academic, Rector of the University of Oslo (1993–1998), cancer.
- David Stenhouse, 81, English biologist.
- Dave Thomas, 79, Welsh international golfer and golf course designer.

=== 28 ===
- Bernard Becker, 93, American ophthalmologist and glaucoma researcher (Washington University School of Medicine), lung cancer.
- Lorella Cedroni, 52, Italian political philosopher.
- John Bellany, 71, Scottish painter.
- Matt Doust, 29, American-born Australian artist, epileptic seizure.
- Edmund Fitzgerald, 87, American businessman.
- Murray Gershenz, 91, American actor (The Hangover, I Love You, Man, The Incredible Burt Wonderstone) and entrepreneur, heart attack.
- Ray Grebey, 85, American labor negotiator for Major League Baseball.
- Gus, 27, American polar bear, euthanized. (death announced on this date)
- László Gyetvai, 94, Hungarian footballer (Ferencváros, national team).
- Ajay Jha, 57, Indian first-class cricketer, heart attack.
- Francis Kajiya, 59, Zambian footballer.
- Diarmuid Ó Gráinne, 63, Irish writer and journalist.
- Michael Ollis, 24, American soldier, United States Army Medal of Honor recipient.
- Larry Pennell, 85, American actor (Ripcord, The Great White Hope, Bubba Ho-Tep).
- Frank Pulli, 78, American baseball umpire, complications from Parkinson's disease.
- Brian Smith, 57, English footballer (Bolton Wanderers).
- Barry Stobart, 75, English footballer (Wolverhampton Wanderers).
- Aajonus Vonderplanitz, 66, American food activist, fall.
- Rafael Díaz Ycaza, 87, Ecuadorian writer.

=== 29 ===
- Jack Beal, 82, American realist painter.
- Artan Bushati, 49, Albanian football manager.
- Bob Green, 87, Australian naturalist, photographer and conservationist.
- Peter Grzybowski, 59, Polish artist.
- Joan L. Krajewski, 79, American politician, Member of the Philadelphia City Council (1980–2012), complications from COPD.
- Robert MacEwen, 85, Scottish rugby player.
- Darren Manzella, 36, American gay rights activist, traffic collision.
- Cliff Mason, 83, English professional footballer.
- Medardo Joseph Mazombwe, 81, Zambian Roman Catholic prelate, Bishop of Chipata (1970–1996) and Cardinal Archbishop of Lusaka (1996–2006), cancer.
- Cliff Morgan, 83, Welsh rugby player and broadcaster.
- Bruce C. Murray, 81, American space scientist, Director of the Jet Propulsion Laboratory (1976–1982), complications from Alzheimer's disease.
- Fernando Solijon, 47, Filipino radio journalist, shot.
- Steven Tari, 41–42, Papua New Guinean cult leader, slashed.
- Are Vesterlid, 92, Norwegian architect.

=== 30 ===
- Alfredo Betancourt, 98, Salvadoran writer.
- William C. Campbell, 90, American golfer, U.S. Amateur champion (1964), President of the United States Golf Association (1982–1983).
- Howie Crittenden, 80, American basketball player (Murray State University).
- Eva J. Engel, 94, German-Jewish scholar.
- Allan Gotthelf, 70, American philosopher, cancer.
- Seamus Heaney, 74, Irish poet, Nobel Prize laureate (1995).
- Geresom Ilukor, 77–78, Ugandan bishop.
- Romana Kryzanowska, 90, American Pilates instructor and author.
- Leo Lewis, 80, American football player (Lincoln Blue Tigers, Winnipeg Blue Bombers).
- John "Juke" Logan, 66, American blues harmonica player, complications from esophageal cancer.
- Lotfi Mansouri, 84, Iranian opera director (Canadian Opera Company, San Francisco Opera).
- Glenn Terrell, 93, American academic, President of Washington State University (1967–1985).
- Tokai Teio, 25, Japanese thoroughbred racehorse, heart attack.

=== 31 ===
- Jean-Louis Beaumont, 87, French politician, Deputy (1978–1981, 1993–1997), mayor of Saint-Maur-des-Fossés (1977–2008).
- William John Brennan, 75, Australian Roman Catholic prelate, Bishop of Wagga Wagga (1984–2002).
- Peter Calder, 87, British mechanical engineer.
- Alan Carrington, 79, British chemist.
- Sir David Frost, 74, British broadcaster (That Was the Week That Was, The Frost Report, The Nixon Interviews), heart attack.
- Jimmy Greenhalgh, 90, British football player and manager (Darlington F.C.).
- Robert Lebron, 85, American impressionist artist.
- LeRoy Martin, 84, American police officer, Chicago Police Department superintendent (1987–1992).
- Niani Natung, Indian politician, member of the Arunachal Pradesh Legislative Assembly (2001–2004).
- Samuel Rovinski, 81–82, Costa Rican author of plays, novels, short stories and essays.
- Donald W. Steinmetz, 88, American judge.
- Jan Camiel Willems, 73, Belgian mathematician.
