= List of number-one songs of 2026 (Panama) =

This is a list of the number-one songs of 2026 in Panama. The charts are published by Monitor Latino, based on airplay across radio stations in Panama using the Radio Tracking Data, LLC in real time, with its chart week running from Monday to Sunday.

== Chart history ==
Issue date	Song	Artist	Reference
5 January	"Lokita Por Mí"	Romeo Santos and Prince Royce	
12 January	"Lokita Por Mí"	Romeo Santos and Prince Royce	
19 January	"Cambiaré"	Luis Fonsi and Feid	
26 January	"Cambiaré"	Luis Fonsi and Feid	
2 February	"Cambiaré"	Luis Fonsi and Feid	
9 February	"Cambiaré"	Luis Fonsi and Feid	
16 February	"Cambiaré"	Luis Fonsi and Feid	
23 February	"Cambiaré"	Luis Fonsi and Feid	
2 March	"Ojalá"	Lunay	
9 March	"Chévere (Premium Remix)"	Aria Vega and Ryan Castro	
16 March	"Chévere (Premium Remix)"	Aria Vega and Ryan Castro	
23 March	"Chévere (Premium Remix)"	Aria Vega and Ryan Castro	
30 March	"Chévere (Premium Remix)"	Aria Vega and Ryan Castro	
6 April	"Chévere (Premium Remix)"	Aria Vega and Ryan Castro	
13 April	"Tu Cárcel"	Morat	
20 April	"Tu Cárcel"	Morat	
27 April	"Te Dedico"	Carlos Vives	
4 May	"Te Dedico"	Carlos Vives	
11 May	"Te Dedico"	Carlos Vives	
18 May	"La Villa"	Ryan Castro, Kapo and Gangsta	
25 May	"La Villa"	Ryan Castro, Kapo and Gangsta	
1 June	"Te Dedico"	Carlos Vives	
8 June	"La Villa"	Ryan Castro, Kapo and Gangsta	
15 June	"Dai Dai"	Shakira and Burna Boy	
22 June	"Dai Dai"	Shakira and Burna Boy	
29 June	"Dai Dai"	Shakira and Burna Boy	
6 July	"Dai Dai"	Shakira and Burna Boy	
13 July	"Dai Dai"	Shakira and Burna Boy	
20 July	"Lo Poco que Yo Quiero"	Morat and Silvestre Dangond	
27 July	"Lo Poco que Yo Quiero"	Morat and Silvestre Dangond	
3 August	"Lo Poco que Yo Quiero"	Morat and Silvestre Dangond	
