= Senator Crowley =

Senator Crowley may refer to:

- Elizabeth Crowley (Rhode Island politician) (born 1951), Rhode Island State Senate
- Jeremiah Crowley (politician) (1832–1901), Massachusetts State Senate
- Miles Crowley (1859–1921), Texas State Senate
- Richard Crowley (1836–1908), New York State Senate
- Rosemary Crowley (1938-2025), senator for South Australia from 1983 to 2002
- Thomas Crowley (American politician) (1935–2013), Vermont State Senate
