= Peter Needham =

Peter Needham may refer to:

- Peter Needham (cricketer) (1932-2013)
- Peter Needham (scholar) (1680-1731)
