= Rastetter =

Rastetter is a surname of German origin. Notable people with the surname include:

- Bruce Rastetter, American agribusiness executive
- Tanja Rastetter (born 1971), German footballer
- William Rastetter (born 1948), American biopharmaceutical business executive
