= Huw Jenkins (disambiguation) =

Huw Jenkins is an English businessman who is managing partner at BTG Pactual investment bank.

Huw Jenkins may also refer to:

- Huw Jenkins (Welsh businessman) (born 1963), owner of Newport County A.F.C.
- Huw Jenkins (cricketer) (1944–2013), Welsh cricketer

== See also ==
- Jenkins (surname)
