= Wai Phyo Han =

Burmese politician

Member of the Yangon Region Hluttaw
- Incumbent
- Assumed office 8 February 2016
- Constituency: Insein Township № 2

Personal details
- Born: 27 December 1984 (age 41) Yangon, Myanmar
- Party: National League for Democracy
- Education: Yangon Technological University; University of Distance Education, Yangon

Wai Phyo Han (Burmese: ဝေဖြိုးဟန်; born 27 December 1984) is a Burmese politician, writer and former engineer who has been the MP of the Yangon Region Hluttaw for Insein No. 2 constituency since the 2015 general election. He is also undertaking as a secretary of a parliamentary committee which concern transportation, communication, construction and industry affairs.

== Early life and career ==
Wai Phyo Han was born on 27 December 1984 in Yangon to parents San Maung and Nan Nan Win. He graduated as a Bachelor of Mechanical Engineering from Yangon Technological University and received a Post Graduate Diploma in Law from University of Distance Education, Yangon. Before work in political field, he worked in engineering in Myanmar and Singapore. He is the director of the Best Brothers United Company.

== As a writer ==
Wai Phyo Han has been writing articles under his pen name Wai Phyo Han (Insein) and more than 250 articles have been written in State-owned newspapers such as New Light of Myanmar and The Mirror, The Standard Times Daily, The Politics Journal, Public Image Journal, Hanthawaddy Times Journal, Bago Voice Journal and Youth Magazine etc.,.

The first printed article of his life was "A Letter of how I Feel" (ခံစားမိသလိုရေးတဲ့စာ). The author was mentioned in the People's Journal, led by the famous author Maung Wuntha and Pe Myint. His book Letters to the Grandfather (ဘကြီးဖြိုးထံပေးစာ) was released in 2017.

In February 2020, he published his second book named "Experience about MP", which was a collection of his articles.

== Political career ==
Wai Phyo Han joined the National League for Democracy in 2012 before the by-election. Since he became an NLD member, he involved many political activities in the township and supporting to the Insein public.

In the 2015 Myanmar general election, he contested the Yangon Region Hluttaw from Insein Township No.2 parliamentary constituency and won a seat. He is most known because of the Yangon Bus Service (YBS) proposal, which was submitted on 5 April 2017. His comments were critical of Yangon Region Chief Minister Phyo Min Thein's YBS system. Twenty-seven parliamentarians enthusiastically discussed his proposal.

In 2017, Wai Phyo Han and three other Insein MPs tried to get land and budget for Insein Township Hall. Due Wai Phyo Han and other three Insein MP's continuous effort at Hluttaw, they got land for townhall in 2018 and then, they tried to get a budget to construct the townhall in the 2018-2019 budget. The construction of townhall started in March 2019 and finished in September 2019 and officially opened on 21 November 2019.

He is a leading member of Insein Township's COVID-19 Protection, Controlling and Treating Working Committee. He tried to get suitable building for Quarantine patients and donation from donors (in kind and in cash). He used to relay news to Insein township public about COVID-19. Wai Phyo Han also was meeting and encouraging quarantine patients, and gave them moral support.

== Work ==
- Letters to the Grandfather (ဘကြီးဖြိုးထံပေးစာ) (2017)
- Experience about MP (2020)
