= Marsicano =

Marsicano is a surname. Notable people with the surname include:

- Alberto Marsicano (1952–2013), Brazilian musician, translator, writer, philosopher and professor
- Merle Marsicano (1903–1983), American dancer and choreographer
- Michael Marsicano (born 1956), American entrepreneur, President and CEO of Foundation For The Carolinas
- Nicholas Marsicano (1908–1991), American painter and university teacher
- Trevor Marsicano (born 1989), American speed skater and Olympian
- Claudia Marsicano (born 1992), Italian actress
