= McAnea =

McAnea is a surname. Notable people with the surname include:

- Christina McAnea (born 1958), British trade union leader
- Thomas McAnea (c.1950–2013), Scottish counterfeiter
