= Marigil =

Marigil is a surname. Notable people with the surname include:

- Julio Marigil (1936–2013), Spanish footballer and manager
- René Marigil (1928–2009), Spanish cyclist
