= Bobing =

Bobing or Bo Bing may refer to:

- Böbing, a municipality in Bavaria, Germany
- Bo Bing (academic) (1921–2013), Chinese professor of English
- Bo Bing (game), a Chinese dice game
- Popiah (薄餅; bóbĭng), a Fujianese/Teochew-style spring roll
- Thin Ice (2023 TV series) (薄冰; Bóbīng), Chinese TV series
