= Mary Lindenstein Walshok =

American sociologist

Dr. Mary Lindenstein Walshok RNO1kl (born 1942) is an American educational sociologist.

== Education ==
- B.A. in 1964 Pomona College
- M.A. in 1967, Indiana University
- Ph.D. in 1969, Indiana University

== Career ==
She has been on the faculty of the University of California, San Diego (UCSD) since 1972. The focus of her career has been understanding and fostering the growth of local and regional economies throughout the world. She is the Associate Vice Chancellor of Public Programs at UCSD. Until 2021 she also served as the Dean of Extended Studies and as an adjunct professor in the Department of Sociology. The Department of Extended Studies, also called UCSD Extension, provides education and training to adults who are not enrolled as SDSU students, reaching about 80,000 adults each year. As of 2021 she is overseeing the development of UCSD's new center in downtown San Diego.

Walshok was a co-founder of the San Diego nonprofit CONNECT, which encourages entrepreneurs and startups, and is credited with emphasizing its bottom-up organizational structure. Much of her work focuses on the development of regional innovation clusters, drawing from her experience and connections within San Diego, particularly "how globalization and rapid changes in technology are affecting the social dynamics and economic challenges of regions across America."

== Publications ==
She has written chapters in several books and articles on education and the world of work. She has also written two books, Blue Collar Women, published by Anchor/Doubleday and Knowledge Without Boundaries: What America's Research Universities Can Do for the Economy, the Workplace, and the Community, published by Jossey-Bass in 1995.

In 2010, she co-authored Closing America's Job Gap, a business-management book about the disparity between the wealth of new jobs created by tech and the lack of trained people to fill them. It was published in 2011 by WBusiness Books, with copyright given to University of California Regents.

== Awards ==
In May 2002, she was decorated with the rank of Knighthood, First Class, of the Order of the Polar Star by King Carl XVI Gustaf of Sweden, "in recognition of her significant contribution to the development of entrepreneurship in Sweden". She has earlier received a Kellogg Foundation national fellowship.
