= Duane J. Roth =

- Born: November 24, 1949
- Died: August 3, 2013 (aged 63); San Diego, California, U.S.
- Education: Iowa Wesleyan College
- Occupations: Chief executive officer of Connect member of the board of CONNECT

Duane J. Roth (November 24, 1949 – August 3, 2013) was chief executive officer of CONNECT. He graduated from Iowa Wesleyan College.

== Career ==
Before working with CONNECT, Roth founded Alliance Pharmaceutical Corp, where he was chief executive officer and chairman of the board. Before a founder of Alliance Pharmaceutical, Roth held management positions at Wyeth and Johnson & Johnson.

== Advisory committees and boards ==
Roth has been as a member of the board of directors of the Biotechnology Industry Organization, BIOCOM, the California Healthcare Institute, and SAIC-Frederick, Inc. Roth was on boards of the University of California, including the President’s Board on Science and Innovation, the California Institute for Telecommunications and Information Technology, the UCSD Sulpizio Cardiovascular Center, the UCSD Foundation board of directors, the UCSD Health Sciences advisory board, and the Industry Dean’s Advisory Board of the Skaggs School of Pharmacy and Pharmaceutical Sciences. Roth is chairman of the Founders Circle of the UC San Diego Preuss Charter School. He also was on the board of SDSU College of Business as well as the advisory boards of SDSU Sciences & Engineering.

== Governmental appointments and participation ==
In 2006 Roth was appointed to the Independent Citizens Oversight Committee for the California Institute of Regenerative Medicine by Governor Arnold Schwarzenegger, and was elected vice chairman in 2009. Roth was also a member on the Governor's Commission for Jobs and Economic Growth, and was co-chair of the Affordable Housing Working Group.

== Awards ==
Roth has received awards including:

- The Economic Opportunity Award from Lead San Diego.
- The Lifetime Achievement Award from the San Diego Business Journal.
- The Distinguished Alumni Award from Iowa Wesleyan University.

== Death ==
Roth died on August 3, 2013, in UC San Diego Medical Center of complications of injuries in a bicycle accident on July 21, 2013, during a charity ride for the Challenged Athletes Foundation. The CIRM's obituary for Roth notes his efforts both on the CIRM board and for patient advocacy via the Independent Citizens Oversight Committee (ICOC).
