= Morat =

Morat may refer to:

- Morat, Switzerland, or Murten, a town in Switzerland
- Battle of Morat (1476), between the Swiss Federation and Charles I, Duke of Burgundy
- Morat (band), a Colombian folk band
- Morat, a type of mead that uses mulberries. See mead#List of mead variants.

== People with the surname ==
- Jean-Pierre Morat (1846–1920), French physiologist
- Philippe Morat (1937–2025), French botanist
- Rose Morat (1906–2013), American mugging victim
