= William Rastetter =

American scientist, entrepreneur and venture capitalist

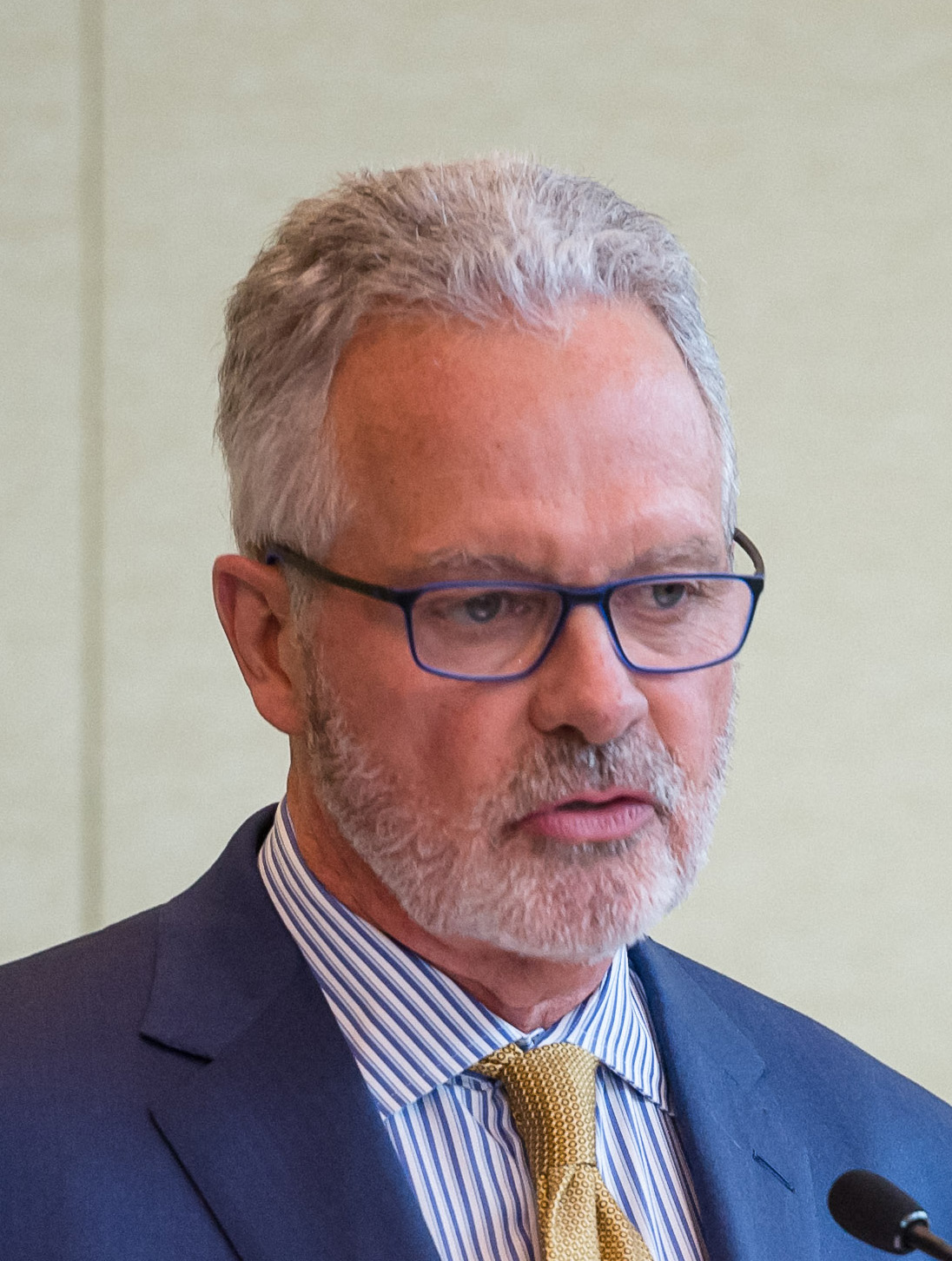
- Rastetter in 2018
- Born: William Harry Rastetter; 1948 (age 77–78); Panama
- Education: MIT, Harvard
- Awards: Biotechnology Heritage Award
- Scientific career
- Fields: Biotechnology, Venture capitalism
- Doctoral advisor: Robert Burns Woodward

William H. Rastetter (born 1948), a scientist, entrepreneur and venture capitalist, is the chair of Neurocrine Biosciences (NASDAQ), of Fate Therapeutics (NASDAQ), of Daré Bioscience, (NASDAQ), and of Iambic Therapeutics (NASDAQ), all in San Diego, California. He was a founding board member and investor in GRAIL, Inc. in Menlo Park, California, and served for a period as the company's interim CEO (2017) and chair (2017–2018). Rastetter also served as a director of Regulus Therapeutics (2013-2025) through its acquisition by Novartis. He was a partner in the venture firm Venrock (2006–2013), and a trustee at Caltech (2015–2018). He has served as a director (1998–2016) and as chair of Illumina (2005–2016). He advised SVB Leerink (2014–2019), and currently advises Illumina Ventures (since 2016).

Between 1986 and 2003, Rastetter held positions as President, Chief Executive Officer, Chief Financial Officer and director at IDEC Pharmaceuticals. At IDEC, Rastetter was a co-inventor of and developed Rituxan, the first monoclonal antibody (MAB) to be approved by the U.S. FDA for cancer therapy. In 2003, Idec merged with Biogen to form the third largest biotech firm in the United States. Rastetter was Executive Chair of the new company, Biogen IDEC, from 2003 to 2005.

Rastetter was also a co-founder, interim CEO and chairman of Receptos, Inc. a biopharmaceutical company which was bought by Celgene Corporation in 2015.

Rastetter has been described as an "omnipotent biotech force" by Alnylam Pharmaceuticals CEO John Maraganore and as an "industry legend" who has deep biotechnology expertise.

== Education ==
William Harry Rastetter was born in 1948 in Panama to Richard William Rastetter and Margaret Van Oot Rastetter. Richard William Rastetter was a commander in the United States Navy and later worked for the State Department. As a result, the family lived in several countries, including Panama, Brazil, and Costa Rica. Rastetter is bilingual in English and Spanish. Rastetter's mother, Margaret Van Oot Rastetter, was an oil painter. She encouraged his interest in the sciences.

Rastetter graduated from high school in Bethesda, Maryland. He went to MIT for his undergraduate work, receiving a bachelor of science (SB) in chemistry in 1971. He earned a master's (MA) in 1972 and a doctoral degree (PhD) in organic chemistry in 1975, both from Harvard University. His advisor at Harvard was Nobel Prize winner Robert Burns Woodward. While at Harvard, Rastetter taught undergraduate classes.

== Personal life ==
William Rastetter was married to illustrator Lucy Sands Dillon on August 21, 1982. He moved to Rancho Santa Fe in 1987.

William Rastetter later married Marisa Gard, an attorney and triathlete who has been featured on the cover of USA Triathlon Life. Marisa Gard Rastetter is a pro bono attorney at the nonprofit San Diego Volunteer Lawyer Program, and runs legal clinics for low-income people, dealing with legal matters as diverse as domestic violence, guardianship, and previously issues relating to HIV and AIDS.

== Career ==
=== MIT ===
Rastetter was an associate professor of chemistry at MIT. He held the Firmenich Endowed Chair (1979–1981) and an Alfred P. Sloan Fellowship (1980–1982).

=== Genentech Inc. ===
Rastetter joined Genentech Inc. in 1982 as a scientist, and directed its Biocatalysts and Chemical Sciences Groups from 1982 to 1984. From 1984 to 1986, he served as Director of Corporate Ventures at Genentech.

=== IDEC Pharmaceuticals / Biogen Idec ===
Rastetter joined IDEC Pharmaceuticals, which was founded in 1985, as of December 1986, shortly after funding of the Series A venture round. In addition to being a director (1986–2003) and chair (1996–2003), he served as chief financial officer (1988–1993), and president and chief executive officer from 1986 to 2003.

While at IDEC, Rastetter was a co-inventor of Rituxan, which it co-marketed with Genentech. Rituxan was the first monoclonal antibody (MAb) to be approved by the FDA (1997) for the treatment of cancer.

A small company strategy is very often driven by becoming the best in the world at doing something that the establishment distrusts, dislikes or does not understand. This was certainly the case at Idec Pharmaceuticals. – Rastetter, 2006

In 2003, Idec Pharmaceuticals merged with Biogen to form the third largest biotech firm in the United States. Following the merger, Rastetter became the executive chair of the new company, Biogen IDEC (2003–2005).

=== LEERINK Partners ===
Rastetter served (2014–2019) as a Member of the Advisory Council for Leerink Partners LLC (for a period SVB Leerink, now Leerink Partners), an investment bank focusing on healthcare. Other members included David Evans Shaw, James R. Tobin, David E.I. Pyott and Francois Nader.

=== Illumina Ventures ===
Rastetter serves as an adviser to Illumina Ventures, which focuses its investments in start-up companies driven by genomics and next generation sequencing technologies. Rastetter served on the board of directors of Illumina, Inc. from 1998 to 2016, and as the non-executive chair of the Board of Directors of Illumina, Inc. from 2005 to 2016.

=== Venrock ===
Rastetter was a partner at the venture capital firm Venrock from 2006 until February 2013.

=== Receptos, Inc. ===
In 2007, Rastetter cofounded Receptos, Inc., a biopharmaceutical company. Rastetter served as interim CEO of Receptos from May 2009 to December 2, 2010; and as a director and chair of the board from May 2009 to August 27, 2015. Receptos was acquired by Celgene Corporation in 2015.

=== Fate Therapeutics ===
Rastetter joined Fate Therapeutics, Inc. on December 14, 2011 as a director and as chair of the board. Rastetter served as the Interim CEO at Fate Therapeutics from February 2012 to October 15, 2012, when Christian Weyer became president and CEO; Bob Valamehr is Fate's current president and CEO. Rastetter has continued as chair of the board of directors.

=== Neurocrine Biosciences, Inc. ===
Rastetter has been a Director at Neurocrine Biosciences, Inc. since February 8, 2010, and the chair of the board of Neurocrine since May 25, 2011.

=== Cerulean Pharma Inc. / Daré Bioscience ===
Rastetter was involved in the funding of Cerulean Pharma, Inc. as early as 2009. He became a Director of Cerulean Pharma in January 2014. He served as its Lead Independent Director from April 2014 to June 2016, and as chair of the board at Cerulean Pharma Inc. from June 2016 to July 2017.

Effective as of July 20, 2017, Daré Bioscience Operations, Inc. became a wholly owned subsidiary of Cerulean Pharma Inc., and Cerulean changed its name to Daré Bioscience, Inc. Rastetter now serves on the board of directors and as chair of the board of Daré Bioscience.

=== Regulus Therapeutics, Inc. ===
Rastetter was appointed to the board of directors at Regulus Therapeutics Inc. as of April 1, 2013, and served on the board of directors until the company's acquisition by Novartis in June 2025.

Iambic Therapeutics, Inc.

Rastetter was appointed to the board of directors at Iambic Therapeutics, Inc. as of May 2023, and was named Chairman of the Board as of Oct 2026 upon the company's IPO on NASDAQ.

=== Caltech ===
Rastetter served on the board of trustees of Caltech from October 28, 2015 to 2018.

=== GRAIL, Inc. ===
Rastetter served on the board (2016–2020) of GRAIL, Inc., a life sciences company in Menlo Park, California that focuses on early cancer detection using deep genome sequencing; the company was a spinoff of Illumina and Google. Rastetter served as chair (2017–2018) and as interim CEO (2017) during a leadership transition at the company which resulted in the hiring of Jennifer Cook. GRAIL's CEO was Hans Bishop at the time of its acquisition by Illumina in 2020 which was disputed by the FTC and European authorities. Illumina divested Grail (GRAL, NASDAQ) under regulatory pressure in June 2024.

== Photography ==
Rastetter has a lifelong interest in photography, which began at age 11, when his mother gave him a Kodak box camera. He experiments with techniques to overlay images and to take extremely long exposures of up to 12 minutes using medium and large format cameras such as the Hasselblad H6D-100c. He has exhibited at the Joseph Bellows Gallery, the Madison Gallery, and L&G Projects in La Jolla, California; and at the Oceanside Museum of Art in Oceanside, California; and at The Ida and Cecil Green Faculty Club at the University of California, San Diego.

== Awards ==
- 2024, Rell Sunn Award, UCSD Cancer Center
- 2023, Junior Achievement San Diego Business Hall of Fame
- 2018, Biotechnology Heritage Award, Biotechnology Industry Organization (BIO) and Science History Institute
- 2015, Lifetime Achievement Award, Corporate Directors Forum
- 2015, Life Sciences Leadership Award, Pantheon DiNA Awards, California Life Sciences Association (CLSA)
- 2007, CONNECT Entrepreneur Hall of Fame, San Diego
- 2002, Jacob and Louise Gabbay Award in Biotechnology and Medicine
- 1998, Ernst & Young Entrepreneur of the Year Award, Biotechnology, San Diego
- Peer-Elected Awards from The Biotech Meeting at Laguna Niguel:
  - 1998 Best of Biotech, New Therapeutic Product, Rituxan
  - 2001 Biotech Hall of Fame, Leading Company, IDEC Pharmaceuticals
  - 2002 Biotech Hall of Fame, Special Recognition for an Individual
  - 2002 Best of Biotech, Best New Approved Product, Zevalin
  - 2003 Biotech Hall of Fame, Scientific Achievement, shared with Drs. Anderson, Hanna and Grillo-Lopez
