= Joy Onaolapo =

Nigerian Paralympic weightlifter

Personal information
- Born: 24 December 1982 Sapele, Nigeria
- Died: July 2013 (aged 30)

Sport
- Country: Nigeria
- Sport: Paralympic powerlifting

Joy Onaolapo (24 December 1982 in Sapele, Nigeria – July 2013) was a Nigerian champion Paralympic weightlifter (2012). She won the gold medal in the 52 kg powerlifting category at the 2012 London games.

Onaolapo was confirmed dead in July 2013 at the age of 30. Nigerian former President Goodluck Ebele Jonathan described "the death of the Nigerian Paralympian gold medallist, Mrs. Joy Onaolapo as a big loss to the nation." Coach Ijeoma Iheriobim, "has described late Onaolapo as a committed and diligent athlete."
