= Charles Molette =

French Roman Catholic priest and archivist

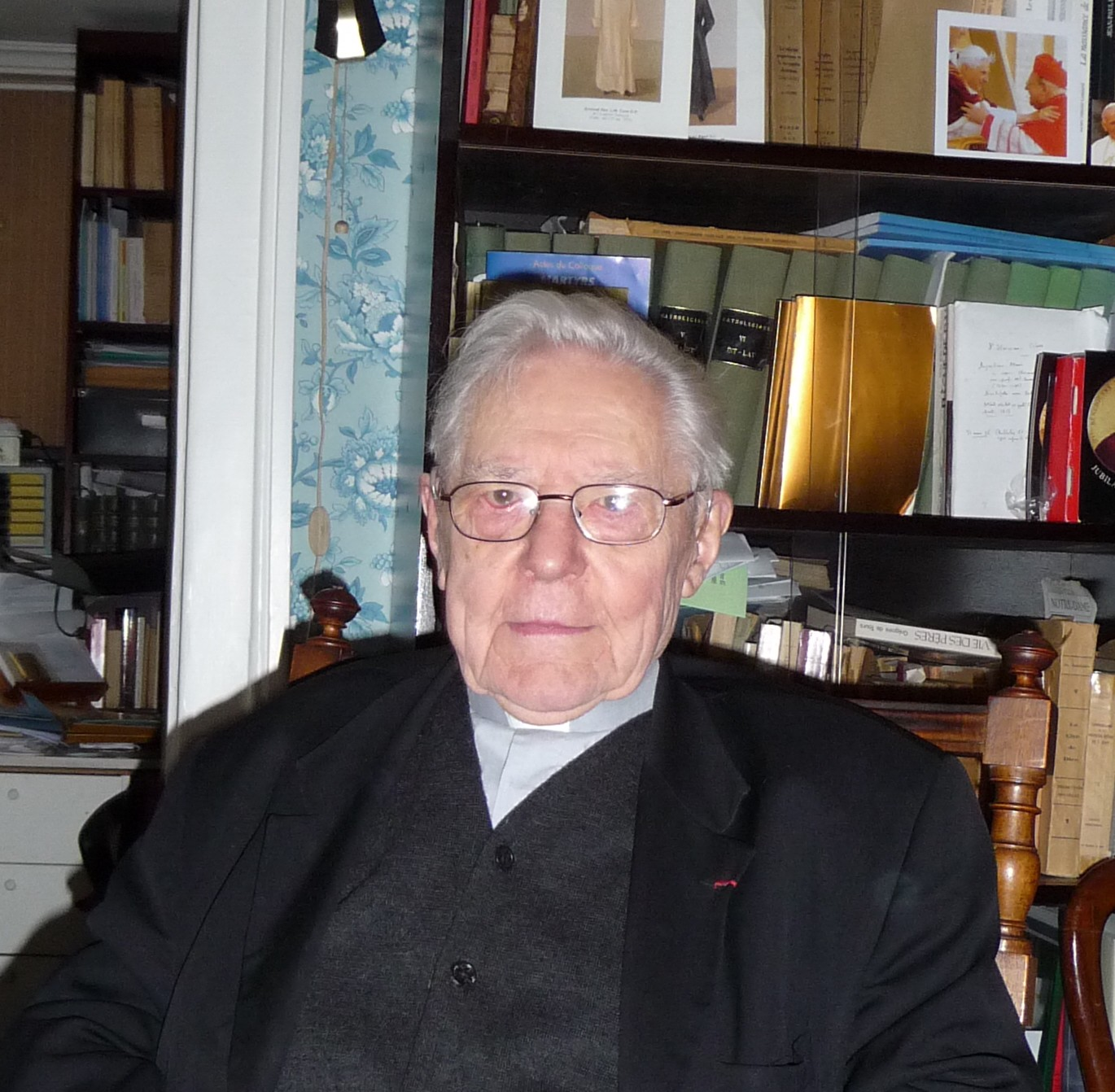
- Charles Molette in 2009
- Born: 21 June 1918
- Died: 4 August 2013 (aged 95)
- Occupations: Priest, archivist

Charles Molette (1918–2013) was a French Roman Catholic priest and archivist. He won five prizes from the Académie française: the Prix Montyon for L’Association catholique de la jeunesse française in 1969; the Prix du cardinal Grente for Albert de Mun in 1971; the Prix Lafontaine for Un chemin de feu (Mère Laurentia Sibien, 1891–1943) in 1980; the Prix Véga et Lods de Wegmann for La vérité où je la trouve : Mulla Zadé in 1989; and the Prix du cardinal Grente for the entirety of his work in 1993.
