= Don Friedman (politician) =

American politician

William Donald Friedman (March 21, 1930 – August 11, 2013) was an American businessman, talk-show host, and politician.

Born in Denver, Colorado, Friedman received his bachelor's degree from Wesleyan University and his master's degree from the University of California, Berkeley and was a real estate developer and mobile home park operator.

Friedman served in the Colorado House of Representatives from 1962 to 1976 as a Republican. He gave up his legislative seat in an unsuccessful bid for Congress against Democratic incumbent Patricia Schroeder.

Later he was a talk-show host on Denver-area radio stations, where he often took a controversial Republican stance. He died in Englewood, Colorado on August 11, 2013.
