= Amer Abdel Maksoud =

Egyptian footballer

- عامر عبد المقصود
- Born: Giza, Egypt
- Died: 14 August 2013; Cairo, Egypt

Amer Abdel Maksoud (Arabic: عامر عبد المقصود) (Giza, – Cairo, 14 August 2013) was a Brigadier General in the Egyptian Police Force. He was martyred in the Kerdasa massacre on the 14th of August 2013.

== Biography ==
Amer Abdel Maksoud debuted as a professional footballer in 1980 with Tersana SC. With the club, he won an Egypt Cup in 1983 and played in 1987's African Cup Winners' Cup, reaching the quarterfinals against Espérance Sportive de Tunis Amer Abdel Maksoud Tersana retired in 1993, playing throughout his football career at the same club.

Amer Abdel Maksoud died on 14 August 2013 after being killed by a terrorist group.
