= Eva J. Engel =

Eva J. Engel, later known as Eva Engel-Holland (18 August 1919 in Dortmund – 30 August 2013 in Göttingen) was a scholar of German studies and an important editor of the collected works of Moses Mendelssohn.

== Biography ==
Eva Johanna Engel, born in 1919, was the oldest of three children in a Jewish family in Dortmund. Her father, Stefan Engel, was a pediatrician and professor of pediatrics. She grew up in Westend, Berlin. After the Nazis came to power in 1933, the Engel family faced growing oppression under Nazism, and they emigrated in 1936 to Great Britain and settled in London. The mother, Margerethe Katharina, née Litten, died there two years later. An aunt who stayed behind in Germany was deported and murdered.

Engel studied German, Latin, and Romance studies at King's College London. Afterwards she worked for 12 years as a high school teacher of Latin, Roman history, and German, before she could continue her studies in German, Italian, and Indo-European languages at Cornell University. She earned a PhD with a dissertation on the ethics and aesthetics of Karl Philipp Moritz. She then taught at the University of London, Cambridge University, and Keele University, and she was a visiting professor at Harvard University. In 1967 she was appointed a professor of German studies at Wellesley College, near Boston. In the United States she met Orthodox Rabbi Alexander Altmann, the editor of the anniversary edition of Moses Mendelssohn's collected works, with whom she then collaborated.

Eva Engel was married to Albert Edward Holland (1912–1984), a historian and early president of Hobart and William Smith Colleges as well as vice-president of Wellesley College. On 14 October 2013 her ashes were interred in the RuheForst Vorharz in Heiningen, Lower Saxony.

== Work ==
Engel became fascinated by Moses Mendelssohn in the mid-1950s after she began her research into the late Enlightenment philosopher Karl Philipp Moritz and the view of Jewish philosophers on the autonomy of art. Beginning in 1972 she was the editor of the critical edition of the works of Moses Mendelssohn, comprising one-fourth of his complete works.

After the death of her husband, Engel returned to German in 1984. Alexander Altmann died in 1987. According to his wishes she became co-editor of the anniversary edition of Moses Mendelssohn: Collected Works. She worked from 1988 in the Herzog August Library in Wolfenbüttel, whose director, Paul Raabe, supported her research project on Mendelssohn's work by arranging for a grant from the German Research Foundation and providing a work room. Under the editorship of Altmann and Engel, the number of published volumes increased to 33.

Her own publications, beginning in 1960, encompassed some 13 books and 30 extensive essays on Moses Mendelssohn and on the intellectual history of the 18th century.

Beginning in 2007 she invested great effort toward the establishment of the Dessau Moses Mendelssohn Foundation for the Promotion of the Arts and Humanities (Dessauer Moses Mendelssohn Stiftung zur Förderung der Geisteswissenschaften). A predecessor of this organization by the same name was launched by Albert Einstein and others in 1929. In spring 2013 the first Dessau Moses Mendelssohn Prize for the Promotion of the Arts and Humanities was awarded to philosopher Anne Pollok, who is from Germany and who teaches in the United States.

== Awards ==
- Order of Merit of the Federal Republic of Germany 1st Class (May 17, 1999)

== Writings (selected) ==
- Jean Paul's Schulmeisterlein Wutz, 1962
- German Narrative Prose, two volumes, London 1965 and 1968
- Moses Mendelssohns Briefwechsel mit Lessing, Abbt und Iselin, 1994
- Neues zur Lessing-Forschung (mit Ingrid Strohschneider-Kohrs und Claus Ritterhoff), 1998
- Moses Mendelssohn und die europäische Aufklärung. Der "Sokrates des 18. Jahrhunderts", 1999
- (Hrsg. mit Michael Albrecht): Moses Mendelssohn im Spannungsfeld der Aufklärung, 2000
- Judentum - Wege zur geistigen Befreiung. Dessauer Herbstseminare 2000 und 2001 zur Geschichte der Juden in Deutschland, 2002
- Moses Mendelssohn und Shakespeare, in: Roger Paulin: Shakespeare im 18. Jahrhundert, Wallstein Verlag 2007, S. 157f.
