= Leo Fraser =

American lawyer, businessman, and politician

Leo W. Fraser, Jr. (December 8, 1926 – August 9, 2013) was an American lawyer, businessman, and politician.

Born in Boston, Massachusetts, Fraser served in the United States Marine Corps 1944–1946. He then received his degree from Northeastern University and his law degree from the New England School of Law. He was a claim adjuster in Boston. In 1970 he moved to Pittsfield, New Hampshire, serving as the New Hampshire Insurance Commissioner. In 1976 he established Fraser Financial Services in Pittsfield. A Republican, he served in the New Hampshire House of Representatives from 1985 to 1991 and then in the New Hampshire State Senate from 1991 to 2002. He died in Concord, New Hampshire.
