= Martin Geoffrey Low =

Molecular cell biologist

- Born: 27 July 1950; Southport
- Died: 6 August 2013 (aged 63); United States
- Resting place: Central New York Crematory, Cortland, New York
- Citizenship: United Kingdom

Martin Low FRS (27 July 1950 – 6 August 2013) was a molecular cell biologist who discovered GPI (glycosylphosphatidylinositol) membrane anchors in eukaryotic cells. Low grew up in Southport, Lancashire, a seaside resort in northwest England.

He was elected Fellow of the Royal Society in 1996.
