= Donald Ungurait =

American academic

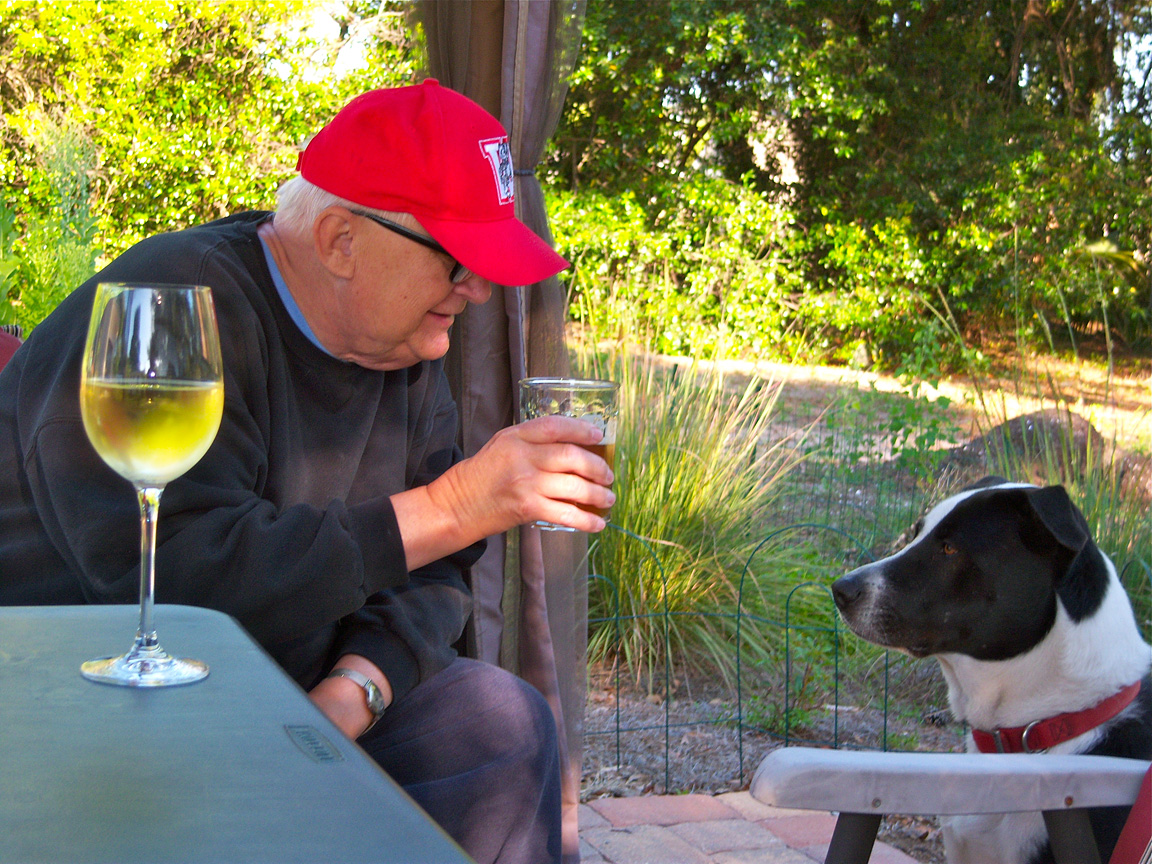
Don & Sabre

Donald F. Ungurait (1936-2013) was the founding Dean of the Florida State University (FSU) Film School., and has directed more than 50 plays, musicals and operas and received more than 200 producer-director credits.

Ungurait received his BA at Indiana State University and MA and PhD at the University of Wisconsin–Madison. He joined the FSU faculty in 1968 and retired as associate professor of communication in 2003.

The Association of Independent Commercial Producers recognized him as the Film Educator of the Decade in 1990. Florida State has twice recognized him with the Seminole Award for Leadership and Service, and once with the Provost's Award for Excellence in Undergraduate Instruction.
