= Buurtpoes Bledder =

Dutch cat (c. 2011–2013)

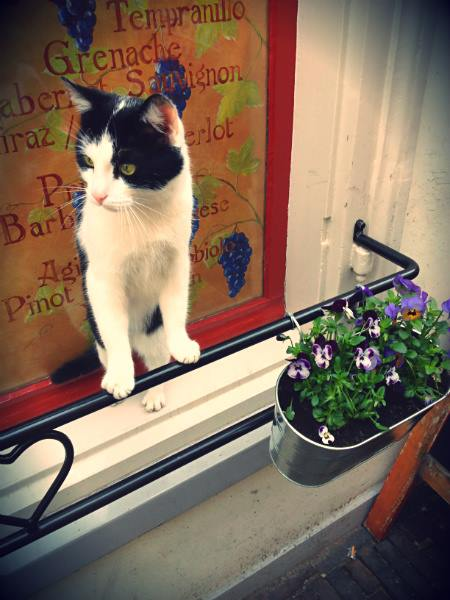
- Buurtpoes Bledder in April 2013
- Other names: Jacco, Chardonnay, Danger Cat, etc.
- Species: Felis catus
- Sex: Male
- Born: 2011
- Died: August 7, 2013; Leiden, South Holland, The Netherlands
- Years active: 2012–2013
- Owner: Minerva Student House Hartesteeg

Buurtpoes Bledder (c. 2011 – August 7, 2013) was a male domestic cat who attracted national media attention in the Netherlands after becoming a regular fixture at various businesses in Leiden's central district. His exploits became the subject of several news reports and inspired a Facebook fan page that attracted over 1,300 followers from around the world. Bledder died after being struck by an unknown motorist near his home in Leiden.

== Biography ==
Bledder was adopted by the residents of a student house in Leiden in the spring of 2012. They named him Jacco. The following summer, they began allowing him to roam the neighborhood. The cat's curiosity and love for human company encouraged him to explore the many cafes, shops, bars and offices around the Nieuwe Rijn, the city's historic central district. While some business owners didn't approve of his presence, others welcomed him. Bledder became a "regular" at the Cafe Jantje van Leiden, a brown bar, De Twee Spieghels, a jazz cafe, De Bierwinkel Leiden, a shop that specializes in imported beers, and Velvet, a record store. The cat was given many nicknames in the months that followed by various clerks, restaurateurs, neighbors and customers. Among them: Danger Cat, Chardonnay, Prinsje, Roof Cat and Sweetheart, in addition to Jacco, his "real" name.

In September 2012, a clerk at Velvet created a Facebook fanpage in honor of the cat and, not knowing his real name or where he lived, dubbed him "Buurtpoes Bledder." This nickname, which would go on to become the cat's best known moniker, combines a mix of Dutch words and regional terms. "Buurtpoes" translates as "neighborhood cat" but "Bledder" has multiple definitions. The clerk included "Bledder" because of the cat's white and black coloring, which made him resemble a soccer ball. This word means "ball" or "bald."

The Facebook page quickly drew seven hundred followers and reached an eventual peak of around 1,300 followers in 2015, many of whom posted anecdotes and photos of the cat's adventures around Leiden. Bledder's insatiable curiosity got him into plenty of trouble during his short lifetime. He was retrieved from a canal with a field hockey stick one afternoon and often ran around in the rain gutter on the roof of the student house whenever he could sneak out a window on the top floor. In the autumn of 2012, he became trapped up there after the window swung shut behind him. His owners were away on a weekend retreat and the cat spent the night on the roof and endured a fierce thunderstorm. He was rescued the following morning by the Leiden Fire Department after neighbors heard him meowing.

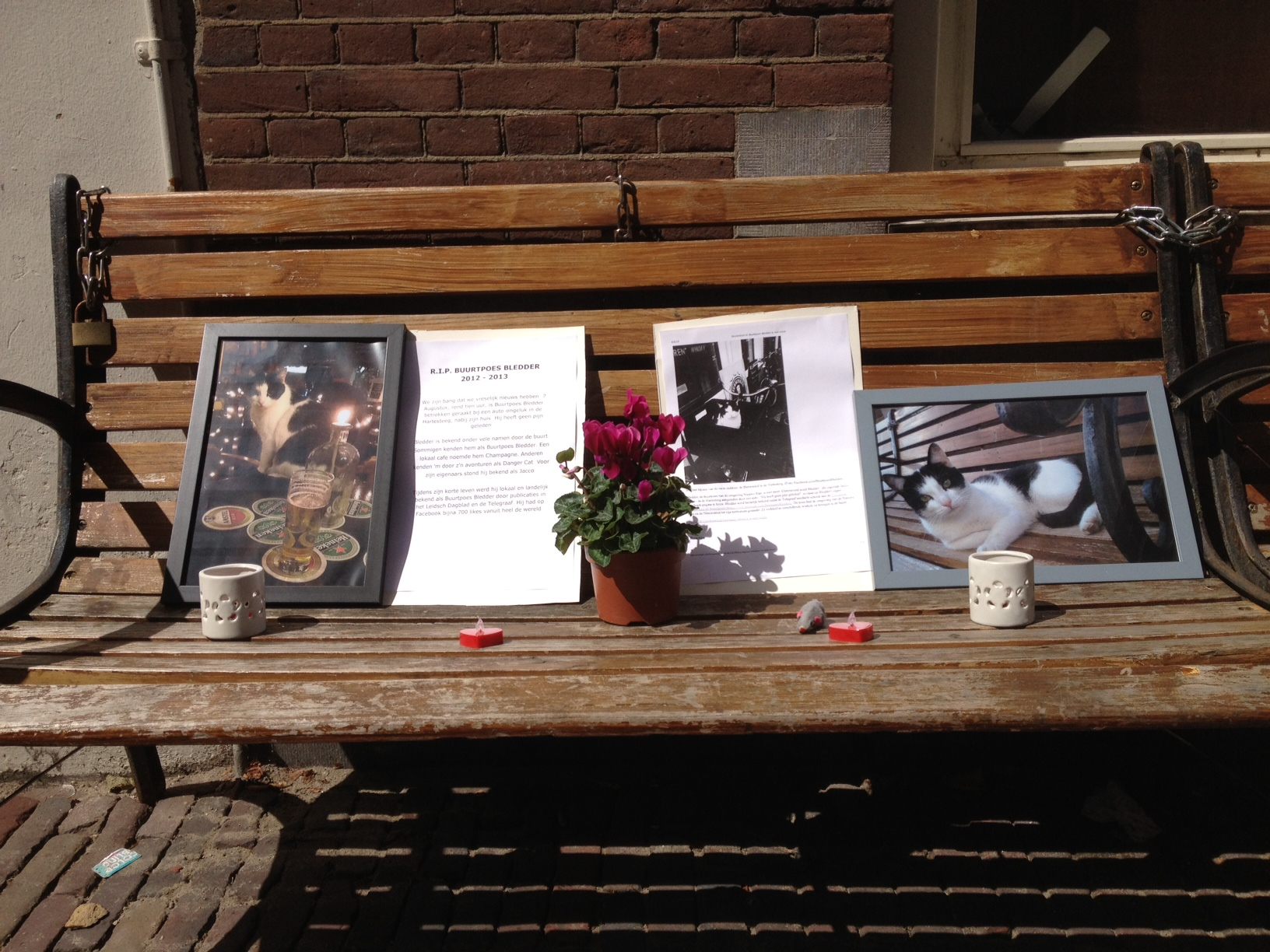
A small memorial for Buurtpoes Bledder at the Cafe Jantje van Leiden, August 2013

Bledder went missing in January 2013, causing many of his fans to worry and speculate over his whereabouts. He was returned to his owners three weeks later. A couple who lived in a house a few blocks away had discovered Bledder, assumed he was a stray and adopted him. A friend later informed them of the cat's Facebook page and they took him home.

== Death ==
On the night of August 7, 2013, Bledder was hit and killed by an unknown motorist. Local residents built a memorial for him outside the Cafe van Jantje. The cat's death was covered by several media outlets, including the Leidsch Dagblad, the national daily paper De Telegraaf and SBS6, a national television station. Bledder's Facebook page also received hundreds of condolences from his fans. "Buurtpoes" was declared the Word of the Year by Leidsch Dagblad in December 2013.

There was public discussion over what to do with his remains. His owners considered the possibility of having the cat stuffed and placed on permanent display at the Cafe van Jantje. The media attention and debate over Bledder's final resting place led an artist at the Leidsch Dagblad, the city's daily newspaper, to create an editorial cartoon mocking his postmortem popularity. It was published on Saturday, August 17, 2013. Eventually, the decision was made by his owners to have him stuffed and placed on display in their house on the Hartesteeg. On the fifth anniversary of Bledder's death, he was briefly moved to the Velvet record shop along the Oude Rijn.
