= Ulvis Katlaps =

Latvian ice hockey player

- Born: March 20, 1968 Riga, Latvian SSR, USSR
- Died: August 20, 2013 (aged 45) Waukesha, Wisconsin
- Height: 6 ft 2 in (188 cm)
- Weight: 188 lb (85 kg; 13 st 6 lb)
- Position: Defence
- Caught: Left
- Played for: Juniors Riga; University of Wisconsin; Dynamo Riga
- Playing career: 1985–1996

Ulvis Katlaps (March 3, 1968 – August 20, 2013) was a Latvian professional ice hockey defenceman. He played in the Soviet Championship League for five seasons with the Dynamo Riga. Katlaps played two seasons in the United States with the University of Wisconsin in NCAA hockey league. He graduated from Wisconsin with a degree in journalism and worked as a trader with Skylands Capital. After his hockey career he coached junior hockey with Wisconsin AAA and Milwaukee Jr. Admirals.

In August 2013, he was diagnosed with an advanced stage of stomach cancer and died on August 20 at the age of 45. Katlaps is survived by wife Kelly and two children.

== Career statistics ==
| Career | | | Regular season | | | | | Playoffs |
| Season | Team | League | GP | G | A | Pts | PIM | GP | G | A | Pts | PIM |
|---|---|---|---|---|---|---|---|---|---|---|---|---|
| 1985–86 | Dynamo Riga | Soviet | 19 | 1 | 0 | 1 | 8 | — | — | — | — | — |
| 1986–87 | Dynamo Riga | Soviet | 37 | 0 | 0 | 0 | 4 | — | — | — | — | — |
| 1987–88 | Dynamo Riga | Soviet | 48 | 2 | 2 | 4 | 12 | — | — | — | — | — |
| 1989–90 | Dynamo Riga | Soviet | 44 | 5 | 3 | 8 | 14 | — | — | — | — | — |
| 1990–91 | Dynamo Riga | Soviet | 28 | 0 | 2 | 2 | 4 | — | — | — | — | — |
| 1992–93 | University of Wisconsin | NCAA | 41 | 4 | 31 | 35 | 20 | — | — | — | — | — |
| 1993–94 | University of Wisconsin | NCAA | 42 | 5 | 25 | 30 | 18 | — | — | — | — | — |
| 1995–96 | Juniors Riga | EEHL | 4 | 0 | 4 | 4 | 0 | — | — | — | — | — |

=== International ===
| Year | Team | Comp | GP | G | A | Pts | PIM |
|---|---|---|---|---|---|---|---|
| 1994 | Latvia | WC B | 7 | 1 | 3 | 4 | 2 |
| Senior int'l Totals | | | 7 | 1 | 3 | 4 | 2 |
