= Ronald Siwani =

South African cricketer (1980–2013)

Personal information
- Full name: Mziwmkosi Ronald Siwani
- Born: 16 September 1980; King William's Town, Eastern Cape, South Africa
- Died: 3 August 2013 (aged 32); King William's Town, Eastern Cape, South Africa
- Source: ESPNcricinfo, 1 June 2016

Mziwmkosi Ronald Siwani (16 September 1980 – 3 August 2013) was a South African cricketer. He played two List A matches for North West in 2002/03.
