= Bob Thomas (Nevada politician) =

American politician

Bob Thomas (February 14, 1926 – August 10, 2013) was an American businessman, newspaper columnist, and politician.

Born in Indianapolis, Indiana, Thomas served in the United States Army Air Forces 1944–1945. He then received his associate degree from Long Beach City College and his bachelor's degree from University of California, Los Angeles. He worked in electronic musical instruments and was corporate president. He served on the Carson City, Nevada school board and was president of the school board. Thomas served in the Nevada Assembly as a Republican 1982–1988. Thomas wrote a newspaper column in the Nevada Appeal.
