= Ruthe Jackson =

American politician (1920–2013)

Grand Prairie City Council Place 7 at large
- In office 1993–2013

Grand Prairie City Council Place 5
- In office 1985–1991

Personal details
- Born: October 29, 1920 Fort Worth, Texas
- Died: August 9, 2013 (aged 92)
- Party: Independent
- Spouse: Vernon A. Jackson
- Children: 2
- Occupation: Community organizer

Ruthe Jackson (October 29, 1920 - August 9, 2013) was an American community organizer. She held a seat on the city council of Grand Prairie, Texas, and produced and hosted the longest-running Public-access television cable TV show in Texas. She was considered by many to be the matriarch of Grand Prairie, Texas.

== Biography ==
=== Early life and education ===
Jackson was born October 29, 1920, in Fort Worth, Texas, the oldest daughter of Florence Ector Thompson and John Lyle Thompson. Her family moved to Grand Prairie in 1931 and she graduated from Sunset High School in 1938. Jackson completed certificate work at Fort Worth Christian College and Christian College of the Southwest and earned professional parliamentarian certification from La Salle Extension University in 1972.

=== Career ===
During World War II Jackson worked at North American Aviation, Inc. in Grand Prairie. After the war and a short time working at Sargent & Sowell Co. Ruthe co-founded All-Quality Sign & Mfg.Co. with Ernest Seymour. They specialized in silk screened metal signs. In 1947, along with husband Vernon Jackson, they formed Jackson Vending Supply, Inc. A successful distributor of vending machines and equipment till they sold the business in 1998. Ruthe stayed employed with the company that became Product Sales, Inc. as a marketing & Public Relations Consultant.

Jackson served as a Dallas County School Board member from 1975–1992, representing Community District 4. Beginning in 1980, she began producing and hosting the public-access television series It's Happening in Grand Prairie, still in production, later adding It Happened in Grand Prairie, a series of history interviews, beginning in 1985, and various specials including "Women in History" documentaries. Jackson was elected to the Texas State Board of Education in 1984 but did not get to serve as the Legislature canceled the elected board and appointed the entire State Board.

She was first elected to the Grand Prairie City Council in 1985, serving on the council's Place 5 and as mayor pro-tem in 1986, 1987, 1988, and 1990 before her term ended in 1991. In 1993 she was re-elected, this time to Place 7 on the council, and served as mayor pro-tem again in 1999 and 2002. As a council member, Jackson served on the Safety Health & Environment Committee and as the Trinity Trails representative for Council. In 1994 she was appointed co-chairman of the closure operation of Naval Air Station Dallas, presenting a NAS Dallas service plaque at the closure ceremony in 1998.

Jackson has been a member of and held leadership positions in many associations related to her interests and vocation, including city and county historical commissions; city, state, and the National Association of Parliamentarians; the Grand Prairie Chamber of Commerce; Keep America Beautiful and Keep Texas Beautiful; PTA, holding Life Membership in both the Texas PTA and National PTA; and Soroptimist.

=== Marriage and children ===
In 1944, while working at North American, Ruthe met and married Vernon Jackson. They had two daughters, Xanna Jackson Young and Jorja Jackson Clemson, who is now a council member of District 1 in Grand Prairie, and several grandchildren and 13 great-grandchildren.

== Death ==
Jackson died on August 9, 2013, aged 92.

== Awards and honors ==
- 1977: Lady Bird Johnson Environmental Award, Keep America Beautiful
- 1985: Woman of Distinction Award, Soroptimist International of the Americas
- 1990: Paul Harris Fellow, Rotary
- 1991: Vernon & Ruthe Jackson Day named March 5, 1991, Texas Legislature Session, House Resolution #270, by State Representative Bill Arnold
- 1992: Day-Jackson Educational Facility renaming
- 1992: Outdoor Learning Center in Turner Park renamed the Ruthe & Vernon Jackson Outdoor Learning Center
- 1998: Outstanding Community Volunteer Award, Keep America Beautiful
- 2000: Texas Community Forestry Award of Merit, by Texas Forest Service, Texas Urban Forestry Council & Texas Chapter of the International Society of Arboriculture
- 2001: National Award for Excellence in Community Service, National Society of the Daughters of the American Revolution
- 2001: Vernon & Ruthe Jackson "House Concurrent Resolution No 126, February 21, 2001, adopted by the House and Senate bodies commending same for outstanding community service by the 77th Legislature of the State of Texas, sponsored by State Representatives Ray Allen and Toby Goodman and State Senator Jane Nelson.
- 2002: State of Texas Senate Proclamation #1294 for community service, presented by Senator Royce West
- 2002: opening of Ruthe Jackson Center, a community center in Grand Prairie
- 2005: Robert M. Artz Award for Citizen Volunteer and Leadership Contributions, National Recreation and Parks Association
- 2008: President's Volunteer Service Award
