= Joseph Hoàng Văn Tiệm =

Vietnamese Roman Catholic bishop

Joseph Hoàng Văn Tiệm S.D.B.
- Bishop of Bùi Chu
- Church: Catholic Church
- Diocese: Diocese of Bùi Chu
- In office: 4 July 2001 – 17 August 2013
- Predecessor: Joseph Marie Vû Duy Nhất
- Successor: Thomas Vũ Đình Hiệu

Orders
- Ordination: 19 April 1973
- Consecration: 8 August 2001 by Paul Joseph Phạm Đình Tụng

Personal details
- Born: September 12, 1938 Hải Sơn, Hải Hậu district, Nam Định province, Tonkin, French Indochina, French Empire
- Died: August 17, 2013 (aged 74) Xuân Ngọc, Xuân Trường district, Nam Định province, Vietnam

Joseph Hoàng Văn Tiệm (September 12, 1938 − August 17, 2013) was a Vietnamese Roman Catholic bishop.

Ordained to the priesthood in 1973, Hoàng Văn Tiệm was named bishop of the Roman Catholic Diocese of Bùi Chu, Vietnam and died in 2013 while still in office.
