= Vin Evans =

English cricketer

Personal information
- Full name: William Vincent Evans
- Born: 19 February 1935; Stockton-on-Tees, County Durham, England
- Died: 14 August 2013 (aged 78)
- Batting: Right-handed
- Role: Wicket-keeper

Domestic team information
- Years: Team
- 1964: Durham

Career statistics
Competition	List A
Matches	1
Runs scored	0
Batting average	0.00
100s/50s	–/–
Top score	0
Balls bowled	–
Wickets	–
Bowling average	–
5 wickets in innings	–
10 wickets in match	–
Best bowling	–
Catches/stumpings	–/–
- Source: Cricinfo, 7 August 2011

William Vincent "Vin" Evans (19 February 1935 – 14 August 2013) was an English cricketer. Evans was a right-handed batsman who fielded as a wicket-keeper. He was born in Stockton-on-Tees, County Durham.

Evans made a single appearance for Durham in a List A match against Sussex in the 1964 Gillette Cup. In this match, he was dismissed for a duck by Tony Buss. Durham were at the time a Minor county, but Evans didn't appear in any Minor counties cricket.
