= Kent Finell =

Swedish radio presenter and producer

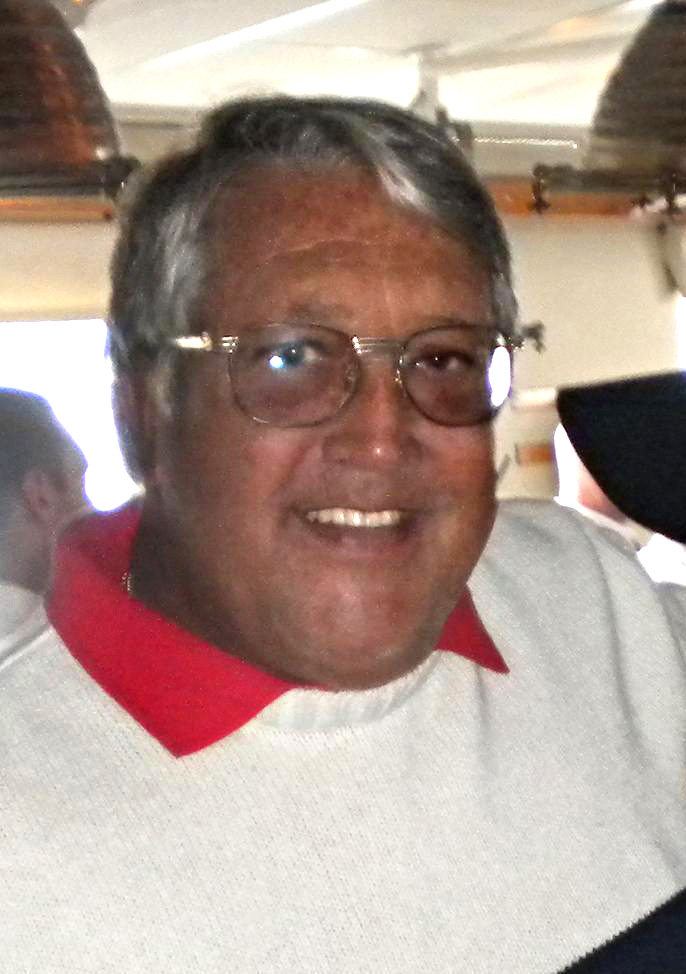
- Kent Finell
- Born: 12 July 1944; Karlstad, Sweden
- Died: 27 August 2013 (aged 69); Stockholm, Sweden
- Occupations: radio presenter, producer

Kent Finell (12 July 1944 – 27 August 2013) was a Swedish radio presenter and producer. He is best known for hosting the Sveriges Radio programme Svensktoppen between 1973 until 1975, from 1979 until 1980, and again from 1987 until 2002.

Born in Karlstad in 1944, he joined Sveriges Radio in 1965 as a reporter. In 1969, he moved to Stockholm, where he was hired by SR as producer of the entertainment department for the radio.

Since 1973, he was known for hosting radio programmes such as Svensktoppen which he hosted for 21 years between 1973 until 2002. He provided SR radio commentary for the Eurovision Song Contest between 1978 until 1980 and from 1982 until 1983 and again in 1989.

== Death ==
Kent Finell died in Stockholm on 27 August 2013, aged 69, from undisclosed causes.
