= Steven Tari =

Papuan cult leader

Steven Garasai Tari
- Born: 1971; Manus, Papua New Guinea
- Died: 29 August 2013 (aged 41-42); Gal, Madang Province, Papua New Guinea
- Other name: Black Jesus
- Occupation: Religious cult leader
- Status: Escaped; subsequently killed
- Convictions: Murder, rape
- Penalty: 20 years in prison

Steven Garasai Tari (1971 – 29 August 2013), also known as Black Jesus, was a Papua New Guinean religious figure, leader of a Christian-influenced cargo cult, who claimed to be the Messiah or the Christ, and is notorious for alleged rape and murder.

He was convicted of four counts of rape in 2010 and sentenced to 20 years in prison. He escaped in March 2013, and remained at large for several months, until he was hacked to death by villagers on 29 August 2013.

== Early life ==
Tari was born on Manus Island in 1971. He studied to become a Lutheran minister at Amron Bible College in Madang, but left the school prematurely after rejecting the teachings of the Bible, leaving behind both his clothing and his belongings. He retreated into the mountain village of Gal, where he formed a personality cult around himself as the Messiah, adopting the moniker "Black Jesus".

== Cult leader ==
Tari's cult, which is estimated to have numbered as many as 6,000, became notorious for its alleged use of "flower girls" who served as concubines for Tari. The girls dress in scant clothing. The Lutheran Church, very prominent in Papua New Guinea, declared Tari an "enemy of the church".

Tari was pursued by Royal Papua New Guinea Constabulary police in 2005 as a result of his teachings.

The first rape/murder accusation against Tari involves the fate of Rita Herman, who joined the cult at age 13 as a personal "flower girl" of the self-styled messiah. According to accusations, in October 2006, Tari and a select circle of his ex-Lutheran aides, along with Barmarhal Herman, the girl's mother and reported "queen" of the flower girls, took 14-year-old Rita into a private tent where she was raped by Tari. Barmarhal instructed her daughter to submit, as she and her family would be blessed by Tari and would receive great gifts of material goods and wealth as reward for the ritual.

After the rape, Tari killed the girl with multiple knife stabs. Barmarhal's other daughter had been previously jailed for being one of Tari's flower girls. Barmarhal has denied being present at the event.

Tari was initially captured in 2005, but escaped prior to his trial with the help of a Lutheran pastor, Logan Sapus, who had been assigned to counsel him but became converted to Tari's cult instead. Back in the jungle, Tari cultivated an honour guard and recruited a new crop of flower girls from the remote villages, promising them blessings of wealth in exchange. Tari enlisted only virgins, reportedly some as young as 8 years old. About 50 of Tari's followers, including about 30 flower girls, were rounded up in an operation in June 2006. Those followers publicly renounced Tari and reconciled with their churches.

== Capture, escape and death ==
In 2007, Tari was captured after rival villagers traveled into his mountain stronghold at Matepi village, in the Transgogol area of Madang Province. One of the villagers climbed into a tree to obtain a cellphone signal and called the authorities. A team of Madang police officers, consisting of Madangs Fox Unit embarked on capturing Tari. The small team was led by then Police Station Commander Jim Namora. The officers clashed with Steven Tari's followers in a shootout before apprehending him. Steven Tari was taken to Jomba police Station and was later moved to Beon.

Tari's appearance in court was delayed due to the injuries he suffered in that assault. He appeared in court in October 2007 charged with sexual offences. The claims of murder were never tested in court. He argued in his defence that "Those women were flower-girls and this was the work of the minister and permitted by the religion. And I don’t know if the charges laid against me are wrong or right." Because he had no legal representation the trial was adjourned until December. He was held in Madang's Beon Prison. In April 2010 it was reported that Tari again attempted escape from custody but was caught quickly afterwards. In October 2010 he was found guilty of four counts of rape, and sentenced to twenty years in prison.

On 21 March 2013, Tari escaped with 40 other prisoners in a mass breakout from Beon Prison Camp. On 31 August, police reported that Tari had been killed by the villagers in Gal, a small Madang village, two days earlier, allegedly after murdering a local woman. An investigation is pending, although national newspapers have reported that Tari was "chopped to death" by the angry villagers.
