= Ramon Pereira P. =

Ramón "Monchi" Virgilio Fernando Pereira Pérez (December 15, 1918 – August 12, 2013) was a Panamanian pioneer radio broadcaster who was the founder of various radio stations in Panama during the 1950s. Although he has gained recognition for his role in Panamanian radio, he was also involved in the nation's politics.

== Early life ==
Ramón Virgilio Fernando Pereira Pérez was born on December 15, 1918, in the now-underwater islet of San Juan de Pequení in Gatún near the Panama Canal, Panama. His father, Ramón Pereira Cobián, was a Puerto Rican soldier who was deployed to the Panama Canal zone on behalf of the United States Army during World War I shortly before his birth. His mother was Ana Virginia Pérez Villanueva, a Panamanian woman.

== Radio ==
Pereira Pérez was first suggested to go to Chitré and become a broadcasting innovator by Fernando Jolly, owner of Radio Provincia, the first radio station in Panama, because of his spontaneous ingenuity. Radio broadcasting then became a particular interest Pereira eventually got obsessed with. He first gained popularity upon founding radio programs such as “Los Monarcas del Aire” in the 1950s. He founded the broadcasting stations of Radio Mía and Radio La Montunita and innovated with radio programs with religious devotions, such as the eventual Radio Guadalupe.

== Political career ==
Pereira Pérez was elected by the public during two terms in which he presided over and participated in several commissions of the National Assembly of Panama. In 1955, he became president of the Education, Culture, and Fine Arts Commission and then again in 1966. He, most notably, served as governor of the Province of Panama and was a candidate for presidency in 1964.
