= Malathi Chendur =

Telugu writer (1928–2013)

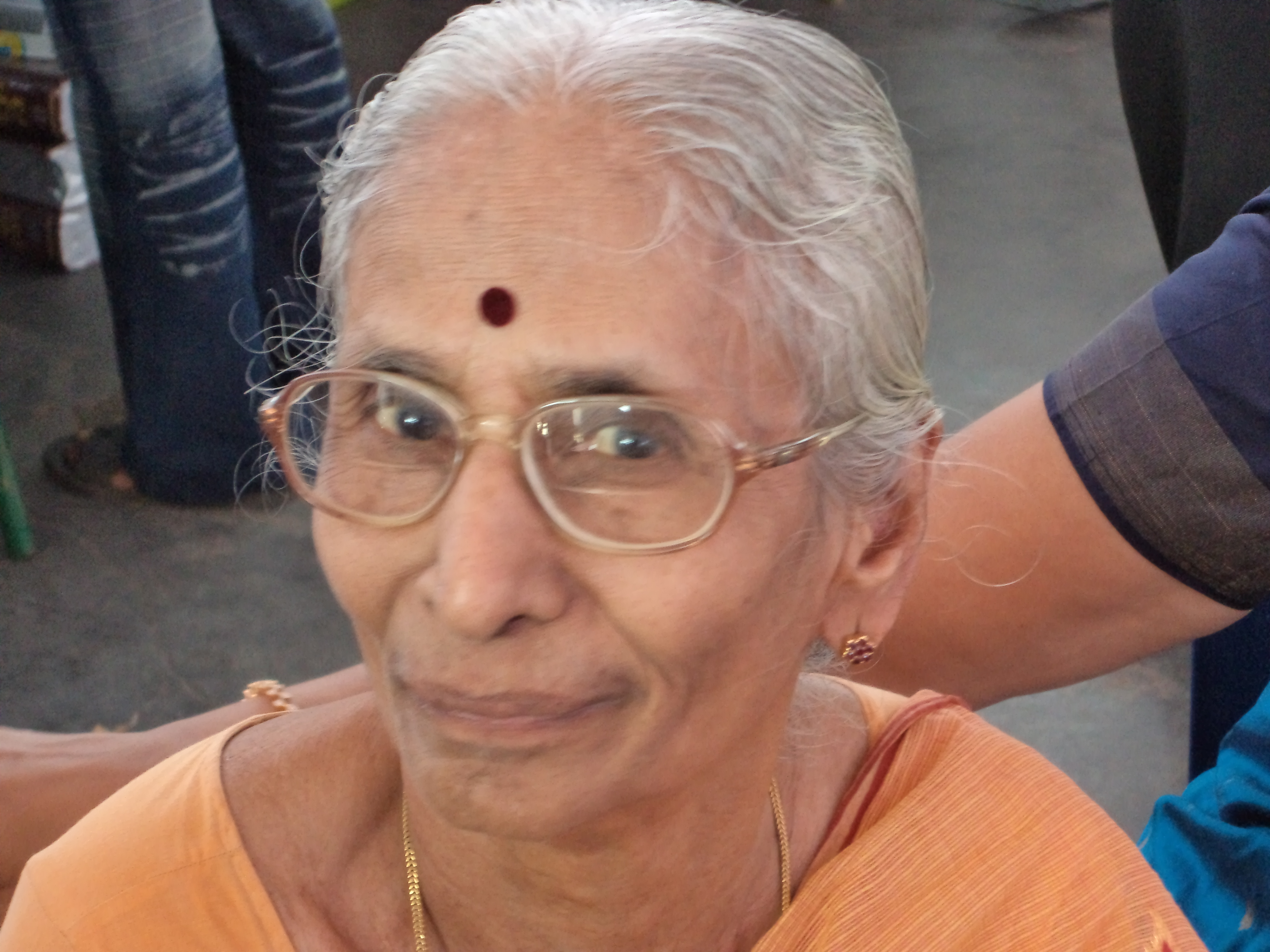
- Malathi Chendur
- Born: 26 December 1928; Nuzvid, Krishna district, Madras Presidency, British India (present-day Andhra Pradesh, India)
- Died: 21 August 2013 (aged 84); Chennai, Tamil Nadu, India
- Education: SSLC
- Occupations: Translator; Novelist; Columnist
- Spouse: Chendur Nageswar Rao
- Writing career
- Notable awards: Sahitya Akademi Award

Malathi Chendur (26 December 1928 – 21 August 2013) was a popular Indian writer, novelist and columnist. She started her career as a novelist in 1949 and went on to write 26 novels in the Telugu language. She also translated more than 300 novels from other languages into Telugu. In 1992, she was awarded the Sahitya Akademi Award for her novel Hrudaya Netri. She wrote a weekly column, "Pramadaavanam", in the Andhra Prabha newspaper which appeared continuously for 47 years.

== Early life, education, and marriage ==
She was born on 26 December 1928 to Venkatachalam (father) and Gnanamba (mother) in Nuzvid, India. Malathi was the sixth and youngest child of her parents. She passed the eighth standard in Nuzvid and went to Eluru for her high school education. In Eluru she stayed at the house of Nageswar Rao Chendur, her maternal uncle. In 1947, both she and Nageswar Rao Chendur went to Madras. Malathi received her Secondary School Leaving Certificate in Madras. At the end of 1947 Malathi married Nageswar Rao Chendur. Their marriage was reported as the first registered marriage after independence in Madras.

== Career ==
In 1949, Chendur started her career as a novelist. In those days she used to narrate her novels on radio. She wrote a weekly column, "Pramadaavanam", in the Andhra Prabha newspaper, in which she answered questions from readers and gave advice on social and personal issues. The column appeared continuously for 47 years.

In 1953, Chendur published a cookbook in Telugu titled Vantalu–Pindivantalu, which was reprinted at least 30 times. Chendur translated many English novels to Telugu and published them under the title Paathakeratalu in the Swathi magazine. Her first novel was Champakam–Cheedapurugulu and her first story was "Ravvaladdulu". Some of her famous novels are Champakam–Cheedapurugulu, Aalochinchu, Sadyogam, Hrudaya Netri, Sisira Vasantham, Manasuloni Manasu, and Bhumi Puthri. She also wrote short stories for weekly magazines. Her novels contain practical solutions for the problems women encounter in daily life. She wrote 26 novels in the Telugu language and translated more than 300 novels from other languages to Telugu, publishing them in five volumes under the title Navala Parichayalu. She was a member of Central Board of Film Certification for 11 years.

== Awards ==
In 1987, Chendur was awarded the Andhra Pradesh Sahitya Akademi Award for her novel Hrudaya Netri. In 1992, she was awarded the Kendra Sahitya Akademi Award for the same novel. In 1990, she was awarded the prestigious Bharatiya Bhasha Parishad award. In 1996, she received the Raja-Lakshmi Award. She also received the Telugu University award. In 2005, Sri Padmavati Mahila Visvavidyalayam awarded her with an honorary doctorate and title of Kalaprapoorna. In 2005, Chendur and her husband has received the first Lok Nayak Foundation award instituted by Yarlagadda Lakshmiprasad.

== Death ==
She died following a prolonged illness on 21 August 2013 in Chennai. Her body was donated to Sri Ramachandra Medical College and Research Institute for research purposes.
