= Filippo Strofaldi =

Italian Roman Catholic bishop

Filippo Strofaldi (14 August 1940 − 24 August 2013) was an Italian Catholic bishop.

Ordained to the priesthood in 1964, Strofalda was named bishop of the Roman Catholic Diocese of Ischia, Italy in 1997 and resigned in 2012.
