= Peter Calder =

British mechanical engineer (1926–2013)

Peter Henry Calder OBE FREng (25 February 1926 - 31 August 2013) was a British mechanical engineer; he was head of the development of the engine programme for Concorde.

== Early life ==
He was born in Switzerland. He attended Imperial College London.

== Career ==
=== De Havilland Engines ===
He worked for the de Havilland Engine Company, working at their Gas Dynamics Laboratory in Hertfordshire.

=== Rolls-Royce ===
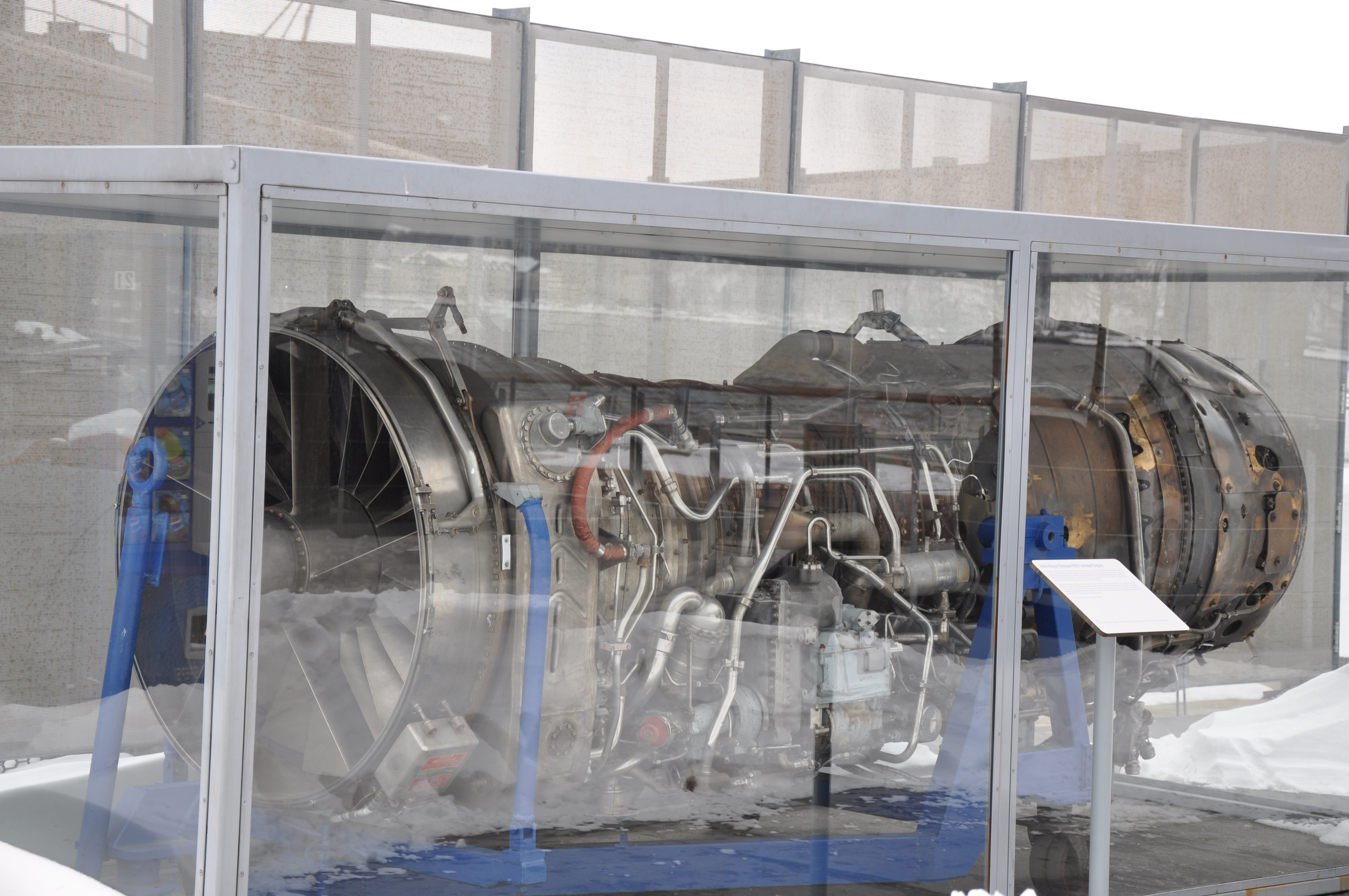
Olympus 593 engine; Concorde's engines had to operate with subsonic airflow, known as supercruise

Bristol-Siddeley had been formed on 1 February 1959, when Bristol Aero-Engines Ltd merged. On 1 April 1962, Bristol Siddeley took the assets of De Havilland Engine Company Ltd. Rolls-Royce in the 1950s or early 1960s had not, by contrast, similarly acquired smaller companies.

In the late 1970s he was Project Director for the Rolls-Royce RB.2211-22B.

=== Concorde ===
By 1965 he was assistant chief engineer of the Olympus 593 project, later becoming chief engineer. He was technical director of Rolls-Royce at Filton (Bristol Siddeley until 1968), when the engines (Rolls-Royce/Snecma Olympus 593 twin-spool turbojet) for the BAC Concorde were being developed. Brian Calvert was Concorde's flight manager, with whom he worked closely.

== Personal life ==
He was awarded the OBE in the 1976 New Year Honours. He married Mary, who died on 29 December 2015. He lived in Portishead, North Somerset. He died 31 August 2013 after a long illness aged 87.

Business positions
Preceded by	Technical Director of Rolls-Royce (Filton)	Succeeded by
Professional and academic associations
Preceded by John Stollery	President of the Royal Aeronautical Society; 1988-1989	Succeeded by Geoff Howell
