= Robert Lebron =

Robert Lebron (March 13, 1928 - August 31, 2013) was an American impressionist artist. He was born in New York City, where he attended the High School of Music and Arts. He also went on to study at the Art Students League for five years. Lebron developed his own personal technique after several extensive stays in Europe, relying on the use of a palette knife rather than brushes.

Lebron has painted in Europe, particularly London and Paris, in Italy and Spain, in Canada and Mexico. He won such awards as the Forbes Magazine Award (travel grant), and he has had one-man shows at the Galeria Studio in Madrid and in New Jersey, Connecticut, Illinois and in his home city ( NYC).

Most of his paintings feature favorite characters from his childhood including a tiny dog present in most of his paintings, inspired by the comic strip Dickie Dare.

His paintings of the Donner Party are exhibited at the Emigrant Trail Museum at Donner Memorial State Park in Truckee, California. The series of four paintings deals with the struggles of the infamous Donner Party and were commissioned and donated to the museum by Dan Johnson, a Donner Party historian. These paintings were also featured on the History Channel's "Snowbound in the Sierras".

One of his paintings of Wall Street was used as part of an answer in the Feb. 19, 2013 episode of the game show Jeopardy!

In 2012, Lebron published a fictional novel entitled "The Da Vinci-Picasso Dialogue".
