= Bo Bing (academic) =

- 薄冰
- Born: 1921; Ying County, Shanxi, Republic of China
- Died: August 17, 2013 (aged 91); Beijing, China

Academic background
- Education: National Chekiang University

Academic work
- Discipline: English grammar
- Institutions: Beijing Foreign Studies University

Bo Bing (Chinese: 薄冰; pinyin: Bó Bīng; born 1921 in Ying County, Shanxi, China; died August 17, 2013, in Beijing) was a Chinese English grammar academic and a professor at the Beijing Foreign Studies University. Bo was best known for his series of textbooks on English grammar for English learners.

== Career ==
Bo graduated from the department of foreign languages at the then-National Chekiang University in 1947. He started his English teaching career at Shanghai Occupational School, teaching until 1949, when he returned to his studies at the North China Evolution University until 1950. He joined the English department at the Beijing Foreign Language Institute in 1950, and remained with the institute till his death.

Bo enjoyed a special allowance from the State Council from 1992.

In 1998, Kaiming Press published Bo Bing English Grammar, the first of his series of textbooks on English grammar. Due to unauthorized distribution of these books, Bo sued a number of publishers.

== Death ==
Bo died in Beijing on August 17, 2013, due to respiratory failure.
