= Thomas McAnea =

Scottish master counterfeiter and forger

- Born: c.1950 Glasgow, Scotland
- Died: 2 August 2013 (aged 63); Glasgow
- Resting place: Anniesland, Glasgow
- Other name: Hologram Tam
- Occupation: Printer
- Status: Released; deceased
- Criminal charges: Forgery; Counterfeiting English banknotes; Counterfeiting Scottish banknotes; Counterfeiting Danish banknotes; Controlling forgery equipment; Theft of printing presses; Delivering, selling or disposing of counterfeit Scottish banknotes; Delivering, selling or disposing of counterfeit Euro notes
- Penalty: 1997: 10 years (quashed on appeal); 2007: 6 years 4 months

Thomas Charles McAnea (c.1950 – 2 August 2013), also known as Hologram Tam, was a Scottish master counterfeiter, regarded as one of the most skillful in Europe with regard to banknote security holograms.

McAnea was sentenced to 10 years imprisonment for counterfeiting in 1998—only to be famously released on appeal due to a "typo" on the police search warrant that had initially led to his arrest. In 2007, he was convicted of 'delivering, selling or disposing of' fake Bank of Scotland and Euro notes and sentenced to 6 years and 4 months imprisonment.

== Early career ==
Prior to embarking upon his criminal career, McAnea had been a print union official and operated his own printing business. Following the deaths of his two sons, he began to drink heavily, running up debts and bankrupting the business. To "make ends meet", he instead offered his skills to organised crime gangs in Glasgow. A spokesperson for the Scottish Crime and Drug Enforcement Agency (SCDEA) said: "He knew everything there was to know about holograms, watermarks, what types of paper to use and how the end result should look and feel. Organised crime groups who wanted fake notes knew the only person who they could virtually guarantee would do a job for them was Tam."

== Operation Wembley ==
McAnea was first apprehended on 8 June 1996, during a police raid on premises in Beith Street, Partick, Glasgow, where printing plates for Bank of England £20 notes and Clydesdale Bank £5 notes were found. Released on bail, McAnea and his accomplices were then placed under covert surveillance which led police to a second printing operation in Cotton Street, Dalmarnock, Glasgow. When this was raided, police discovered the gang had switched to producing counterfeit Danish 500 kroner notes. The men were also producing counterfeit postage stamps, television licence stamps, MOT certificates and duty-free vouchers.

=== Trial ===
During the subsequent trial, held between 27 January—17 March 1998, Advocate Depute Frank Mulholland said that the scale of the operation was such that it represented a "threat to the economic well-being of this country and Denmark." On 17 March 1998, McAnea was convicted of counterfeiting £20 notes, Clydesdale Bank £5 notes, controlling forgery equipment, stealing printing presses, forging Danish currency, forging duty free vouchers and forging MoT test certificates. He was sentenced to 10 years imprisonment. Lord Cameron, sentencing, said: "You will be well aware that counterfeiting currency notes has the potential to destroy confidence in the lawful issued currency... It is a crime which strikes at the root of the commercial and economic life of a country."

=== Appeal ===
On the first day of the trial, during the testimony of the first witness called by the prosecution, McAnea's Advocate Herbert Kerrigan objected that the search warrants used by Strathclyde Police to enter the Beith Street premises and seize evidence were invalid as they all referred to a non-existent "1989 Forgery and Counterfeiting Act"—the act is instead the "1981 Forgery and Counterfeiting Act." The initial typing error had been transcribed to other documents—including 15 search warrants—prepared by the police in connection with the raid, and had been overlooked by 10 detectives and 5 Justices of the Peace.

Kerrigan argued that warrants were intended to protect citizens' rights and the error rendered them unlawful—just days earlier, 2 other major trials had been abandoned because of errors on search warrants. Lord Cameron initially agreed with the defence that the warrants were invalid, but, the following day, the Advocate Depute made a submission that it was merely a typographical error, that the evidence gathered under them could still be put to the jury, and that a 1950 appeal court decision (Note: Lawrie v Muir (1950 JC 19, 1950 SLT 37, [1949] ScotHC HCJAC 2) allowed the judge to exercise discretion and to excuse the mistake. The trial was adjourned and the jury sent home while Lord Cameron deliberated the matter. Lord Cameron decided that as the error was not due to "deliberate deception" by the police but was instead "more akin to a technical flaw", it could be excused and "the evidence obtained on presentation of the invalid warrants [was] admissible."

Kerrigan immediately raised a challenge in the Appeal Court to Lord Cameron's ruling, where it was decided "that the move was premature and that the men could return with their argument if and when they were convicted." Following their conviction, McAnea and his accomplices—Dennis McGinnis, John McGregor and Raymond Dean—lodged appeals based on the invalid warrants. In October 1998, all 4 were granted "interim liberation" and released from prison pending the outcome of the appeal.

The appeal was heard by Lord Justice General Lord Rodger, Lord Prosser and Lord Allanbridge on 18 July 2000 at the Court of Criminal Appeal in Edinburgh. The men argued that there had been a miscarriage of justice because once Lord Cameron had ruled that the warrants were invalid, any subsequent decision to reverse his position and admit evidence gathered illegally was incompetent. On 2 August 2000, the appellate court handed down its decision in favour of the men and quashed the convictions. Lord Rodger said: "We are satisfied that it was incompetent for the trial judge to give effect to the supplementary submissions of the advocate depute and to reverse his decision to uphold the defence objection." The appellate court's opinion was that once a decision on a defence objection had been taken and stated in open court, it was final and could not be reconsidered. Had the prosecution submitted their argument at the time, before the objection was sustained, instead of waiting until the following day, the evidence may still have been admissible. Crucially, the prosecution were aware that the search warrants contained the erroneous date—and that the defence intended to object their validity—at least as early as the day before the trial commenced. Lord Rodger added: "If decisions formally announced by a trial judge in open court could immediately be re-opened by any losing counsel who could dream up a further argument, the potential for delay, uncertainty and even abuse is obvious."

== Death ==
McAnea died in August 2013 due to lung cancer caused by many years of exposure to print and solvent fumes.
