= Julio Marigil =

Spanish footballer

Marigil
Personal information
- Full name: Julio Marigil Merino
- Date of birth: 24 August 1936
- Place of birth: Bilbao, Spain
- Date of death: 24 August 2013 (aged 77)
- Place of death: Oviedo, Spain
- Position: Defender

Youth career
- CD Txistu
- Euskalduna Andoaín

Senior career*
Years	Team	Apps	(Gls)
1955–1957	Logroñés	36	(0)
1957–1969	Oviedo	253	(0)

International career
1960	Spain U21	1	(0)

Managerial career
- 1970–1971: Vetusta
- 1970: Oviedo (interim)
- 1974–1975: Atlético Universitario
- 1976–1978: Ensidesa
- 1978–1980: Caudal
- 1980–1985: Vetusta
- 1985–2002: Oviedo (assistant)
- 1993: Oviedo (interim)
- * Club domestic league appearances and goals

Julio Marigil Merino (24 October 1936 – 24 August 2013), also known as Marigil, was a Spanish footballer who played as a defender.

== Club career ==
Julio Marigil Merino was born in Bilbao. The fact that Marigil came to life in that city was a mere anecdote as he spend his childhood years in Lasarte (Gipuzkoa), his parents’ hometown. In its fields and at the local school, he started playing football.

At 19 he signed for CD Logroñés, where he played from 1955 to 1957. In spite of the fact that they were relegated to the Third tier of Spanish football in that year, his performances really convinced Real Oviedo scouts so they got him to join the Blues in May 1957. He went on to become a safe bet for Real Oviedo, both as a person and as a player from the day he made his debut on 15 September 1957 when Los Carbayones got an away draw to CD Condal Barcelona at Las Corts. Real Oviedo coach, Abel Picabea, lined up the following starting XI: Caldentey, Luis Sport, Alarcón, Marigil; Sánchez, Ferrer; Mario Durán, Xirau, Aloy, Lalo and Chus Herrera. His first season at the club could not have been more successful: Real Oviedo got promoted to La Liga and his following seven seasons as a Blue were linked to the Spanish footballing elite. In between, on 4 May 1960, Marigil played for the Spanish national reserves team. In 1965 Real Oviedo were relegated from the first tier of Spanish football, but Marigil still played for the club for the next four seasons. He retired from football at 32 owing to a slight heart-related problem. His last official match was played against Real Murcia at Carlos Tartiere Stadium on 19 January 1969 with the result of a goalless draw at final time. Notwithstanding this, his tachycardia did not keep him away from the football pitch as he went on to become a manager.

== Managerial career ==
He coached SD Vetusta, AD Universidad de Oviedo, Caudal Deportivo, CD Ensidesa and, later on, Real Oviedo as an assistant manager.

== Personal ==
His sons Enrique "Quique" and Ignacio "Iñaki" Marigil Echevarría are former football players.
