= Huw Jenkins (cricketer) =

Welsh cricketer

Huw Jenkins (24 October 1944 – 21 August 2013) was a Welsh cricketer active in 1970 who played for Glamorgan. He was born in Swansea and died in Clevedon. He appeared in one first-class match as a lefthanded batsman who bowled right arm medium pace. He scored 81 runs with a highest score of 65.
