= Thomas Crowley (American politician) =

American politician

Thomas M. Crowley (September 30, 1935 – August 17, 2013) was an American businessman and legislator.

Born in Burlington, Vermont, Crowley served in the Air National Guard for eight years. He then graduated from Saint Michael's College. He owned and operated Crowley Insurance Agency with his family. He also was in the automobile business. He served in the Vermont State Senate from 1967 until 1991 as a Democrat. In 1997, he was appointed assistant judge for Chittenden County, Vermont. He died in Burlington, Vermont.
