= Alberto Marsicano =

Brazilian musician, writer, philosopher, and professor

- Born: 31 January 1952
- Died: 18 August 2013 (aged 61)
- Occupation: Educator
- Instrument: Sitar

Alberto Marsicano (31 January 1952 – 18 August 2013) was a Brazilian musician, translator, writer, philosopher and professor. He was one of the people who introduced the Indian sitar in Brazil. He played with musicians such as Ivan Vilela, Lula Côrtes and Arnaldo Antunes.

Marsicano spoke many languages, including Chinese, Latin, English, and Greek. He had a degree in philosophy.

He studied with Ravi Shankar in London, and Krishna Chakavarty, a professor at the University of Benares.

== Discography ==
- Impressionismos (1995)
- Raga Do Cerrado (2001)
- Quintissencia (2002)
- Eter (Edson X-Mix) (2003)
- Electric Sitar (2003)
