= Peter Needham (cricketer) =

South African cricketer (1932–2013)

Personal information
- Born: 17 July 1932; Johannesburg, South Africa
- Died: 23 August 2013 (aged 81)
- Source: ESPNcricinfo, 31 May 2016

Peter Needham (17 July 1932 – 23 August 2013) was a South African cricketer. He played six first-class matches for Transvaal between 1950 and 1961.
