= Rose Morat =

American centenarian crime victim (1906–2013)

Coordinates: 40°42′49″N 73°47′16″W

Location of Morat's residence in New York City

Rose M. Morat (February 4, 1906 – August 3, 2013) was a New York City resident and retired telecommunications worker. On the afternoon of March 4, 2007, at the age of 101, she was assaulted and mugged in the lobby of her building on the way to church. A grainy video captured the assault, during which the alleged attacker, Jack Rhodes, 44, struck her several times in the face. The video incited outrage among New Yorkers. A substantial reward was offered by several sources, including the police, for information leading to the capture of the suspect. The attack occurred at 172-90 Highland Avenue in Jamaica Estates, Queens.

As a result of Morat's assault, New York State Senator Martin Golden has introduced a bill that would make it a felony to assault anyone over 70 years old. The bill would increase the legal penalty to seven years if the victim were injured during the assault. Currently, [2019] assault is a misdemeanor punishable by up to one year in jail. The bill has found support from such public figures as Senator Hillary Clinton and New York City Mayor Michael Bloomberg.

On December 2, 2009, Jack Rhodes, 47, was sentenced to 75 years ("one for each dollar he stole from Morat") in prison at the Clinton Correctional Facility in Dannemora, New York. Morat died on August 3, 2013, at the age of 107.

== Sources ==
- CNN: Hard-bitten New Yorkers want mugger's head
- New York Press: Reward For Old Lady-Basher
- Cops: Find This Sad Excuse For A Human Being
