= Connect (organization) =

US non-profit organization

Connect is a non-profit serving the San Diego and Southern California region. Connect elevates innovators and entrepreneurs throughout their growth journey by providing educational programming, mentorship, networking events, and access to capital. The current CEO is James Zanewicz.

== Background ==
Founded at the University of California, San Diego (UC San Diego), Connect spun out of the university in 2005. Connect was founded in 1985 by Irwin M. Jacobs, co-founder and board member of Qualcomm Incorporated; Richard Atkinson, president emeritus, University of California (and former chancellor, UC San Diego); Lea Rudee, founding dean, UC San Diego School of Engineering; Mary Lindenstein Walshok, associate vice chancellor of extended studies and public programs at UC San Diego; Buzz Woolley, president of Girard Capital/Girard Foundation; David Hale, chairman of Hale BioPharma Ventures LLC; Dan Pegg, former president and CEO of San Diego Regional Economic Development Corporation; and Bob Weaver of Deloitte & Touche.

In 1986 UC San Diego recruited William 'Bill' Otterson, chairman and CEO of Cipher Data Products, to lead Connect. Over the following 13 years, Otterson expanded Connect by bringing together local entrepreneurs, academics, and out-of-area venture capitalists through a range of innovation-focused programs. has since become an internationally recognized organization, with its model replicated in almost 40 regions worldwide, including New York City, the UK, Denmark, Finland, Sweden, and Australia.

In May 2019, Connect merged with San Diego Venture Group (SDVG), led by then SDVG President, Mike Krenn.

== Programs ==
Connect offers programs in the areas of research institution support, access to capital, entrepreneur mentorship, business development, and education on capital structure. Connect's lead program is Springboard, which offers free hands-on mentoring by veterans for innovators at the innovation, technology transfer, commercialization, transition and international expansion stages. Springboard has been recognized as a model by the New York Times, and Entrepreneur Magazine.

== Founder credentials ==
In 2005 CONNECT was a co-founder of the Wireless Life Sciences Alliance, in 2008 CONNECT founded CleanTECH San Diego, and in 2009 founded San Diego Sport Innovators, now headed by Bill Walton.

San Diego Sport Innovators was created in 2008 by Camille Sobrian and Marco Thompson by partnering with sponsor Dick Kintz from Shepard Mulin law firm. Sports industry veterans, Peter "PT" Townsend, Ludo Boinnard and Jim Stroesser were added as the founding boarding members. Other board members include: Dana Shertz, Michael Brower, Bob Rief, Tony Finn, Mark Schmid, John Sarkisian, Brian Enge, Dave Nash, John Wilson, Dave Down, Jeff Kearl, and Kevin Flanagan. Former NBA great, Bill Walton, was brought in as the chairman in 2009.

== Awards ==
The highest award CONNECT gives entrepreneurs is the Entrepreneur Hall of Fame Award. This award is given to those Connect deems community leaders through influence in life science and technology based businesses in San Diego. These businesses are viewed by Connect as significant contributions to San Diego's economy and quality of life, relying on the "Hall of Fame" entrepreneurs for their success.

Those given the award include: Irwin Jacobs, co-founder, board member and former chairman and CEO, Qualcomm Incorporated; Walter Zable, co-founder, chairman and CEO of Cubic Corporation; Robert Beyster, founder and former chairman and CEO of SAIC and chairman of The Foundation for Enterprise Development; Ivor Royston, co-founder of Hybritech (San Diego's first biotechnology company) and managing member of Forward Ventures; William Rastetter, former president and CEO of IDEC Pharmaceuticals (merged with Biogen to become Biogen Idec, the third largest biotechnology company in the world); and Neal Blue, chairman and CEO of General Atomics (GA), Linden Blue, vice chairman of GA and chairman of Spectrum Aeronautical, and Peter Preuss, founder of ISSCO.
