= Maung Wuntha =

Burmese journalist and author

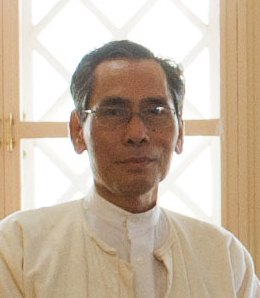
- Born: 17 April 1945; Myit Kyo Village, Waw Township, Bago Division, Burma
- Died: 11 August 2013 (aged 68); Yangon, Yangon Region, Burma
- Education: Parliament Member (1990), Myanmar Journalist Association
- Occupations: Writer; journalist
- Spouse: Myint Myint
- Children: Naung Naung Soe
- Writing career
- Notable awards: National Endowment for Humanities (NEH)(1977)

Maung Wuntha (Burmese: မောင်ဝံသ; 17 April 1945 – 11 August 2013), also known as Soe Thein, was a veteran Myanmar journalist and a prominent author. He worked as an editor at several newspapers published by the government before 1988.

He was one of the appointed member of the central executive committee of the National League for Democracy when it was registered in 1989. He was arrested three times for his involvement in the democracy movement and the NLD.

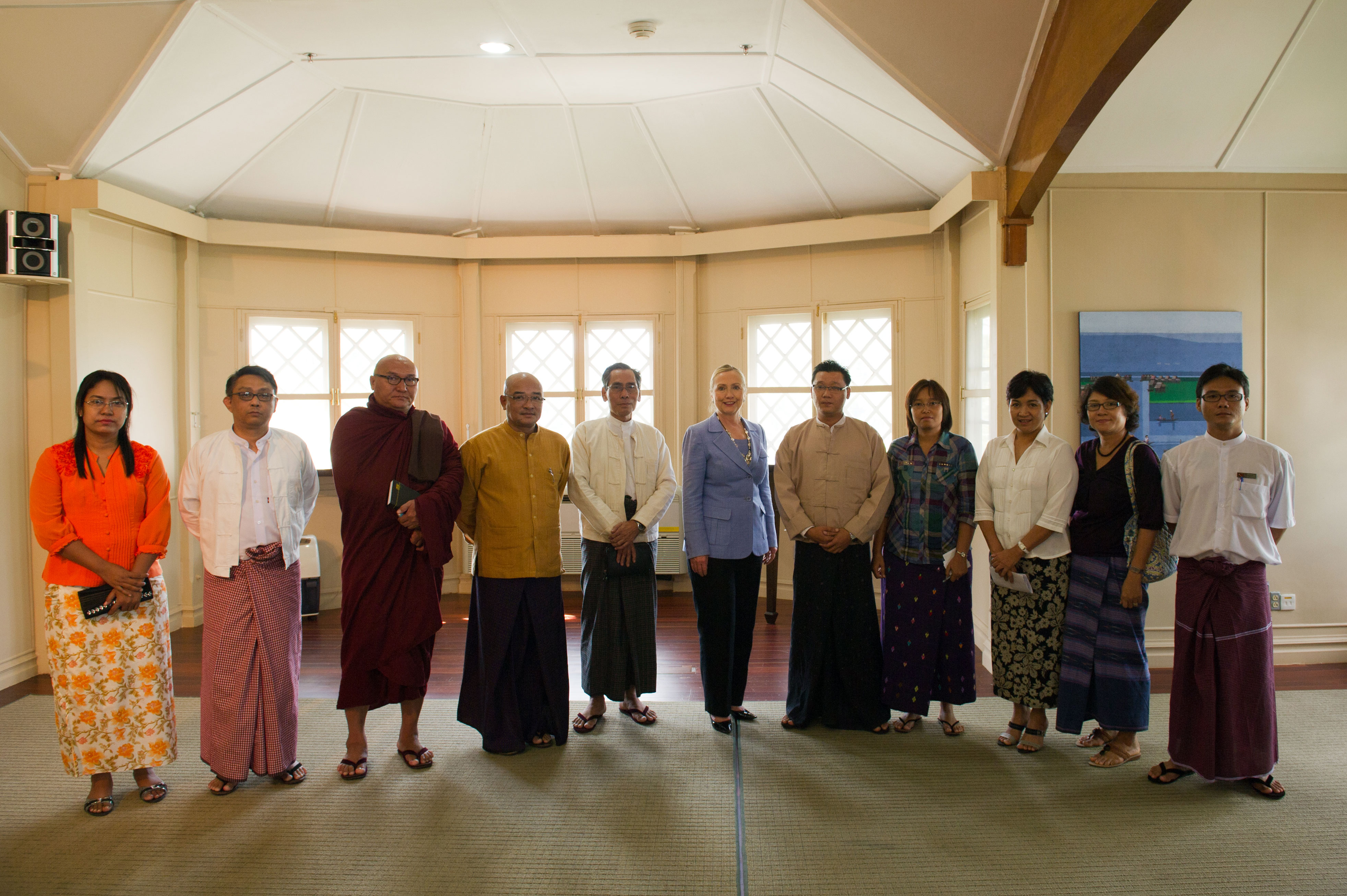
In December 2011, US Secretary of State Hillary Clinton met with Maung Wuntha, along with other civil society representatives. (Clicking on a person's face will take you to an article about the person.)

He was elected chairman of the Myanmar Journalists Association in August 2012 and vice chairman of the Interim Press Council the following month. He took a leading role in fighting for press freedom in Burma. He criticized the government for its policy on political prisoners and press freedom.

He set up Dawn (Peacock) Publishing House in 1973 and wrote over 60 books and papers. Some of the books he translated are biographies on US Secretary of State Henry Kissinger, Israeli military leader Moshe Dayan and Egyptian President Anwar Sadat.

He died on 11 August 2013 at Yangon after battling lung cancer for more than a year. He was survived by his wife Myint Myint, four children and two grandchildren.
