= Diocese of Bùi Chu =

Diocese in Vietnam

Coordinates: 20.3077°N 106.3300°E

Diocese of Bùi Chu Dioecesis Buichuensis Giáo phận Bùi Chu

Catholic
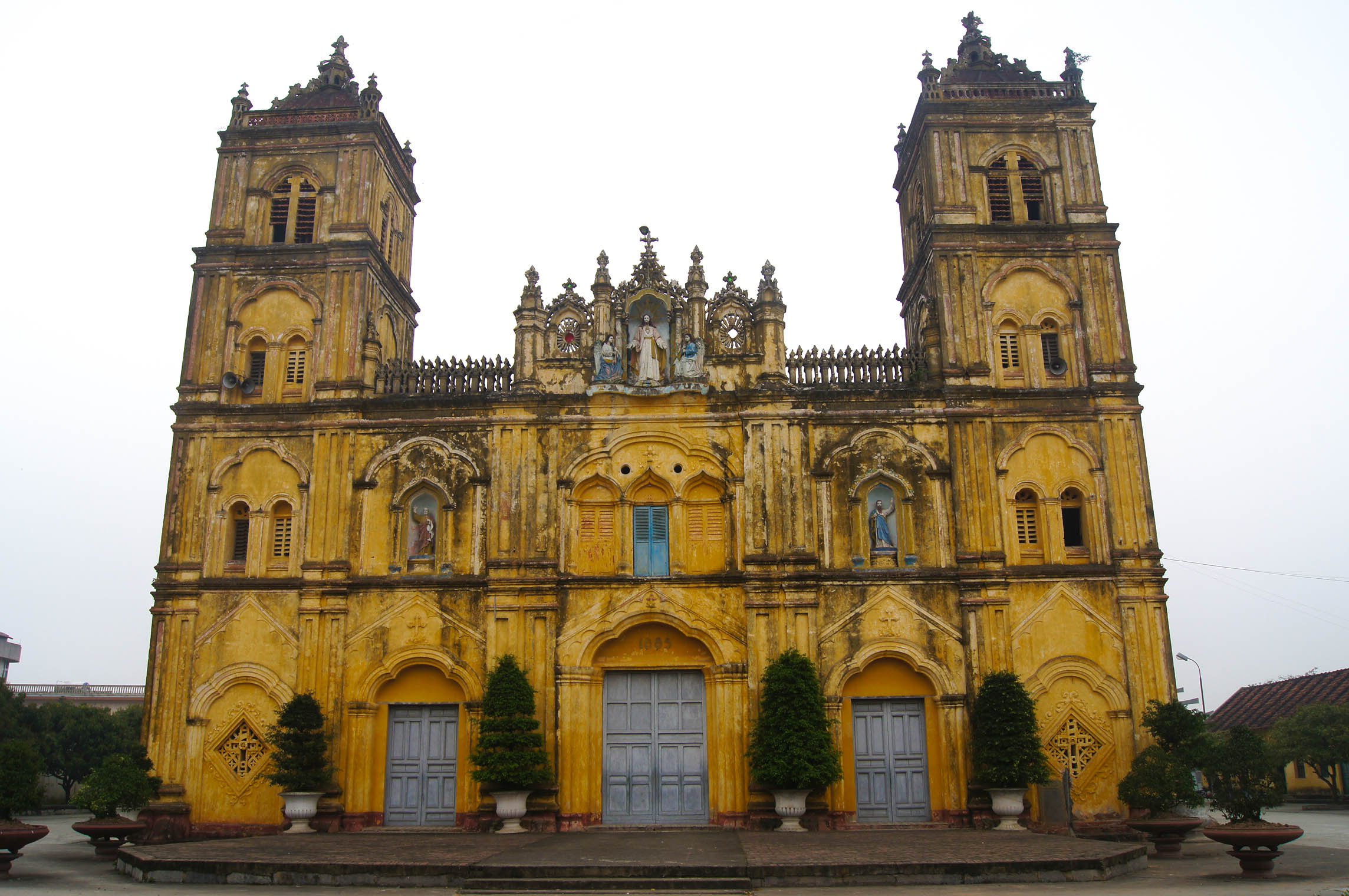
- Bùi Chu Cathedral (2011)

- Coat of arms of Bishop Thomas Aquinas Vũ Đình Hiệu

Location
- Country: Vietnam
- Ecclesiastical province: Hà Nội

Statistics
- Area: 1,350 km^{2} (520 sq mi)
- Population: Total; Catholics: (as of 2021); 1,296,363; 430,937 (33.2%)
- Parishes: 233

Information
- Denomination: Roman Catholic
- Sui iuris church: Latin Church
- Rite: Roman Rite
- Established: 5 September 1848; 175 years ago as Apostolic Vicariate; 24 November 1960; 63 years ago as Diocese
- Cathedral: Cathedral of the Queen of the Most Holy Rosary
- Patron saint: Our Lady of the Immaculate Conception

Current leadership
- Pope: Leo XIV
- Bishop: Thomas Aquinas Vũ Đình Hiệu
- Metropolitan Archbishop: Joseph Vũ Văn Thiên

Website
- https://gpbuichu.org/

The diocese of Bùi Chu (Latin: Dioecesis Buichuensis) is a Roman Catholic diocese of Vietnam. It encompasses 4/5 of Nam Định Province in terms of area, including the six districts of Xuân Trường, Giao Thủy, Hải Hậu, Nghĩa Hưng, Trực Ninh, and Nam Trực and part of Nam Định city. The current bishop of the diocese since August 2013 is Thomas Aquinas Vũ Đình Hiệu.

== Overview ==
Bùi Chu Diocese covers an area of 1,350 km^{2}, and is a suffragan diocese of the Archdiocese of Hanoi.

From the late 17th century until 1930s, this was a center of the Spanish Dominican mission in Vietnam. The covering area of Bùi Chu is the same as at present as it has been from 1936, when it still was an apostolic vicariate. It was declared a diocese on November 24, 1960.

By 2018, the Diocese of Bùi Chu had about 409,000 believers (32.8% of the population) in 176 parishes.

The diocese is divided into 13 deaneries: Báo Đáp, Bùi Chu, Đại Đồng, Kiên Chính, Lạc Đạo, Liễu Đề, Ninh Cường, Phú Nhai, Quần Phương, Quỹ Nhất, Thức Hóa, Tứ Trùng, and Tương Nam.

== Ordinaries ==
=== Vicar Apostolic of Central Tonking (1847-1924) ===
Vicar apostolic		Period in office	Status	Reference
1	Bishop Domingo Martí, O.P.	May 18, 1847 – August 26, 1852	Died in office	
2	Bishop José María Díaz Sanjurjo, O.P.	August 26, 1852 – July 20, 1857	Died in office, Martyred.	
3	Bishop José Melchór García-Sampedro Suárez, O.P.	July 20, 1857 – July 28, 1858	Died in office, Martyred.	
4	Bishop Valentín Faustino Berrio-Ochoa de Aristi, O.P.	July 28, 1858 – November 01, 1861	Died in office, Martyred.	
5	Bishop Bernabé García Cezón, O.P.	September 09, 1864 – November, 1879	Resigned	
6	Bishop Manuel Ignacio Riaño	November, 1879 – November 26, 1884	Died in office	
7	Bishop Wenceslao Oñate, O.P.	November 26, 1884 – June 23, 1897	Died in office	
8	Bishop Máximo Fernández, O.P.	February 12, 1898 – August 14, 1907	Resigned	
9	Bishop Pedro Muñagorri y Obineta, O.P.	August 14, 1907 – December 23, 1924	Remained as vicar apostolic of Bui Chu.	

=== Vicar Apostolic of Bùi Chu (1924-1960) ===
Vicar apostolic		Period in office	Status	Reference
9	Bishop Pedro Muñagorri y Obineta, O.P.	December 03, 1924 – June 17, 1936	Died in office	
10	Bishop Domingo Hồ Ngọc Cẩn	June 17, 1936 – November 27, 1948	Died in office	
–	Bishop Thaddeus Lê Hữu Từ, O. Cist.	1948 – February 03, 1950	Apostolic Administrator	
11	Bishop Pierre-Marie Phạm Ngọc Chi	February 03, 1950 – March 05, 1960	Transferred to Quy Nhon	
–	Fr. Joseph-Marie Phạm Năng Tĩnh	1959 – March 05, 1960	Apostolic Administrator	
12	Bishop Joseph-Marie Phạm Năng Tĩnh	March 05, 1960 – November 24, 1960	Remained as bishop of Bui Chu	

=== Bishop of Bùi Chu (1960-present) ===
Bishop		Coat of Arms	Period in office	Status	Reference
1	Bishop Joseph-Marie Phạm Năng Tĩnh		November 24, 1960 – February 11, 1974	Died in office	
2	Bishop Dominique-Marie Lê Hữu Cung		April 28, 1975 – March 12, 1987	Died in office	
3	Bishop Joseph Vũ Duy Nhất		March 12, 1987 – December 11, 1999	Died in office	
4	Bishop Joseph Hoàng Văn Tiệm, S.D.B.		July 04, 2001 – August 17, 2013	Died in office	
5	Bishop Thomas Vũ Đình Hiệu		August 17, 2013 – present	Current bishop	

Coadjutor Vicar Apostolic of Central Tonking (1848-1884)

Coadjutor Vicar Apostolic		Period in office	Reference
1	Bishop José María Díaz Sanjurjo, O.P.	September 05, 1848 – August 26, 1852	
2	Bishop José Melchór García-Sampedro Suárez, O.P.	April 15, 1853 – July 20, 1857	
3	Bishop Valentín Faustino Berrio-Ochoa de Aristi, O.P.	December 25, 1857 – July 28, 1858	
4	Bishop Manuel Ignacio Riaño	August 20, 1866 – November, 1879	
5	Bishop Wenceslao Oñate, O.P.	September 18, 1882 – November 26, 1884	

Coadjutor Vicar Apostolic of Bùi Chu (1935-1936)

Coadjutor Vicar Apostolic		Period in office	Reference
1	Bishop Domingo Hồ Ngọc Cẩn	March 11, 1935 – June 17, 1936	

Coadjutor Bishops of Bùi Chu (1979-2013)

Coadjutor Bishops		Coat of Arms	Period in office	Reference
1	Bishop Joseph Vũ Duy Nhất		July 04, 1979 – March 12, 1987	
2	Bishop Thomas Vũ Đình Hiệu		December 24, 2012 – August 17, 2018	

Auxiliary Bishops of Bùi Chu (2005-2009)

		Coat of Arms	Period in office	Reference
1	Bishop Pierre Nguyễn Văn Đệ, S.D.B.		November 29, 2005 – July 25, 2009	

== Sites ==
The Queen of the Holy Rosary Cathedral in Xuân Ngọc Commune, Xuân Trường District, which has been assigned as the see (the location of the cathedral and its Bishop's chair, and thus the headquarters) of the diocese. There are 12 Shrines in the diocese. The Basilica of Immaculate Conception, Phu Nhai is one of them.

There is a traditional charity centre called Nhà Dục Anh (Orphanage House) in the northwest side of the Bùi Chu Cathedral.
