= Lương Thế Vinh =

Vietnamese scholar and mathematician

- Born: 1441; Cao Phương, Liên Bảo, Vụ Bản District, Nam Định Province
- Died: 1496 (aged 54–55); Vụ Bản District, Nam Định Province
- Scientific career
- Fields: Mathematics
- Workplaces: Quốc tử giám of Hanoi

- Personal name
- Vietnamese alphabet: Lương Thế Vinh
- Chữ Hán: 梁世榮

Lương Thế Vinh (1441–1496) was a prominent Vietnamese scholar and mathematician of the fifteenth century.

== Life ==
Lương Thế Vinh was born in the district of Vụ Bản, Nam Định Province, and during the mid-15th century. He obtained doctorate in 1463 or 1478, during the reign of Le Thanh Tong, the golden era of Vietnamese scholarship. He co-worked with Vũ Hựu, another scholar, and introduced Chinese mathematical methods into Vietnam.

== Works ==
Math:

- Great Compendium of Mathematical Methods–Đại thành Toán pháp (edited).
- Khải minh Toán học

Chèo:

- Hý phường phả lục

Buddhism:

- Thiền môn Khoa giáo
- . Advanced methods of Mathematical Calculus
- . “Các phương pháp tính toán nâng cao”
