= Basilica of Immaculate Conception, Phu Nhai =

Phú Nhai Basilica
- Basilica of Immaculate Conception in Phú Nhai
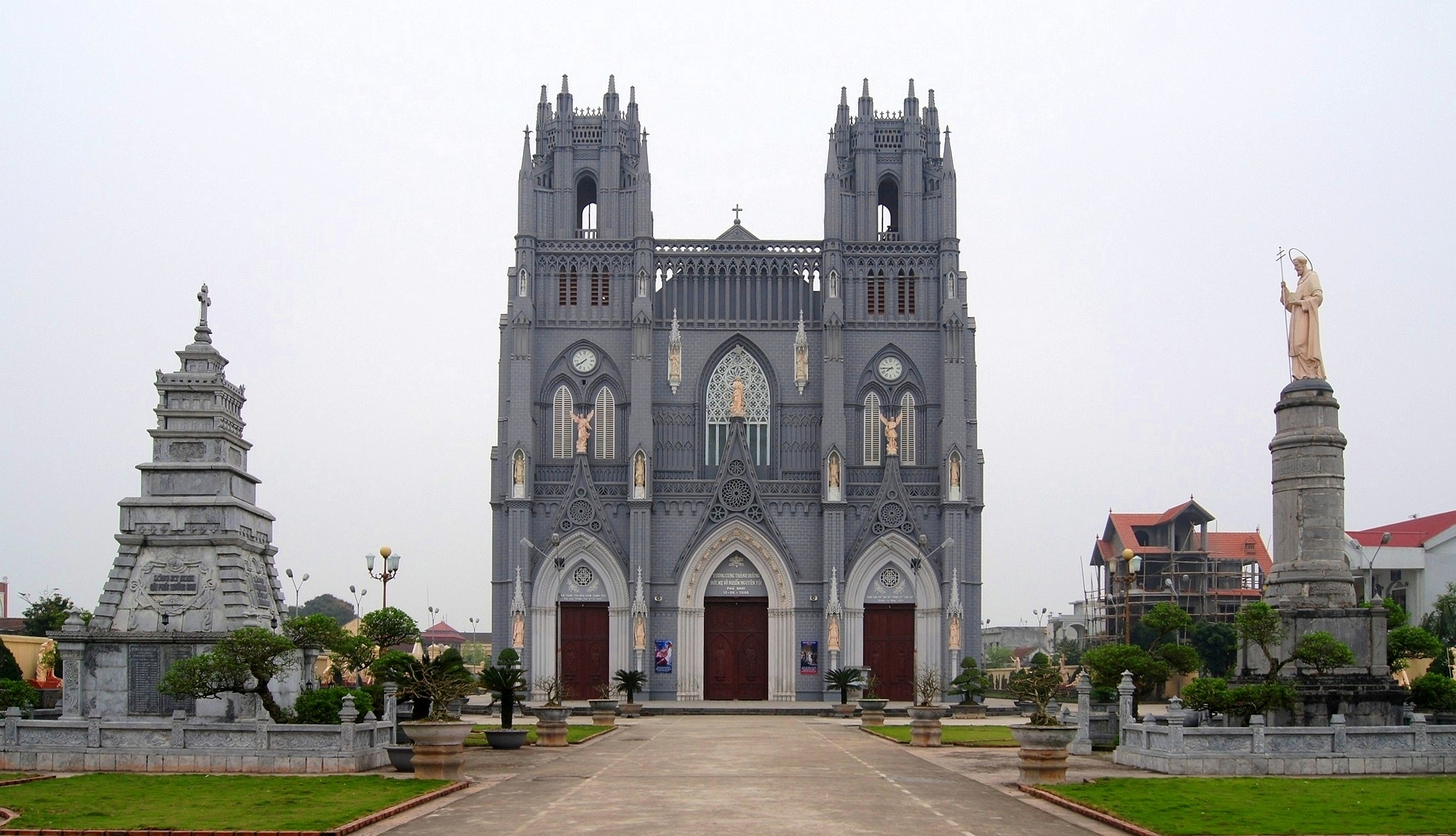
- Phú Nhai Basilica
- 20.3077°N 106.3298°E
- Location: Xuân Trường
- Country: Vietnam
- Denomination: Roman Catholic

History
- Founded: 1866

Architecture
- Style: neo-Gothic
- Completed: 1933

The Basilica of Immaculate Conception in Phu Nhai (Vietnamese: Vương cung thánh đường Phú Nhai) is a neo-Gothic Roman Catholic basilica in Phú Nhai, Xuân Trường, Nam Định, Vietnam. It is dedicated to the Blessed Virgin Mary under its namesake title.

Pope Benedict XVI raised the shrine to the status of Minor Basilica via his decree on 12 August 2008.

== History ==
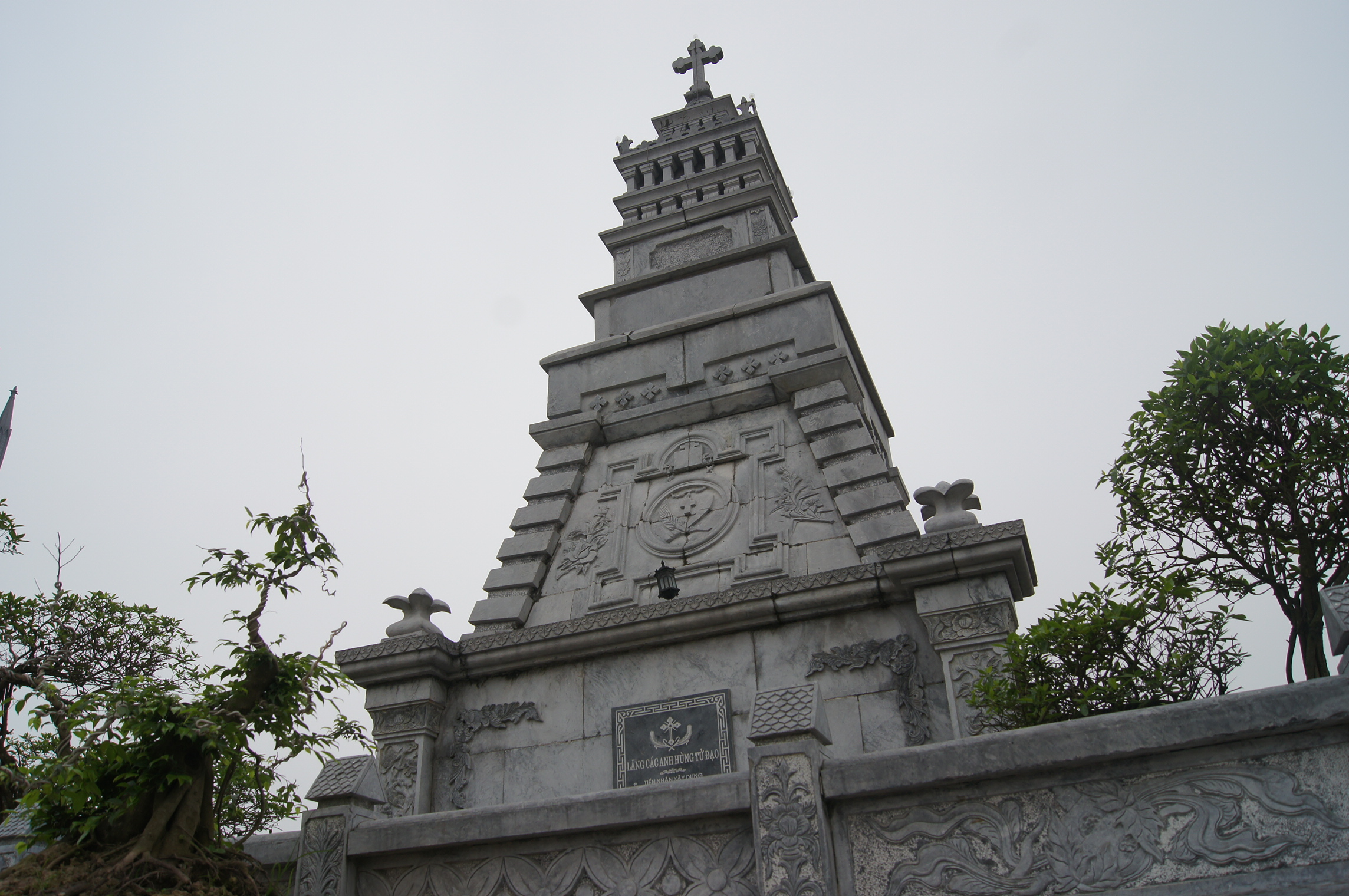
The 83 martyrs' tomb

Phú Nhai, now in the Roman Catholic Diocese of Bùi Chu, was one of major Catholic parishes in Vietnam under the pastoral care of the Spanish Dominican Order. One of the first two bishops of the Vietnamese Catholic church, Pierre Lambert de la Motte was also anointed in the diocese in 1670.

The construction of the church began in 1866 after Emperor Tự Đức signed a treaty with the French promising not to harm the Christian community. The first church was built in 1881. Construction of the second church began in 1916, and was completed in 1923. Major storms devastated the church on June 24, 1929. A nationwide lottery was conducted to fund the construction, and the replacement (third) church was consecrated on the day of the feast of Immaculate Conception on December 8, 1933. During the First Indochina War, the church suffered minor damages, after the French took over the church. Bishop Dominic Nguyen Chu Trinh decided to renovate the church in 2003, and the church in its present state was consecrated on September 26, 2004. In 2008, the church was elevated as a minor basilica by Pope Benedict XVI.

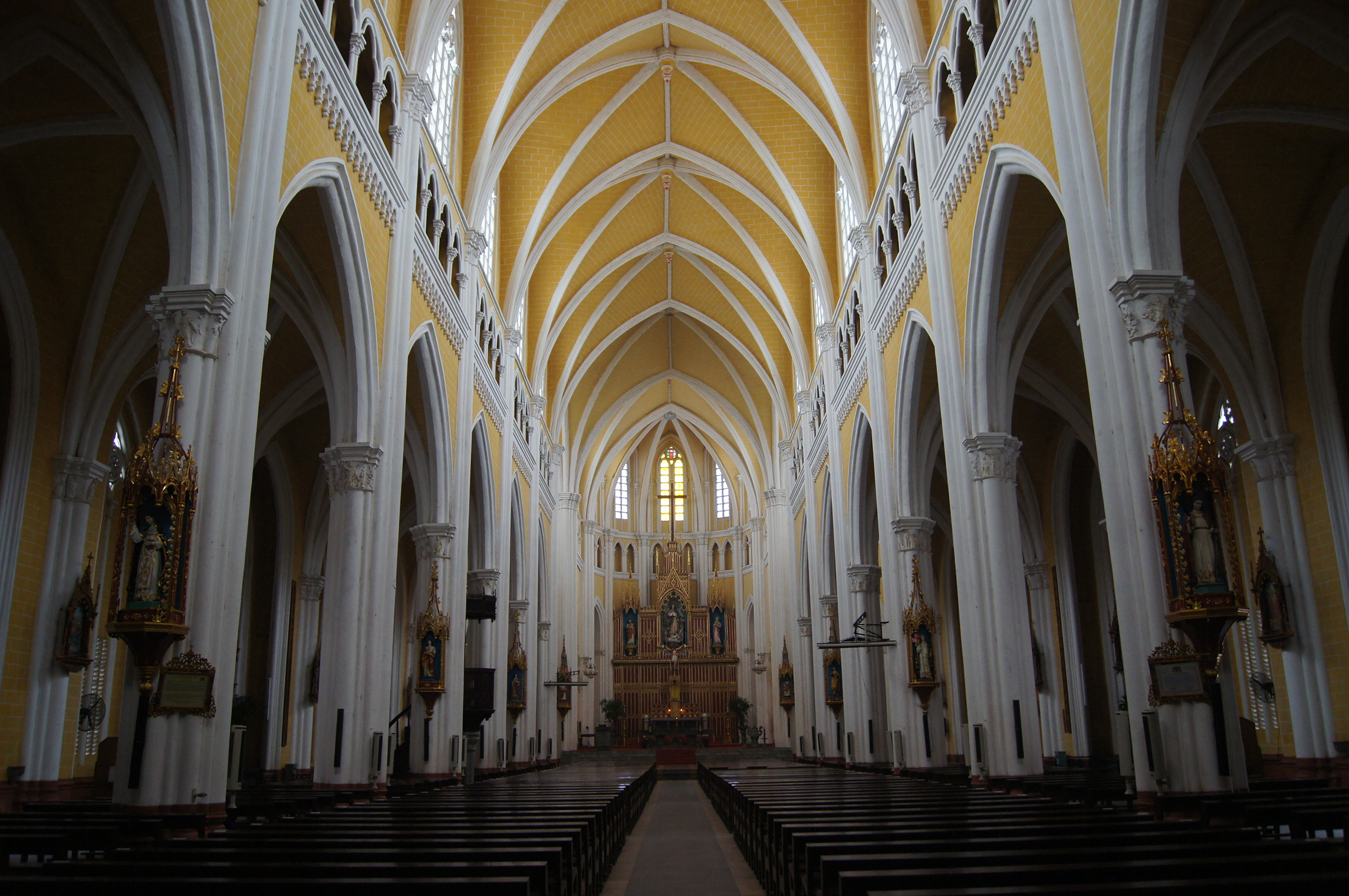
The interior of the basilica

== Architecture ==
The basilica rises to a height of 30 meters and is flanked by two bell towers, each of which are 44 meter long. The bell towers contain 4 bells, each of which weighs two tons.

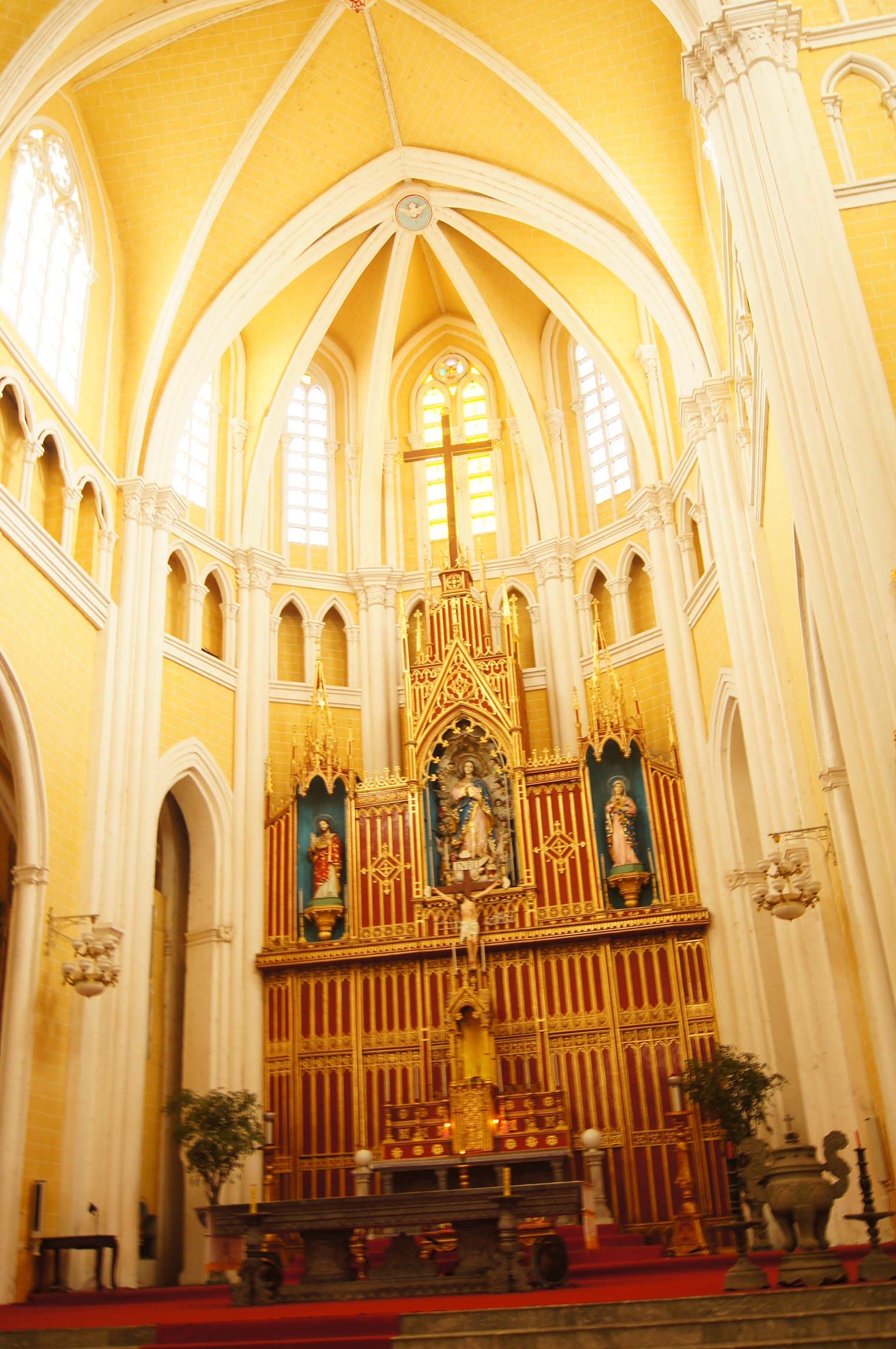
The altar of the basilica

In front of the church, there is a square with two monuments. On the left is a 15-meter-tall tomb for 83 martyrs. On the right is a 17-meter-tall pillar topped by a statue of St. Dominic.
