= Trực Ninh district =

Coordinates: 20.367°N 106.250°E

Trực Ninh district Huyện Trực Ninh Chân Ninh huyện
- Rural District
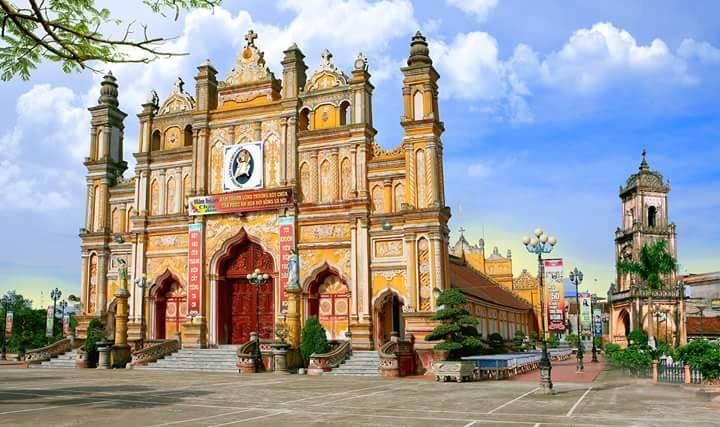
- Trung Lao Church in Trung Đôn commune.
- Country: Vietnam
- Region: Red River Delta
- Province: Nam Định
- Existence: 1833 to August 30, 2025
- Central hall: 87C8+C3V, Thích Thế Long road, Cổ Lễ township

Government
  - Type: Rural district
  - People Committee's Chairman: Phạm Trọng Duy
  - People Council's Chairman: Nguyễn Thanh Tùng
  - Front Committee's Chairman: Mai Văn Chiến
  - Party Committee's Secretary: Phạm Thành Trung

Area
  - Total: 143.95 km^{2} (55.58 sq mi)

Population (2022)
  - Total: 178,103
  - Density: 1,237/km^{2} (3,200/sq mi)
- Time zone: UTC+7 (Indochina Time)
- ZIP code: 07606
- Website: Trucninh.Namdinh.gov.vn; Trucninh.Namdinh.dcs.vn

Trực Ninh [ʨɨ̰ʔk˨˩:nïŋ˧˧] is a former rural district of Nam Định province in the Red River Delta region of Vietnam.

== History ==
=== Middle Ages ===
Since the Sui dynasty, this area belonged to a fairly large administrative unit called Tây Chân rural district (Tây Chân huyện). When the Trần dynasty was founded, Tây Chân belonged to Thiên Trường prefecture. Its name implies that it was the periphery of a small urban complex called Tức Mặc village, where officials and aristocrats were concentrated.

In the Revival Lê dynasty, because its name coincided with the title of Lord Trịnh Tạc, (Note: Tây Định vương Trịnh Tạc, means "the Prince of Parcified West".) it was changed to Nam Chân rural district (Nam Chân huyện).

By the 14th year of Minh Mệnh (1833), Nam Chân rural district was separated into Nam Chân and Chân Ninh. About the year of Tự Đức, Chân Ninh rural district (Chân Ninh huyện) was changed as Xuân Ninh rural district (Xuân Ninh huyện). Since the years of Thành Thái, it was continued to change as Trực Ninh rural district (Trực Ninh huyện). During the Nguyễn dynasty, some parts in the East of this rural district were transferred to Hải Hậu.

=== 20th century ===
On March 26, 1968, according to Decision 41-CP of the Government of the Democratic Republic of Vietnam, the two rural districts of Nam Trực and Trực Ninh re-merged into Nam Ninh rural district (huyện Nam Ninh).

From 1971 to 1996, the number of communes continuously decreased due to the merger.

On February 26, 1997, to implement Decree 19/NĐ-CP of the Government of Vietnam, Nam Ninh rural district was re-divided into two new districts : Nam Trực and Trực Ninh.

=== 21st century ===
To meet the criteria of the plan for arrangement and merger of administrative units, according to the Decision of the Nam Định Provincial People's Committee, which was issued in February 2025, from 00:00 on September 1 of the same year, Trực Ninh Rural District was officially dissolved.

== Geography ==
As of 2003, the district had a population of 196,765. The district covers an area of 143 km^{2}. The district capital lies at Cổ Lễ.

== See also ==
- Giao Thủy district
- Hải Hậu district
- Nghĩa Hưng district
- Vụ Bản district
