= Nghĩa Hưng district =

Coordinates: 20.083°N 106.167°E

Nghĩa Hưng district Huyện Nghĩa Hưng Đại An huyện
- Rural District
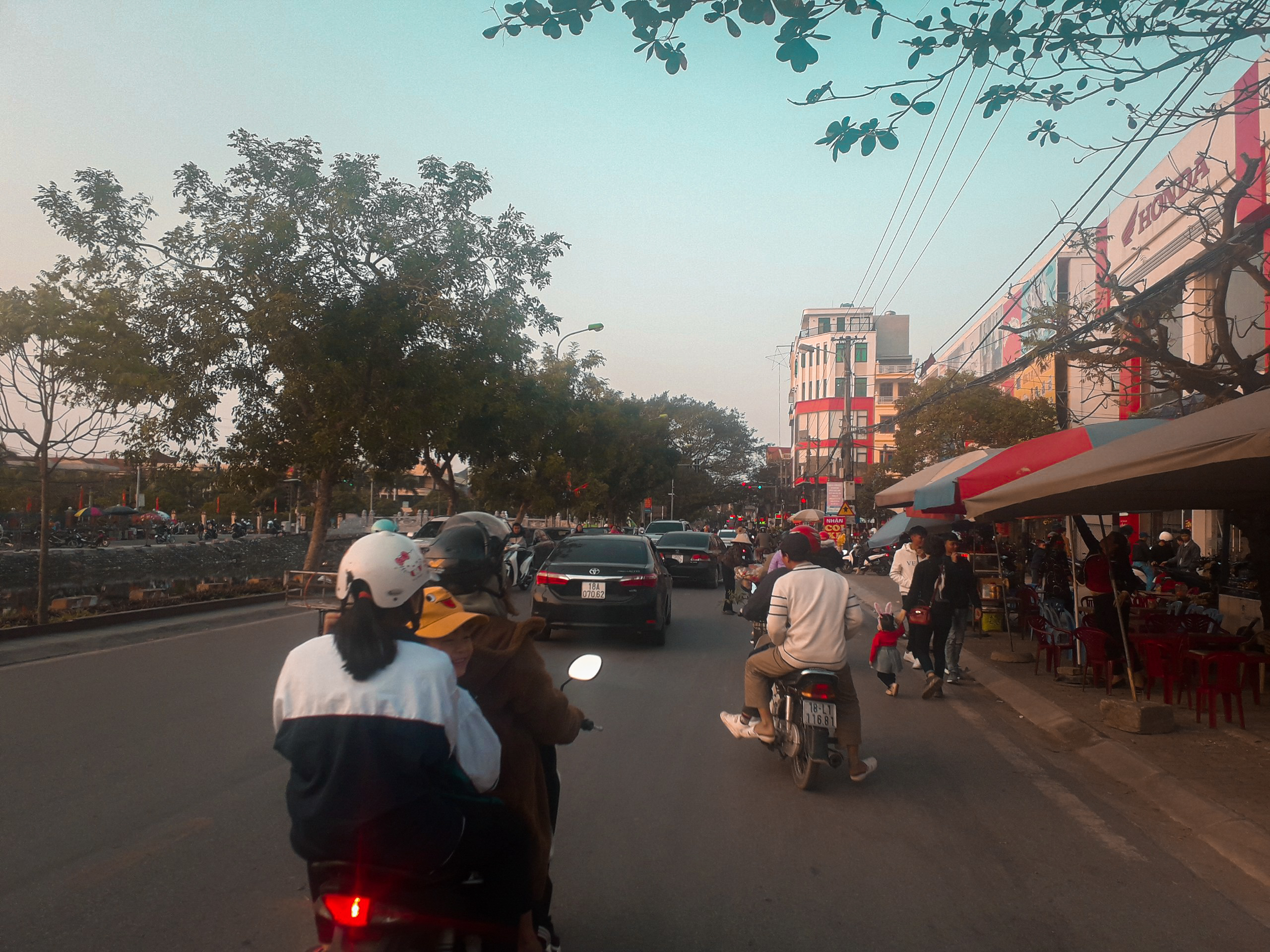
- A road in Liễu Đề township.
- Nickname: "Sea Lion" (Hải Lân)
- Location within Vietnam Location within Southeast Asia Location within Asia
- Country: Vietnam
- Region: Red River Delta
- Province: Nam Định
- Existence: 1009 to August 30, 2025
- Central hall: 65CJ+488, Road 56, Nghĩa Trung commune (Note: From 2022 to 2025.)

Government
  - Type: Rural district
  - People Committee's Chairman: Hoàng Trọng Nghĩa
  - People Council's Chairman: Trương Thị Giang
  - Front Committee's Chairman: Vũ Văn Điệp
  - Party Committee's Secretary: Nguyễn Văn Thi

Area
  - Total: 254.6 km^{2} (98.3 sq mi)

Population (2024)
  - Total: ≈ 200,000
  - Density: 702/km^{2} (1,820/sq mi)
  - Ethnicities: Kinh; Tanka
- Time zone: UTC+7 (Indochina Time)
- ZIP code: 07400 (Note: An official code from 2022 to 2025.)
- Website: Nghiahung.Namdinh.gov.vn; Nghiahung.Namdinh.dcs.vn

Nghĩa Hưng [ŋiʔiə˧˥:hɨŋ˧˧] is a former rural district of Nam Định province in the Red River Delta region of Vietnam.

== History ==
=== Middle ages ===
According to Đại Việt sử ký toàn thư, about the Tang dynasty, there was a natural seaport called "大鴉" (Note: From this time, this name is still unclear what Annamese people read officially in the Middle Ages are like "Đại Ác" or "Đại Nha".) (means "crow") in the downstream of the Đáy River. Just know that, around 979, the Champa navy passed through this seaport to enter the fight with the forces of Emperor Lê Hoàn at the citadel of Tràng An. Once again, in February 1044, Emperor Minh Đạo passed this location to invade Champa. He changed its name as "Đại An" (大安, "great peace") to pray for luck. (Note: 鴉 (ác, "crow") is homogeneous with 惡 (ác, "evil") in Vietnamese language.)

Thus, since the Lý dynasty, Đại An rural district (大安縣, Đại An huyện) began to be formed. Later, the Ming dynasty changed it to Đại Loan rural district (Note: It means "great bay".) (大灣縣, Đại Loan huyện) and made a part of Kiến Bình prefecture. However, the Later Lê dynasty restored its old name in 1469 and made it a part of Nghĩa Hưng prefecture (義興府, Nghĩa Hưng phủ).

In the 2nd year of Gia Long (1803), the Nguyễn dynasty made Đại An part of Thanh Hoa outer garrison. But by the 5th year (1806), it was returned to Nghĩa Hưng.

About the 3rd year of Minh Mệnh (1822), Nghĩa Hưng prefecture was officially part of Nam Định garrison (Note: This area includes two modern provinces : Nam Định and Thái Bình.). Later, by the 13rd year of Minh Mệnh (1832), Nam Định garrison was changed as Nam Định province.

=== 20th century ===
In 1945, the Government of the Democratic Republic of Vietnam abolished the prefecture regime nationwide. Therefore, Nghĩa Hưng rural district (義興縣, huyện Nghĩa Hưng) was officially established. However, under the State of Vietnam regime, it was called as Nghĩa Hưng district (義興郡, quận Nghĩa Hưng). Later, until 1953, some Nghĩa Hưng communes on the left bank of the Đào River were transferred to Ý Yên rural district.

About the period from 1963 to 1965, the North Vietnamese government continuously reviewed, adjusted and strengthened the boundaries of hamlets, villages and communes in the area of Nghĩa Hưng rural district.

On June 30, 1965, the Ministry of Home Affairs issued Decision 239-NV to establish Nông Trường Rạng Đông township (Note: It means "Dawn farm".) (thị trấn Nông Trường Rạng Đông) in Nghĩa Hưng. That was the first municipality in Nghĩa Hưng rural district.

According to Decision 51-BT of the Chairman of the Council of Ministers of Vietnam on March 27, 1978, Nam Điền commune was established as new economic zone (vùng kinh tế mới Nam Điền).

On February 13, 1987, the Council of Ministers issued Decision 26-HĐBT to establish Liễu Đề township (Note: "Liễu Đề" was one of the old names of Đại An seaport, what originated from "keluar" (means "port") in Annamese phonetic transcription.) (thị trấn Liễu Đề) on the basis of merging Nghĩa Hiệp commune and part of Nghĩa Trung commune. Besides, Nông Trường Rạng Đông township has been shortened as Rạng Đông township.

=== 21st century ===
On November 19, 2007, the Government of Vietnam issued Decision 171/2007/NĐ-CP to establish Quỹ Nhất township (Note: "Quỹ Nhất" was also one of the old names of Đại An seaport, what originated from "keluar" (means "port") in Annamese phonetic transcription.) (thị trấn Quỹ Nhất) on the basis of the entire natural and demographic area of Nghĩa Hòa commune.

On July 23, 2024, the National Assembly Standing Committee issued Resolution 1104/NQ-UBTVQH15 on the arrangement of district and commune-level administrative units in Nam Định province, what toom effect from September 1, 2024. Accordingly :

- Merging 3 communes Nghĩa Đồng, Nghĩa Minh and Nghĩa Thịnh to being Ông Thịnh commune.
- Merging 2 communes Nghĩa Bình and Nghĩa Tân to expand Quỹ Nhất township.

== Geography ==
=== Topography ===
Since September 1, 2024, Nghĩa Hưng rural district includes 20 commune-level administrative units.

- 3 townships : Liễu Đề, Quỹ Nhất and Rạng Đông.
- 17 communes : Đồng Thịnh, Hoàng Nam, Nam Điền, Nghĩa Châu, Nghĩa Hải, Nghĩa Hồng, Nghĩa Hùng, Nghĩa Lạc, Nghĩa Lâm, Nghĩa Lợi, Nghĩa Phong, Nghĩa Phú, Nghĩa Sơn, Nghĩa Thái, Nghĩa Thành, Nghĩa Trung (district capital), Phúc Thắng.

Nghĩa Hưng is the farthest district to the South of both provinces Nam Định and Ninh Bình. Its terrain is almost flat, what is formed by the alluvial of the Đáy River. Currently it still tends to receive additional accretion to gradually expand to the Tonkin Gulf from the South. The Southern part of Nghĩa Hưng is merged with the entire area of Kim Sơn rural district to form the Đại An peninsula (formerly the Thần Phù or Thần Đầu peninsula), where is the farthest point of the Red River Delta.

Besides, the area of Nghĩa Hưng has a narrow shape, what has a position like a system of the estuaries. The entire district includes many canals and lakes, which intertwines each other based on the three most important streams : Đào, Đáy and Ninh Cơ. Therefore, from Nghĩa Hưng can move easily to large municipalities through only Đáy River, which are Ninh Bình, Nam Định, Phủ Lý, Hưng Yên and Hà Nội.

Currently, the entire coastline of 12 km belonging to 5 localities (Nam Điền, Nghĩa Lợi, Nghĩa Hải, Phúc Thắng and Rạng Đông) has been banned for bathing activities to become a biosphere reserve according to UNESCO standards. It includes salt fields, mangroves and some pure sand beaches.

=== Population ===
As of 2024 Nghĩa Hưng rural district had a population of 200,000. In particular, all people are registered as Kẻ Kinh. Moreover, there is a half of the Roman Catholics.

According to records of the Holy See, the territory of Nghĩa Hưng rural district was honored to be the first place in the whole Indochinese peninsula to welcome the Gospel. It was in 1533, when a man named Ignatius stealthily entered the mission, which was called the "Cross Party" (Thập Tự đảng) later by the Annamese courts.

Currently, the area of the rural district belongs to three deaneries. All are under the Bùi Chu Diocese (or Nam Định Diocese).

- Lạc Đạo : 18 parishes with 33,547 parishioners.
- Liễu Đề : 12 p.es with 22,575 p.rs.
- Quỹ Nhất : 18 p.es with 41,001 p.rs.

== See also ==
- Hải Hậu district
- Vụ Bản district
- Xuân Trường district
- Ý Yên district
