= Nam Trực district =

Coordinates: 20.3365°N 106.2167°E

Nam Trực district Huyện Nam Trực Nam Chân huyện
- Rural District
- Location within Vietnam Location within Southeast Asia Location within Asia
- Country: Vietnam
- Region: Red River Delta
- Province: Nam Định
- Establishment: 1833
- Central hall: 85MH+25W, Nam Giang township

Government
  - Type: Rural district
  - People Committee's Chairman: Lưu Văn Dũng
  - People Council's Chairman: Lưu Quang Tuyển
  - Front Committee's Chairman: Trần Ngọc Hợp
  - Party Committee's Secretary: Lưu Quang Tuyển

Area
  - Rural District: 163.89 km^{2} (63.28 sq mi)

Population (2021)
  - Rural District: 185,840
  - Density: 1,184/km^{2} (3,070/sq mi)
  - Urban: 17,950
- Time zone: UTC+7 (Indochina Time)
- ZIP code: 420000
- Area code: 20°19′58″B 106°10′40″Đ
- Website: Namtruc.Namdinh.gov.vn; Namtruc.Namdinh.dcs.vn

Nam Trực [naːm˧˧:ʨɨ̰ʔk˨˩] is a former rural district of Nam Định province in the Red River Delta of Vietnam.

== History ==
=== Middle Ages ===
Since the Sui dynasty, this area belonged to a fairly large administrative unit called Tây Chân district (huyện Tây Chân). When the Trần dynasty was founded, Tây Chân belonged to Thiên Trường prefecture. Its name implies that it was the periphery of a small urban complex called Tức Mặc village, where officials and aristocrats were concentrated.

In the Revival Lê dynasty, because its name coincided with the title of Lord Trịnh Tạc, it was changed to Nam Chân district (huyện Nam Chân).

In the 14th year of Minh Mệnh, Nam Chân district was separated into Nam Trực and Trực Ninh.

=== XX century ===
In 1945 when Vietnam was independent, Nam Trực district (huyện Nam Trực) had all 32 communes : Bắc Sơn, Nam An, Nam Bình, Nam Chấn, Nam Cường, Nam Điền, Nam Đồng, Nam Dương, Nam Giang, Nam Hải, Nam Hoa, Nam Hồng, Nam Hùng, Nam Lợi, Nam Long, Nam Minh, Nam Mỹ, Nam Nghĩa, Nam Ninh, Nam Phong, Nam Phúc, Nam Quan, Nam Quang, Nam Tân, Nam Thắng, Nam Thịnh, Nam Tiến, Nam Toàn, Nam Trung, Nam Vân, Nam Xá, and Thái Sơn.

On March 26, 1968, according to Decision 41-CP of the Government of the Democratic Republic of Vietnam, the two districts of Nam Trực and Trực Ninh re-merged into Nam Ninh district (huyện Nam Ninh).

From 1971 to 1996, the number of communes continuously decreased due to the merger.

On February 26, 1997, to implement Decree 19/NĐ-CP of the Government of Vietnam, Nam Ninh district was re-divided into two new districts : Nam Trực and Trực Ninh. However, the two communes Nam Phong and Nam Vân of Nam Trực district (huyện Nam Trực) have been merged into the peripheral area of Nam Định city.

== Geography ==
Nam Trực rural district covers an area of 163.89 km^{2}. Specifically, its entire area is low plain, which is not higher than sea level. It sentenced the interference of Đào River and Red River. In particular, the Đào River ("Picking channel") is inherently an artificial canal, which was formed in the Trần dynasty, which has a very important position in traffic and irrigation for the whole district. In addition, there is another small river called Châu Thành, but only the minority of the Đào River and the amount of water is only enough to irrigate some communes in the rice transplant stage. Some other sources of water like Lữ, Rõng, Ghềnh are almost exhausted all year round and only actually have water in the big flood season.

In the national planning map of Vietnam, the area of Nam Trực is located on Highway 21. However, its identification point is three roads, which is named after colors : Yellow, white and black. These three routes together form a triangle, in the middle of which is the capital of the rural district. These names were from the song This Earth is Ours by composer Trương Quang Lục, which was used as the signature tune of the Pioneer's program of the Nam Ninh District Broadcasting Station (now The Voice of Trực Ninh People) since 1980s.

Nam Trực now consists of 20 communes : Bình Minh, Điền Xá, Đồng Sơn, Hồng Quang, Nam Cường, Nam Dương, Nam Giang, Nam Hải, Nam Hoa, Nam Hồng, Nam Hùng, Nam Lợi, Nam Mỹ, Nam Thái, Nam Thắng, Nam Thanh, Nam Tiến, Nam Toàn, Nghĩa An, and Tân Thịnh. The district capital lies at Nam Giang commune. Therefore, this is the only rural district in Vietnam that does not have an official urban area yet.

As of 2021 the population of the whole district only reached nearly 186,000, which was much decreased compared to 2003. This is considered by experts due to the low birth rate and the situation of young people migrating to places with more job opportunities.

According to statistics, about 40% of the people of Nam Trực follows Catholicism, followed by a significant number of people who follow atheist theory, while other religions account for extremely low proportion.

== Culture ==
Nam Trực parish (giáo xứ Nam Trực) is part of Nam Định diocese with the patron of the Rosary. It was founded in 1913, when the parish church in Nam Giang commune was built. The current parish priest is bishop Peter Nguyễn Đức Long, who officially took his mission at 09:30 on July 11, 2019.

Until early 2024, all 400 relics in Nam Trực rural district were ranked from the provincial to national level. These cultural works are mostly associated with folk festivals, which always take place in the first lunar month every year.

Also according to the practice, the District Sports Congress (Đại-hội Thể-dục Thể-thao Toàn-huyện, ĐHTDTTTH Nam Trực) is held in August every year, that is, after four months of elaborate preparation. The subjects are often a combination of tradition with the Olympic movement to select talents for the country.

=== Cuisine ===
After Mỹ Lộc rural district was merged into Nam Định city (2024), Nam Trực is only behind the City in terms of the diversity and originality of local cuisine.

According to folk legend, in 1925, on the occasion of a drought with the crop failure and the cattle would die a lot, a poor farmer named Cồ Hữu Vạng burdened the pho to Hanoi for sale. According to Annamese law, the killing of cattle for agriculture was a serious crime, but buffaloes and cows have died of hunger, it could be done. It is a milestone for the birth of famous beef pho. Therefore, Nam Định folk often handed down an idiom of pho : "Vụ Bản has buffaloes, Nam Trực has cows" (Vụ Bản đã trâu, mà Nam Trực bò). It refers to two typical dishes of the two rural districts. So far, Phở Cồ brand has spread to the world. However, according to the descendants of Cồ clan, their fathers who worked as a noodle production of pho, so beef pho was invented. Currently, Giao Cù village (old name : Kẻ Cồ) regularly organizes a festival to honor the pho industry (Pho Festival) in each rice harvest, every twice a year.

Nam Trực sour pork (nem nắm Nam Trực) has been a brand that has been registered for copyright protection since the 2010s. Besides the sour pork materials that are too popular, the difference of Nam Trực brand is that the combination with fragrant rice (gạo tám).

Over time, the rural district also continuously produces other typical dishes.

=== Notable persons ===
Customs in Nam Trực is often said to have a tradition of studiousness. Evidence is the appearance of many bachelors and doctors in Hanese studies. In particular, the number of doctors was 18, not counting other schools.

- The three First Doctors of Annamese imperial exam : Nguyễn Hiền, Vũ Tuấn Chiêu, Trần Văn Bảo
- Poet Nguyễn Đức Mậu (born 1948)
- Deputy Prime-Ministers : Đặng Việt Châu (1914–1987), Ngô Xuân Lộc (born 1940), Vũ Văn Ninh (born 1955).
- Ministers : Mai Chí Thọ (1922–2007), Đinh Đức Thiện (1914–1986), Phan Văn Giang (born 1960).

Besides : Lê Hiến Giản (1341–1390), Lê Hiến Từ (1341–1390), Phạm Khắc Thận (1441–1509), Nguyễn Ý, Tống Hân, Trần Đình Huyên, Vũ Kiệt, Vũ Đoan, Phạm Tráng, Ngô Bật Lượng, Đào Minh Dương, Nguyễn Công Bật, Đặng Phi Hiển, Nguyễn Thế Trân, Nguyễn Danh Nho, Phạm Duy Cơ, Vũ Đình Dung, Ngô Thế Vinh, Lê Đức Thọ (1911–1990), Nguyễn Văn Vịnh (1918–1978), Trần Xuân Bách (1924–2006), Viễn Chi (1919–1999), Nguyễn Văn Tính (1944–2006), Trần Quy Kiên, Đặng Hồng Đức, Vũ Đình Chuẩn, Trần Ánh Dương.

== Economy ==
Before the 1990s, the entire production of Nam Trực district was basically growing rice, vegetables and forging agricultural tools. Vân Chàng village has been written by old chronicles as one of the famous forging wards in the Empire of Annam since the 14th century. The motivation to promote its prosperity comes from agriculture and river trade. At the current Quảng Nam Provincial Museum, some artifacts have engraved the characters and symbols of the workers from Vân Chàng, which was once in a shipwreck in Palao Campa. Because the district's characteristics are not any forest and mountain, materials such as wood or metal must be purchased from its outside. This is invisible that stimulates the development of transporting wood with barge and scrap collection.

Since 2010–2013, the District People's Committee has implemented the policy of economic restructuring, so the rural face of Nam Trực has had a deeper change than the previous decades. In the whole district, there have been production complexes (tổ-hợp sản-xuất) according to the new model to replace the processing of cooperatives, which is too backward compared to the international economic situation. Specific as : Báo Đáp village specializes with making paper lamps and flowers, Xối Trì village with blowing glass, Vị Khê village with ornamental plant, Rục Kiều lane of Cổ Gia hamlet with nón tơi, Liên Tỉnh hamlet of Nam Hồng commune with woven. Besides : Đại An worm silk, Vô Hoạn recycling scrap, Thượng Nông peanut candy.

Based on the 2022 FDI data of the Nam Định Provincial Statistical Office, the average of investment capital in Nam Trực rural district from 1989 to 2021 is about 2 trillions Vietnamese dongs each year. The main field of investment is procurement of production equipment and construction industry. Besides the state credit is capital flows from Taiwan and South Korea businesses. In particular, the Korean businessmen really only has an eye on this market since 2017.

== See also ==
- Vụ Bản district
- Vũ Thư district
- Xuân Trường district
