= Nguyễn Đức Mậu =

Vietnamese poet (1948–2026)

Nguyễn Đức Mậu (14 January 1948 – 8 April 2026) was a Vietnamese poet. His The Old Soldier is one of many war poems to carry the idea of a nation that has been at war for generations. He was born in Nam Trực District, Nam Định.

Mậu died on 8 April 2026, at the age of 78.
