= Kẽm Trống Bay =

Bay in Vietnam

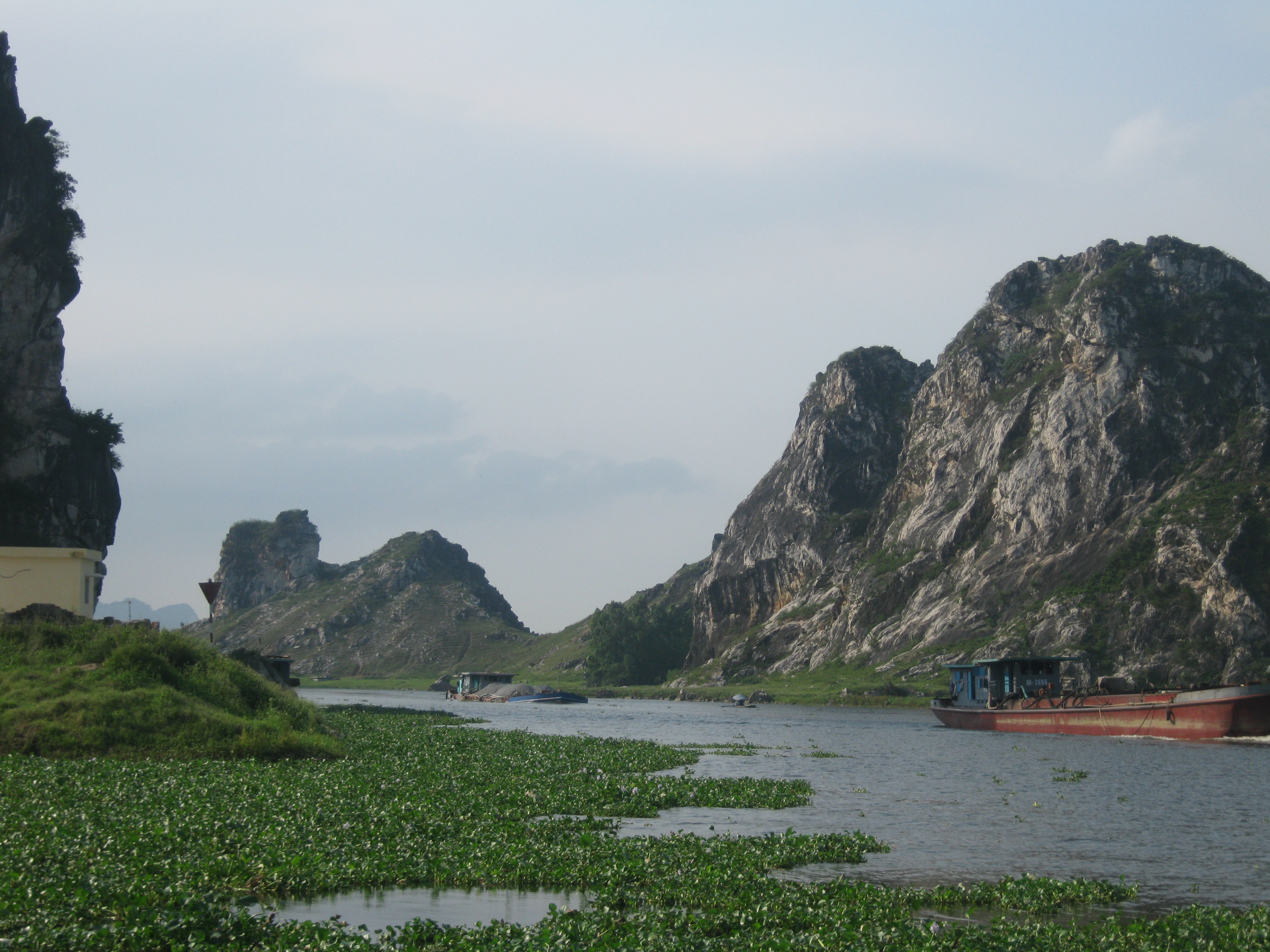
Kem Trong-Dich Long scenic area

Kẽm Trống Bay is located in Thanh Hải village, Thanh Liêm District, Hà Nam Province of Vietnam.

== Geography ==
It is about 80 km to the south, along the National Road No 1. Kẽm Trống includes a stream, mountains, fields and trees. The Đáy River flows through the area.

On the banks of the river, mountains and regularly here and there, and ledges come up to the water edge. There are many caves and grottoes in the mountains such as Đọi (Bat) cave, Lươn (going through) cave, Nut (breaking) grotto; many stalactites and stalagmites can be seen in those caves and grottoes.

The scenery of Kẽm Trống is very picturesque and poetic. Hồ Xuân Hương, a poet in the 18th century, who was so famous that Vietnamese people awarded her the title of "Princess of poetry", wrote a poem on the sight of Kẽm Trống when visiting it, as follows:

"On the two sides are mountains, The nice stream is between, This is Kẽm Trống, is it right? The wind shakes tree branches with crackles, And makes waves sounding merrily..."

There are many myths on the visits of Kings, Lords, Princes, and other visitors to Kẽm Trống, the natural landscape rewarded to the region of Mt Đọi and Châu River (the other way naming the land of Hà Nam).
