= Xuân Trường district =

Coordinates: 20.300°N 106.367°E

Xuân Trường district Huyện Xuân Trường Hải Thanh huyện
- Rural District
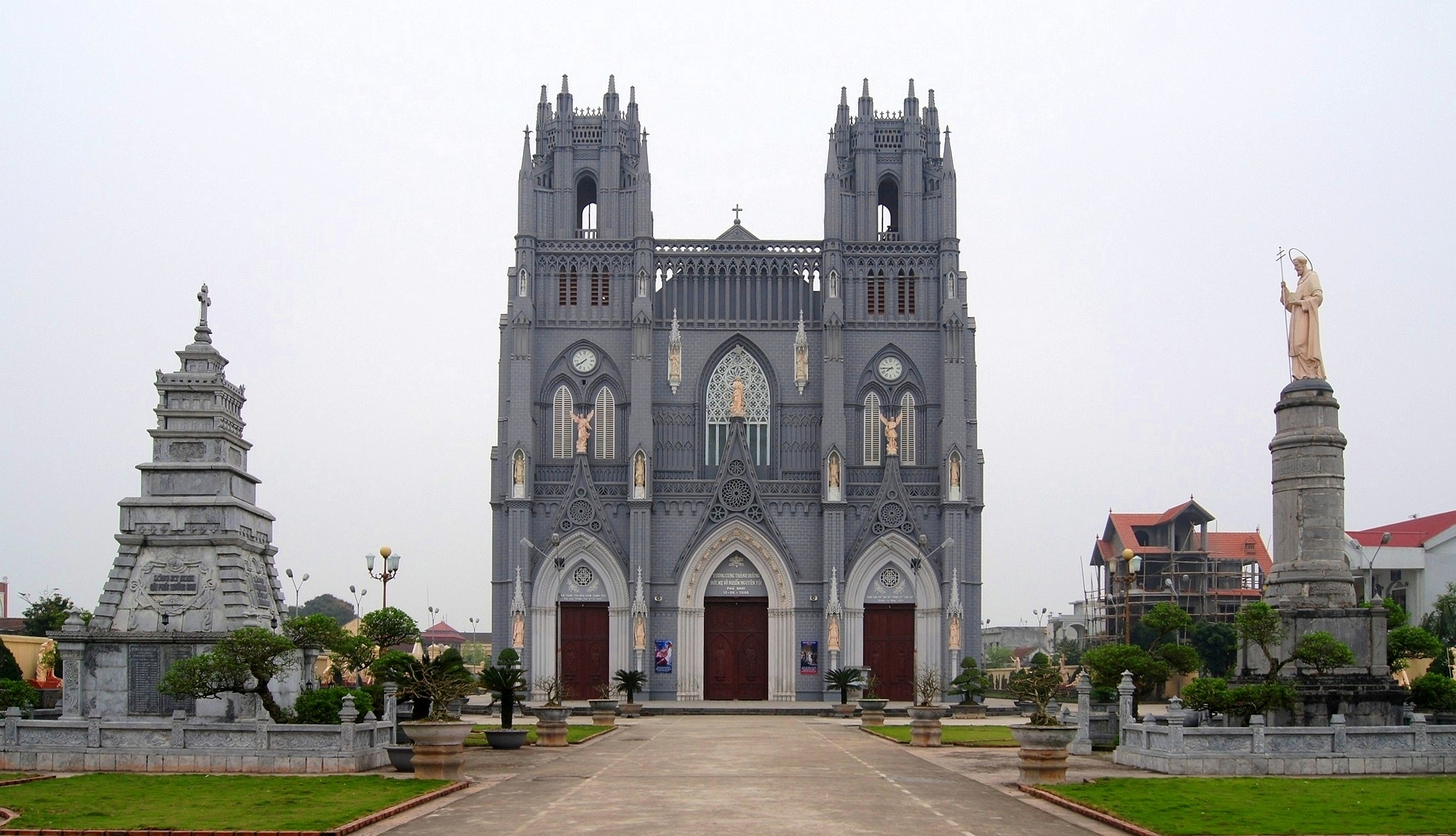
- Phú Nhai Immaculate Conception Cathedral Basilica in Xuân Phương commune.
- Country: Vietnam
- Region: Red River Delta
- Province: Nam Định
- Existence: 1010 to August 30, 2025
- Central hall: 78VJ+7V7, Xuân Trường township

Government
  - Type: Rural district
  - People Committee's Chairman: Trịnh Văn Hoàng
  - People Council's Chairman: Bùi Văn Hảo
  - Front Committee's Chairman: Trần Văn Vỵ
  - Party Committee's Secretary: Bùi Văn Hảo

Area
  - Total: 112.8 km^{2} (43.6 sq mi)

Population (2016)
  - Total: ≈ 190,000
  - Density: 1,685/km^{2} (4,360/sq mi)
  - Ethnicities: Kinh; Tanka
- Time zone: UTC+7 (Indochina Time)
- ZIP code: 427100 (Note: An official code from 2022 to 2025.)
- Website: Xuantruong.Namdinh.gov.vn; Xuantruong.Namdinh.dcs.vn

Xuân Trường [swən˧˧:ʨɨə̤ŋ˨˩] is a former rural district of Nam Định province in the Red River Delta region of Vietnam.

== History ==
=== Middle Ages ===
According to An Nam chí lược, An Nam chí nguyên and Đại Việt sử ký toàn thư, around 1010, there was an administrative unit in the Red River estuary area called Hải Thanh rural district (海清縣, Hải Thanh huyện). However, its boundaries are still unclear. (Note: Ban chấp hành Đảng bộ huyện Xuân Trường (2004). Lịch sử Đảng bộ và nhân dân huyện Xuân Trường 1930 - 2000. Công ty in Tạp chí Cộng sản.)

Until the 2nd year of Kiến Trung (1226), Hải Thanh was changed to Thiên Thanh rural district (Note: In avoiding the same name as Hải-ấp (海邑, "sea hamlet"), where the Trần Dynasty's ancestor was born.) (天清縣, Hải Thanh huyện). However, when the Ming Dynasty controlled An Nam, the court continued to change it to Phụng Hóa rural district (奉化縣, Phụng Hóa huyện). When the Later Lê Dynasty recovered the autonomy in 1428, the court restored its old name and said allowed it to be part of Sơn Nam garrison. Shortly thereafter, Sơn Nam garrison continued to be divided into two prefectures Thiên Bản and Thiên Trường.

In 1862, Emperor Tự Đức issued a royal order to change Thiên Trường prefecture to Xuân Trường prefecture (春長府, Xuân Trường phủ). From that time, the prefecture consisted of three rural districts as Giao Thủy, Nam Trực and Trực Ninh.

By 1888, some small parts of rural districts Giao Thủy and Trực Ninh were separated to establish Hải Hậu district. Therefore, Xuân Trường prefecture included four rural districts : Giao Thủy, Hải Hậu, Nam Trực and Trực Ninh.

However, in 1889, Emperor Thành Thái abolished the prefecture regime. As the center of the prefecture for a long time, Xuân Trường boldly separated from Giao Thủy district to become Xuân Trường rural district (春長縣, Xuân Trường huyện).

=== XX century ===
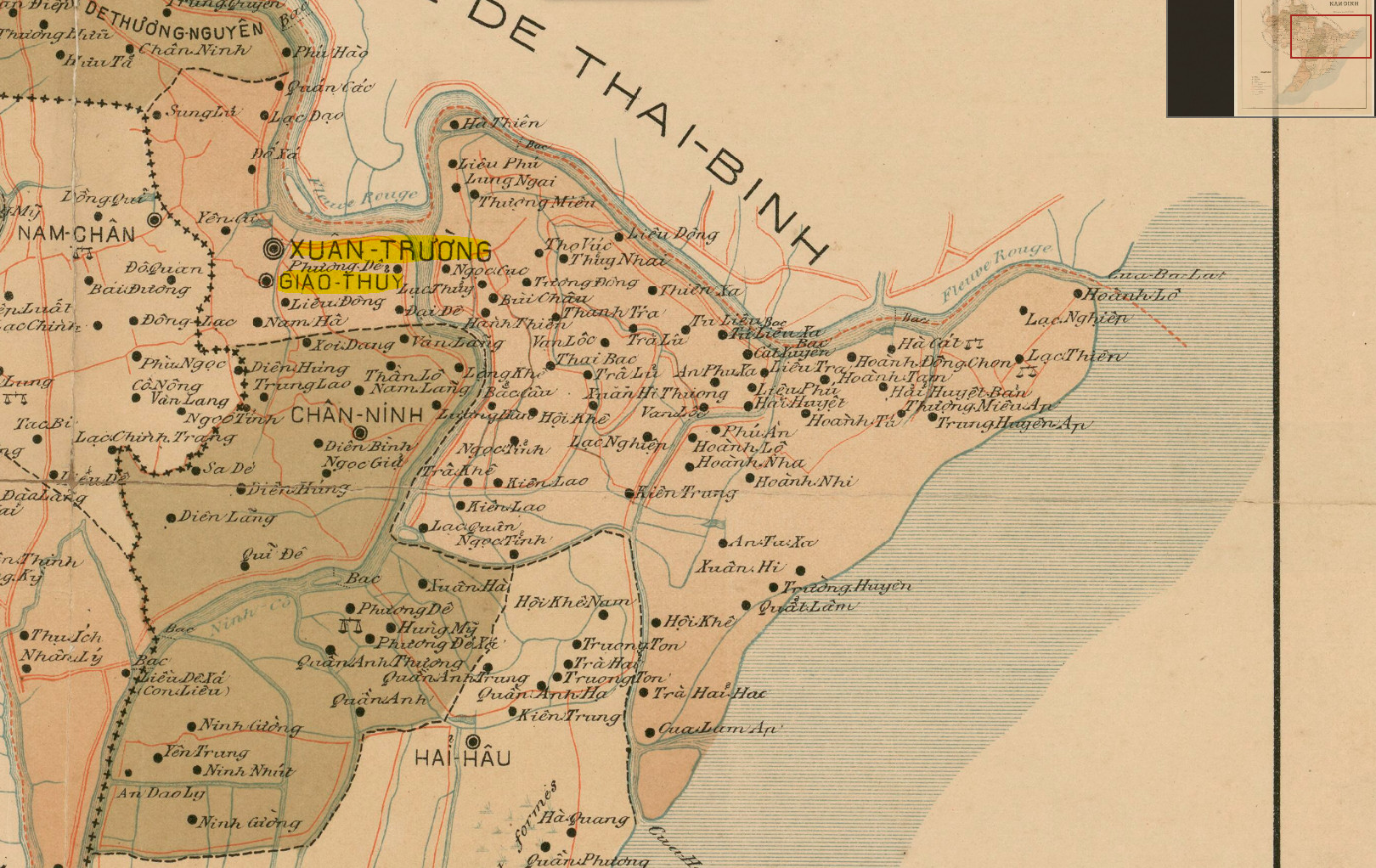
Xuân Trường prefecture in 1891 included two rural districts Xuân Trường and Giao Thủy.

In 1913, Mr Bùi Bằng Đoàn started his career as a royal official as the district magistrate of Xuân Trường rural district. During his time as district magistrate in the Xuân Trường district he implemented the construction of the White Dragon dyke (白龍陪, Bạch Long bồi) to prevent salt water from contaminating the area to help agricultural production allowing for productive rice and strawberry fields to grow in the area. In recognition of his merits, the people of the Xuân Trường rural district made a sacrifice for the young "parent of the people" (父母之民, phụ mẫu chi dân) right at the place where he took office.

In 1934, Emperor Bảo Đại continued to adjust the boundaries of the two districts. Thus, Sò River has become a natural boundary of Giao Thủy and Xuân Trường.

In 1945 the district was changed to Xuân Trường and belonged to Nam Ha province in 1965. In 1967 the district re-merged with Giao Thủy into Xuân Thủy rural district (春水縣, huyện Xuân Thủy). The district re-established its old name in March 1997.

=== XXI century ===
Decree 137/2003 of the Government of Vietnam on November 14, 2003, led to the establishment of Xuân Trường township (thị trấn Xuân Trường), where included as the entire area and population of Xuân Hùng commune and a part of the area and population of Xuân Ngọc commune.

== Geography ==
=== Topography ===
Since August 2024, the area of Xuân Trường rural district has all 14 commune-level administrative units.

- 1 municipality : Xuân Trường township (capital).
- 13 communes : Thọ Nghiệp, Trà Lũ, Xuân Châu, Xuân Giang, Xuân Hồng, Xuân Ngọc, Xuân Ninh, Xuân Phú, Xuân Phúc, Xuân Tân, Xuân Thành, Xuân Thượng, Xuân Vinh.

The total area of Xuân Trường is 1,128 km^{2}, meaning that, it is the smallest rural district in Nam Định province. It is also the only district in the Red River Delta almost not adjacent to other localities through road but river : Thái Bình province from Hồng in the North, Trực Ninh district from Ninh Cơ in the West and Giao Thủy district from Sò in the East.

According to the statistics of the Nam Định Provincial People's Committee since the 1980s, Xuân Trường rural district is the lowest terrain with many locations still under the sea level. Therefore, although the district has almost no rivers, it is often suffered from heavy flooding in the rainy seasons.

=== Population ===
As of 2016 Xuân Trường rural district had a population of 190,000. In particular, all people are registered as Kẻ Kinh. Moreover, there is a half of the Roman Catholics.

According to records of the Holy See, the territory of Xuân Trường rural district was honored to be the first place in the whole Indochinese peninsula to welcome the Gospel. It was in 1533, when a man named Ignatius stealthily entered the mission, which was called the "Cross Party" (Thập Tự đảng) later by the Annamese courts.

Currently, the area of the rural district belongs to three deaneries. All are under the Bùi Chu Diocese (or Nam Định Diocese).

- Bùi Chu : 12 parishes with 31,454 parishioners.
- Phú Nhai : 11 p.es with 24,094 p.rs.
- Quần Phương : 18 p.es with 48,112 p.rs.

== Culture ==
With about half of the population of Catholics, the traditional customs in Xuân Trường rural district are a blend of wet rice culture with church-style rituals.

=== Cuisine ===
- Dame Thành nem (nem bùi Bà Thành) in Xuân Phúc commune.
- Kiên Lao wine (rượu trắng Kiên Lao) in Xuân Phúc commune.
- Trà Lũ mung-bean cake (bánh hú Trà Lũ) in Trà Lũ commune.
- Trà Lũ strawberry worms (Note: The biscuits are shaped like strawberry worms.) (sâu dâu Trà Lũ).
- Vạn Lộc mouse meat (thịt chuột Vạn Lộc) in Xuân Phong commune.
- Xuân Bắc meat roll (nem chả Xuân Bắc) in Xuân Bắc commune.
- Xuân Đài fragrant rice (tám xoan Xuân Đài) in Xuân Đài commune.
- Xuân Kiên Bánh tráng (bánh đa nem Xuân Kiên) in Xuân Kiên commune.
- Xuân Tiến raw fish dishes (gỏi cá Xuân Tiến) in Xuân Tiến commune.

=== Tourism ===
- Memorial house of former General Secretary Trường Chinh
- Hành Thiện Thần Quang Pagoda
- Xuân Hồng cultural village/commune
- Bùi Chu Bishop (Xuân Ngọc commune)
- Phu Chew (Xuân Phương) church
- Kiên Lao temples (Xuân Kiên)
- Tho (Xuân Phong)
- Temple Spring Group (Xuan Hung)
- Xuân (Xuân Thuỷ) Greek temple
- Xuân Trung Pagoda (Xuân Trung)
- Nghĩa Xá Pagoda (Xuân Ninh)
- Temple An Cu (Xuân Vinh)
- Keo Hành Thiện Pagoda festival

=== Notable persons ===
Xuân Trường is also a land of culture and history which was home to notable intellectuals and politicians.

- Buddhist monk Dương Không Lộ.
- General Secretary Trường Chinh
- Deputy President of Congress, Dang Quan Thuy
- Nguyen Dang Kinh, hero of the Pham Gia Trieu armed forces

== Economy ==
Xuân Trường is a major rice growing province and Xuân Đài rice - rice is still cultivated on 1,000 hectares (10,000,000 m^{2}) every year. The district has many traditional villages that produce crafts, including:

- Xuân Tiến - village of mechanics
- Xuân Hồng - village of mulberry planting, silkworm raising and pulling cocoons
- Xuân Phương - embroidery village
- Xuân Ninh - village of wine cooking
- Xuân Kiên - village of Bánh tráng

== See also ==
- Giao Thủy district
- Hải Hậu district
- Trực Ninh district
