= Vụ Bản district =

Coordinates: 20.383°N 106.117°E

Vụ Bản district Huyện Vụ Bản Thiên Bản huyện Hiển Khánh huyện
- Rural District
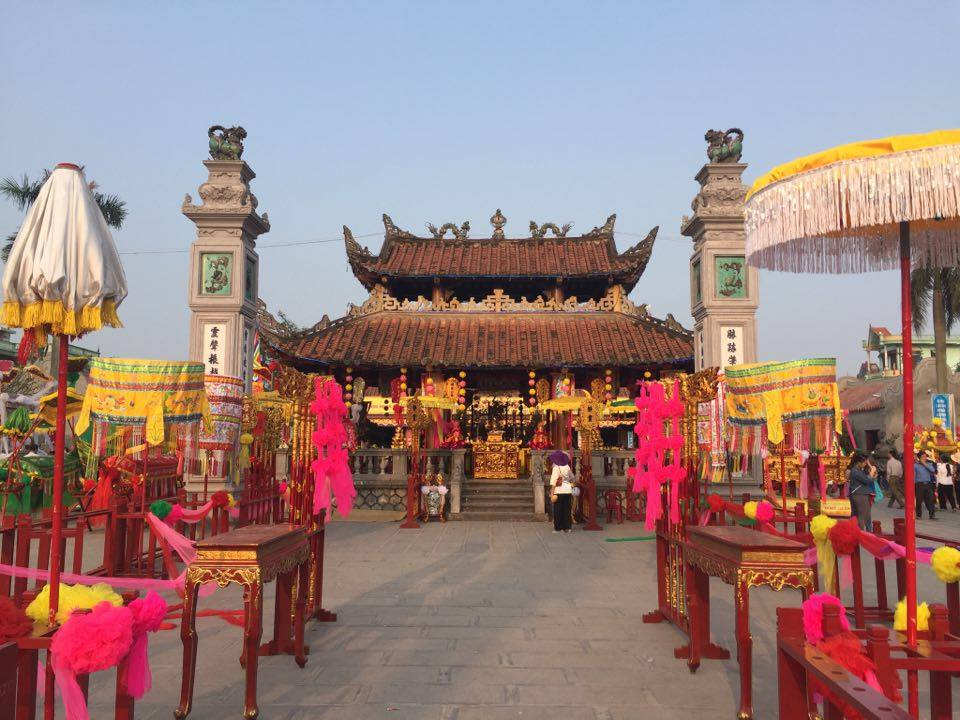
- Landscape of Tiên Hương Grand Temple.

- Motto: "Sacred land gave birth to extraordinary people" (Địa-linh sinh nhân-kiệt)
- Location within Vietnam Location within Southeast Asia Location within Asia
- Country: Vietnam
- Region: Red River Delta
- Province: Nam Định
- Existence: IX century to August 30, 2025
- Central hall: 83MH+97M, Lương Thế Vinh road, Gôi township

Government
  - Type: Rural district
  - People Committee's Chairman: Nguyễn Khắc Xung
  - People Council's chairman: Phạm Xuân Thao
  - Front Committee's chairman: Bùi Xuân Triệu
  - Party Committee's Secretary: Trần Minh Hoan

Area
  - Rural District: 152.81 km^{2} (59.00 sq mi)

Population (2020)
  - Rural District: 130,862
  - Density: 856/km^{2} (2,220/sq mi)
  - Urban: 7,340
  - Metro: 123,522
  - Ethnicities: Kinh; Tanka
- Time zone: UTC+07:00 (Indochina Time)
- ZIP code: 07250 (Note: An official code from December 31, 2022 to 2025.)
- Website: Vuban.Namdinh.gov.vn; Vuban.Namdinh.dcs.vn

Vụ Bản [vṵʔ˨˩:ɓa̰ːn˧˩˧] is a former rural district of Nam Định province in the Red River Delta region of Vietnam.

== History ==
=== Middle Ages ===
Before the land where is now the North Vietnam gained autonomy (ki-mi in ancient Annamese language), the entire area surrounding the Đáy River was called as Hiển Khánh Rural District. It means "the great joy".

About the Lý–Trần dynasties, Hiển Khánh was broken down into many new districts, including Thiên Bản Rural District. It means "the root of heavenly religion". Particularly, the commune where was used to be the center of Hiển Khánh Rural District was allowed to keep the old name.

In the 5th year of Vĩnh Lạc, the Ming Dynasty changed its name to Yên Bản Rural District, which means "the root of the tranquility".

About the years of Hồng Đức, name Thiên Bản was restored. It existed until 1861, when Emperor Tự Đức proceeded to repair Thiên Bản into Vụ Bản, Thiên Thư into Vũ Thư, Thiên Thụy into Thái Thụy, Thiên Quan into Nho Quan and Thiên Nguyên into Thủy Nguyên.

According to the historical process from the 18th century to the present, the boundary of Vụ Bản Rural District (Note: 論語: 學而-君子務本，本立而道生。-中國哲學書電子化計劃。) has almost unchanged in general.

=== 20th century ===
Some Vụ Bản areas adjacent to Nam Định City have been cut to Mỹ Lộc Rural District to build national highways and railways.

=== 21st century ===
To meet the criteria of the plan for arrangement and merger of administrative units, according to the Decision of the Nam Định Provincial People's Committee, which was issued in February 2025, from 00:00 on September 1 of the same year, Vụ Bản Rural District was officially dissolved.

== Geography ==
As of 2003 the district had a population of 130,672. The district covers an area of 148 km^{2}. The district capital lies at Gôi (from Côi Sơn, means "the one hill").

From 2024, Vụ Bản District has divided as :

- 1 municipality : Gôi capital-township.
- 13 communes : Cộng Hòa, Đại An, Đại Thắng, Hiển Khánh, Hợp Hưng, Kim Thái, Liên Minh, Minh Tân, Quang Trung, Tam Thanh, Thành Lợi, Trung Thành, Vĩnh Hào.

== Culture ==
During the 1920s the area was administered by the Vụ Bản district mandarin. (Note: Andrew David Hardy Red Hills : Migrants and the State in the Highlands of Vietnam 2005 Page 114 "NAV1/RND 3200, Mr Vũ Ung (Cờ Bàn village) to Vụ Bản district mandarin (Nam Định), 4 September 1924".)

The district includes the Vân Cát temple. (Note: Patta Kitiarsa Religious Commodifications in Asia : Marketing Gods 2008 Page 164 "Thus it helped legitimate mediumship practices in the temple but it was simultaneously useful in a competition for primacy with nearby Vân Cát temple which makes part of the same complex of temples in Vụ Bản district, Nam Định province".)

This is also the place of growth of many celebrities in many fields : Official Lương Thế Vinh, teacher Phạm Văn Nghị, writer Nguyễn Năng Tĩnh, politician Trần Tiến Đình, official Nguyễn Đức Thuận, poet Nguyễn Bính, scholar Trần Huy Liệu, composer Văn Cao, musician Văn Ký, vocalist Kim Tước, author Vũ Tú Nam. Besides, ministers Nguyễn Cơ Thạch, Song Hào, Phạm Bình Minh, Bùi Văn Nam.

The most famous specialty from Vụ Bản District is Siuchau candy (kẹo Sìu-châu), in there, Siu-chau means Seochew. This dish consists of white rice wrapped in malt, peanuts, sesame, banana oil and lots of sugar, so it is also known as "sausage sugar" (kẹo dồi) or "spun sugar" (kẹo kéo). In addition, there are buffalo meat pho (phở trâu) and honey jackfruit (mít mật). The jackfruit when ripe will be dark yellow as royal jelly and sweet will be like honey, even its scent can be detected from one kilometer.

In the years of crop failure, Vụ Bản residents have processed small lizard meat, a very popular animal in family gardens. Only their back and abdomen are used. The meat is deeply stuffed into the banana trunk. That banana body is then burned black, so the meat will absorb banana oil to become fragrant and flexible. In there, fire is made of straw or bamboo leaf. This specialty (thăn-lằn om chuối) now always appears in large restaurants with not pleasant prices. But in hot months the consumption of lizards often is surprisingly high.

== Economy ==
Vụ Bản Rural District has been praised by historians as the Red River Delta from the far past. Because there is no high mountain and not divided by many rivers, Vụ Bản has the most wet rice industry in North Vietnam.

However, everything has changed permanently since the early 20th century when the French began to pilot local industrial clusters. Smoke and wastewater mixed with concentratedchemicals not only pollute the air but also destroy the soil structure. From Vietnam's leading rich agricultural region, Vụ Bản's agricultural output could not even satisfy local food security.

Besides traditional wooden furniture manufacturing villages, Vụ Bản also has a very regarded waste treatment and recycling industry since the late 1980s. But in the roadmap from 2018 to 2038, the People's Committee of Nam Định Province co-operated with Japanese experts to prepare for the transition to the green industry to save the environment.

== See also ==
- Nam Định (city)
- Nghĩa Hưng
- Ý Yên
