= Ý Yên district =

Coordinates: 20.333°N 106.000°E

Ý Yên district Huyện Ý Yên
- Rural District
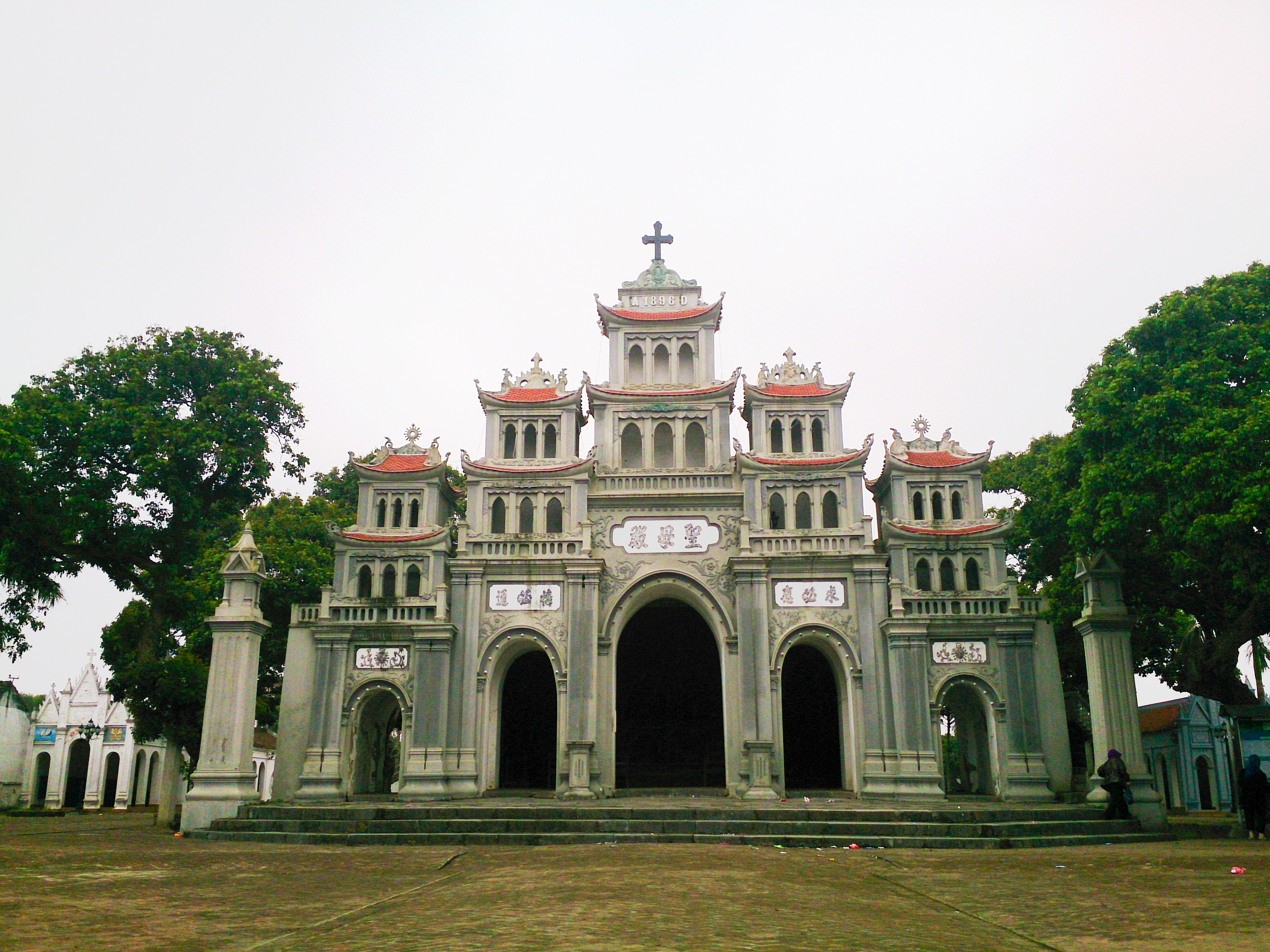
- View at the main door of Vĩnh Trị Church.

- Location within Vietnam Location within Southeast Asia Location within Asia
- Country: Vietnam
- Region: Red River Delta
- Province: Nam Định
- Existence: 1833 to August 30, 2025
- Central hall: 82H6+6QF, Provincial Route 57, Lâm township

Government
  - Type: Rural district

Area
  - Total: 240 km^{2} (93 sq mi)

Population (2003)
  - Total: 241,689
  - Density: 1,000/km^{2} (2,600/sq mi)
  - Ethnicities: Kinh; Tanka
- Time zone: UTC+7 (Indochina Time)
- ZIP code: 07300 (Note: An official code from 2022 to 2025.)
- Website: Yyen.Namdinh.gov.vn; Yyen.Namdinh.dcs.vn

Ý Yên [i˧˥:iən˧˧] is a former rural district of Nam Định province in the Red River Delta region of Vietnam.

== Geography ==
As of 2003 the district had a population of 241,689. The district covers an area of 240 km^{2}. The district capital lies at Lâm.
