= Đáy River =

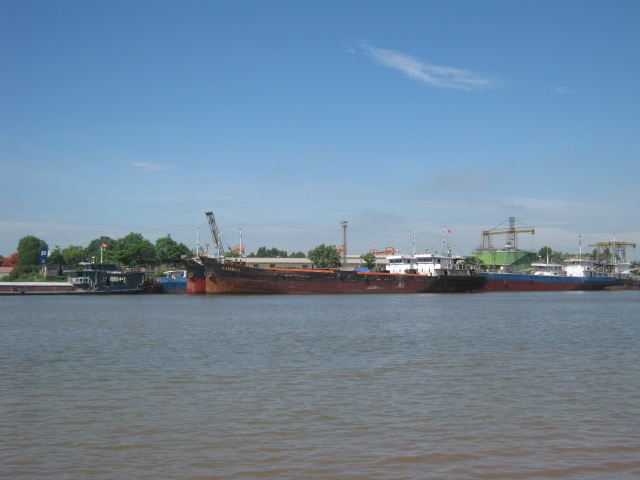
- Day River through Ninh Phúc Port

Location
- Country: Vietnam
- Region: Hà Nội, Hòa Bình, Hà Nam, Ninh Bình and Nam Định

Physical characteristics
- Source
  - location: Geladaindong Peak, Tanggula Mountains, Qinghai (Đan Phượng)
  - elevation: 5,042 m (16,542 ft)
- Mouth
  - location: Kim Sơn
  - coordinates: 19°54′47″N 106°05′42″E
  - elevation: 0 m (0 ft)
- Length: 240 km (150 mi)

The Day River (Vietnamese: Sông Đáy) is a river in Vietnam. It was formerly known as Hát River (Sông Hát or Hát Giang) or Gián Khẩu River (Sông Gián Khẩu). The river is a distributary of the Red River, draining into the Gulf of Tonkin.

The river has a length of 240 km and has a drainage basin of more than 7,500 km^{2}, flowing through Hanoi, and the provinces of Hòa Bình, Hà Nam, Ninh Bình and Nam Định.

== See also ==
- Kẽm Trống Bay
