= Hải Hậu district =

Coordinates: 20.167°N 106.250°E

Hải Hậu district Huyện Hải Hậu
- Rural District
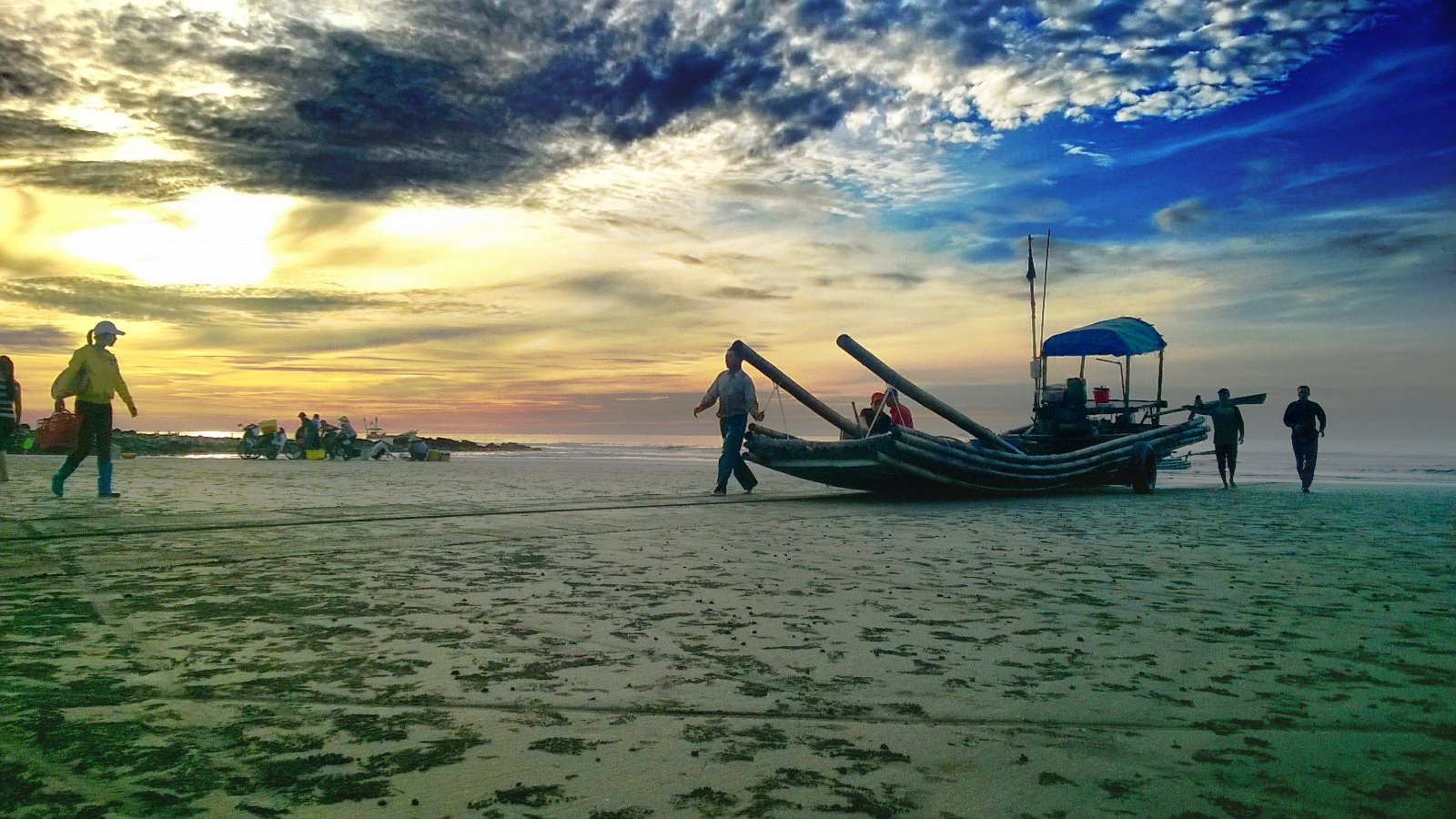
- A fishing village at dawn.

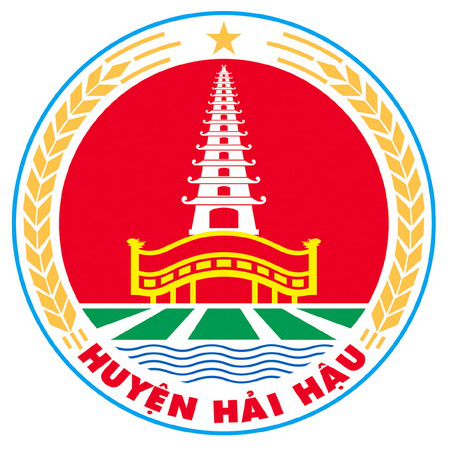
- Seal
- Nickname: "Blue Pearl" (Hòn ngọc bể)
- Motto: "Thượng gia hạ trì" (上家下池)
- Interactive map of Hải Hậu district
- Location within Vietnam Location within Southeast Asia Location within Asia
- Country: Vietnam
- Region: Red River Delta
- Province: Nam Định
- Existence: December 27, 1888 to August 30, 2025
- Central hall: No.1, Yên Định township

Government
  - Type: Rural district
  - People Committee's Chairman: Trần Thế Anh
  - People Council's Chairman: Trần Minh Hải
  - Front Committee's Chairman: Nguyễn Quang Hưng
  - Party Committee's Secretary: Trần Minh Hải

Area
  - Total: 228.14 km^{2} (88.09 sq mi)

Population (2022)
  - Total: 333,415
  - Density: 1,461/km^{2} (3,780/sq mi)
- Time zone: UTC+7 (Indochina Time)
- ZIP code: 0600020255-003 (Note: An official code from 2024 to 2025.)
- Website: Haihau.Namdinh.gov.vn; Haihau.Namdinh.dcs.vn

Hải Hậu [ha̰ːj˧˩˧:hə̰ʔw˨˩] is a former rural district of Nam Định province in the Red River Delta region of Vietnam.

== Geography ==
Hải Hậu is divided into 34 commune-level subdivisions.

- 3 townships : Cồn, Thịnh Long, Yên Định (capital).
- 31 communes : Hải An, Hải Anh, Hải Bắc, Hải Châu, Hải Chính, Hải Cường, Hải Đông, Hải Đường, Hải Giang, Hải Hà, Hải Hòa, Hải Hưng, Hải Lộc, Hải Long, Hải Lý, Hải Minh, Hải Nam, Hải Ninh, Hải Phong, Hải Phú, Hải Phúc, Hải Phương, Hải Quang, Hải Sơn, Hải Tân, Hải Tây, Hải Thanh, Hải Triều, Hải Trung, Hải Vân, Hải Xuân.

=== Topography ===
The district covers an area of 227 km^{2}.

=== Population ===
As of 2003 the district had a population of 285,298.

== See also ==
- Giao Thủy district
- Nghĩa Hưng district
- Xuân Trường district
