= Nam Định province =

- Province
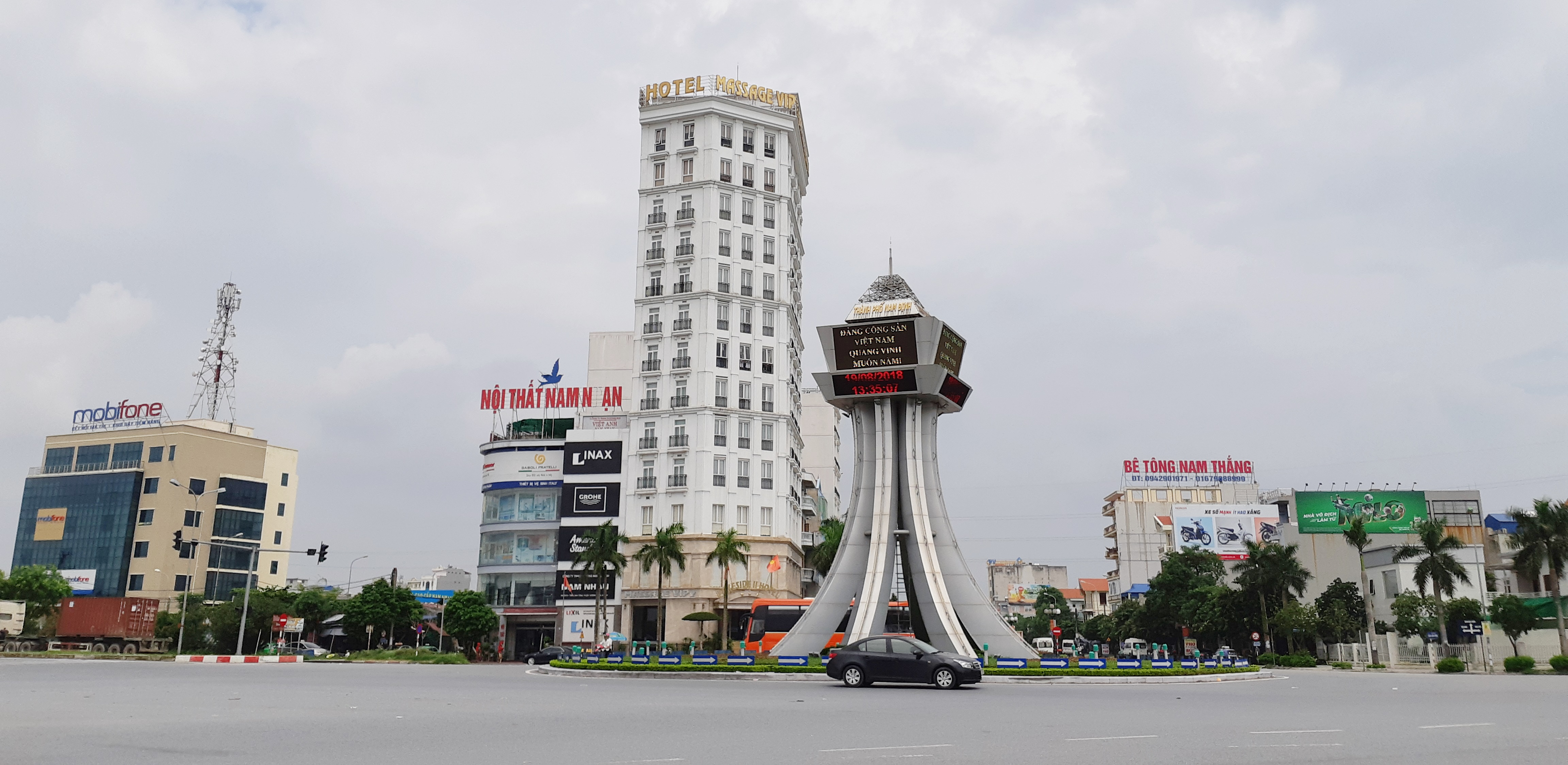
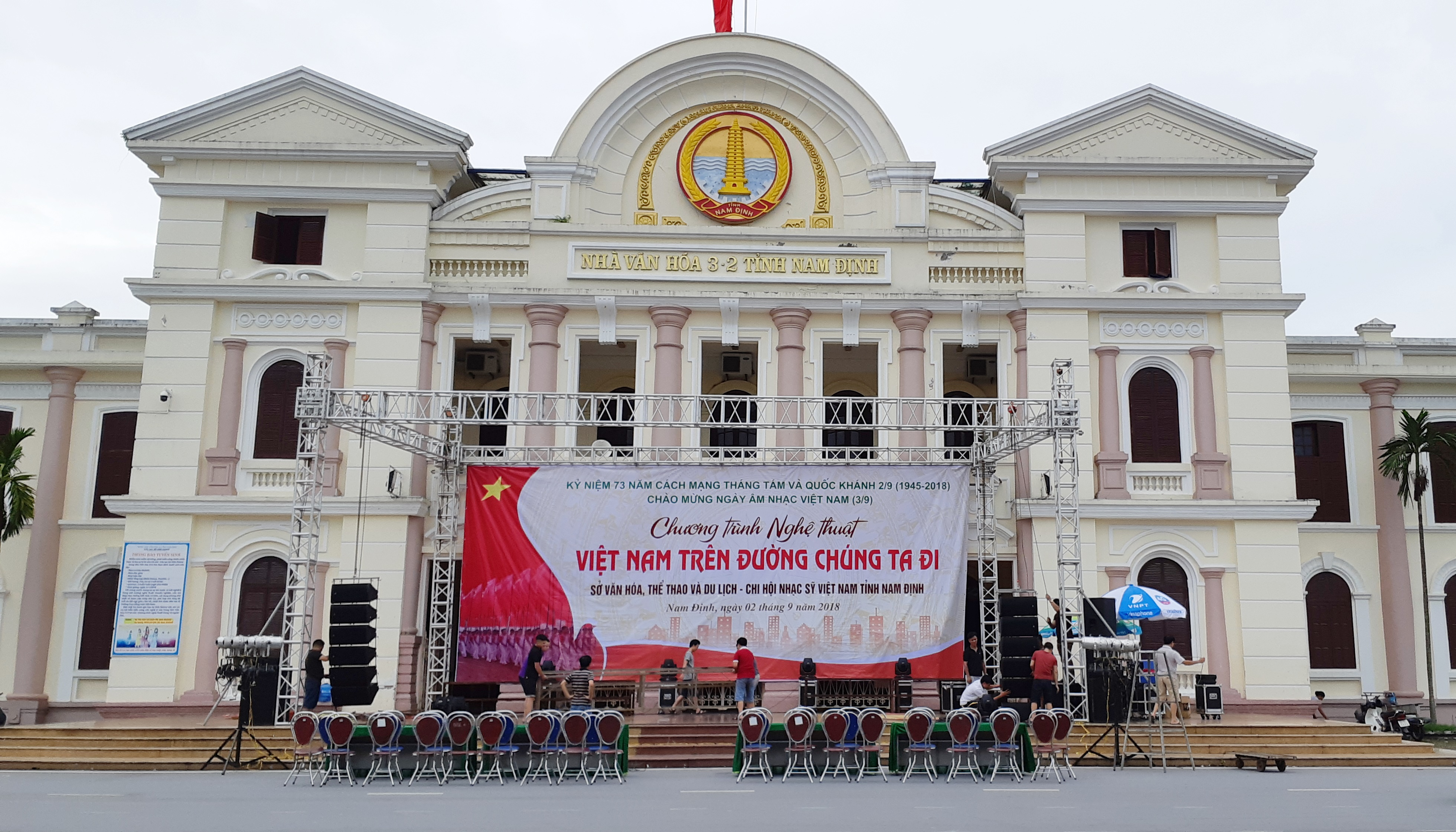
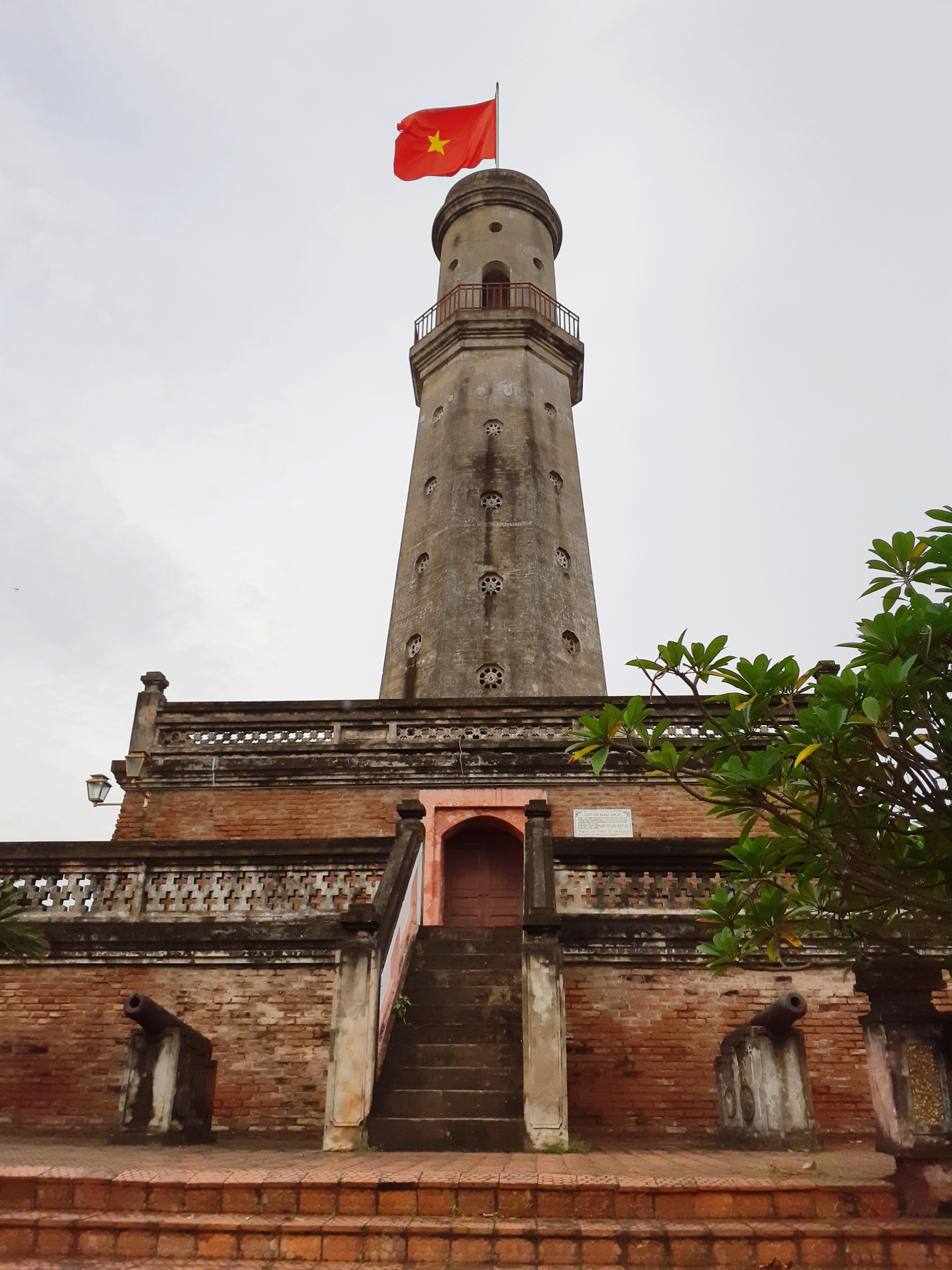
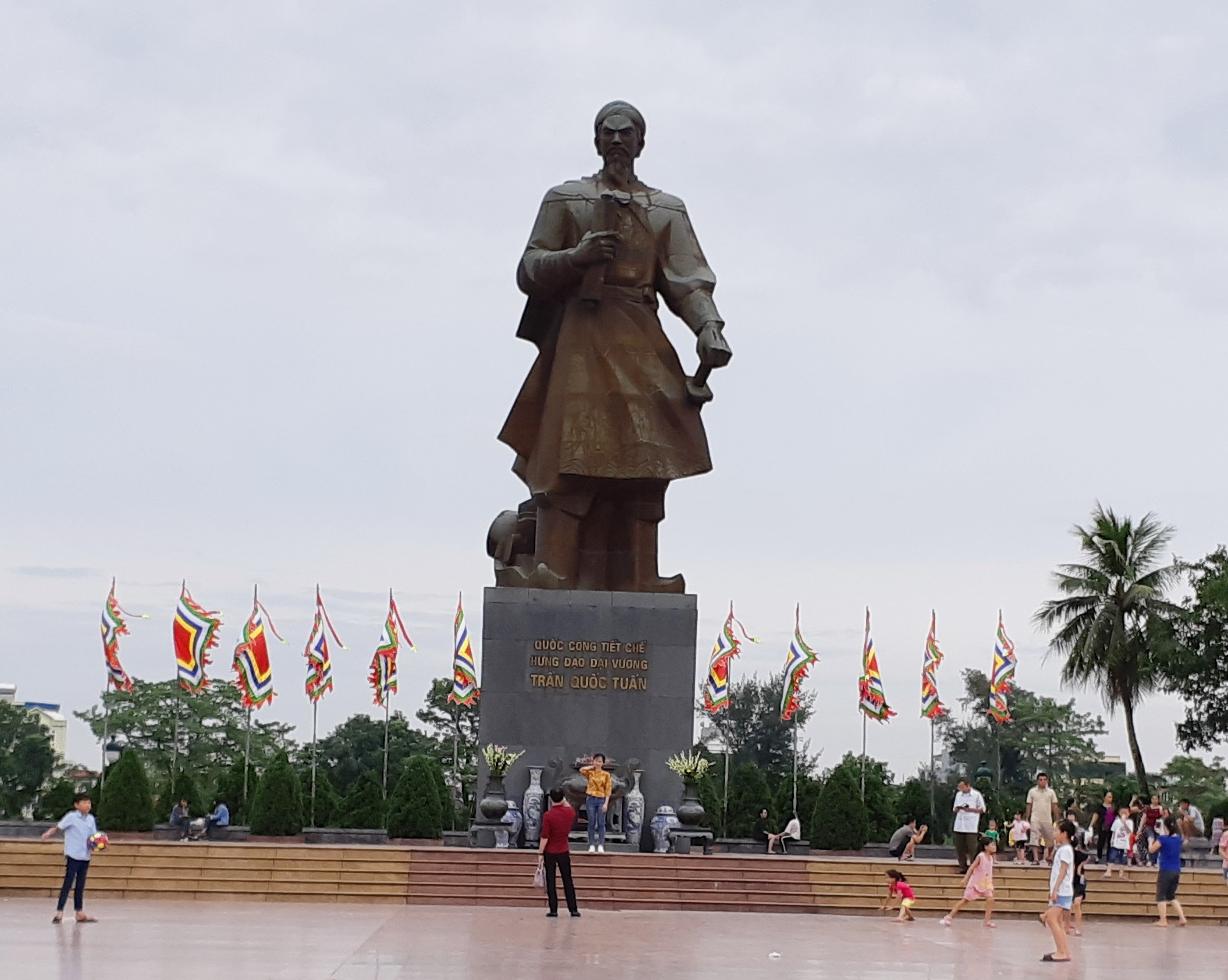
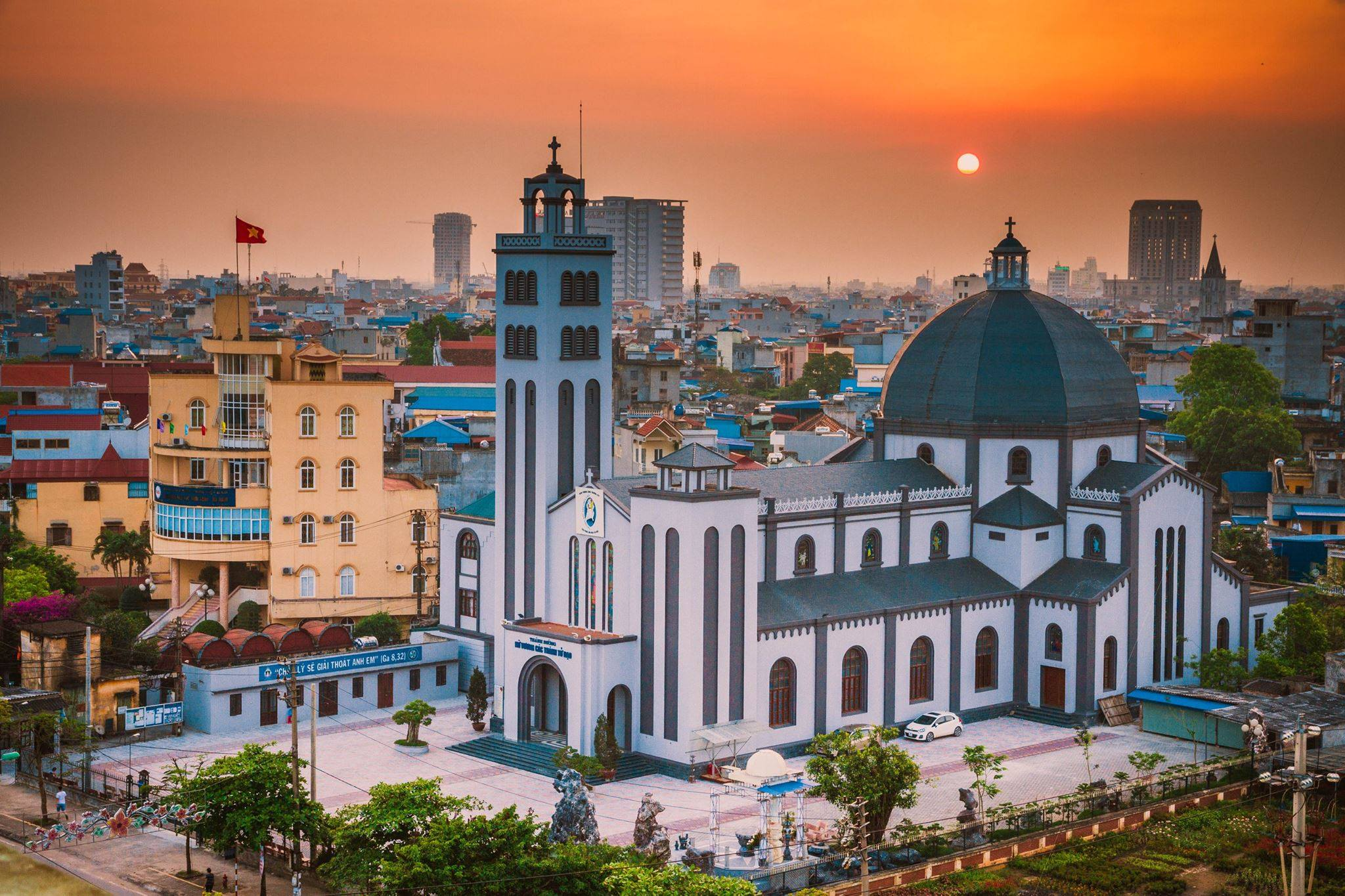
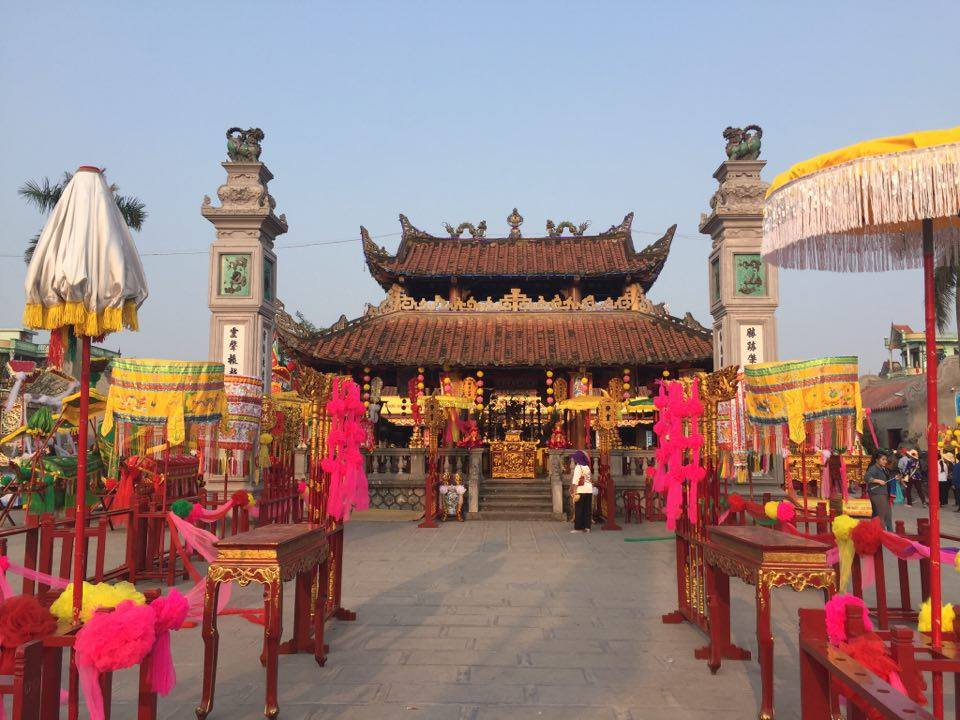
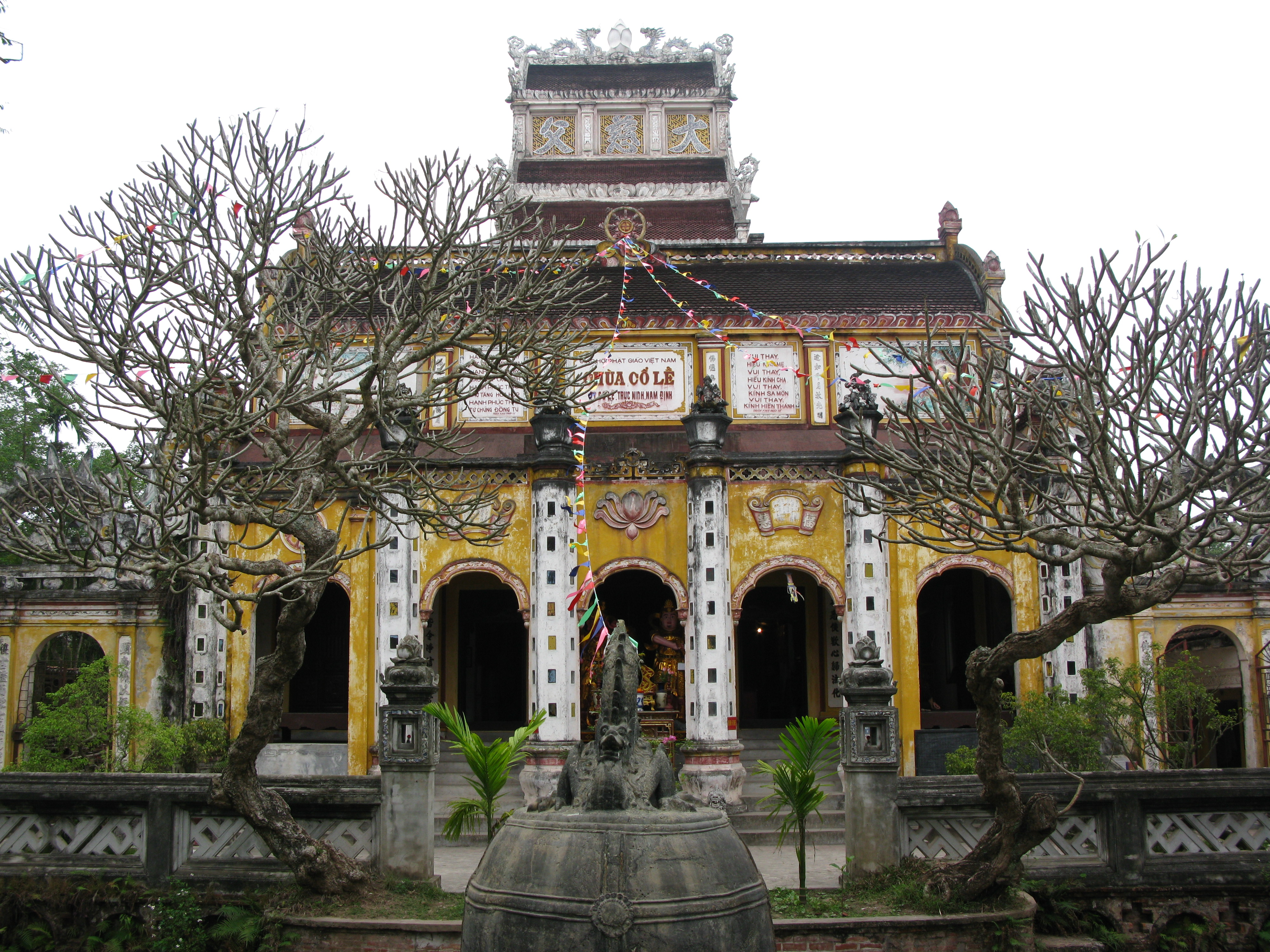
- Clockwise from top : Nam Định city gate, Flag tower of Nam Định, Nam Định 3-2 Culture House, statue of Trần Hưng Đạo, Khoái Đồng church, Dầy Temple, Cổ Lễ Temple.

- Seal
- Nickname: "Côi Hill and Vị River" (Non Côi Sông Vị, 孤山洧川)
- Motto: "To build a prosperous and powerful country" (Đắp xây non nước phú cường)
- Location of Nam Định within Vietnam.
- Coordinates: 20°15′N 106°15′E
- Country: Vietnam
- Region: Red River Delta
- Establishment: 1831
- Central hall: No.57, Vị Hoàng street, Nam Định city

Government
  - People Committee's Chairman: Phạm Đình Nghị
  - People Council's Chairman: Lê Quốc Chỉnh
  - Front Committee's Chairman: Trần Minh Thắng
  - Party Committee's Secretary: Đặng Khánh Toàn

Area
  - Total: 1,668.83 km^{2} (644.34 sq mi)

Population (2025)
  - Total: 2,262,891
  - Density: 1,355.97/km^{2} (3,511.96/sq mi)

Demographics
  - Ethnicities: Kinh; Hoa; Tanka; Mường; Tày; Nùng

GDP
  - Total: VND 58.736 trillion US$ 2.551 billion
- Time zone: UTC+7 (ICT)
- Area codes: 228
- ISO 3166 code: VN-67
- Vehicle registration: 18
- HDI (2020): ▲0.708 (32th)
- Website: Namdinh.gov.vn; Namdinh.dcs.vn

Nam Định ([nām ɗîɲˀ]) was a former province in the southern part of the Red River Delta region of Northern Vietnam.

On June 12, 2025, Nam Định, along with Hà Nam, was incorporated into Ninh Bình province.

== History ==
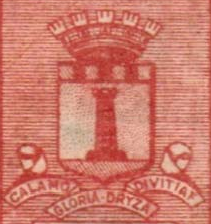
Former coat of arms of Namdinh City.

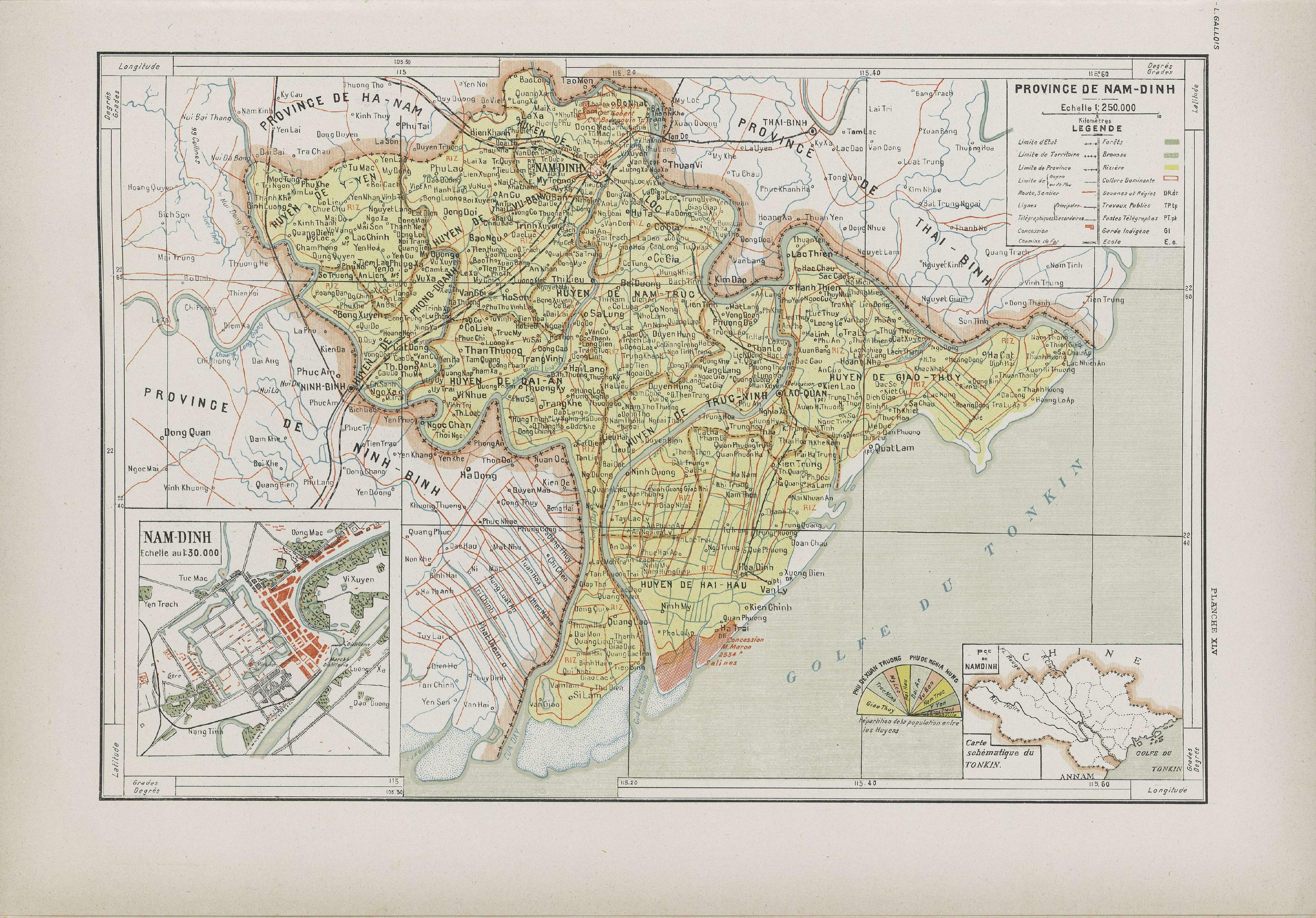
Map of Nam Dinh province in 1909

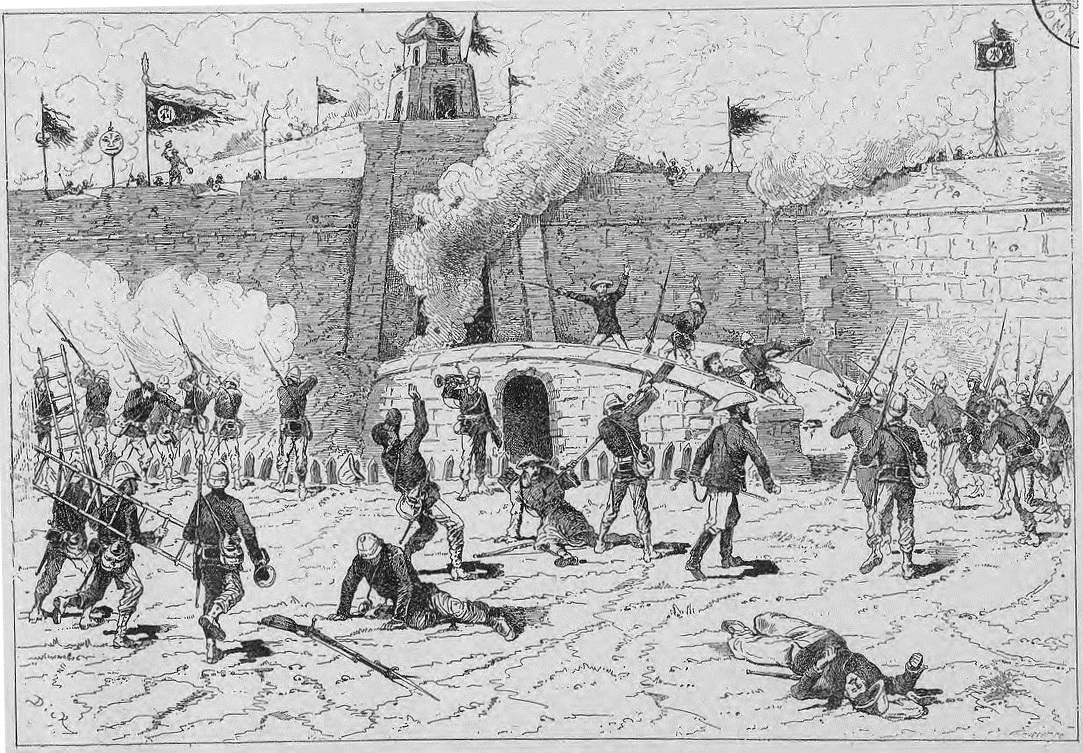
Capture of Nam Định, 1883

Nam Định province's borders Ninh Bình province to the southwest, Hà Nam province to the northwest, Thái Bình province to the northeast, and the Gulf of Tonkin to the southeast. As of 2022, it is the 52nd largest province by area and the 13th most populous province of Vietnam. Vân Cù village, Nam Định is the place of origin of Phở.

It has been one of the most important regions of Vietnam throughout its history because it is located on the Red River Delta. It is the birthplace of many famous Vietnamese historical figures, most notably Trần Hưng Đạo. It is also said to be the place where the Vietnamese dish Phở came from.

== Geography ==
Nam Định is subdivided into 9 district-level sub-divisions :

- 1 central-level city : Nam Định (capital).
- 9 rural districts : Giao Thủy, Hải Hậu, Nam Trực, Nghĩa Hưng, Trực Ninh, Vụ Bản, Xuân Trường, Ý Yên.

Besides, they are further subdivided into 15 commune-level towns (or townlets), 194 communes, and 20 wards.

=== Topography ===
Nam Định province can be divided into three regions:

The low-lying delta region, comprising Vụ Bản district, Ý Yên district, Nam Trực district, Trực Ninh district, and Xuân Trường district. This region has a high level of agriculture and textile and manufacturing industries.

The lowland coastal region, which is home to Giao Thủy, Hải Hậu, and Nghĩa Hưng districts. Nam Định's coastline is 72 kilometres (45 mi) long and has favorable conditions for raising livestock and fishing. Xuân Thủy National Nature Reserve is located in this region.

The Central region, where Nam Định is located, is supported through textile and garment industries, mechanical and processing industries, and traditional trades. Along with a general services sector, there is a growing professional sector as well. Nam Định is at the center of Vietnam's growing textile and trade gateway to the south via the Red River Delta.

Nam Định has four major estuaries: Ba Lạt, Đáy, Lạch Giang and Hà Lạn.

=== Climate ===
Like most other provinces in the North Delta region, Nam Định has a humid subtropical climate. The average annual temperature ranges from 23 to 24 °C (73 to 75 °F). The coldest months are December and January, with average temperatures ranging from 16 to 17 °C (61 to 63 °F) and the hottest month being July, with temperatures over 29 °C (84 °F). The average annual rainfall is between 1,750 and 1,800 millimetres (69 and 71 in) per year, divided into two distinct seasons: the rainy season from May to October, and the non-rainy, or less rainy, season from November to February. The total number of hours of sunlight per year averages out about 1,650 to 1,700 hours per year, and the average relative humidity is 80 to 85 percent. Additionally, being next to the Gulf of Tonkin, Nam Định is normally affected by tropical storms and monsoons, with an average of four to six storms per year.

== Culture ==
=== Education ===
Nam Định province is well known in Vietnam for its traditional education system and schools. Nam Định has several Universities and Colleges. Lê Hồng Phong High School is one of the top ranked high schools in all of Vietnam. Other top schools in Nam Định are Giao Thủy A High School, Trần Hưng Đạo High School, Nguyễn Khuyến High School, and Hải Hậu A, which were all in Vietnam's top 200 schools (National High School Standards - 2003). Nam Định has 16 schools in the top 200 (as of 2003), in addition to five schools in Vietnam's top 100 schools of 2009.

List of Universities and Colleges :

- Nam Dinh University of Nursing (Trường Đại học Điều dưỡng Nam Định)
- University Technical Economics Nam Dinh (Trường Đại học Kinh tế Kỹ thuật Nam Định)
- Nam Dinh University of Technology Education (Trường Đại học Sư phạm Kỹ thuật Nam Định)
- Luong the Vinh University (Trường Đại học Lương Thế Vinh)
- Nam Dinh College of Education

=== Religion ===
The main religions in Nam Định province are đạo Mẫu (a folk religion originated in the province in the 16th century), Buddhism (especially Zen school during the Trần dynasty), and Catholicism (part of the Hanoi Archdiocese and the whole of Bùi Chu Diocese).

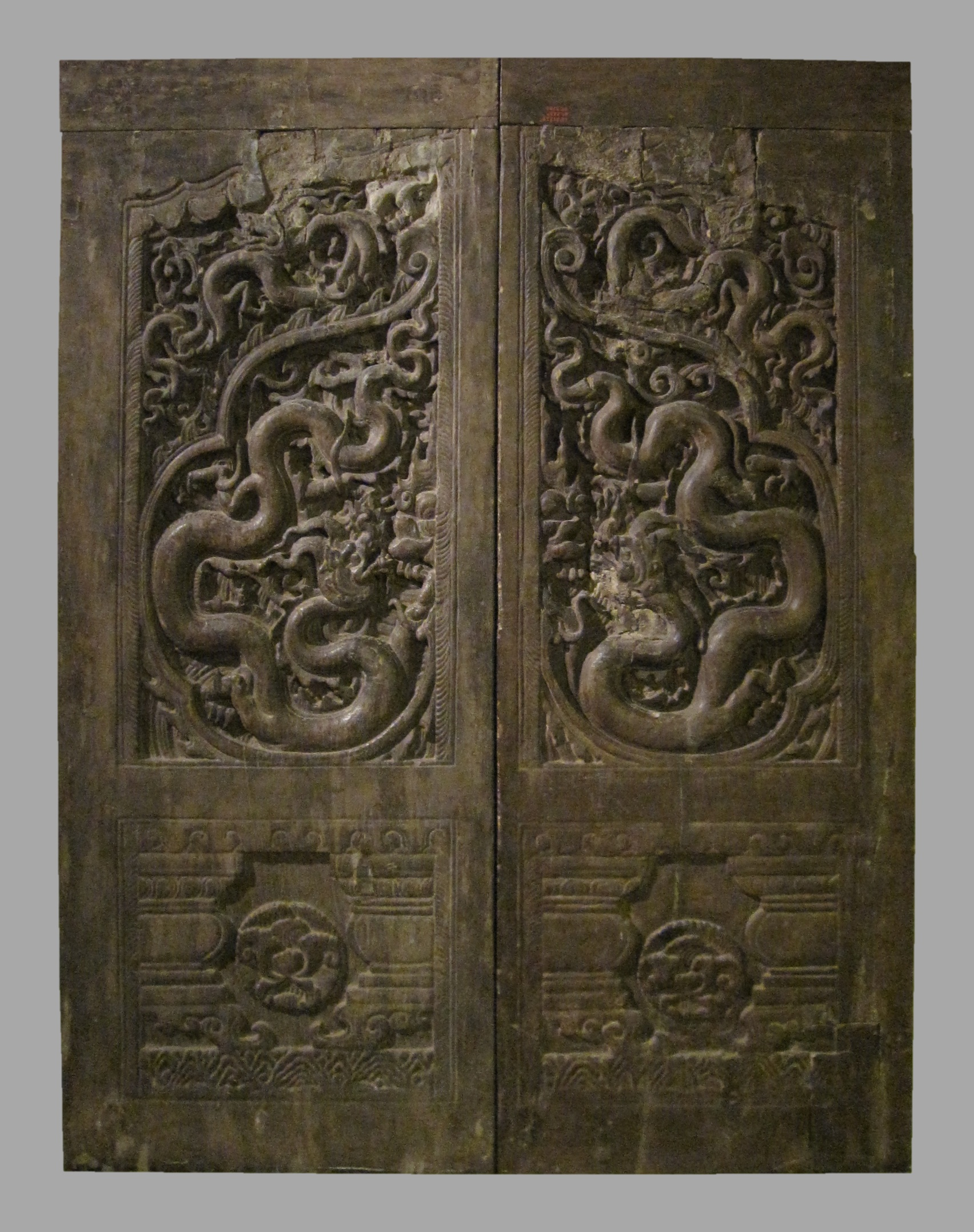
Carved wooden doors from the Phổ Minh Temple, Nam Định province (13th-14th century)

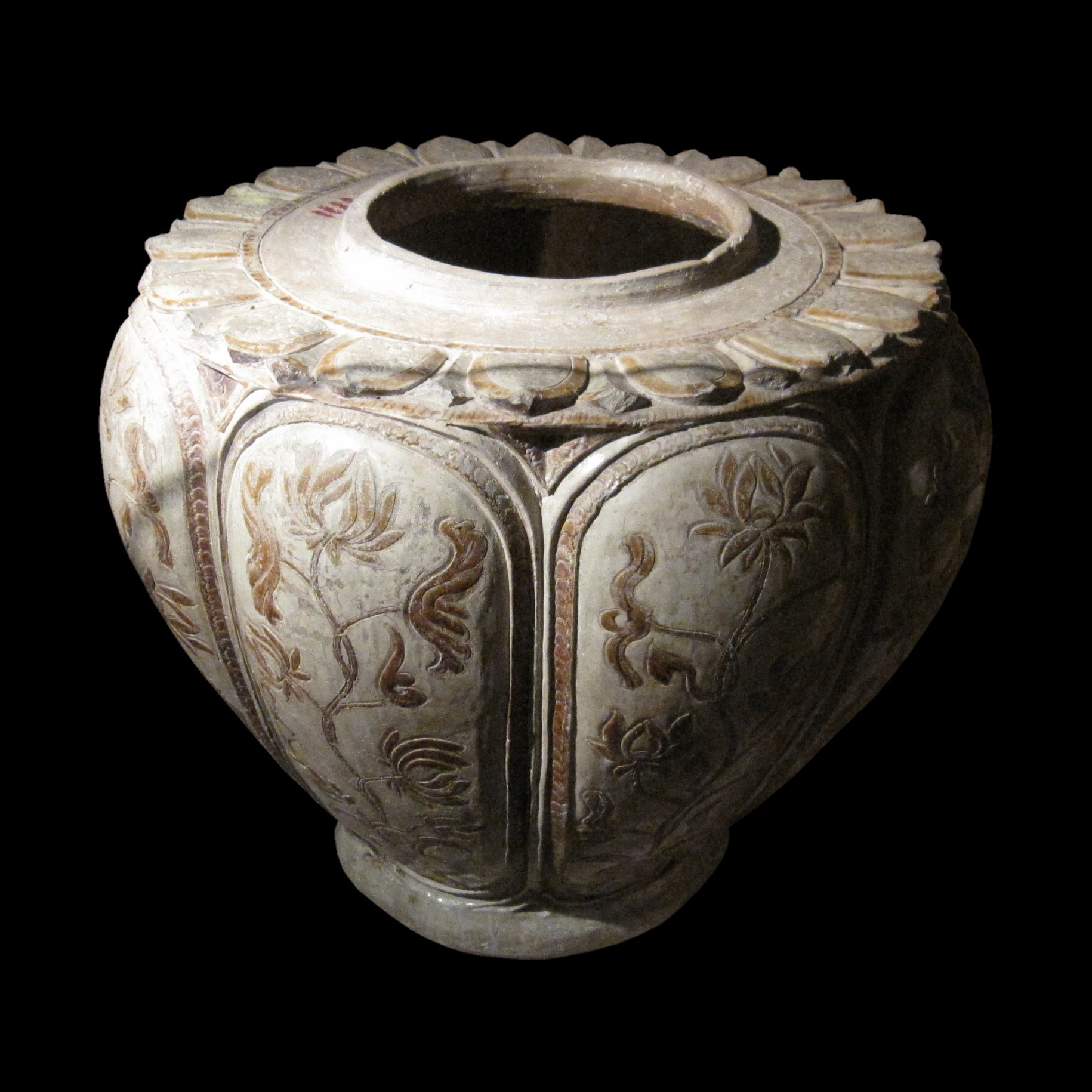
Patterned brown glazed ceramic jar with lotus and chrysanthemum motifs from Nam Định province (13th-14th century)

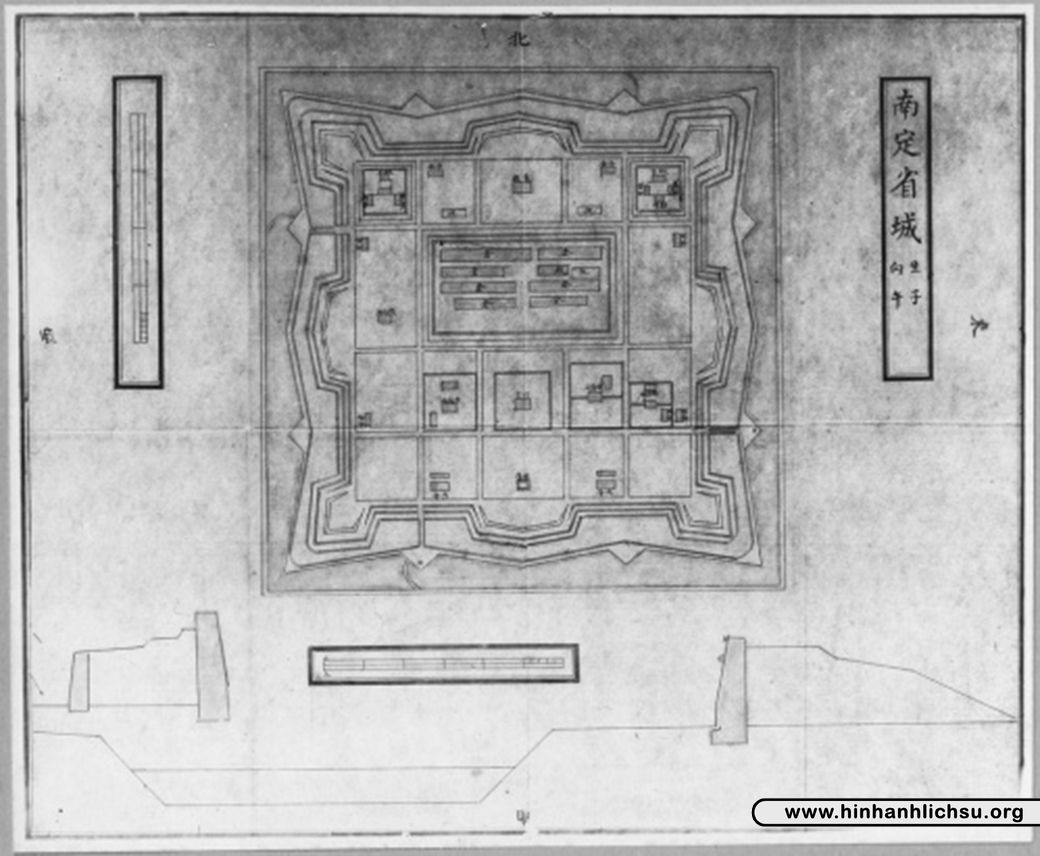
Drawing of Nam Định citadel in the Nguyễn dynasty

== Economy ==
In 2000, the estimated provincial gross domestic product reached US$400,000 (5.92 billion đồngs). In 2005, the economy structure was as follows: agriculture, forestry and fishing 41 per cent; industrial and construction 21.5 per cent; services 38 per cent.

=== Industrial zones ===
- Hòa Xá Industrial Zone: Located in Nam Định with a total area of 808 acres (3.27 km^{2}). The total estimated investment is about US$18.76 billion, with approximately 86 investment projects.
- Mỹ Trung Industrial Park: Located in Mỹ Lộc District and Lộc Hạ Ward, in the city of Nam Định, bordering National Highway 10. This area is still under development, with a total area of 370 acres (1.5 km^{2}) but can be expanded up to 470 acres (1.9 km^{2}). The total expected investment is approximately US$16.2 – 19 million (300-350 billion VND).
- Thành An Industrial Park: Located in the colonial part of Nam Định and Tân Thành - Vụ Bản, which borders National Highway 10 and connecting roads from National Highway 10 to Road 21, which leads to the port of Hải Thịnh and other southern districts of the province. Thành An Industrial Park can expand their planning up to 370 acres (1.5 km^{2}). The total investment for Thành An is approximately US$19 – 21.6 million (350-400 billion VND).
- Bảo Minh Industrial Park: Belongs to Vụ Bản District in Nam Định, located south of the National Highway 10 and approximately 10 kilometres (6.2 mi) from Nam Định. Bảo Minh Industrial Park is 494 acres (2.00 km^{2}) and has a total investment of US$16.2 – 21.6 million (300–400 billion VND).
- Hồng Tiến Industrial Park: Located just 25 kilometres (16 mi) away from Nam Định, in Ý Yên District, its convenient location has it settled next to the National Highway 10, 6 kilometres (3.7 mi) away from Binh Bình (which is close to Ninh Phúc Port), and also along the North-South National railway. The total area of Hồng Tiến is about 620 acres (2.5 km^{2}). This industrial park was first setup as an investment infrastructure for Vietnam Petroleum Corporation.
- Ninh Cơ Industrial Park: Located along the Ninh Cơ River, it is approximately 500 ha, which includes seaports, ship building, industrial engineering, import and export processing and transporting, and tourism services along the river in two districts (Hải Hậu and Nghĩa Hưng). Ninh Cơ Industrial Park is operated by VINASHIN Shipbuilding Company.

== See also ==
- Hà Nam Ninh province
- Nam Hà province
