= Nam Định (city) =

Nam Định City Thành phố Nam Định Thành Nam
- Provincial city (Class-1)
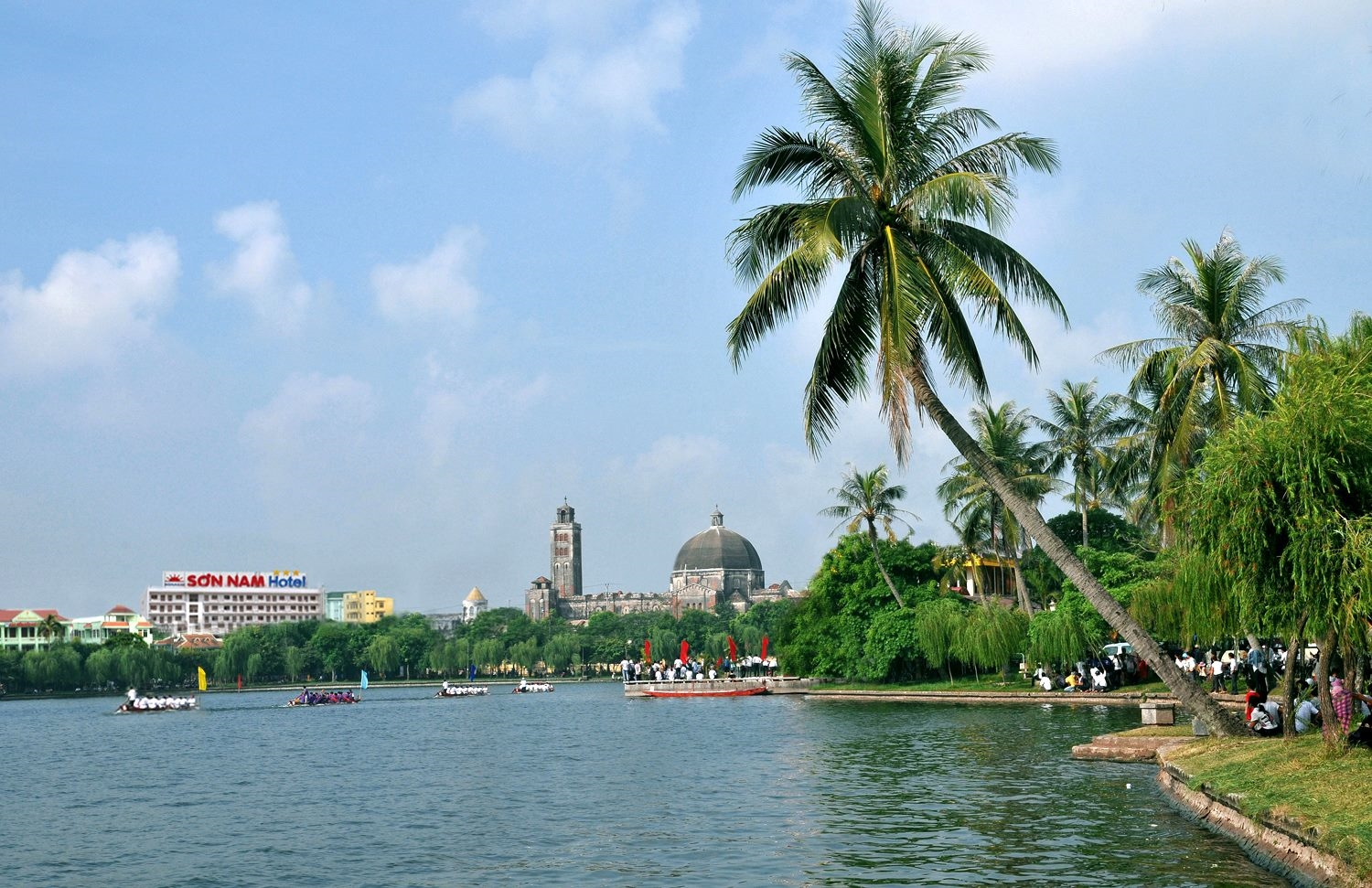
- Landscape of Vị Xuyên Lake.
- Nickname(s): "Textilepolis" (Thành-phố dệt)
- Motto(s): "To build a prosperous and powerful country" (Đắp-xây non-nước phú-cường)
- Location within Vietnam
- Coordinates: 20°25′12″N 106°10′06″E
- Country: Vietnam
- Region: Red River Delta
- Establishment: October 17, 1921
- Central hall: No.10, Trần Đăng Ninh road, Bà Triệu ward, Nam Định city

Government
  - Type: Municipality
  - People Committee's Chairman: Nguyễn Tiến Dũng
  - People Council's chairman: Nguyễn Anh Tuấn
  - Front Committee's chairman: Hoàng Quang Khoa
  - Party Committee's Secretary: Nguyễn Anh Tuấn

Area
  - Provincial city (Class-1): 195.39 km^{2} (75.44 sq mi)

Population (2022)
  - Provincial city (Class-1): 448,225
  - Density: 2,294.0/km^{2} (5,941.4/sq mi)
  - Urban: 364,181
  - Metro: 84,045
  - Ethnicities: Kinh; Tanka; Tày; Nùng
- Time zone: UTC+7 (Indochina Time)
- ZIP code: 420000
- Climate: Cwa
- Website: Thanhpho.Namdinh.gov.vn; Thanhpho.Namdinh.dcs.vn

Nam Định (Vietnamese pronunciation: [naːm˧˧:ɗḭ̈ʔŋ˨˩]) was the capital city of Nam Định province in the Red River Delta of the Northern Vietnam. As part of the 2025 Vietnamese administrative reform, all district-level subdivisions, including Nam Định, were abolished. The former city now corresponds with Đông A, Nam Định, Thành Nam, Thiên Trường and Trường Thi wards of Ninh Bình province.

== History ==
From August 18–20 of each year, there is a festival held in Nam Định called the Cố Trạch. This celebration honors General Trần Hưng Đạo, a 13th-century national hero who led Annamese forces to victory over the invading Mongols.

=== Middle Ages ===
Before the Trần dynasty, the land of modern Namdinh City of a northern area of an area was called as Hiển-khánh district, which corresponds to half of the modern area of Nam Định province. This was the intersection of three large rivers, so it was very convenient for trade.

The name of the city, under Trần dynasty, was Thiên Trường (天長) meant "where the Sky remains for Eternity". It is first mentioned to mark the birth of the city in 1262 by Emperor Trần Thái Tông. The name Thiên Trường was probably the name for a whole phủ, which at the time would be equivalent to a special prefecture or province nowadays. Under the Trần dynasty the city was considered to be the second capital, besides Thăng Long.

Under Lê dynasty, the city belonged to the Prefecture of Sơn Nam (山南), meant "Southern Mountains" or "to the South of the Mountains" in 1466 by Emperor Lê Thánh Tông, and Sơn Nam Hạ (山南下), meant "The South Prefecture of the Southern Mountains" in compared to Sơn Nam Thượng (山南上), meant "The North Prefecture of the Southern Mountains".

=== 20th century ===
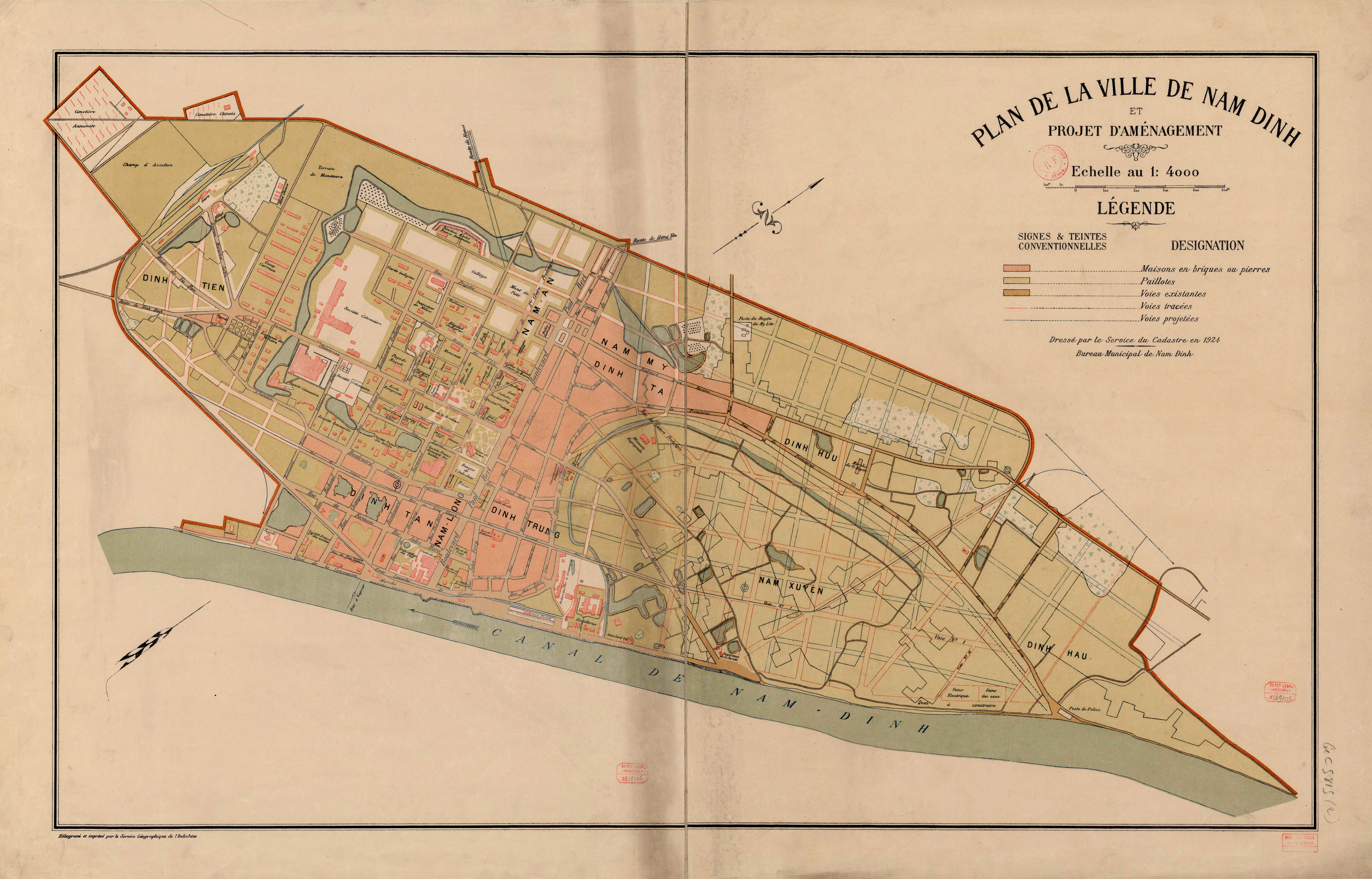
Map of Namdinh City in 1924

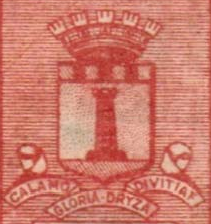
Coat of arms of Namdinh City (c. 1930)

The modern name of the city, Nam Định (南定), literally means "The pacified South", was first mentioned in 1831 under the reign of Emperor Minh Mệnh of the Nguyễn dynasty as the capital of Nam Định Province. In international context, the name of this urban area is often signed as Namdinh City (in English) or la ville de Namdinh (in French).

=== 21st century ===
According to a resolution announced by 2021 and officially applied by 2023, the entire Mỹ Lộc rural district area was merged into Nam Định City.

== Culture ==
Namdinh City's long-standing customs come from the intersection of three groups of people: Kinh, Hoa and French.

=== Landscapes ===
Namdinh City's oldest space is often divided by tourism researchers into two parts : The North is the settlement surrounding Vị Xuyên Lake and Dragon Market, which is called Namdinh Old Town (Nam-định lão-nhai); the South is a textile industry planned by the French from the 1880s, which is now called Hòa-vượng New Urban Complex (khu đô-thị Hòa-vượng).

- Trần Temple, a historical temple worshipping Emperors, Generals of Trần dynasty. It traces the 13th history of Annam with three Mongol invasions.
- Phổ Minh Pagoda, a Buddhist pagoda built under Ly Dynasty in 11th century. This temple still well preserved its original architecture from 11th and 12th century AD.
- Grand Church of Nam Định, a Christian church built in 19th century under French Indochina colonial period.
- Church of Khoái Đồng, a Romanesque Christian Church built in 1941 by the Spanish Santo Domingo Order.

Besides : 3–2 Square, Canton Temple, Doraemon Lane (previously River Resettlement hamlet), Đò-Quan Bridge, Đầu-mom Hamlet, Gốc-Mít Lane, Hakka Temple, Hoàng-văn-Thụ Street (previously Hải-phòng Road), Lê-hồng-Phong High School, Mả-lạng Area, Mỹ-tho Market, Namdinh Cheo Theatre, Ngõ-Ngang Market, Phù-long Market, Teochew Temple, Statue of Hưng-đạo Prince, Truyền-thống Lake, Trường-chinh Avenue (previously Giải-phóng Road and Lò-trâu Slope), Poet Tú-Xương's House and Tomb, Vọng-cung Temple...

=== Cuisine ===
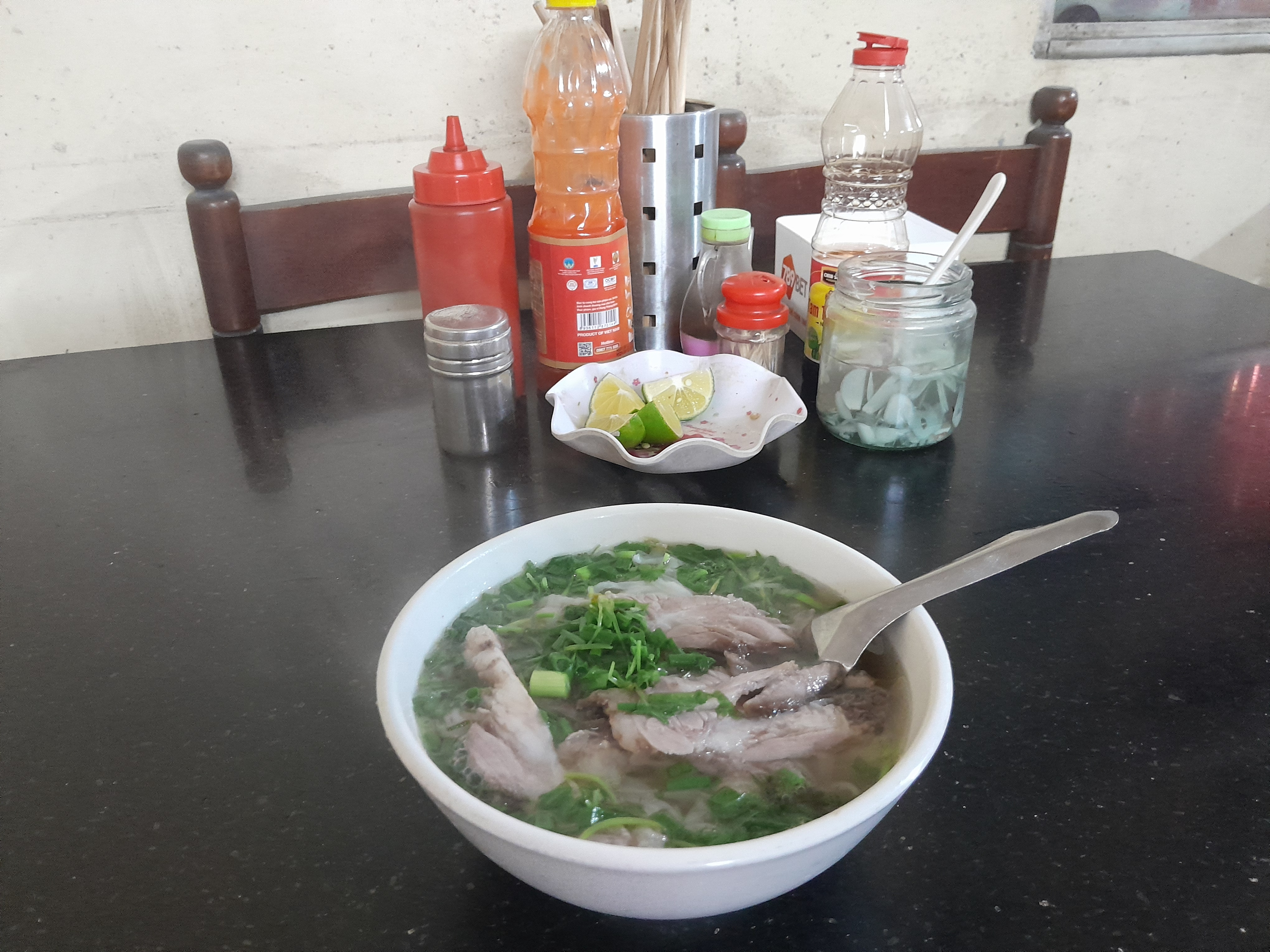
Nam Định–style beef pho

Namdinh City is often considered as the birthplace of pho by the majority. However, this dish is considered the best what only exists in Nguyễn Du, Hàng Sắt and Hàng Thao Streets. All of them are close to the 3–2 Square. Pho has some esoteric formulas stored by the descendants of the Teochew families. The noodles of Namdinh's pho are thought to always be as thin as clouds and they even can dissolve at the tip of the tongue, while the broth must smell the cow's bone and onion.

Namdinh is also known as the only place in Vietnam that can produce Polka Bread (bánh-mì Ba-lan) since 1969 until present. This is a type of boat-shaped bread but has a very thick intestine. It is baked in a special type of polish oven, which has been provided with an exclusive patent globally secret.

Fish sauce in Namdinh City is also different from many localities in Vietnam. It is usually mixed with boiled water from the cow's bone. This method will make the fish sauce lose the smell and become fragrant like peppermint. Besides, there are shrimp sauce (mắm tôm & mắm tép), which is used to wake the taste of boiled vegetables.

Some other specialties of Namdinh City : Bánh cuốn, bánh mì pa-tê, bánh gối, toast with honey, fish bún (fried rohu, snake-head or catfish is served with tomato broth and sliced lettuce & spinach), bún đũa, xôi (xôi vò, xôi khúc, xôi đỗ đen), bánh bèo (rice flour is wrapped by seaweed leaves, with water fat and roasted onion), Seochew sweet (kẹo Sìu-châu)...

=== Sports ===
Nam Định has two sports facilities, Thiên Trường Stadium (formerly Cuối Stadium) and Trần Quốc Toản Indoor Stadium, which are host to football and volleyball matches. Both sports centers are located on Hùng Vương Street.

In 2024 the Nam Dinh F C won the V.League 1 championship for the first time in 39 years.

=== Notable people ===
Middle Ages

- Trần Quốc Tuấn (陳興道, 1228 – 1300), Trần dynasty royal prince, statesman and military commander.
- Trần Thái Tông (陳太宗, 1218 – 1277), first Emperor of Trần dynasty, the second Grand Emperor of Trần dynasty.
- Nguyễn Hiền (阮賢, 1234 – 1256), Vietnamese youngest trạng nguyên, achieved the highest score on highest level of the Imperial examination when he was only 13 years old, scholar, writer, politician.
- Lương Thế Vinh (梁世榮, 1441 – 1496), prominent Vietnamese mathematician, scholar, politician.
- Đào Sư Tích (陶師錫, 1350 – 1396), Vietnamese scholar, writer, politician.
- Khiếu Năng Tĩnh (叫能靜, 1835 – 1915), Vietnamese scholar, writer, educator.
- Trần Bích San (陳碧珊, 1840 – 1877), Vietnamese scholar, politician.
- Trần Tế Xương (1870–1907), or under pen name of Tú Xương, a Vietnamese famous writer, poet.

Modern era

- Trường Chinh (1907–1988), Vietnamese communist political leader, revolutionary and theoretician.
- Lê Đức Thọ (1911–1990), Vietnamese revolutionary general, diplomat, and politician. The first Asian to be awarded the Nobel Peace Prize, jointly with United States Secretary of State Henry Kissinger in 1973, but refused the award.
- Nguyễn Cơ Thạch (1921–1998), Vietnamese revolutionary, diplomat, and politician, one of the peace-maker of Paris Peace Accords.
- Phạm Văn Thuần (born 1992), Vietnamese footballer.
- Nguyễn Văn Dũng (born 1963), Vietnamese footballer and coach.
- Nguyễn Văn Sỹ (born 1971), Vietnamese footballer and coach.
- Chu Ngọc Anh (born 1989), Vietnamese footballer.
- Rafaelson or Nguyễn Xuân Son (born 1997), Vietnamese-Brazilian footballer.

Besides : Giác Hải, Đặng Phương Nam, Lương Kim Định, Hoàng Minh Chính, Đinh Thế Huynh, Đinh La Thăng, Nguyễn Cao Kỳ Duyên...

=== International relations ===
Sister towns and sister cities

- Hải Phòng
- Bắc Ninh
- Mỹ Tho
- Hà Nội
- Prato

== Geography ==
=== Topography ===
Starting from 00:00 on January 1, 2025, the area of Nam Định city was automatically divided into 21 commune-level administrative units by the Resolution of the City People's Committee.

- 14 wards : Cửa Bắc, Cửa Nam, Hưng Lộc, Lộc Hạ, Lộc Hòa, Lộc Vượng, Mỹ Xá, Nam Phong, Nam Vân, Năng Tĩnh, Quang Trung, Trần Hưng Đạo, Trường Thi, Vị Xuyên.
- 7 communes : Mỹ Hà, Mỹ Lộc, Mỹ Phúc, Mỹ Tân, Mỹ Thắng, Mỹ Thuận, Mỹ Trung.

The whole terrain of Nam Định city is almost flat, many locations are still lower than the sea level, thus they face many disadvantages when the rainy season comes. However, Nam Định is also known as the conformity of the three rivers, which is extremely convenient for waterway traffic, such as : Đào, Đáy, Hồng. In particular, Đào river was originally an artificial canal from the Trần Dynasty, then gradually expanded with the width equivalent to the other two rivers. Its name means "digging" in Vietnamese language. However, before the 20th century, it was still called Vị Hoàng river (洧黃川), which had been in a folk subconscious as the nickname of Nam Định city. Besides, it is also called customarily as "Accretion river" (sông Lấp). (Note: Poem Sông Lấp by Trần Tế Xương about the beginning of the 20th century.)

Nam Định is 90 km Southeast of Vietnam's capital, Hanoi. It is also known as the center of the Southern of the Red River Delta. Not only by its importance of politics and economy, but for the traffic.

- Provincial Internal Bus Route.
- Provincial Route 490 (or National Route 55).
- National Route 10.
- National Route 21A.
- National Route 21B.
- National Route 37.
- National Route 38B and Hồ Chí Minh Highway.
- North–South Railway.

Besides, Tân Đệ Riverport (bến phà Tân Đệ) has long been an important transport center of the Red River Delta, which can lead to the Tonkin Gulf.

=== Demography ===
According to the census in January 2023, the population of Nam Định city was about 364,181.

Due to the history of its formation very early, the area of Nam Định city has many ethnic groups settling together. Kinh people account for the majority, but besides that, there is Hoa communities settled in the Old Quarters for many generations. Although they have been registered as Hoa or Kinh since 1978, in the composition of many groups such as : Tanka, Hakka, Seochew, Teochew, Canton, Hokkien...

There is also a small community of Tày and Nùng who has been refugees due to the influence of the border conflict. Also since the 2000s, there were a number of other groups from the international community, who were naturalized after only a short time living here.

By preliminary statistics, at least 10% of Nam Định citizens are Catholic. Nam Định city was also one of the earliest Annamese location to receive the Gospel, which was about the beginning of the 19th century, by the Paris Missionary Association. The territory of old Nam Định city and former Mỹ Lộc rural district has previously belonged to two different dioceses, which were Hà Nội and Nam Định. However, since Christmas in 2024, expanded Nam Định city has become part of the Hanoi Diocese, belonging to the Hanoi Archdiocese. Their patron saint is Our Lady of Immacilization.

=== Climate ===
In September 2024, Nam Định experienced heavy flooding from severe rainfall that forced many residents to evacuate their homes.

Climate data for Nam Định
Month	Jan	Feb	Mar	Apr	May	Jun	Jul	Aug	Sep	Oct	Nov	Dec	Year
Record high °C (°F)	32.3 (90.1)	35.2 (95.4)	36.7 (98.1)	40.5 (104.9)	39.7 (103.5)	40.5 (104.9)	40.0 (104.0)	39.5 (103.1)	36.5 (97.7)	35.7 (96.3)	34.0 (93.2)	31.3 (88.3)	40.5 (104.9)
Mean daily maximum °C (°F)	19.6 (67.3)	20.2 (68.4)	22.5 (72.5)	27.0 (80.6)	31.3 (88.3)	33.0 (91.4)	33.0 (91.4)	32.0 (89.6)	30.8 (87.4)	28.7 (83.7)	25.4 (77.7)	21.8 (71.2)	27.1 (80.8)
Daily mean °C (°F)	16.5 (61.7)	17.4 (63.3)	19.9 (67.8)	23.8 (74.8)	27.4 (81.3)	29.1 (84.4)	29.4 (84.9)	28.6 (83.5)	27.4 (81.3)	25.0 (77.0)	21.7 (71.1)	18.1 (64.6)	23.7 (74.7)
Mean daily minimum °C (°F)	14.4 (57.9)	15.6 (60.1)	18.1 (64.6)	21.7 (71.1)	24.7 (76.5)	26.4 (79.5)	26.8 (80.2)	26.1 (79.0)	25.0 (77.0)	22.5 (72.5)	19.1 (66.4)	15.6 (60.1)	21.3 (70.3)
Record low °C (°F)	4.6 (40.3)	5.3 (41.5)	6.4 (43.5)	12.1 (53.8)	17.2 (63.0)	19.2 (66.6)	21.3 (70.3)	22.3 (72.1)	16.7 (62.1)	13.3 (55.9)	6.7 (44.1)	5.1 (41.2)	4.6 (40.3)
Average rainfall mm (inches)	27.3 (1.07)	27.4 (1.08)	50.4 (1.98)	85.7 (3.37)	175.9 (6.93)	192.1 (7.56)	240.2 (9.46)	298.5 (11.75)	315.4 (12.42)	202.3 (7.96)	66.1 (2.60)	27.0 (1.06)	1,701.4 (66.98)
Average rainy days	9.8	12.8	16.8	13.1	12.7	12.9	13.1	16.1	14.5	11.5	7.0	6.4	146.3
Average relative humidity (%)	84.6	87.6	89.5	88.6	84.4	82.0	81.8	85.2	85.1	83.0	81.9	81.7	84.6
Mean monthly sunshine hours	69.9	42.4	40.8	90.3	184.9	178.6	195.9	165.2	161.9	153.4	130.8	110.6	1,517.2
Source 1: Vietnam Institute for Building Science and Technology
Source 2: The Yearbook of Indochina, Nchmf.gov.vn (August record high)

== See also ==
- Hà Nam
- Hưng Yên
- Ninh Bình
- Thái Bình
