= Vị Khê =

Vị Khê Phường Vị Khê
- Ward
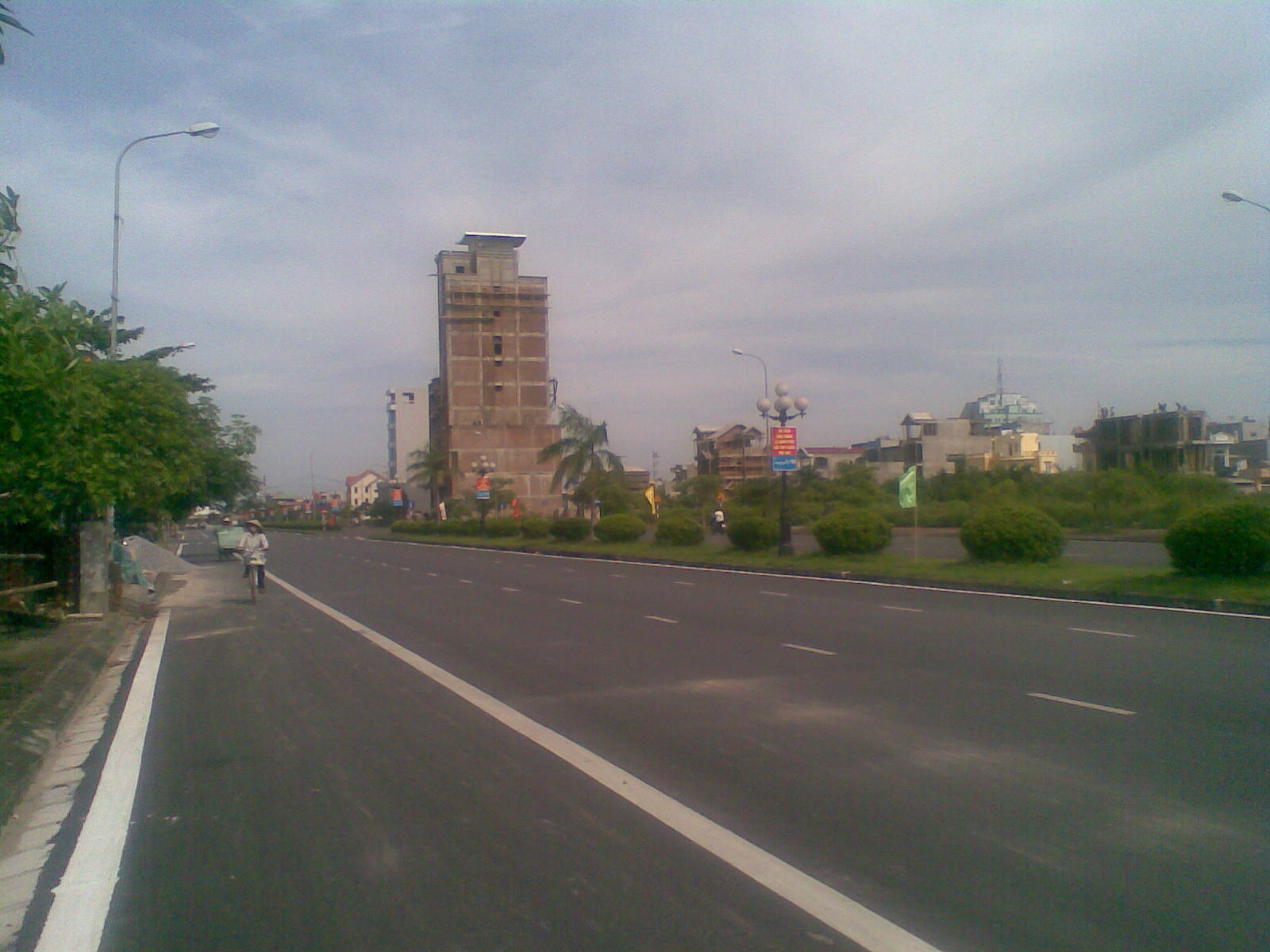
- View of Vị Khê Ward
- Interactive map of Vị Khê
- Location in Vietnam
- Country: Vietnam
- Regions: Red River Delta
- Province: Ninh Bình Province
- Established: June 16, 2025

Area
  - Total: 25.27 km^{2} (9.76 sq mi)

Population (2025)
  - Total: 36,210
  - Density: 1,433/km^{2} (3,711/sq mi)
- Time zone: UTC+07:00 (Indochina Time)

Vị Khê is a ward (phường) of Ninh Bình Province, Vietnam.

== Geography ==
Vị Khê Ward located in eastern Ninh Bình Province, and adjacent to:

- Thiên Trường Ward to the north
- Hồng Quang Ward and Nam Hồng Commune to the south
- Nam Định Ward to the west
- Hưng Yên Province to the east.

== History ==
On June 12, 2025, the National Assembly of Vietnam issued Resolution No. 202/2025/QH15 on the arrangement of provincial-level administrative units (effective from June 12, 2025). Accordingly, the entire land area and population of Hà Nam Province, Nam Định Province and Ninh Bình Province were merged to form a new province named Ninh Bình Province.

On June 16, 2025, the Standing Committee of the National Assembly of Vietnam issued Resolution No. 1674/NQ-UBTVQH15 on the arrangement of commune-level administrative units of Ninh Bình Province in 2025 (effective from June 16, 2025). Accordingly, the entire land area and population of Nam Điền Commune (Nam Trực District) and Nam Phong Ward (Nam Định City) were merged to form a new ward named Vị Khê Ward.
