= Trường Thi =

Trường Thi Phường Trường Thi
- Ward
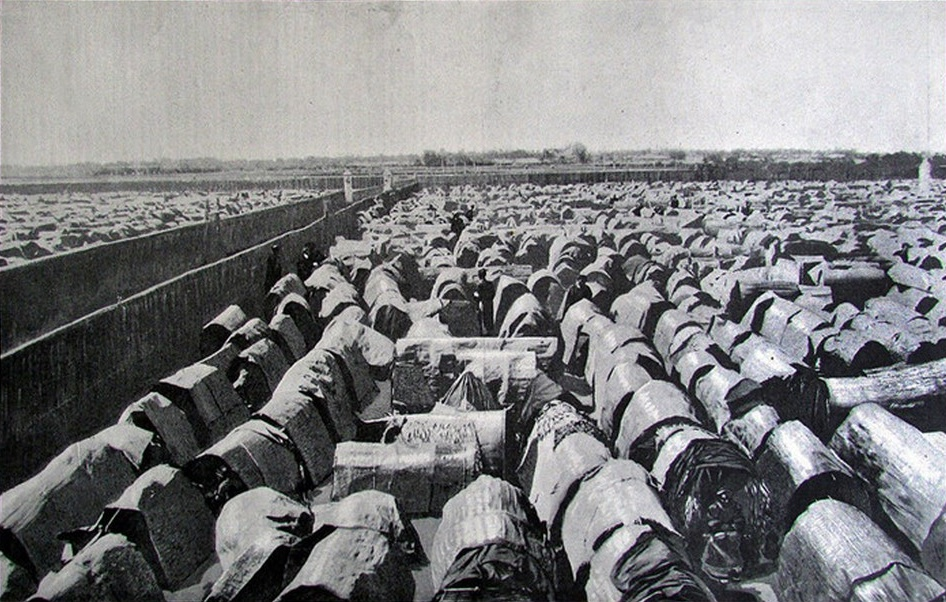
- Nam Định Examination Center
- Interactive map of Trường Thi
- Location in Vietnam
- Country: Vietnam
- Regions: Red River Delta
- Province: Ninh Bình Province
- Established: June 16, 2025

Area
  - Total: 31.50 km^{2} (12.16 sq mi)

Population (2025)
  - Total: 69,988
  - Density: 2,222/km^{2} (5,755/sq mi)
- Time zone: UTC+07:00 (Indochina Time)

Trường Thi is a ward (phường) of Ninh Bình Province, Vietnam.

== Geography ==
Trường Thi Ward located in eastern Ninh Bình Province, and adjacent to:

- Đông A Ward, Nam Định Ward and Thành Nam Ward to the north
- Liên Minh Ward to the south
- Hiển Khánh Commune and Vụ Bản Commune to the west
- Hồng Quang Ward and Nam Trực Commune to the east.

== History ==
On June 12, 2025, the National Assembly of Vietnam issued Resolution No. 202/2025/QH15 on the arrangement of provincial-level administrative units (effective from June 12, 2025). Accordingly, the entire land area and population of Hà Nam Province, Nam Định Province and Ninh Bình Province were merged to form a new province named Ninh Bình Province.

On June 16, 2025, the Standing Committee of the National Assembly of Vietnam issued Resolution No. 1674/NQ-UBTVQH15 on the arrangement of commune-level administrative units of Ninh Bình Province in 2025 (effective from June 16, 2025). Accordingly, the entire land area and population of Trường Thi Ward and Thành Lợi Commune were merged to form a new ward named Trường Thi Ward.
