= Hồng Quang =

Ward in Red River Delta, Vietnam

Hồng Quang Phường Hồng Quang
- Ward
- Interactive map of Hồng Quang
- Country: Vietnam
- Regions: Red River Delta
- Province: Ninh Bình Province
- Established: June 16, 2025

Area
  - Total: 27.53 km^{2} (10.63 sq mi)

Population (2025)
  - Total: 35,784
  - Density: 1,300/km^{2} (3,367/sq mi)
- Time zone: UTC+07:00 (Indochina Time)

Hồng Quang is a ward (phường) of Ninh Bình Province, Vietnam.

== Geography ==
Hồng Quang Ward located in eastern Ninh Bình Province, and adjacent to:

- Nam Định Ward and Vị Khê Ward to the north
- Nam Ninh Commune and Nam Trực Commune to the south
- Trường Thi Ward to the west
- Nam Hồng Commune to the east.

== History ==
On June 12, 2025, the National Assembly of Vietnam issued Resolution No. 202/2025/QH15 on the arrangement of provincial-level administrative units (effective from June 12, 2025). Accordingly, the entire land area and population of Hà Nam Province, Nam Định Province and Ninh Bình Province were merged to form a new province named Ninh Bình Province.

On June 16, 2025, the Standing Committee of the National Assembly of Vietnam issued Resolution No. 1674/NQ-UBTVQH15 on the arrangement of commune-level administrative units of Ninh Bình Province in 2025 (effective from June 16, 2025). Accordingly, the entire land area and population of Hồng Quang Commune (Nam Trực District), Nghĩa An Commune and Nam Vân Ward (Nam Định City) were merged to form a new ward named Hồng Quang Ward.
