= Trần Hanh =

Vietnamese air force pilot (1932–2024)

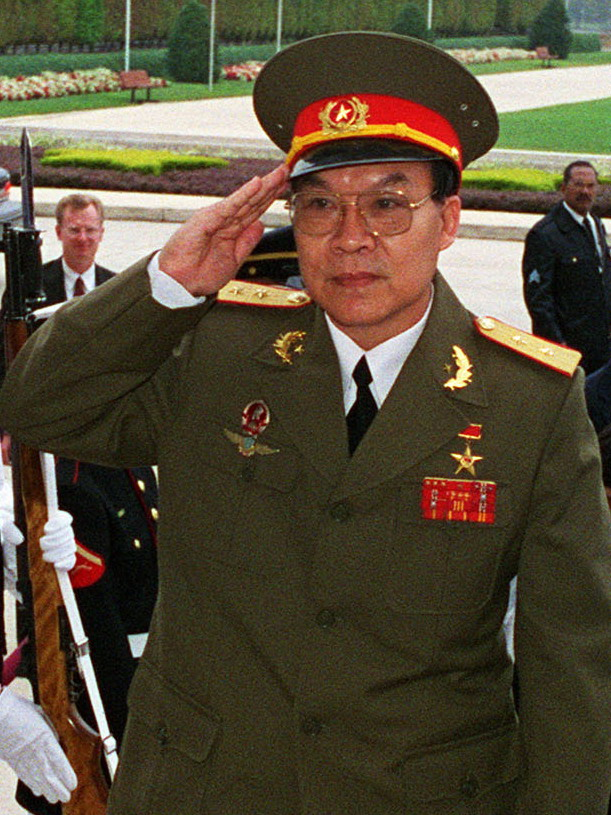
- Trần Hanh in 1998
- Born: November 29, 1932; Mỹ Lộc, Nam Định, Tonkin, French Indochina
- Died: December 5, 2024 (aged 92)
- Military career
- Allegiance: Vietnam
- Branch: Vietnam People's Air Force
- Service years: 1949–2000
- Rank: Lieutenant General
- Commands: Deputy Minister of Defence of Vietnam; Deputy Chief of the General Staff
- Conflicts: Vietnam War
- Awards: Hero of the People's Armed Forces Military Exploit Order

Lieutenant General Trần Hanh (November 29, 1932 – December 5, 2024) was a pilot of the Vietnam People's Air Force and later Deputy Minister of Defence of Vietnam. During the Vietnam War, Trần Hanh was a MIG-17 pilot and officer of the 921st Regiment who shot down an F-105D in April 1965. After the war he became the Deputy Chief of the General Staff and later Deputy Minister of Defence of Vietnam before his retirement in 2000.

== Early life ==
Trần Hanh, whose real name was Trần Huy Hanh, was born in 1932 to a poor family in Lộc Vượng commune, Mỹ Lộc, Nam Định. He began to participate in Youth Union in December 1946 and the revolutionary movement in April 1947.

== Career ==
Trần Hanh joined the Vietnam People's Army in September 1949 and became a student of the Lê Lợi School for Officers and later Nguyễn Huệ School in December 1950. In his early career, Trần Hanh often served as political commissar (chính trị viên) of various military units, he was appointed political commissar of the 23rd Company of 680th Battalion, 48th Regiment, 320th Division in February 1954 and afterwards deputy political commissar of the 680th Battalion in June 1954.

In September 1956, Trần Hanh was chosen to study to fly the Mikoyan-Gurevich MiG-17 in a school of People's Liberation Army Air Force in China. After four years studying, Trần Hanh became commander (đại đội trưởng) of the newly found 2nd Company of the Vietnam People's Air Force. In August 1964, Trần Hanh was appointed commander of the 1st Company, 921st Regiment (Sao Đỏ) of the Vietnam People's Air Force. On April 4, 1965, Trần Hanh shot down the F-105D No. 59-1754 of the 355th Fighter Wing near Ham Rong Bridge. Later this year, Trần Hanh participated in the formation of 4 MIG-17s that shot down a US helicopter over Hòa Bình in November. Trần Hanh was promoted to deputy commander (trung đoàn phó) in May 1965 and commander (trung đoàn trưởng) of this regiment in October 1969. In March 1972, he became the Deputy Commander (Tư lệnh phó) of the Vietnam People's Air Force, or the 371st Division at that time, two years later Trần Hanh held the position of Commander of the 371st Division.

After the war, Trần Hanh was appointed Deputy Chief of Staff (Tham mưu phó) of the Vietnam People's Air Force in August 1976. In January 1977 Trần Hanh was sent by the Politburo of the Communist Party of Vietnam to be the Secretary (Bí thư) of the Ho Chi Minh Communist Youth Union for a short time before returned to the Air Force as Deputy Commander in June 1977. Trần Hanh became the Commander of the Air Force in March 1986 and Deputy Chief of the General Staff (Phó Tổng tham mưu trưởng) of the Vietnam People's Army from April 1989 to October 1996. From November 1996 to December 1999 Trần Hanh was appointed to the position of Deputy Minister of Defence of Vietnam before retired in 2000. He was also deputy of the National Assembly of Vietnam and member of the Central Committee of the Communist Party of Vietnam. After he retired, Trần Hanh was elected to the General Secretary (Tổng thư ký) of the Vietnam War Veterans Association (Hội cựu chiến binh Việt Nam).

== Death ==
Trần died on December 5, 2024, at the age of 92. He was lie in state at the National Funeral Home on December 9, before was laid to rest at Chùa Tháp cemetery in Nam Định City.

== Rank and decorations ==
Trần Hanh was promoted to Major General (thiếu tướng) in 1984 and Lieutenant General (trung tướng) in 1989.

In 1967 Trần Hanh was awarded the prestigious title Hero of the People's Armed Forces (Anh hùng lực lượng vũ trang nhân dân). Further, he was bestowed various medals and decorations such as the 1st, 2nd and 3rd grade Military Exploit Order (Huân chương quân công), the 1st, 2nd and 3rd grade Medal of Glorious Soldier (Huân chương Chiến sỹ vẻ vang) or the Badge of Hồ Chí Minh (Huy hiệu Hồ Chí Minh).

== Notes ==
- Toperczer, István (2001). MiG-17 and MiG-19 Units of the Vietnam War. Osprey Publishing. ISBN 1-84176-162-1.
