= Ngô Vi Liễn =

Vietnamese scholar (b. 1894, d. 1945)

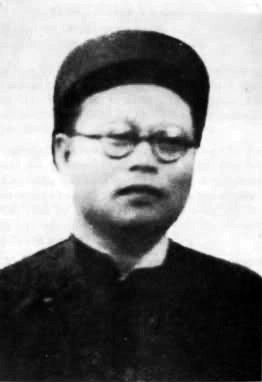

Personal details
- Born: 5 November 1894
- Died: 14 May 1945 (aged 50)

Ngô Vi Liễn (吳為璉, 5 November 1894 – 14 May 1945) was a Vietnamese mandarin, scholar and literary researcher.

Liễn was born on 5 November 1894 in Tả Thanh Oai village, Hà Đông province (now Tả Thanh Oai commune, Thanh Trì district, Hà Nội).

== Early life ==
Liễn was born into a Confucian family. He was educated in High School of the Protectorate, Thông ngôn school (interpretation school) and graduated from College of Jurisprudence in Hanoi.

From 1928 to 1939, he served as Tri huyện (governor of district), successively in Cẩm Giàng, Quỳnh Côi, Bình Lục and Võ Giàng. He collected information and compiled geographical books of these districts.

== Works ==
As a trained and passionate researcher, Liễn compiled 8 works and co-authored 3 other books. Especially when he served as a tri huyện (governor of a district), he conducted a comprehensive study of the places under his jurisdiction and completed three district geography books.

His works include:

- Địa dư huyện Bình Lục, Hà Nội, 1935
- Địa dư huyện Quỳnh Côi, Hà Nội, 1933
- Địa dư huyện Cẩm Giàng, Hà Nội, 1931
- Nomenclature des communes du Tonkin, Hà Nội, 1928
- Địa dư các tỉnh Bắc Kì, Hà Nội, 1927

== Memorial ==
In 2016, a street in Phủ Lý, Hà Nam Province was named "phố Ngô Vi Liễn" after him, un memory of this former governor of Bình Lục district, Hà Nam Province.
