= Bình Lục district =

Coordinates: 20.500°N 106.067°E

Bình Lục District Huyện Bình Lục
- District
- Seal
- Interactive map of Bình Lục District
- Country: Vietnam
- Region: Red River Delta
- Province: Hà Nam
- Capital: Bình Mỹ

Area
  - Total: 60 sq mi (155 km^{2})

Population (2003)
  - Total: 158,023
- Time zone: UTC+07:00 (Indochina Time)

Bình Lục is a former rural district of Hà Nam province in the Red River Delta region of Vietnam.

== History ==
Its name Bình Lục means "the flat land". However, it is also a Hanese phonetic way an older name : K'lu, B'lu, or Kẻ Lủ, Phù Lỗ. Its means "buffalo" in ancient Annamese language.

This rural district covers an area of 155 km^{2}. The district capital lies at Bình Mỹ town. As of 2003 the district had a population of 158,023.

According to the records of a number of indigenous officials and residents, the topography of Hà Nam province was lower than the sea level in the past, most of the swamps with many crocodiles. Around the 15th century, Bình Lục district was an oasis and from this location that the local people began to spread around to reclaim.

In the 19th and 20th centuries, when Hà Nam province began to form, Bình Lục acted as a cultural center of the region with the emergence of many families with achievements from imperial examinations.

== Culture ==
By Philippe Papin's research, at the beginning of Christ, the entire Red River Delta was still a flooded bay so almost no humans reside.

Bình Lục rural district is where scientists excavated six bronze drums such as Ngọc Lũ, Vũ Bị and An Lão in the 1960s. This coincides with a number of officials' reports on shipwreck by storms or pirates in this region about the Three Kingdoms period.

Bình Lục is where Nguyễn Khuyến's father was born.

== See also ==
- Duy Tiên
- Thanh Liêm
- Vụ Bản
- Mỹ Lộc
