= Thanh Liêm =

- Commune
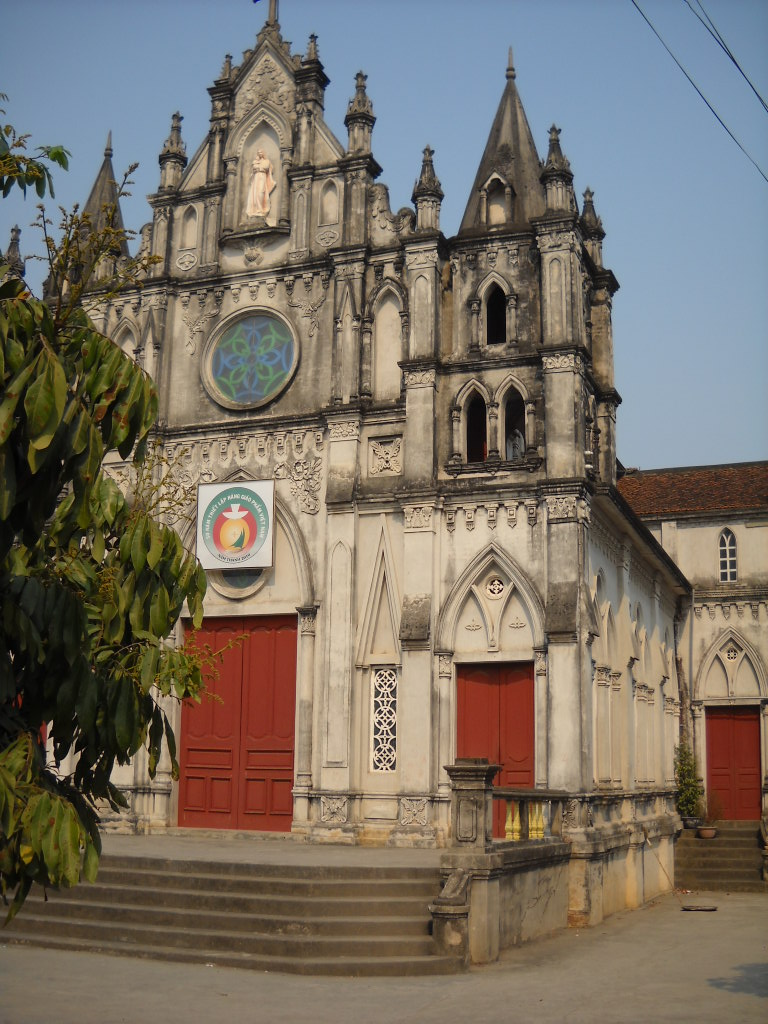
- Lác Nội Church
- Interactive map of Thanh Liêm
- Coordinates: 20.41657112493098°N 105.92941425773809°E
- Country: Vietnam
- Region: Red River Delta
- Province: Ninh Bình
- Established: 16 June 2025
- Administrative headquarters: Thanh Nguyên Hamlet

Area
  - Total: 23.27 km^{2} (8.98 sq mi)

Population (2025)
  - Total: 23,609
  - Density: 1,014/km^{2} (2,630/sq mi)
- Postal code: 18414
- Website: thanhliem.ninhbinh.gov.vn

Thanh Liêm is a commune in Ninh Bình province, Vietnam. It is one of 129 new communes and wards in Ninh Bình province established as part of the 2025 Vietnamese administrative reforms. The commune inherited its name from the former Thanh Liêm district, Hà Nam province.

== History ==
The area of present-day Thanh Liêm Commune was formerly part of Thanh Liêm district, Hà Nam province.

On 12 June 2025, the National Assembly of Vietnam adopted Resolution No. 202/2025/QH15 on the reorganization of provincial-level administrative units (effective from 12 June 2025). Under the resolution, Hà Nam province and Nam Định province were merged into Ninh Bình province.

On 16 June 2025:

- The National Assembly of Vietnam adopted Resolution No. 203/2025/QH15 amending and supplementing several articles of the Constitution of Vietnam (effective from 16 June 2025). Under the resolution, district-level administrative units nationwide ceased to operate from 1 July 2025.
- The Standing Committee of the National Assembly of Vietnam issued Resolution No. 1674/NQ-UBTVQH15 on the arrangement of commune-level administrative units in Ninh Bình province in 2025 (effective from 16 June 2025). Under the resolution, the entire area and population of Thanh Hương, Thanh Tâm, and Thanh Nguyên communes, formerly part of Thanh Liêm district, were merged to form a new commune named Thanh Liêm.
