= Kim Bảng (town) =

Coordinates: 20.583°N 105.850°E

Kim Bảng town Thị xã Kim Bảng
- District-level town (Class-4)
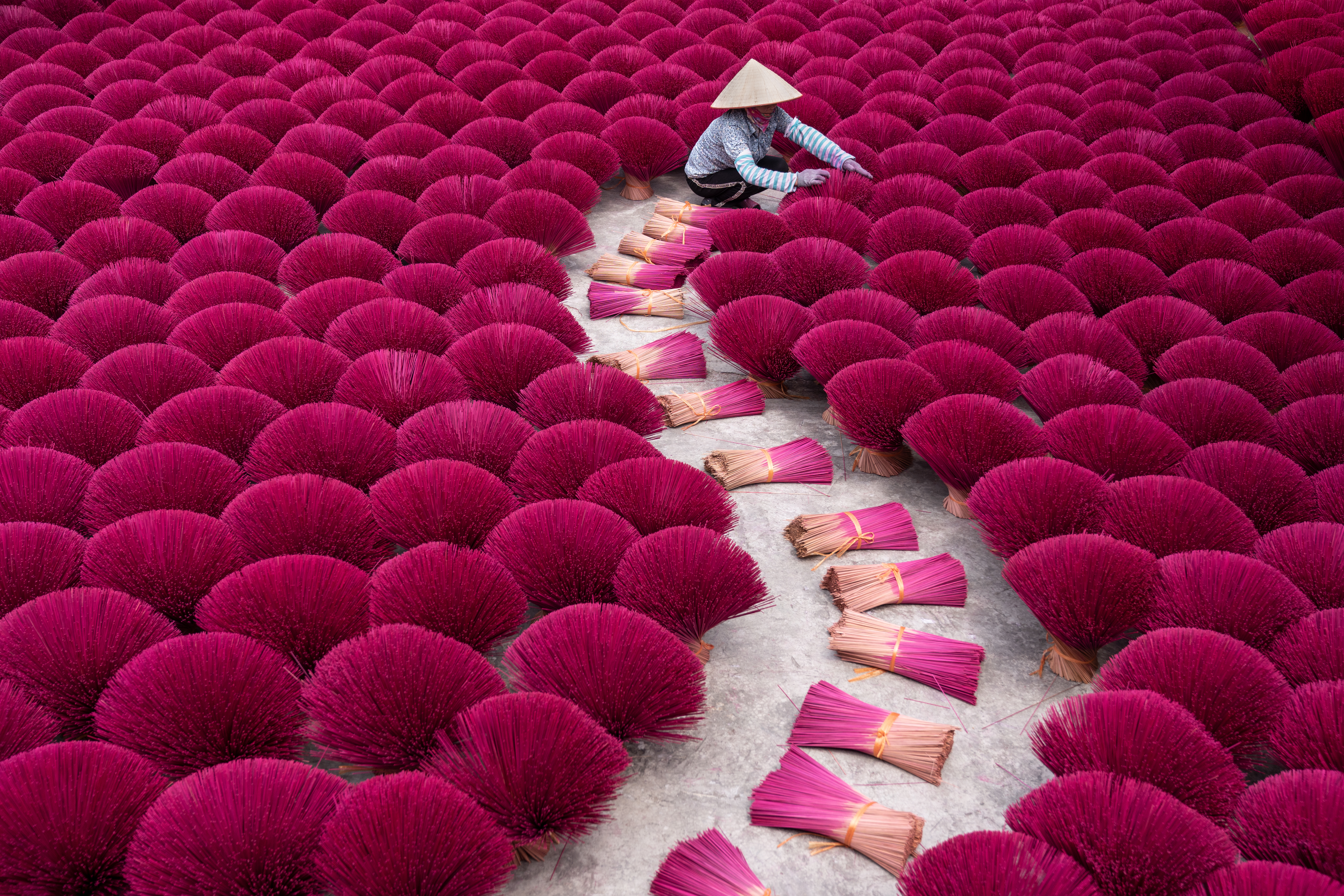
- View of a village has its tradition of producing incense in Kim Bảng town.
- Motto(s): "Mix with country – Rise to shine" (Hòa nhịp non sông – Vươn cao tỏa sáng)
- Interactive map of Kim Bảng town Thị xã Kim Bảng
- Country: Vietnam
- Region: Red River Delta
- Province: Hà Nam
- Establishment: IX century
- Central hall: No.67, Trần Hưng Đạo road, Lan Quế ward, Kim Bảng town

Government
  - Type: Municipality
  - People Committee's Chairman: Nguyễn Thành Thăng
  - People Council's Chairman: Nguyễn Văn Đoàn
  - Front Committee's Chairman: Lại Thị Tuyết Lan
  - Party Committee's Secretary: Lê Văn Hà

Area
  - Total: 175.40 km^{2} (67.72 sq mi)

Population (2025)
  - Total: 145,744
  - Density: 830.92/km^{2} (2,152.1/sq mi)
  - Ethnicities: Kinh; Tanka; Muong
- Time zone: UTC+7 (Indochina Time)
- ZIP code: 18000-183 (Note: An official code from December 31, 2023 to present.)
- Website: Kimbang.Hanam.gov.vn; Kimbang.Hanam.dcs.vn

Kim Bảng [kim˧˧:ɓa̰ːŋ˧˩˧] was formerly a district-level town of former Hà Nam province in the Red River Delta region of Vietnam.

== History ==
=== Middle Ages ===
According to four documents of Cựu Đường thư, An Nam chí lược, An Nam chí nguyên and Đại Việt sử ký toàn thư, on the right bank of the Đáy river there was an administrative unit called Cổ Bảng rural district (Note: By ideas of researchers Thiều Chửu, Tạ Chí Đại Trường and Nguyễn Hùng Vỹ, word "cổ-bảng" are the Hanese ways of the phonetic for "k'lang" in ancient Annamese language, which mean "big river" (江, giang).) (Cổ Bảng huyện; 古榜縣), belonging to Lị Nhân canton (Lị Nhân châu; 利仁州).

=== 20th century ===
Under the State of Vietnam regime, Kim Bảng was renamed Kim Bảng district (quận Kim Bảng), part of Hà Nam province (tỉnh Hà Nam).

=== 21st century ===
On November 8, 2024, the Ministry of Construction issued Decision 1036/QĐ-BXD on "recognition of areas where were expected to establish wards under Kim Bảng municipality, Hà Nam province, meeting the developed standard of the urban infrastructure which was applied to wards of the IV-class urban area". (Note: Quyết định số 1036/QĐ-BXD về việc công nhận các khu vực dự kiến thành lập phường thuộc đô thị Kim Bảng, tỉnh Hà Nam đạt tiêu chuẩn trình độ phát triển cơ sở hạ tầng đô thị áp dụng đối với phường của đô thị loại IV.) Accordingly, all levels of the Vietnamese government have agreed to prepare for the recognition of the urban regime for the entire area of Kim Bảng rural district.

On November 14, 2024, the National Assembly Standing Committee issued Resolution 1288/NQ-UBTVQH on organizing the district and commune-level administrative units of Hà Nam province for the period of 2023–25, which took effect as of January 1, 2025. Accordingly, Kim Bảng town (thị xã Kim Bảng) in Hà Nam province was officially established on the basis of the entire Kim Bảng rural district.

== Geography ==
=== Topography ===
Since the evening of February 8, 2025, the area of Kim Bảng town has been automatically divided into 17 commune-level administrative units.

- 10 wards : Ba Sao, Đại Cương, Đồng Hóa, Lan Quế, Lê Hồ, Ngọc Sơn, Tân Sơn, Tân Tựu, Thi Sơn, Tượng Lĩnh.
- 7 communes : Hoàng Tây, Khả Phong, Liên Sơn, Nguyễn Úy, Thanh Sơn, Thụy Lôi, Văn Xá.

According to the 2023 statistical yearbook of the whole Hà Nam province, Kim Bảng town covers an area of 175.40 km^{2}. The Đồng Khánh địa dư chí refers to Kim Bảng as being seated on two large rivers, Đáy and Nhuệ, so it was almost very sunken, which is a disadvantage to local agriculture during the rainy season. However, its Southwest consists of quite high limestone mountains, and there is a significant amount of clay, where it was part of the Hòa Bình plateau.

Additionally, Kim Bảng is also the intersection of the national highways 21A, 21B, 21C and 38.

=== Demography ===
As of 2025, Kim Bảng town had a population of 145,744. In particular, all people are registered as Kẻ Kinh.

== Culture ==
Since the 2010s, Kim Bảng town has been widely known as a particular destination for spiritual tourism.

- Tam Chúc national tourist area (Khu du lịch quốc gia Tam Chúc) is located in Ba Sao ward and Khả Phong commune.
- White Horse temple (miếu Bạch Mã), devoted to the worship of Linh Lang Prince, an Đinh Hoàn emperor who unified the country in the 9th century.
- Bà Banh temple (đền Bà Banh) was built in the 7th century to worship the Four Dharma Seals. Its name (Note: Means "lady shows off her vulva".) stems from a Champa dancer statue (vũ nữ Trà Kiệu), which was made by Champa prisoners in the Lý Dynasty.
- Luồn cave and Dong pond (Note: Luồn and Dong are Mường words to describe the genitals.) in Thi Sơn ward.

According to the documents of the Hà Nam Communist Party Committee, the area of Kim Bảng town was the beginning of the Xuân Phả performance (trò Xuân Phả) from 1433. However, this theory is still a subject of debate.

== Economy ==
In the territory of Kim Bảng town, there are a number of traditional craft villages, such as :

- Ceramics and porcelain in Quyết Thành village.
- Wooden furniture and handicrafts in Nhật Tân village.
- Threaded embroidery in Phương Thượng village.
- Weaving in Lác Nhuế village.
- Limestone mining in the Western communes.

== See also ==
- Lạc Thủy district
- Mỹ Đức district
- Thanh Liêm district
- Ứng Hòa district
