= Nguyễn Bính =

Vietnamese poet (1918–1966)

Nguyễn Bính (Vụ Bản 1918 – Nam Định 1966) was a Vietnamese poet. A committed supporter of the August Revolution, he moved to the resistance base of Viet Minh, a united front led by Indochinese Communist Party, in Đồng Tháp Mười leading a literature and arts unit. Later he was editor of the semi-independent poetry magazine Trăm hoa, literally A Hundred Flowers.
