= Nguyen Binh =

Nguyen Binh may refer to:

- Nguyễn Bính (1918–1966), Vietnamese poet
- Nguyễn Bình (1906–1951), Lieutenant-general in the Viet Minh

== See also ==
- Nguyên Bình (disambiguation)
