= Đông A =

Đông A Phường Đông A
- Ward
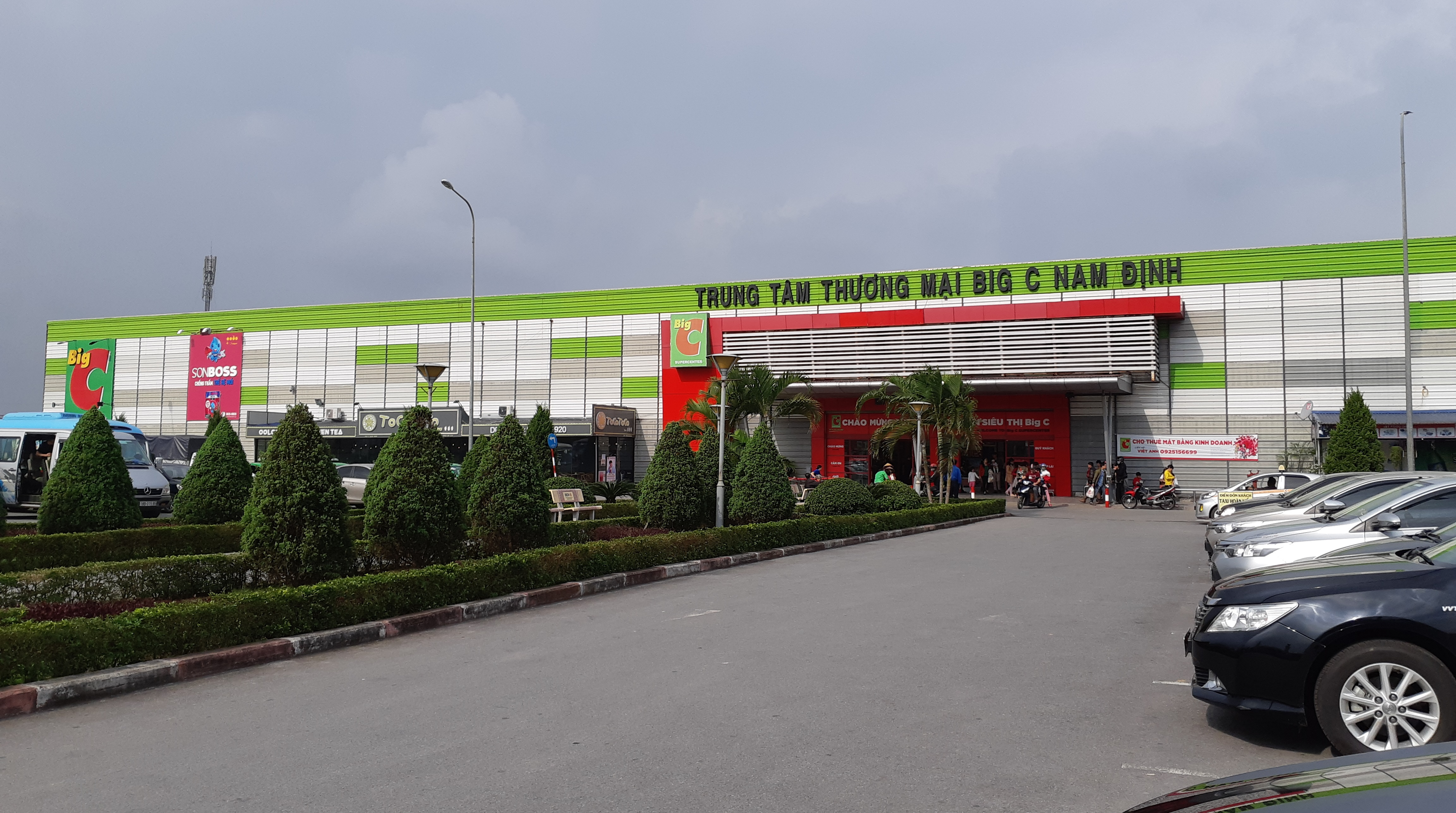
- GO! Nam Định (former Big C Nam Định)
- Interactive map of Đông A
- Country: Vietnam
- Regions: Red River Delta
- Province: Ninh Bình Province
- Established: June 16, 2025

Area
  - Total: 22.07 km^{2} (8.52 sq mi)

Population (2025)
  - Total: 31,802
  - Density: 1,441/km^{2} (3,732/sq mi)
- Time zone: UTC+07:00 (Indochina Time)

Đông A is a ward (phường) of Ninh Bình Province, Vietnam.

== Geography ==
Đông A Ward located in northeastern Ninh Bình Province, and adjacent to:

- Bình Giang Commune to the north
- Thành Nam Ward to the south
- Mỹ Lộc Ward to the west
- Nam Định Ward and Nam Lý Commune to the east.

== History ==
On June 12, 2025, the National Assembly of Vietnam issued Resolution No. 202/2025/QH15 on the arrangement of provincial-level administrative units (effective from June 12, 2025). Accordingly, the entire land area and population of Hà Nam Province, Nam Định Province and Ninh Bình Province were merged to form a new province named Ninh Bình Province.

On June 16, 2025, the Standing Committee of the National Assembly of Vietnam issued Resolution No. 1674/NQ-UBTVQH15 on the arrangement of commune-level administrative units of Ninh Bình Province in 2025 (effective from June 16, 2025). Accordingly, the entire land area and population of Lộc Hòa Ward, Mỹ Thắng Commune and Mỹ Hà Commune were merged to form a new ward named Đông A Ward.
