= Thanh Lâm (disambiguation) =

Thanh Lâm may refer to several places in Vietnam:

- Thanh Lâm, a commune of Ninh Bình province
- Thanh Lâm, Hanoi, a former rural commune of Mê Linh district
- Thanh Lâm, Bắc Giang, a former rural commune of Lục Nam district
- Thanh Lâm, Nghệ An, a former rural commune of Thanh Chương district
- Thanh Lâm, Quảng Ninh, a former rural commune of Ba Chẽ district
- Thanh Lâm, Thanh Hóa, a former rural commune of Như Xuân district
