= Thanh Lâm =

- Commune
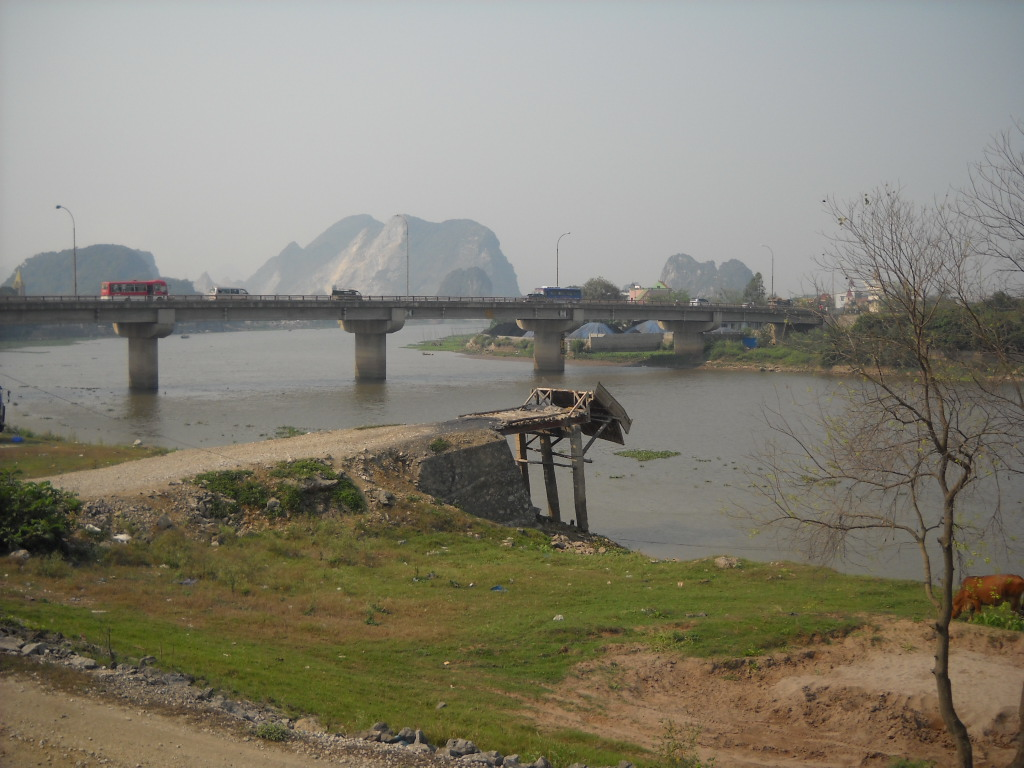
- Đoan Vĩ Bridge, connecting Thanh Lâm and Gia Trấn
- Interactive map of Thanh Lâm
- Coordinates: 20.41944982412588°N 105.91432350808654°E
- Country: Vietnam
- Region: Red River Delta
- Province: Ninh Bình
- Established: 1 July 2025

Area
  - Total: 52.91 km^{2} (20.43 sq mi)

Population (2025)
  - Total: 29,550
  - Density: 558/km^{2} (1,450/sq mi)
- Postal code: 18412

Thanh Lâm is a mountainous commune in Ninh Bình province, Vietnam. It is one of 129 new communes and wards in Ninh Bình province established as part of the 2025 Vietnamese administrative reforms.

== History ==
The area of present-day Thanh Lâm Commune was formerly part of Thanh Liêm district, Hà Nam province.

On 12 June 2025, the National Assembly of Vietnam adopted Resolution No. 202/2025/QH15 on the reorganization of provincial-level administrative units (effective from 12 June 2025). Under the resolution, the entire area and population of Hà Nam province, Nam Định province, and Ninh Bình province were reorganized to form a new province named Ninh Bình.

On 16 June 2025:

- The National Assembly of Vietnam adopted Resolution No. 203/2025/QH15 amending and supplementing several articles of the Constitution of Vietnam (effective from 16 June 2025). Under the resolution, district-level administrative units nationwide ceased to operate from 1 July 2025.
- The Standing Committee of the National Assembly of Vietnam issued Resolution No. 1674/NQ-UBTVQH15 on the arrangement of commune-level administrative units in Ninh Bình province in 2025 (effective from 16 June 2025). Under the resolution, the entire area and population of Thanh Nghị, Thanh Tân, and Thanh Hải communes, formerly part of Thanh Liêm district, were merged to form a new commune named Thanh Lâm.
