= Thiên Trường =

Thiên Trường Phường Thiên Trường
- Ward
- Tân Đệ Bridge
- Interactive map of Thiên Trường
- Location in Vietnam
- Country: Vietnam
- Regions: Red River Delta
- Province: Ninh Bình Province
- Established: June 16, 2025

Area
  - Total: 20.53 km^{2} (7.93 sq mi)

Population (2025)
  - Total: 31,031
  - Density: 1,511/km^{2} (3,915/sq mi)
- Time zone: UTC+07:00 (Indochina Time)

Thiên Trường is a ward (phường) of Ninh Bình Province, Vietnam.

== Geography ==
Thiên Trường Ward located in northeastern Ninh Bình Province, and adjacent to:

- Nam Lý Commune and Hưng Yên Province to the north
- Vị Khê Ward to the south
- Nam Định Ward to the west
- Hưng Yên Province to the east.

== History ==
On June 12, 2025, the National Assembly of Vietnam issued Resolution No. 202/2025/QH15 on the arrangement of provincial-level administrative units (effective from June 12, 2025). Accordingly, the entire land area and population of Hà Nam Province, Nam Định Province and Ninh Bình Province were merged to form a new province named Ninh Bình Province.

On June 16, 2025, the Standing Committee of the National Assembly of Vietnam issued Resolution No. 1674/NQ-UBTVQH15 on the arrangement of commune-level administrative units of Ninh Bình Province in 2025 (effective from June 16, 2025). Accordingly, the entire land area and population of Lộc Hạ Ward, Mỹ Tân Commune and Mỹ Trung Commune were merged to form a new ward named Thiên Trường Ward.
