= Bình Lục =

- Commune
- Interactive map of Bình Lục
- Coordinates: 20.566217539166036°N 106.0155972676405°E
- Country: Vietnam
- Region: Red River Delta
- Province: Ninh Bình
- Established: 16 June 2025
- Administrative headquarters: Cát Lại Hamlet 2

Area
  - Total: 23.97 km^{2} (9.25 sq mi)

Population (2025)
  - Total: 35,225
  - Density: 1,469/km^{2} (3,800/sq mi)
- Postal code: 18525
- Website: binhluc.ninhbinh.gov.vn

Bình Lục is a commune in Ninh Bình province, Vietnam. It is one of 129 new communes and wards in Ninh Bình province established as part of the 2025 Vietnamese administrative reforms. The commune inherited its name from the former Bình Lục district, Hà Nam province.

== History ==
The area of present-day Bình Lục commune was formerly part of Bình Lục district, Hà Nam province.

On 12 June 2025, the National Assembly of Vietnam adopted Resolution No. 202/2025/QH15 on the reorganization of provincial-level administrative units, which merged Hà Nam province and Nam Định province into Ninh Bình province.

On 16 June 2025, the National Assembly of Vietnam adopted Resolution No. 203/2025/QH15 amending and supplementing several articles of the Constitution of Vietnam, which provided for the termination of district-level administrative units nationwide from 1 July 2025.

On the same date, the Standing Committee of the National Assembly of Vietnam issued Resolution No. 1674/NQ-UBTVQH15 on the arrangement of commune-level administrative units in Ninh Bình province in 2025. Under the resolution, the entire area and population of Tràng An, Bình Nghĩa, and Đồng Du communes, formerly part of Bình Lục district, were merged to form a new commune named Bình Lục.
