= Nguyên Bình (disambiguation) =

Nguyên Bình may refer to several places in Vietnam:

- Nguyên Bình, Cao Bằng, a commune of Cao Bằng province
- Nguyên Bình district, a former rural district of Cao Bằng Province
- Nguyên Bình, Thanh Hóa, a former ward of Nghi Sơn town

== See also ==
- Nguyen Binh (disambiguation)
