= Trần Temple in Nam Định =

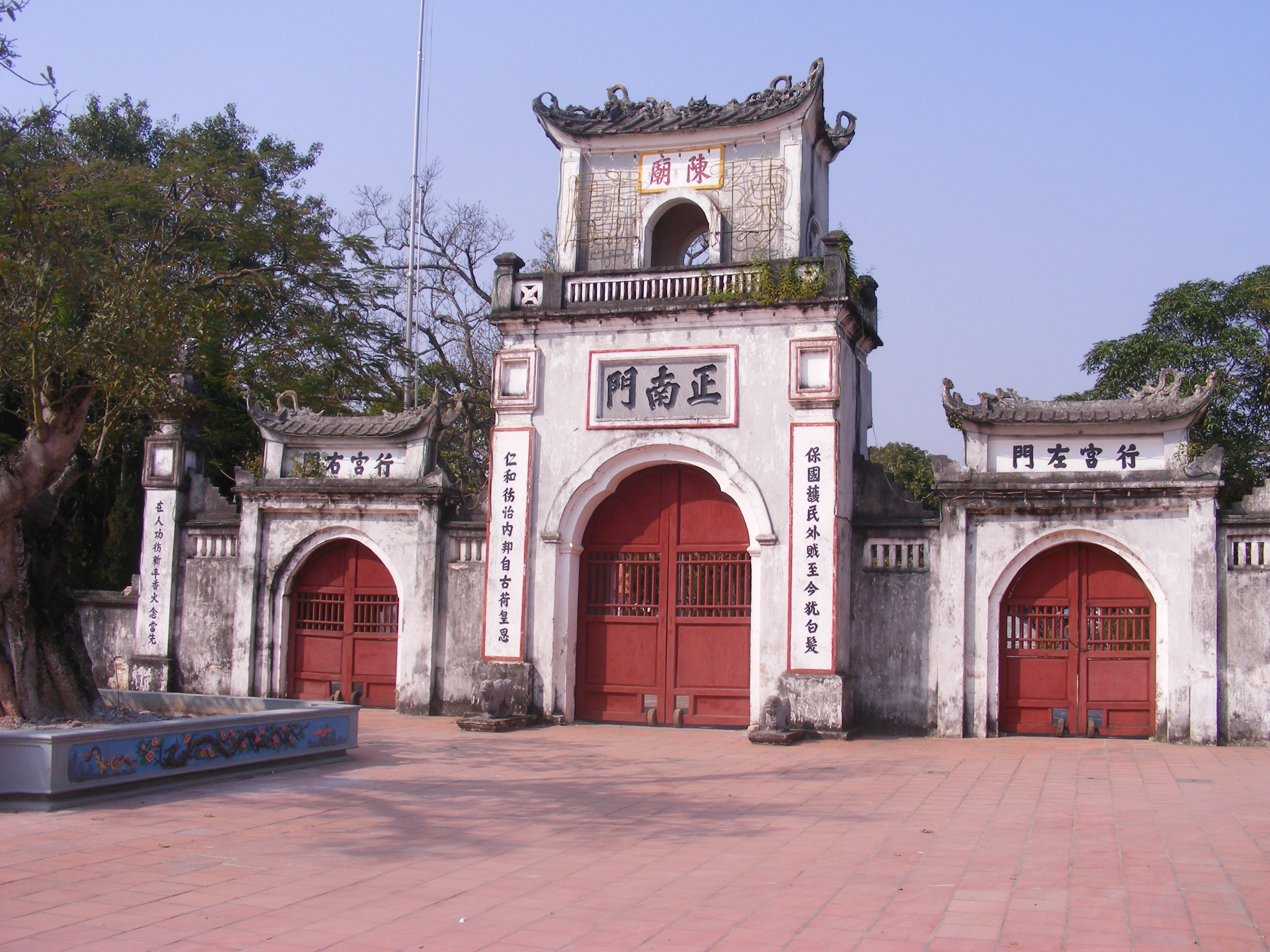
Outer gate of the Đền Trần complex

The Trần Temple of Nam Định (Đền Trần, Nam Định) is a temple complex of which the more recent middle section is dedicated to national hero Hưng Đạo Đại Vương (Prince Trần Quốc Tuấn) in Nam Định, Vietnam.

The complex consists of three major temples: Thiên Trường (1695), Cố Trạch (1894) and Trùng Hoa (2000).

== Thiên Trường Temple ==
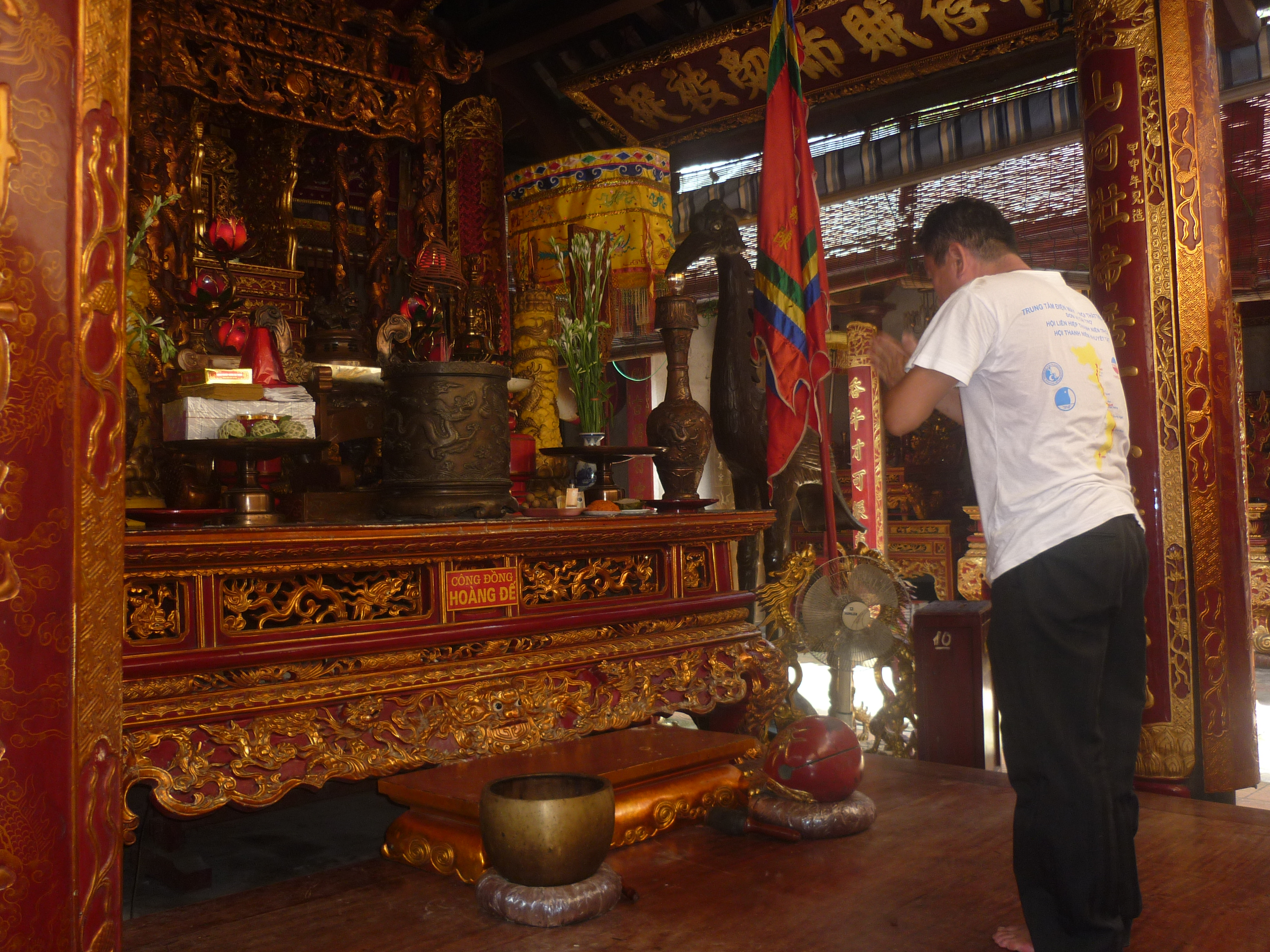
Thiên Trường Temple, dedicated to the 14 kings

Thiên Trường Temple was dedicated to the 14 Tran Dynasty kings.

== Cố Trạch Temple ==
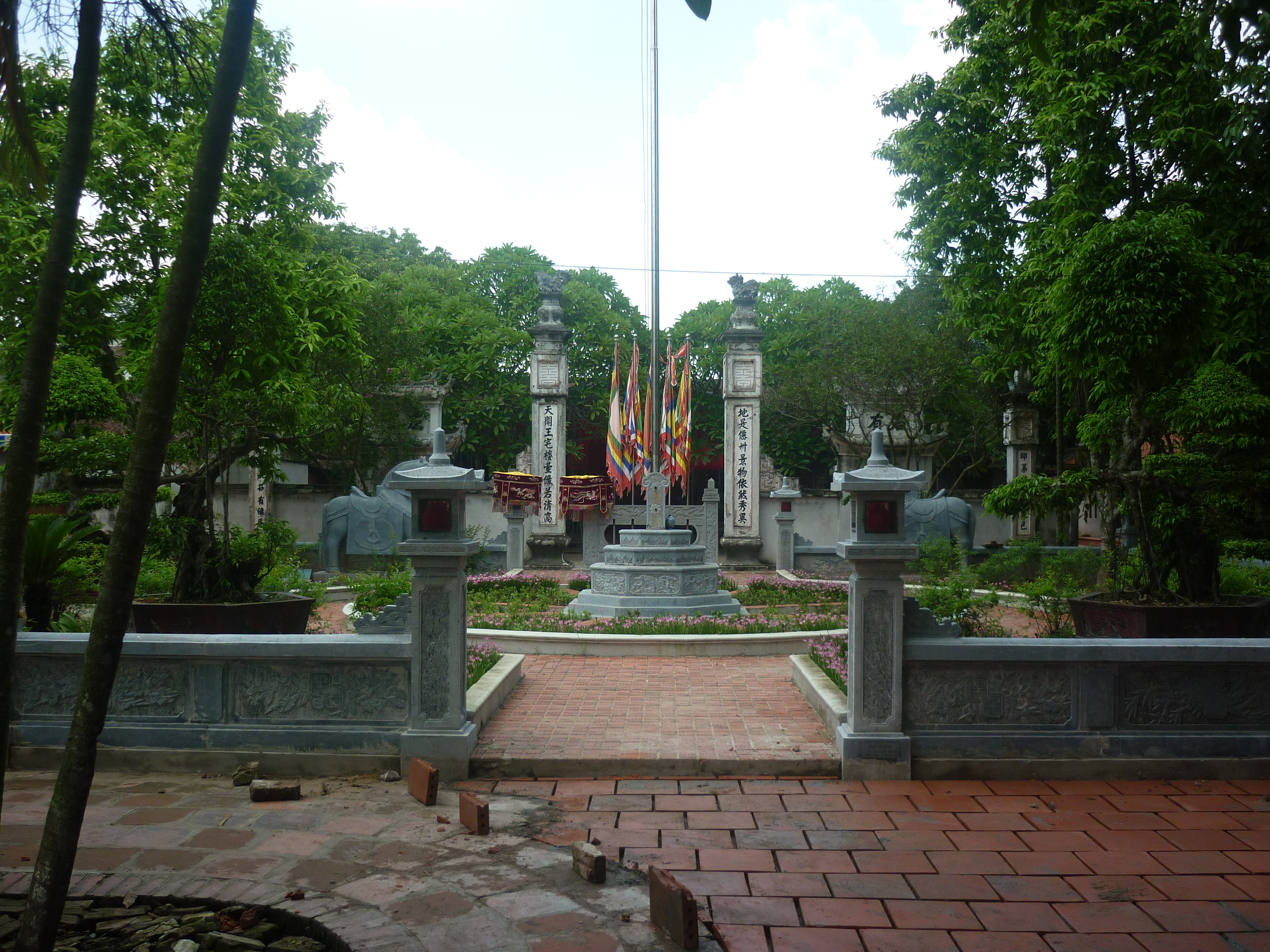
Cố Trạch Temple, dedicated to national hero Trần Hưng Đạo

Co Trach Temple is dedicated to Hung Dao Dai Vuong-Tran Quoc Tuan who was a commander-in-chief of Vietnam who fought off the Mongols in their multiple invasions of Vietnam in the 13th century.

When remodeling the Tran temple to the east, people dug out a stone stele with the words "Trùng kiến Hưng Đạo thân vương cố trạch bi kí" meaning "the old house of Hung Dao Vuong Tran Quoc Tuan." They built the temple on the old floor and called it Cố Trạch (also known as Ha Temple) to work for him, his family, his assistants and generals. The temple was built beside the Thien Truong temple, architecture "Noi Cong ngoai Quoc" (Chinese Words). It has been ranked number 65 by Vien Dong Bac Co.

== Trùng Hoa Temple ==
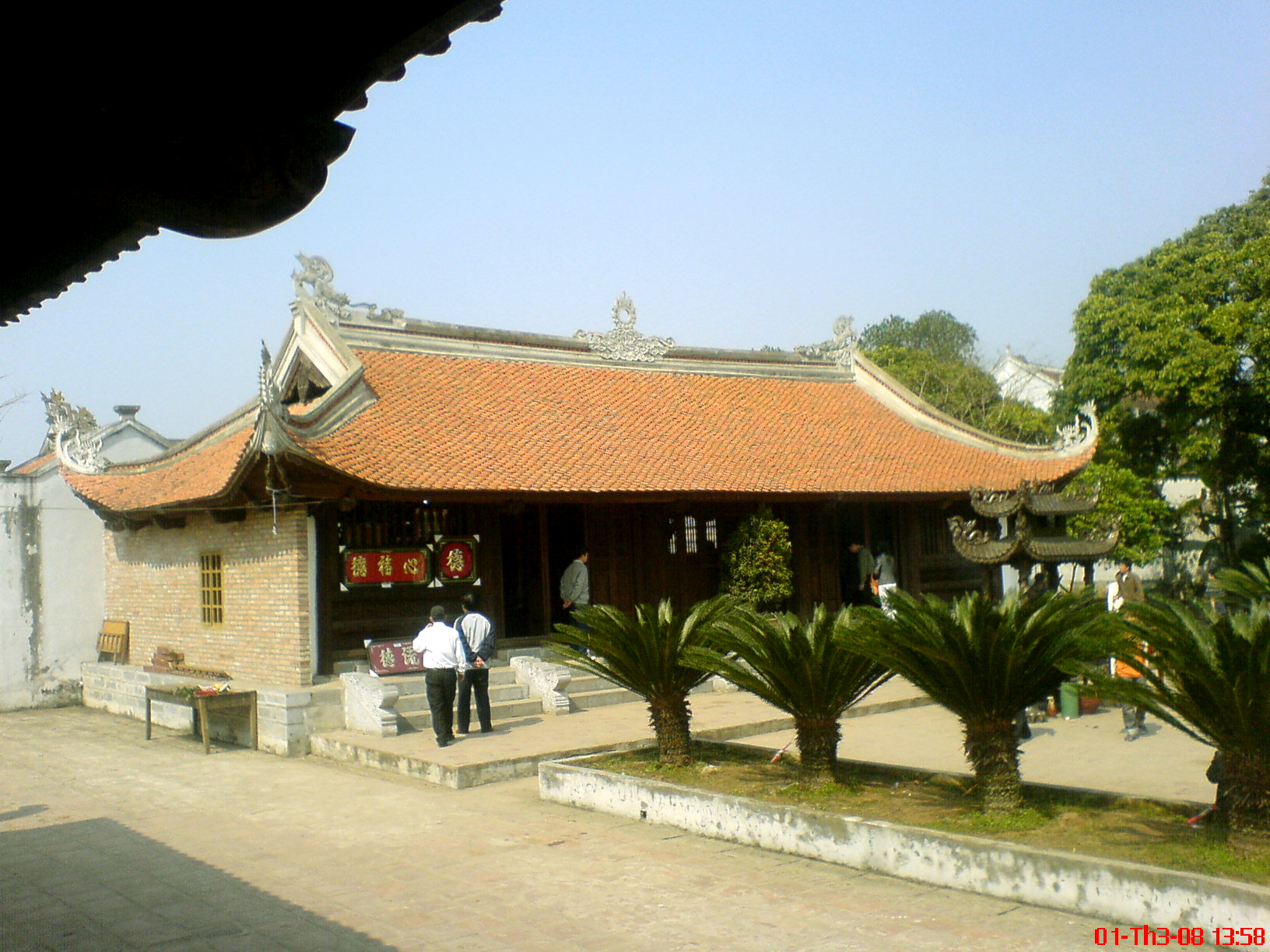
New temple

This is a new temple built in 2000.

== Festival ==
The Cố Trạch festival is celebrated in the city of Nam Định from August 18 to 20. It celebrates Trần Hưng Đạo.
