= Lương Kim Định =

- Born: 15 June 1914; Nam Dinh, French Indochina
- Died: 25 March 1997 (aged 82); Carthage, Missouri, U.S.
- Era: 20th-century philosophy
- Region: Eastern philosophy
- Main interests: “Authentic Vietnamese Confucianism”

Lương Kim Định or Dominic Lương Kim Định, Kim Định (15 June 1914 – 25 March 1997 in Carthage, Missouri) was a Vietnamese catholic priest, scholar and philosopher.

== Biography ==
He was born in Nam Dinh, French Indochina. He was ordained Catholic priest in 1943. He was a philosophy graduate of the Seminary of Saint Albert le Grand, and a professor of philosophy at Bui Chu Seminary (1943–46). He afterwards went to Paris, France to study French civilization, sociology and philosophy at Institut Catholique de Paris, and Confucianism at the Institut des Hautes Etudes Chinoises. Returning to Vietnam in 1957, he taught philosophy at the Le Bao Tinh Academy and the Saigon University Faculty of Letters since 1960, Van Hanh University since 1967, and Dalat University. Philosopher Kim Dinh died on 25 March 1997 at Carthage, Missouri, USA, aged 83.

== Works ==
He published more than 30 books on Vietnamese culture and philosophy from 1963 until his death. The numerous works of Kim Dinh present a plethora of insights into the Vietnamese cultural heritage and can serve as a valuable basis for a Vietnamese‑American theology. He established the philosophies of An Vi (or An Việt, “Tranquillity Philosophy”) and “Authentic Vietnamese Confucianism” (Việt Nho).
