= Thành Nam =

Thành Nam Phường Thành Nam
- Ward
- Hòa Xá Industrial Park
- Interactive map of Thành Nam
- Location in Vietnam
- Country: Vietnam
- Regions: Red River Delta
- Province: Ninh Bình Province
- Established: June 16, 2025

Area
  - Total: 16.03 km^{2} (6.19 sq mi)

Population (2025)
  - Total: 30,830
  - Density: 1,923/km^{2} (4,981/sq mi)
- Time zone: UTC+07:00 (Indochina Time)

Thành Nam is a ward (phường) of Ninh Bình Province, Vietnam.

== Geography ==
Thành Nam Ward located in northeastern Ninh Bình Province, and adjacent to:

- Đông A Ward and Mỹ Lộc Ward to the north
- Trường Thi Ward to the south and east
- Hiển Khánh Commune to the west.

== History ==
On June 12, 2025, the National Assembly of Vietnam issued Resolution No. 202/2025/QH15 on the arrangement of provincial-level administrative units (effective from June 12, 2025). Accordingly, the entire land area and population of Hà Nam Province, Nam Định Province and Ninh Bình Province were merged to form a new province named Ninh Bình Province.

On June 16, 2025, the Standing Committee of the National Assembly of Vietnam issued Resolution No. 1674/NQ-UBTVQH15 on the arrangement of commune-level administrative units of Ninh Bình Province in 2025 (effective from June 16, 2025). Accordingly, the entire land area and population of Mỹ Xá Ward and Đại An Commune were merged to form a new ward named Thành Nam Ward.
