= Mỹ Lộc =

Mỹ Lộc Ward Phường Mỹ Lộc Huyện Mỹ Lộc
- Ward (Class-II)
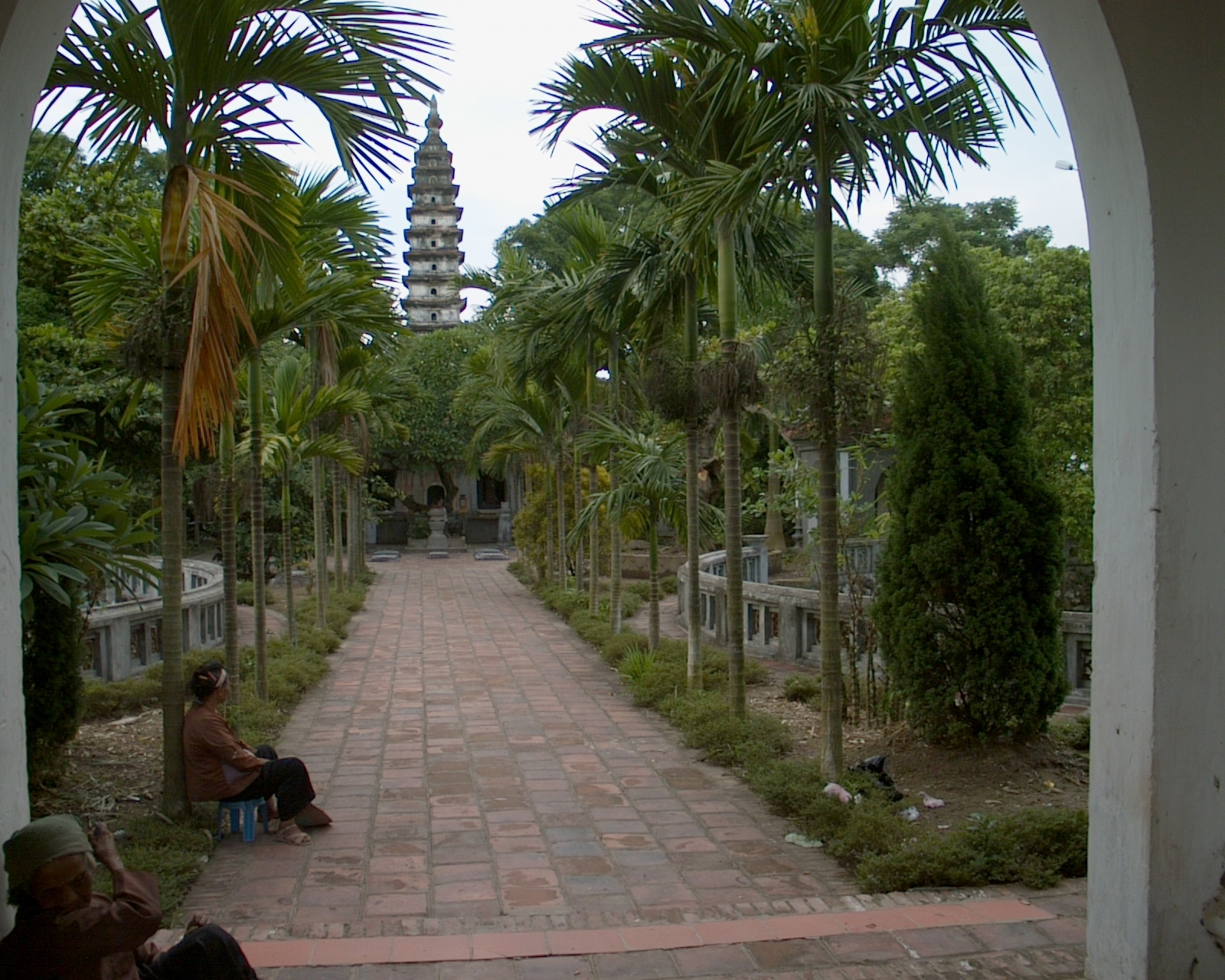
- Gate of Phổ Minh Pagoda.

- Location within Vietnam
- Coordinates: 20.44°N 106.10°E
- Country: Vietnam
- Region: Red River Delta
- Province: Ninh Bình
- Establishment: 1945 (rural district); July 23, 2024 (commune); July 1, 2025 (ward)
- Central hall: No. 1, 21A National Route, Mỹ Lộc Ward

Government
  - Type: Municipality
  - People Committee's Chairman: ?
  - People Council's chairman: ?
  - Front Committee's chairman: ?
  - Party Committee's Secretary: ?

Area
  - Total: 35.54 km^{2} (13.72 sq mi)

Population (June 16, 2025)
  - Total: 38,068
  - Density: 1,071/km^{2} (2,770/sq mi)
  - Ethnicities: Kinh; Tanka
- Time zone: UTC+7 (Indochina Time)
- ZIP code: 08000–07200 (Note: An official code from July 1, 2025 to present.)
- Climate: Cwa

Mỹ Lộc [miʔi˧˥:lə̰ʔwk˨˩] is a ward of Ninh Bình province in the Red River Delta of the Northern Vietnam. It was previously a rural district of former Nam Định province before July 1, 2025.

== History ==
=== Middle Ages ===
During the Đường dynasty, its site was once the administrative center of Hiển Khánh Rural District (Hiển Khánh huyện), called Tức Mặc Village (Tức Mặc hương). (Note: It means "inkstone" in Hanese language.) Its name came from the shape of a large lotus pond, which soon developed into the Buddhist center of the lower Red River region.

During the Trần dynasty, Tức Mặc Village was used as a retirement home for the Grand Emperors. This location was then the center of Thiên Trường Prefecture (Thiên Trường phủ).

After the Later Lê dynasty came to power, Buddhism was no longer prosperous, so Tức Mặc Village was almost abandoned. Thiên Trường prefecture was incorporated into a new administrative unit called Sơn Nam Garrison (Sơn Nam thừa tuyên) in 1469, with its capital at Vân Sàng Village (Vân Sàng động).

By the Revival Lê dynasty, its area served as the outskirts of Vị Hoàng Village (Vị Hoàng thôn), the capital of Sơn Nam Hạ Garrison (Sơn Nam Hạ trấn).

=== XX century ===
When Nam Định City (thành phố Nam Định) began to be planned, the Government of French Tonkin divided its outskirts into three communes Mỹ Thành, Mỹ Thịnh and Mỹ Tiến. By 1945, these three communes were officially merged into Mỹ Lộc rural district (huyện Mỹ Lộc).

Under the State of Vietnam regime, Mỹ Lộc rural district was changed into Mỹ Lộc District (quận Mỹ Lộc).

=== XXI century ===
On 1 September 2024, Mỹ Lộc Rural District was merged into Nam Định City.

Since June 16, 2025, to realize the plan to arrange and merge administrative units, the Standing Committee of the Vietnam National Assembly has issued Resolution 1674/NQ-UBTVQH15 on the arrangement of commune-level administrative units of new Ninh Bình province. Accordingly, the entire natural area and population of Hưng Lộc Ward of former Nam Định City were re-merged with similar conditions from communes Mỹ Lộc and Mỹ Thuận to become Mỹ Lộc ward (phường Mỹ Lộc).

== Culture ==
The image of Phổ Minh Tower (tháp Phổ Minh) has long been featured by the Government of Vietnam on the 100-dong note, the smallest denomination and still in circulation today. However, due to the poor endurance of the economy, this note is now mostly found in private collections and is no longer available on the market.

== See also ==
- Bình Lục
- Đông A
- Nam Định
- Thành Nam
- Thiên Trường
- Vụ Bản
