= Hưng Yên =

Hưng Yên may refer to:

- Hưng Yên province, a province in northern Vietnam
- Hưng Yên (city), former provincial city of Hưng Yên province
