= Thanh Liêm district =

Coordinates: 20.450°N 105.917°E

Thanh Liêm district Huyện Thanh Liêm
- District
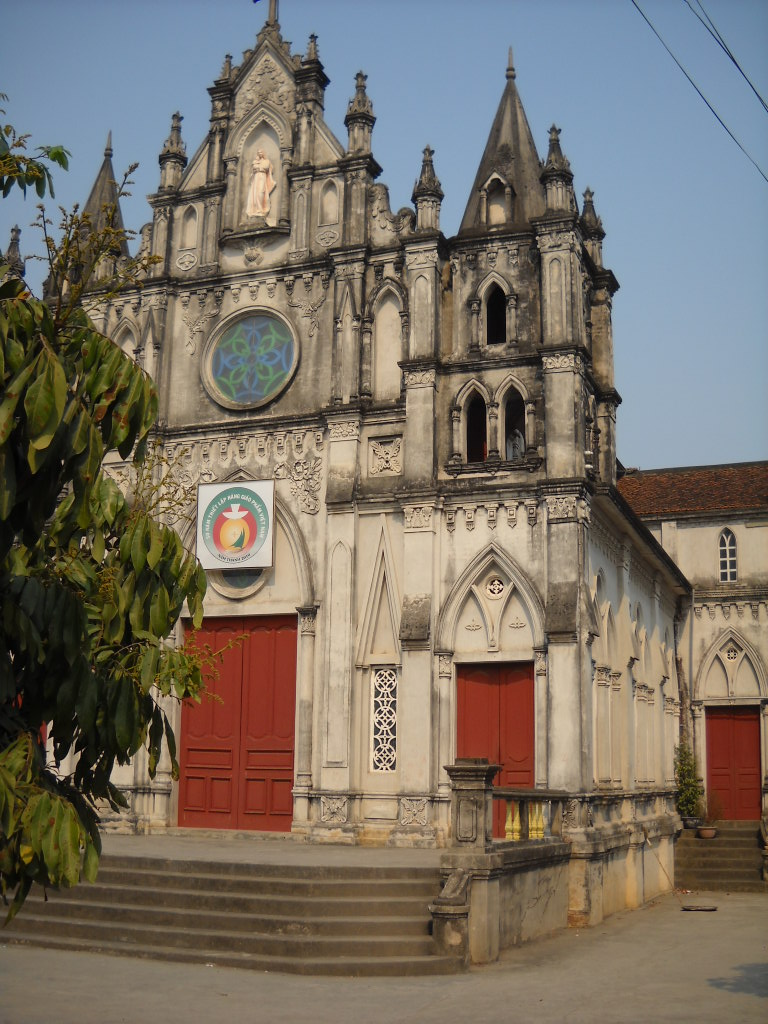
- In front of Lác Nội church
- Country: Vietnam
- Region: Red River Delta
- Province: Hà Nam
- Capital: Tân Thanh

Area
  - Total: 67.58 sq mi (175.02 km^{2})

Population (2019)
  - Total: 144,760
  - Density: 2,142.2/sq mi (827.11/km^{2})
- Time zone: UTC+07:00 (Indochina Time)

Thanh Liêm is a former rural district of Hà Nam province in the Red River Delta region of Vietnam. As of 2019 the district had a population of 144,760. The district covers an area of 175.02 km^{2}. The district capital lies at Tân Thanh.
