= Vụ Bản =

- Commune
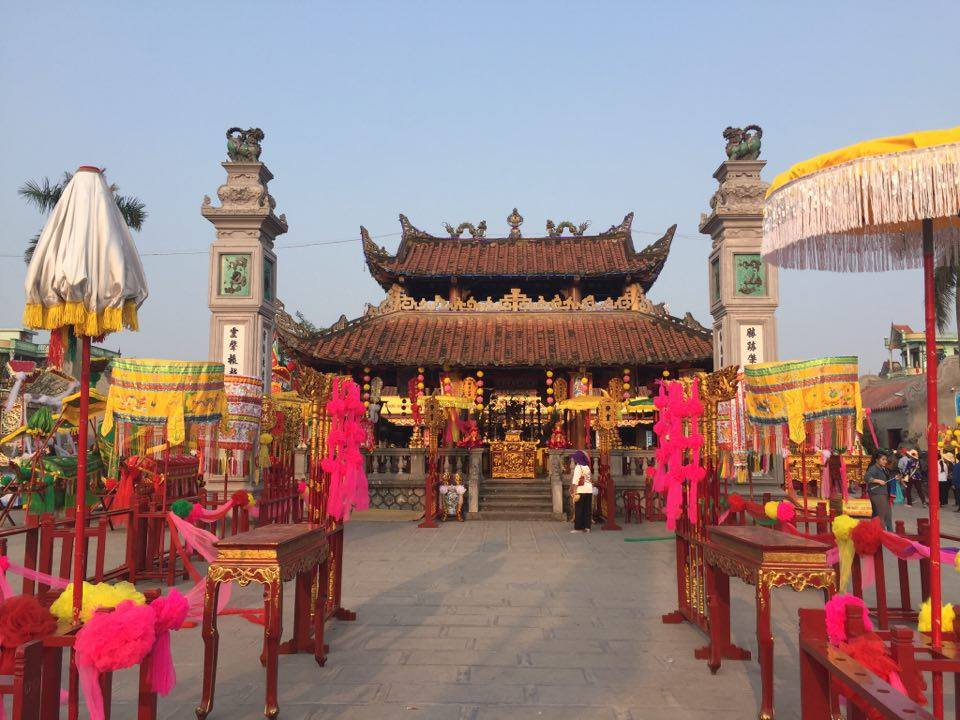
- Phủ Dầy Festival
- Interactive map of Vụ Bản
- Coordinates: 20.333623091757097°N 106.07904440600575°E
- Country: Vietnam
- Region: Red River Delta
- Province: Ninh Bình
- Established: 16 June 2025
- Administrative headquarters: Văn Côi Hamlet

Area
  - Total: 21.56 km^{2} (8.32 sq mi)

Population (2025)
  - Total: 26,675
  - Density: 1,237/km^{2} (3,200/sq mi)
- Website: vuban.ninhbinh.gov.vn

Vụ Bản is a commune in Ninh Bình province, Vietnam. It is one of 129 new communes and wards in Ninh Bình province established as part of the 2025 Vietnamese administrative reforms. The commune inherited its name from the former Vụ Bản district, Nam Định province.

On 12 June 2025, the National Assembly of Vietnam adopted Resolution No. 202/2025/QH15 on the reorganization of provincial-level administrative units (effective from 12 June 2025). Under the resolution, Hà Nam province, Nam Định province, and Ninh Bình province were merged to form a new province named Ninh Bình.

On 16 June 2025:

- The National Assembly of Vietnam adopted Resolution No. 203/2025/QH15 amending and supplementing several articles of the Constitution of Vietnam (effective from 16 June 2025). Under the resolution, district-level administrative units nationwide ceased to operate from 1 July 2025.
- The Standing Committee of the National Assembly of Vietnam issued Resolution No. 1674/NQ-UBTVQH15 on the arrangement of commune-level administrative units in Ninh Bình province in 2025 (effective from 16 June 2025). Under the resolution, Gôi township, Kim Thái commune, and Tam Thanh commune were merged to form a new commune named Vụ Bản.
