= Nam Định =

- Ward
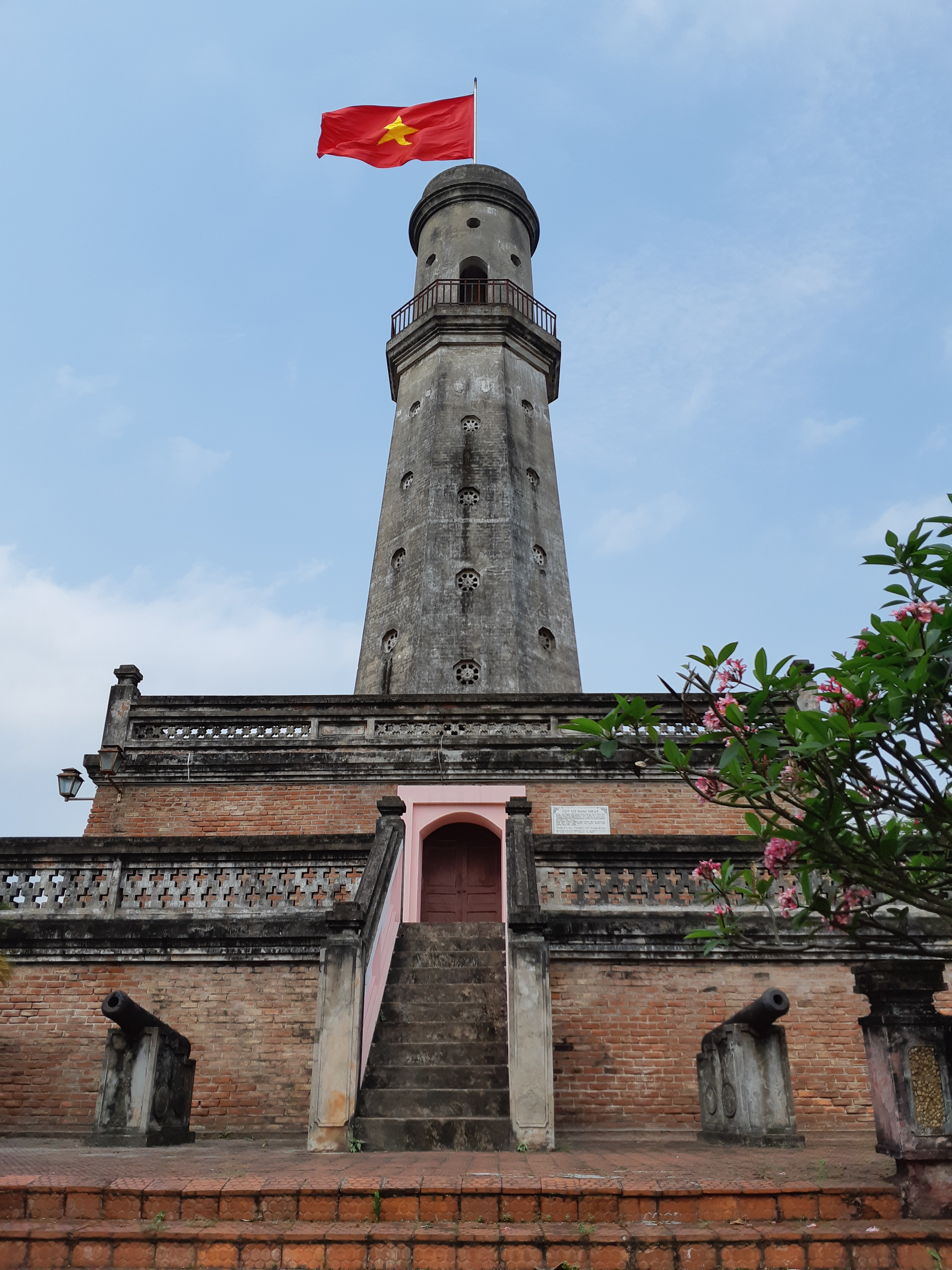
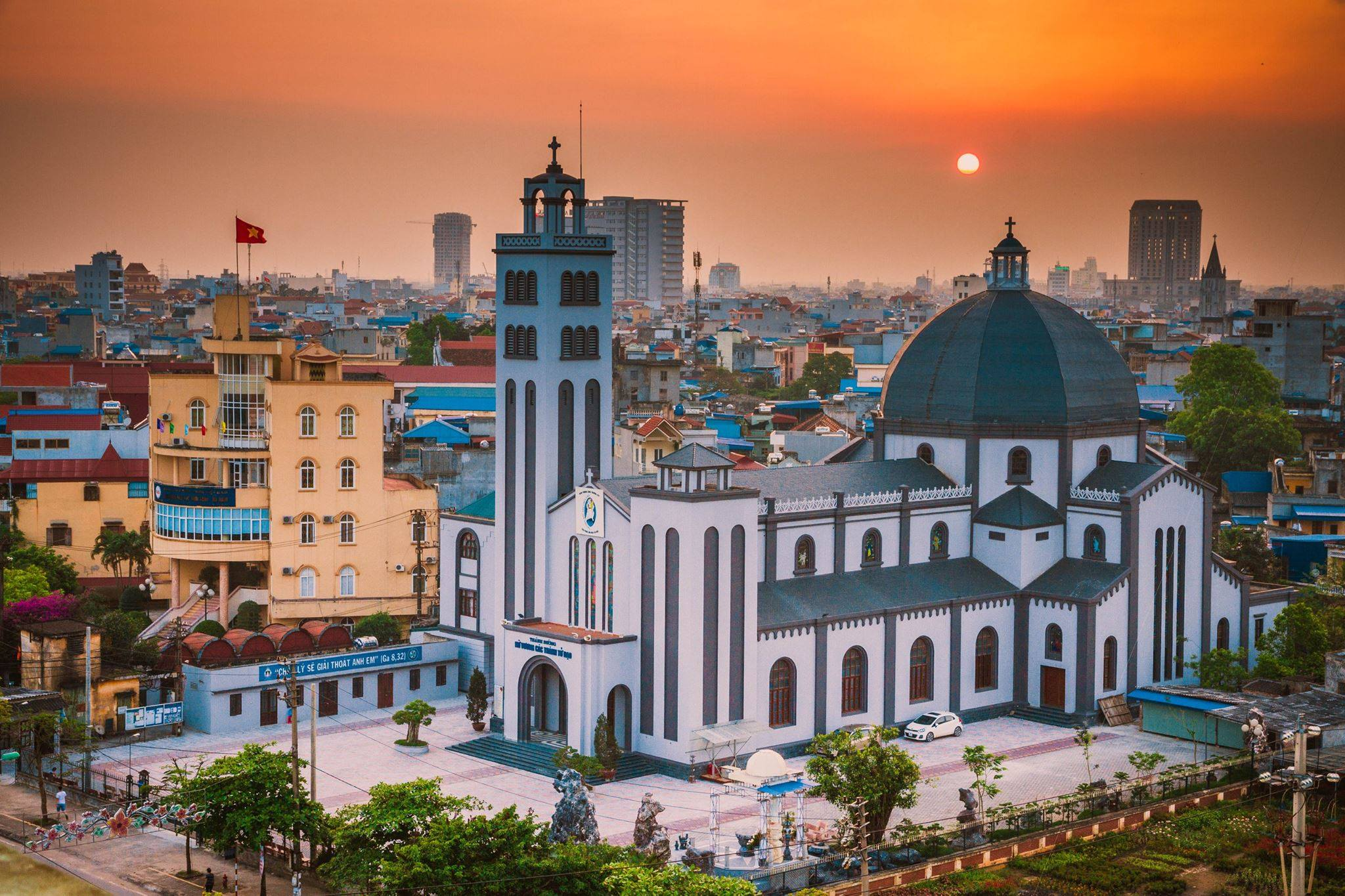
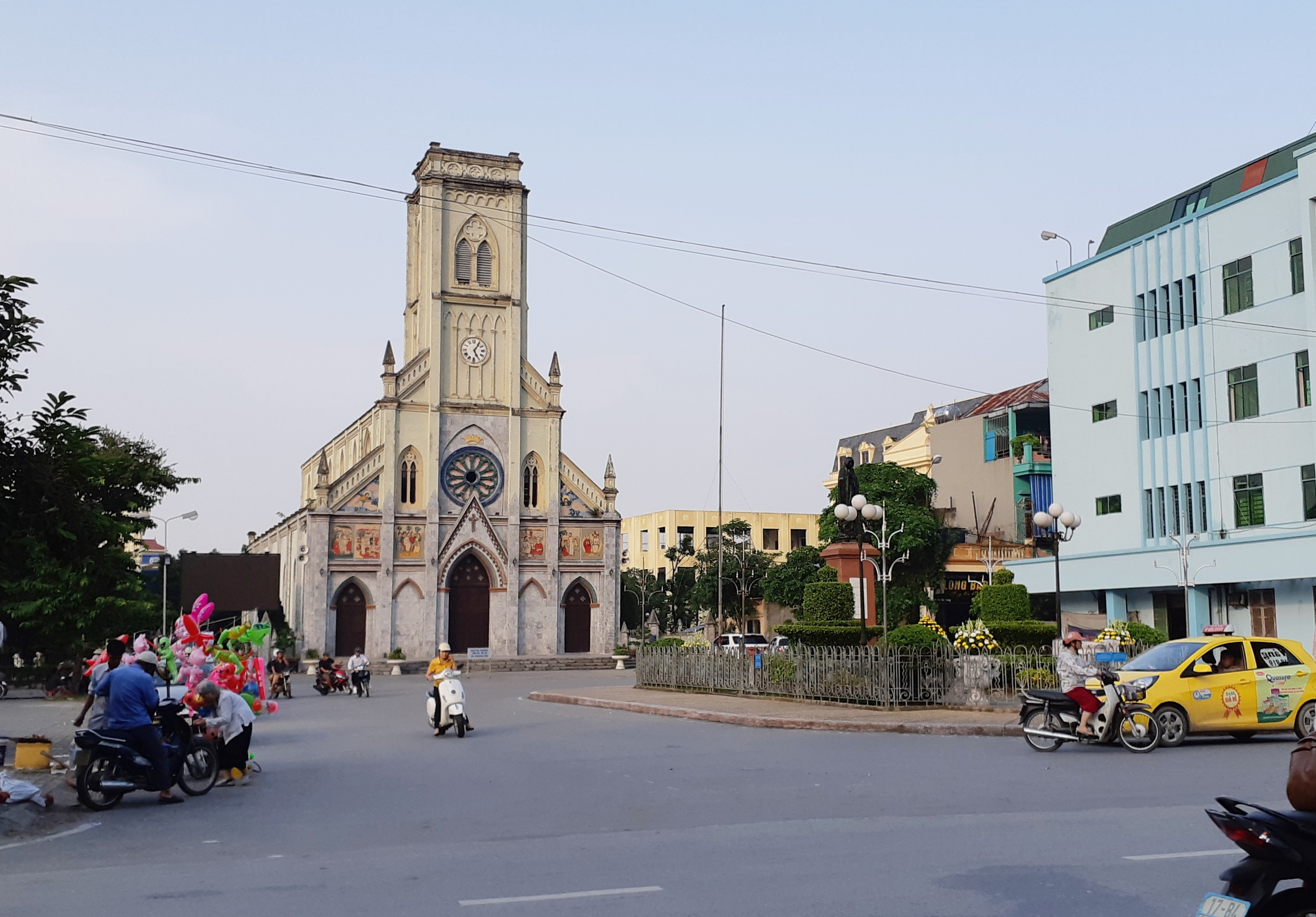
- Nam Định Flag Tower Trần Temple Khoái Đồng Church Nữ Vương Hòa Bình Square
- Interactive map of Nam Định
- Coordinates: 20.43942246441048°N 106.17166870681022°E
- Country: Vietnam
- Region: Red River Delta
- Province: Ninh Bình
- Established: 16 June 2025
- Administrative headquarters: 10 Trần Đăng Ninh Street

Area
  - Total: 19.91 km^{2} (7.69 sq mi)

Population (2025)
  - Total: 188,751
  - Density: 9,480/km^{2} (24,600/sq mi)
- Website: namdinh.ninhbinh.gov.vn

Nam Định is a ward in the northeastern part of Ninh Bình province, Vietnam. It is one of 129 new communes and wards in Ninh Bình province established as part of the 2025 Vietnamese administrative reforms. The ward inherited its name from the former Nam Định city and Nam Định province. It is also the most populous administrative unit in Ninh Bình province.

== History ==
The area of present-day Nam Định Ward was formerly part of Nam Định city, Nam Định province.

On 12 June] 2025, the National Assembly of Vietnam adopted Resolution No. 202/2025/QH15 on the reorganization of provincial-level administrative units, which merged Hà Nam province and Nam Định province into Ninh Bình province.

On 16 June 2025, the National Assembly of Vietnam adopted Resolution No. 203/2025/QH15 amending and supplementing several articles of the Constitution of Vietnam, which provided for the termination of district-level administrative units nationwide from 1 July 2025.

On the same date, the Standing Committee of the National Assembly of Vietnam issued Resolution No. 1674/NQ-UBTVQH15 on the arrangement of commune-level administrative units in Ninh Bình province in 2025. Under the resolution, the entire area and population of Cửa Bắc, Cửa Nam, Lộc Vượng, Lộc Vương, Năng Tĩnh, Quang Trung, Trần Hưng Đạo, and Vị Xuyên wards, together with Mỹ Phúc commune, formerly part of Nam Định city, were merged to form a new ward named Nam Định.
