= Hà Nam province =

Province of Vietnam

- Province
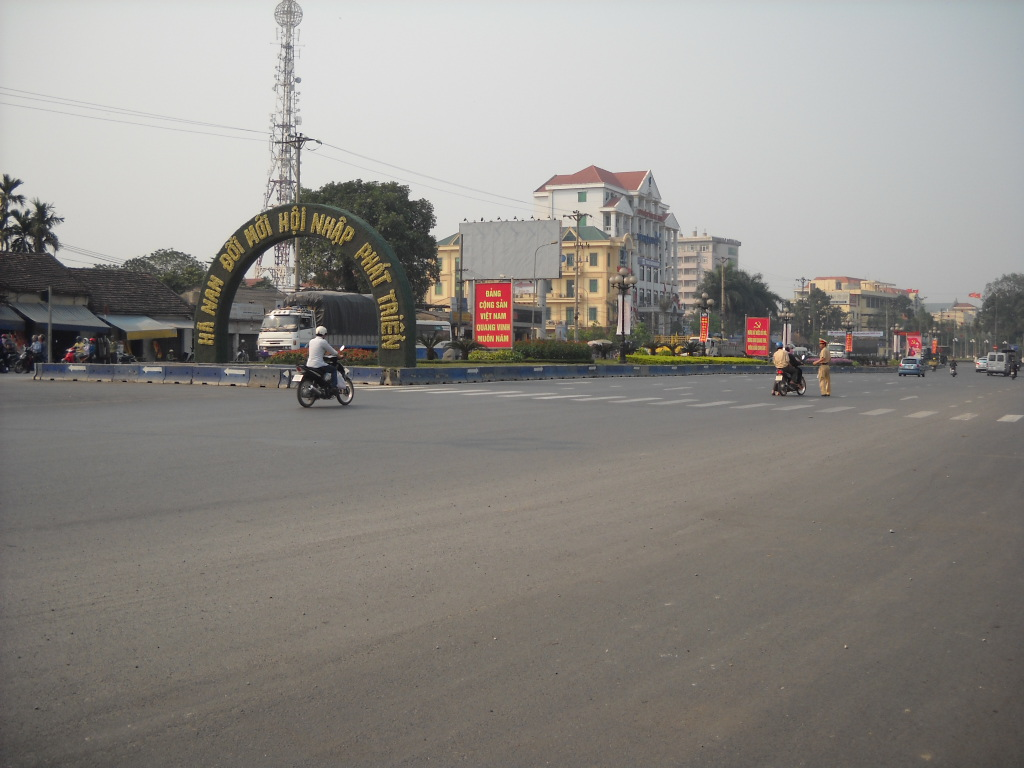
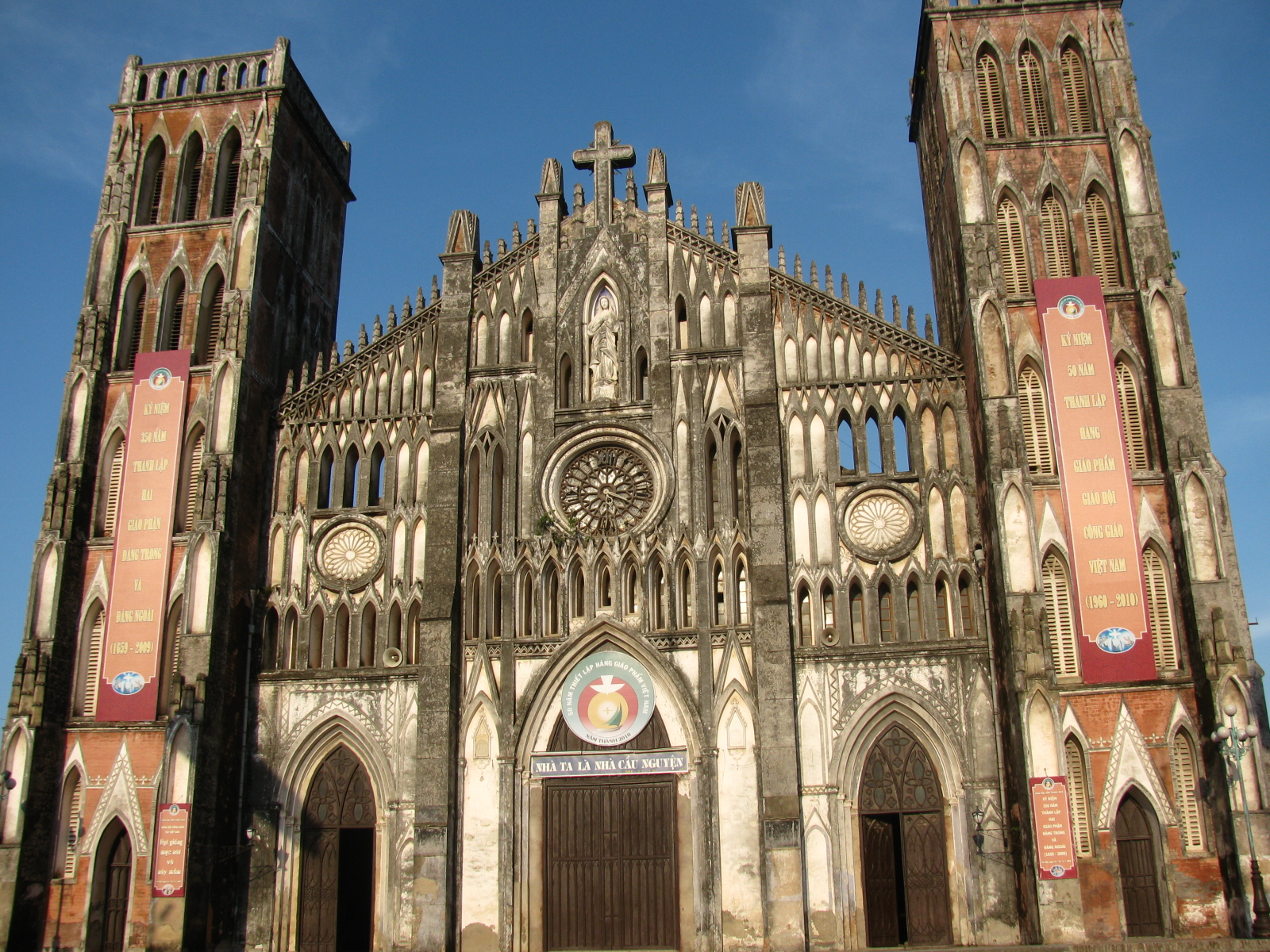
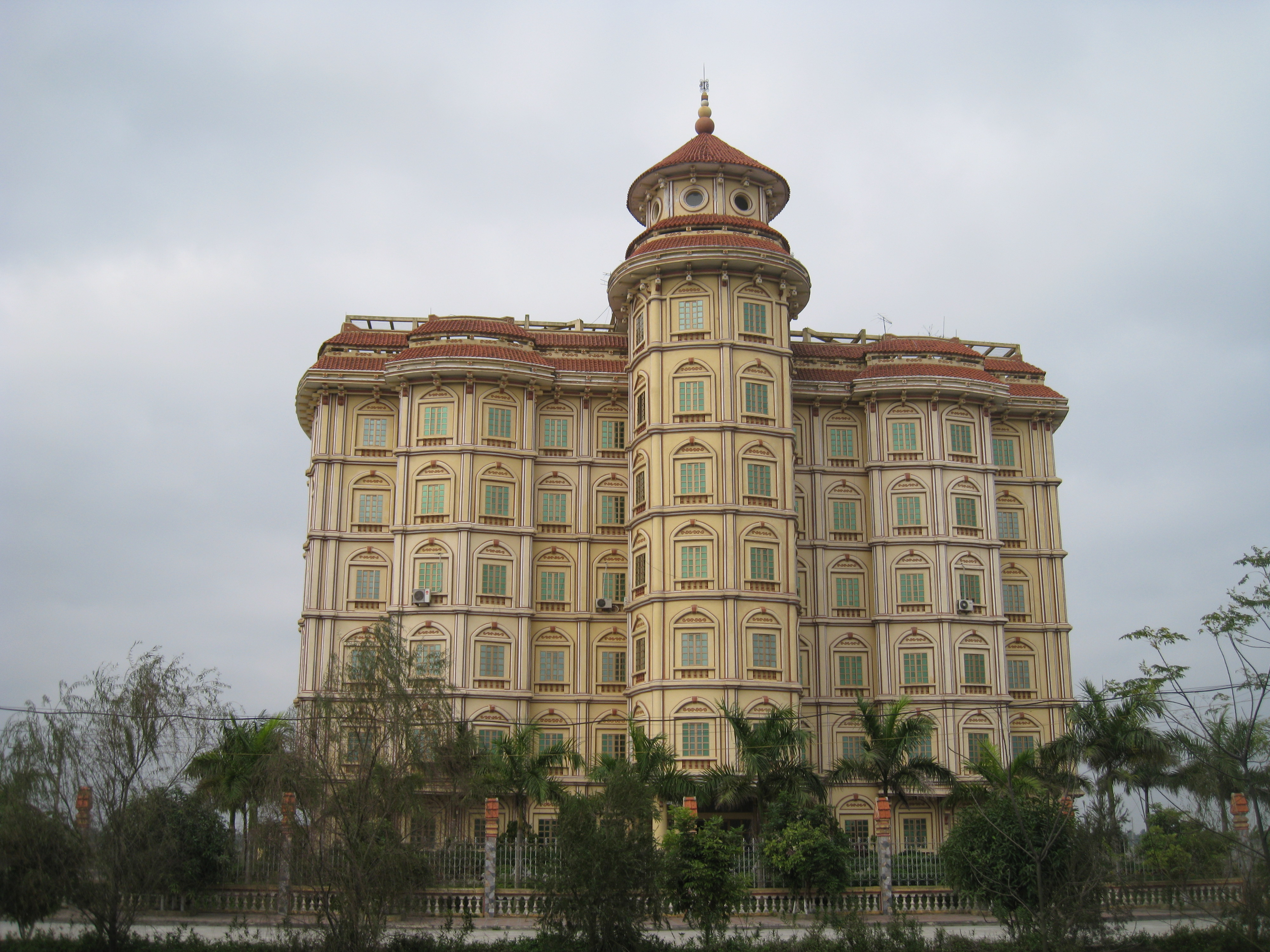
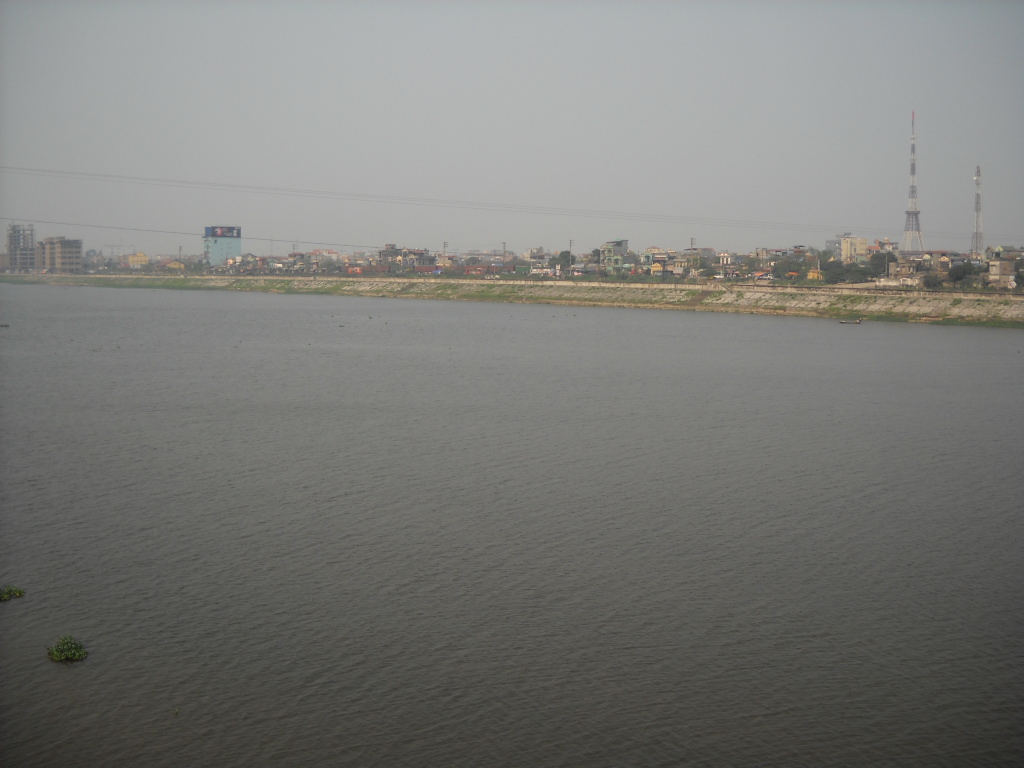
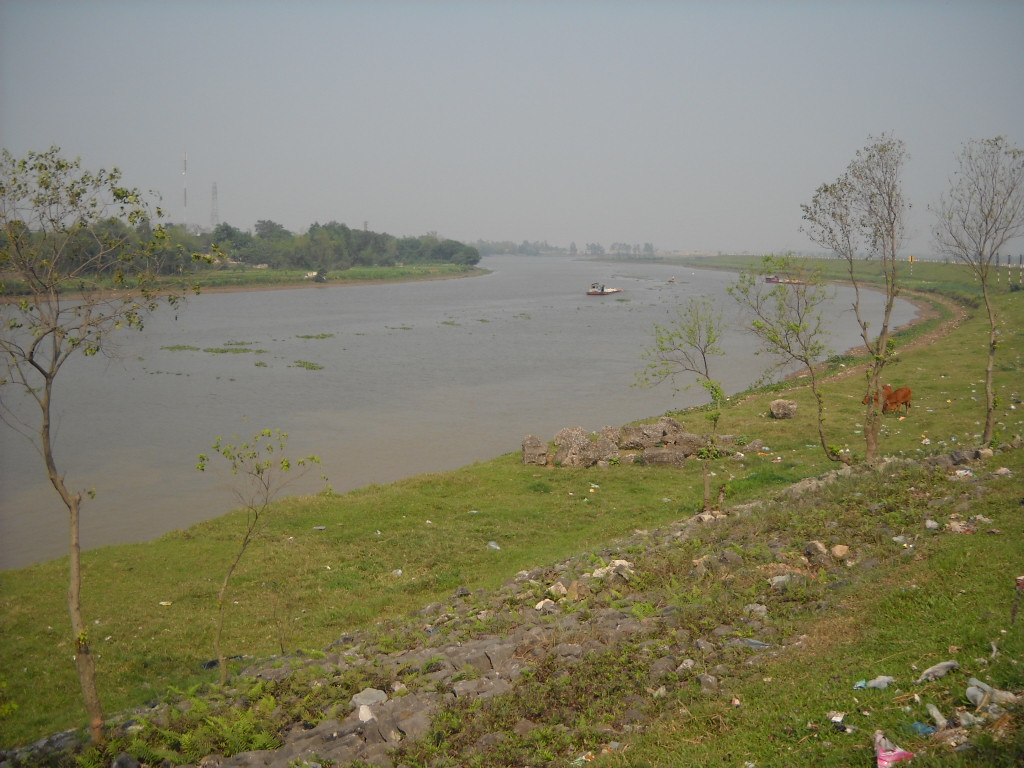
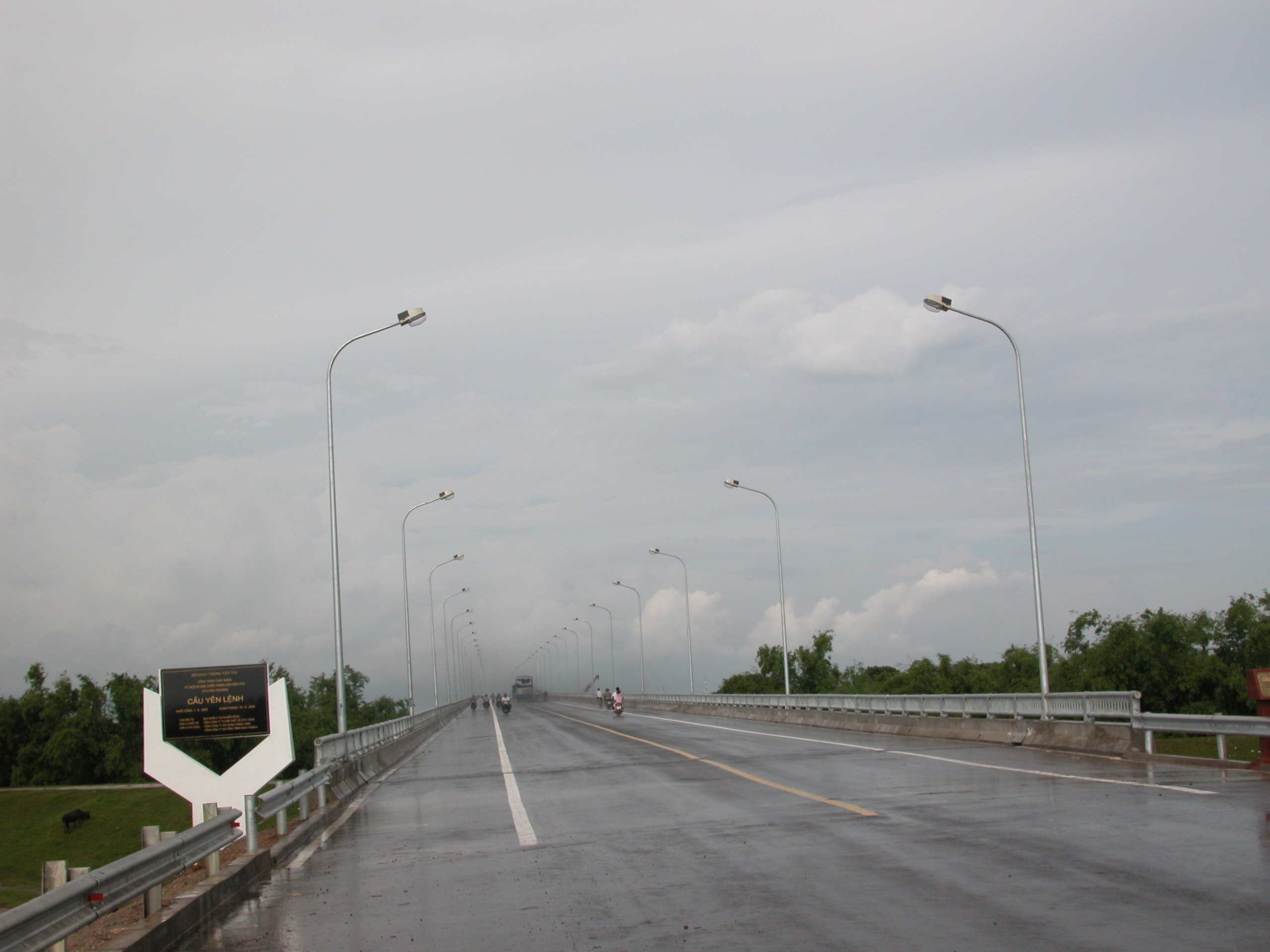
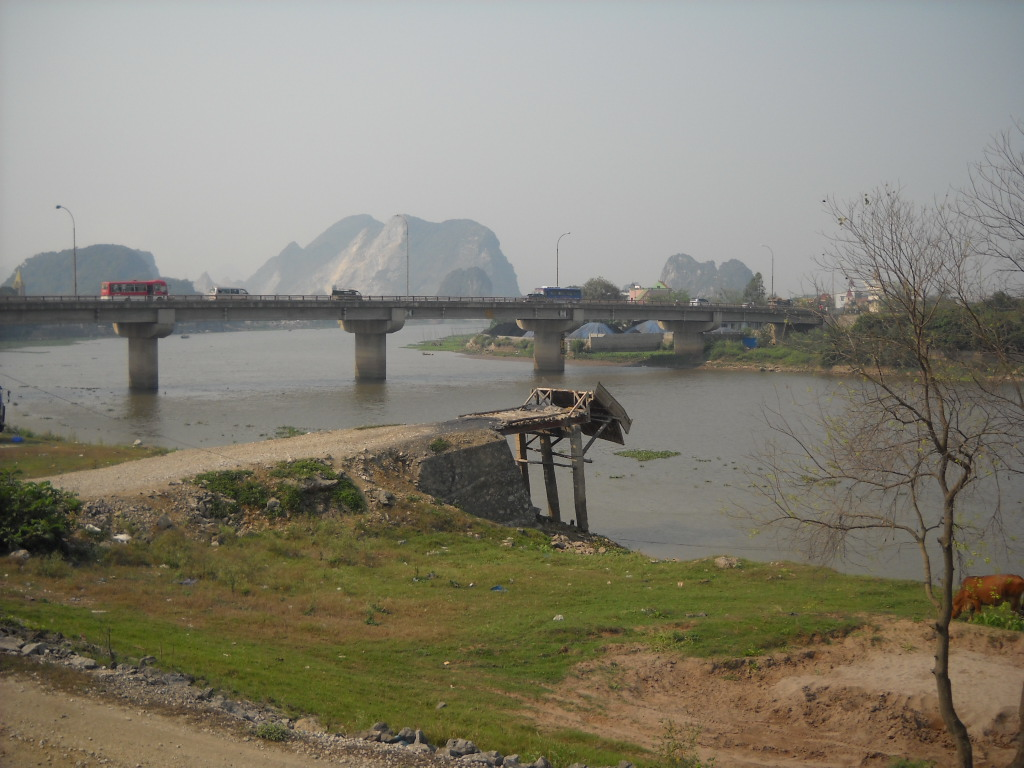
- Phủ Lý City • Bà-banh Temple • Sở Kiện Cathedral • Hà Hoa Tiên University • Đáy River • Yên Lệnh Bridge • Đoan Vỹ Bridge

- Seal
- Nickname: "Bananaland" (Đồng Chuối)
- Location of Hà Nam within Vietnam
- Coordinates: 20°35′N 106°0′E
- Country: Vietnam
- Region: Red River Delta
- Central agency: Phủ Lý city

Government
  - People's Council Chair: Tăng Văn Phả
  - People's Committee Chair: Đinh Văn Cường

Area
  - Total: 861.93 km^{2} (332.79 sq mi)

Population (2025),
  - Total: 1,013,705
  - Density: 1,176.1/km^{2} (3,046.1/sq mi)

Demographics
  - Ethnicities: Kinh, Tày-Nùng, Mường, Hoa

GDP
  - Total: VND 44.613 trillion US$1.938 billion
- Time zone: UTC+7 (ICT)
- Area codes: 226
- ISO 3166 code: VN-63
- HDI (2020): ▲0.759 (13th)
- Website: hanam.gov.vn

Hà Nam was a former province of northern Vietnam, in the Red River Delta. It was dissolved and merged with Ninh Bình province on 12 June 2025.

== History ==
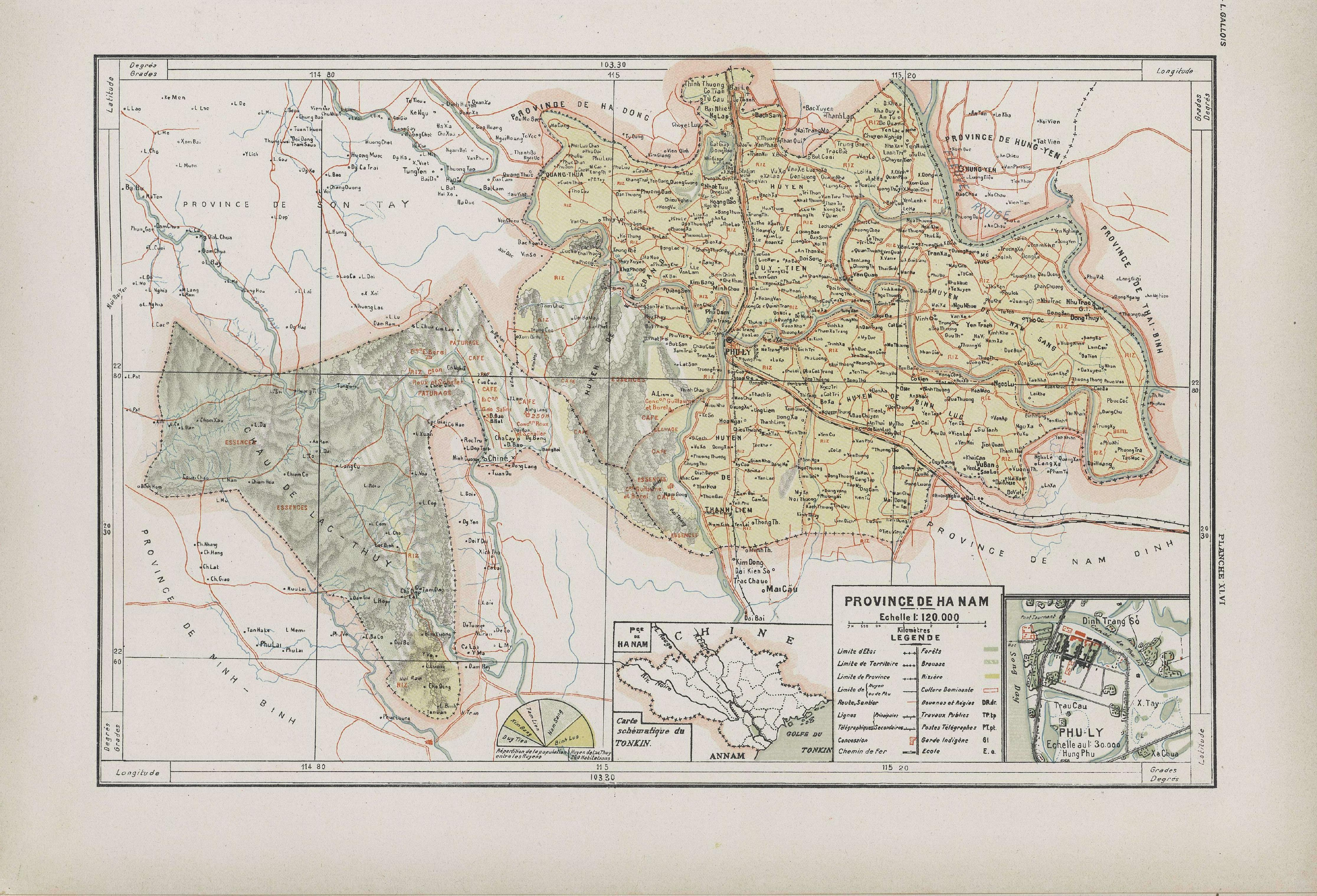
Map of Ha Nam province in 1909

Its name Hà-nam (河 南) means "the south of the river", but it was only grafted from Hà-nội and Nam-định by the French administrative managers about the early of the 20th century. The territory of this province is not located in the South of any river in fact.

Hà Nam, and Vietnam as a whole, implemented the second five-year plan between 1975 and 1980. This plan included protecting the country's national border and gradually overcoming difficulties within the country itself. Between 1981 and 1985, the administration attempted to improve the society and culture of Vietnam.

== Geography ==
Hà Nam is subdivided into six district-level sub-divisions :

- 3 districts:
  - Bình Lục
  - Lý Nhân
  - Thanh Liêm
- 1 provincial city:
  - Phủ Lý
- 2 town:
  - Duy Tiên
  - Kim Bảng

They are further subdivided into four commune-level towns (or townlets), 65 communes, and 29 wards.

== See also ==
- Nam Định
- Ninh Bình
- Hưng Yên
