= Giao Phúc =

Commune in Ninh Bình, Vietnam

Coordinates: 20.2327°N 106.4791°E

Giao Phúc (xã Giao Phúc) is a commune in Ninh Bình, Vietnam approximately 150 km South-East of Hanoi. It has a population of 10,000 people.

The main source of income of the people of Giao Phúc comes from marine life. Being 40% Christian, there is a collection of churches around the village. The other predominant religion is Buddhism.

== Xuan Thuy National Park ==
In January 1989, Xuân Thủy National Park was declared Vietnam's first Ramsar site; a wetland of international importance. The Xuan Thuy Nature Reserve was established in 1995 and was upgraded to a national park in 2003.

Located in the Giao Thuy district forming part of the UNESCO Red River Biosphere Reserve, it is a rich, biodiverse, coastal wetland that houses about 220 species of birds (including 9 endangered species), 110 aquatic plants and 500 other aquatic organisms. Many highly valuable types of seafood like shellfish, shrimps, fish, crabs and oysters are also found in this area. It is also a critically important staging area and wintering area for migratory birds visiting and passing through Vietnam from northeast Asia and Siberia to Australia.

== Visiting ==
It is possible to visit Giao Xuan and do a homestay with a local family in a traditional home. There is a twice-daily bus that runs directly between Hanoi and Giao Xuan. Most homes have hot water and western toilets. The people eat typical Vietnamese food including seafood, pork, rice, and fish sauce.

The town has a:
Nuoc Mam (Fish Sauce) Making House. Fish sauce is the one ingredient that is quintessentially Vietnamese and it lends a distinctive character to Vietnamese cooking. The sauce is made by fermenting highly salted fish in large ceramic vats for four to twelve months.

Rice Wine House: In Vietnamese culture, rice wine is typically enjoyed with every meal. It is customary to invite the whole table to drink simultaneously. Most households produce their own rice wine resulting in each batch varying in alcoholic strength.

Jellyfish processing: The jellyfish are freshly caught and brought to the local processing plant and prepared for export or local consumption.

Churches and pagodas

Cultural performances

Local marketplace

Near to Giao Xuan is the Xuan Thuy National Park which can be visited by boat along the Vop River or by foot through mangrove forests.

During migration and staging seasons, rare species of birds like spoon-billed sandpiper (Calidris pygmeus), Nordmann's greenshank (Tringa guttifer), grey-headed lapwing (Vanellus cinereus) and Asian dowitcher (Limnodromus semipalmatus) reside in the park.

Eleven species of birds, found within the project area, are listed as globally threatened or near-threatened, including the endangered spotted greenshank (Tringa guttifer), the spoon-billed sandpiper (Eurynorhynchus pygmeus), and the black-faced spoonbill (Platalea minor), the near-threatened Asia dowitcher (Limnodromus semipalmatus), the black-headed ibis (Threskiornis melanocephalus), the painted stork (Mycteria leucoephala) and the Japanese paradise-flycatcher (Terpsiphone atrocaudata), the least-concerned grey-headed lapwing (Vanellus cinereus), and the vulnerable Saunder's gull (Larus saundersi), the Chinese egret (Egretta eulophotes), and the spot-billed pelican (Pelecanus philippensis).

Rare globally listed mammals existing in the park include the fishing cat (Felis viverrinus) and the finless porpoise (Neophocaera phocaenoides), as well as locally listed dolphin species.
