= Madushan Dam =

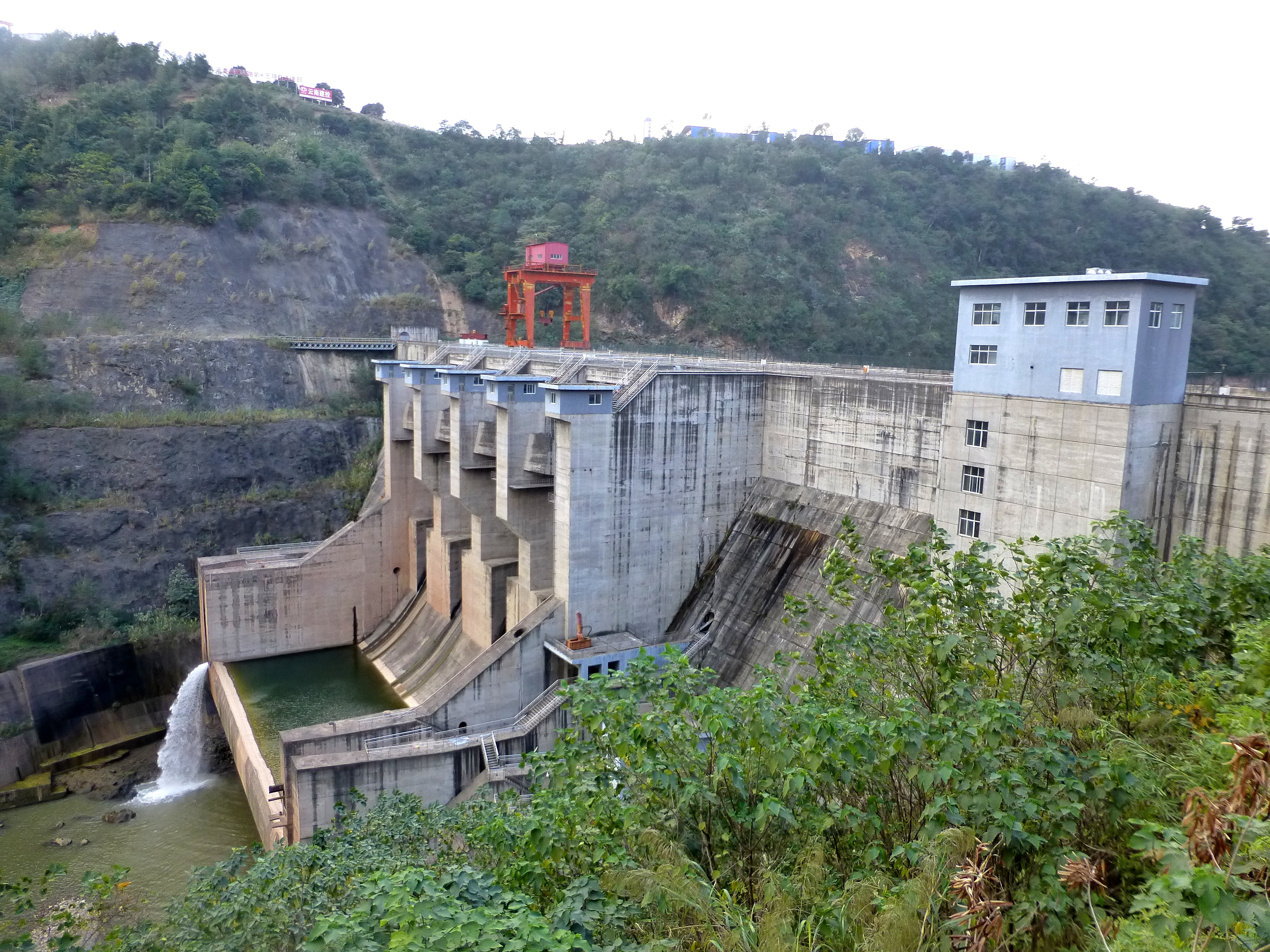

- Location within China
- Official name: 红河马堵山水电站 (Honghe Madushan shuidianzhan)
- Country: China
- Location: Gejiu City and Jinping County, Honghe Prefecture, Yunnan Province
- Coordinates: 23°2′45.52″N 103°17′4.79″E
- Purpose: Power
- Status: Operational
- Construction began: 2007
- Opening date: 2011; 15 years ago

Dam and spillways
- Type of dam: Gravity
- Impounds: Honghe (Red) River
- Height: 105.5 m (346 ft)

Reservoir
- Total capacity: 551,000,000 m^{3} (446,703 acre⋅ft)
- Surface area: 19.2 km^{2} (7.4 mi^{2})

Madushan Hydropower Plant
- Commission date: 2011
- Type: Conventional
- Turbines: 3 x 100 MW Francis-type
- Installed capacity: 300 MW

The Madushan Dam is a gravity dam on the Honghe (Red) River in Honghe Hani and Yi Autonomous Prefecture of Yunnan Province.

The name of the dam comes from the nearby village of Madushan, located on the left bank of the river upstream from the dam. Madushan village is administratively under Manhao Town (which itself located a few kilometers downstream of the dam) of Gejiu City of Honghe Prefecture; the opposite, right bank of the river is in Jinping Miao, Yao, and Dai Autonomous County of the same Honghe Prefecture.

The primary purpose of the dam is hydroelectric power production and it supports a 300 MW power station. Construction on the dam began in 2007 and its generators were commissioned in 2011.

== See also ==
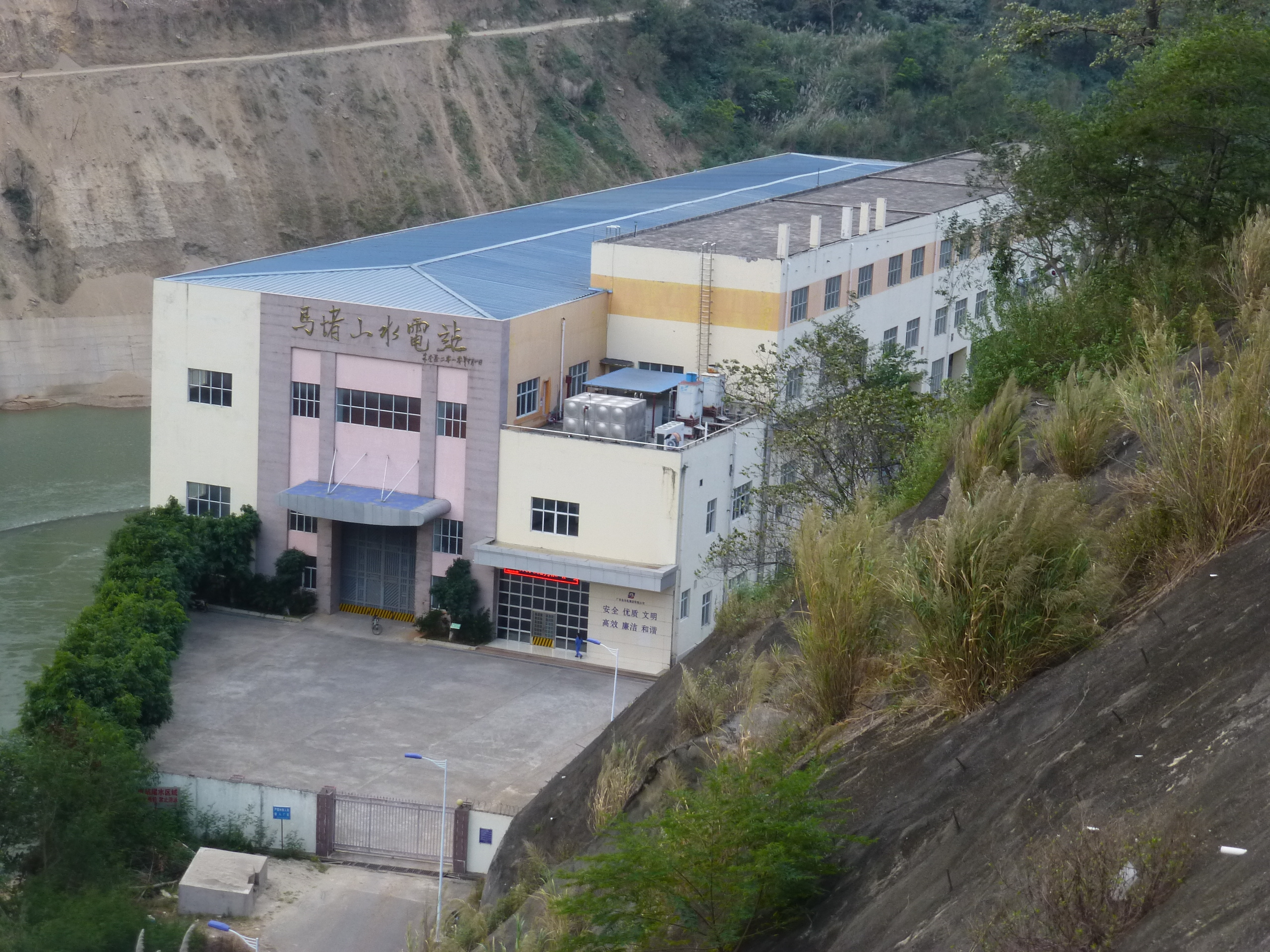
The generating station

- List of dams and reservoirs in China
- List of tallest dams in China
