= Manhao =

Town in China

Coordinates: 23°01′05″N 103°20′51″E

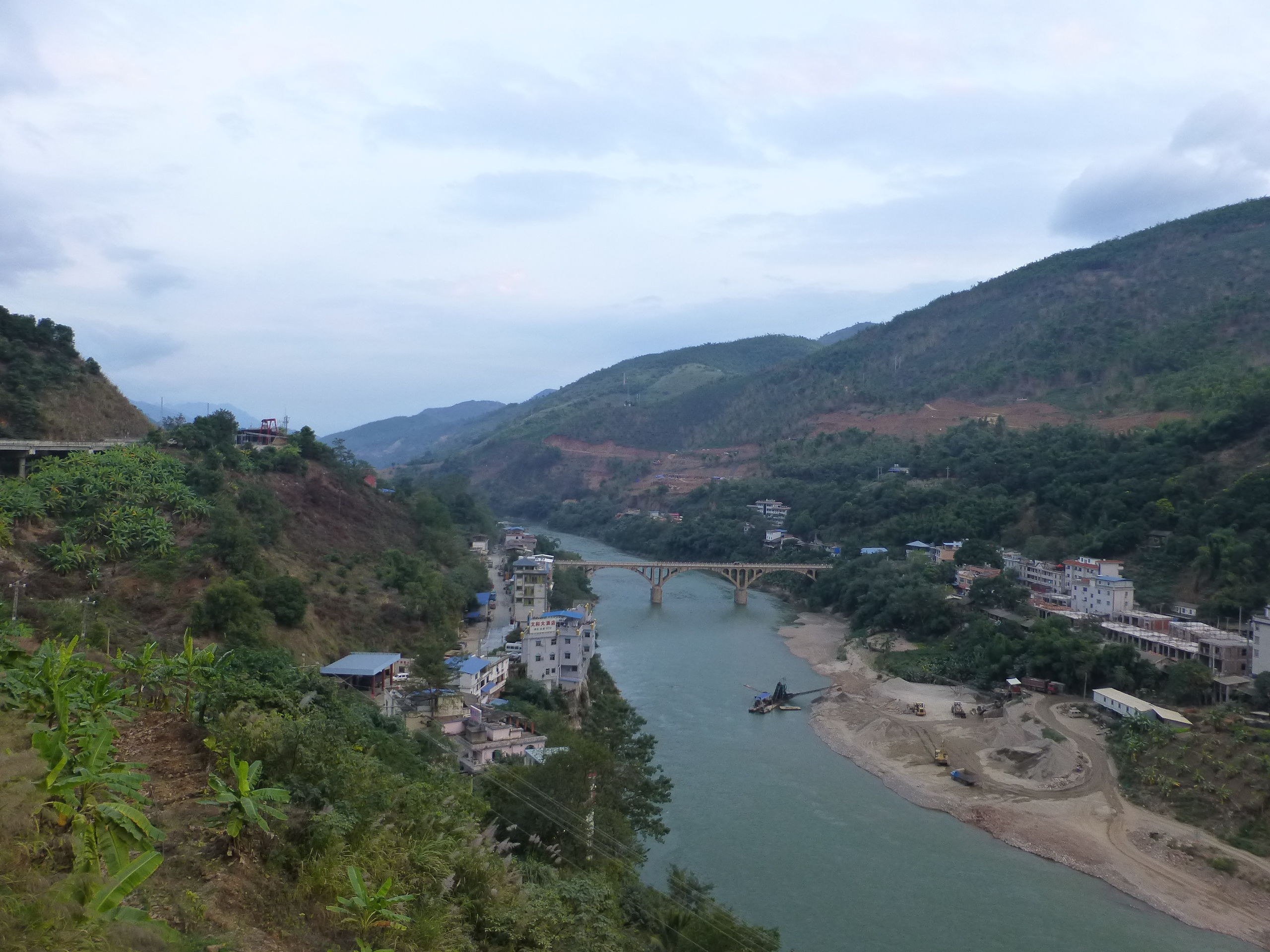
Manhao, in the valley of the Red River, seen from the northwest

Manhao (Chinese: 蔓耗; pinyin: Mànhào) is a town in Gejiu County-level city of Yunnan Province of China.

== History ==
Located on the Red River, Manhao was a transhipment point of some significance prior to construction of the Kunming–Hai Phong Railway in the early 20th century, as the shortest route between Kunming and French Indochina ran through it. Manhao was considered the head of small-boat (junk, or wupan 五版) navigation on the Red River; so Yunnan's products such as tin would be brought to Manhao by pack mules, where they would be loaded to boats.

In those days, to travel from Hai Phong (which was the closest sea port to Kunming) to Kunming, one would need 28 days: it involved 16 days of travel by steamer and then a small boat up the Red River to Manhao (684 kilometers (425 mi)), and then 12 days overland (312 kilometers (194 mi)) to Kunming.

== Economy ==
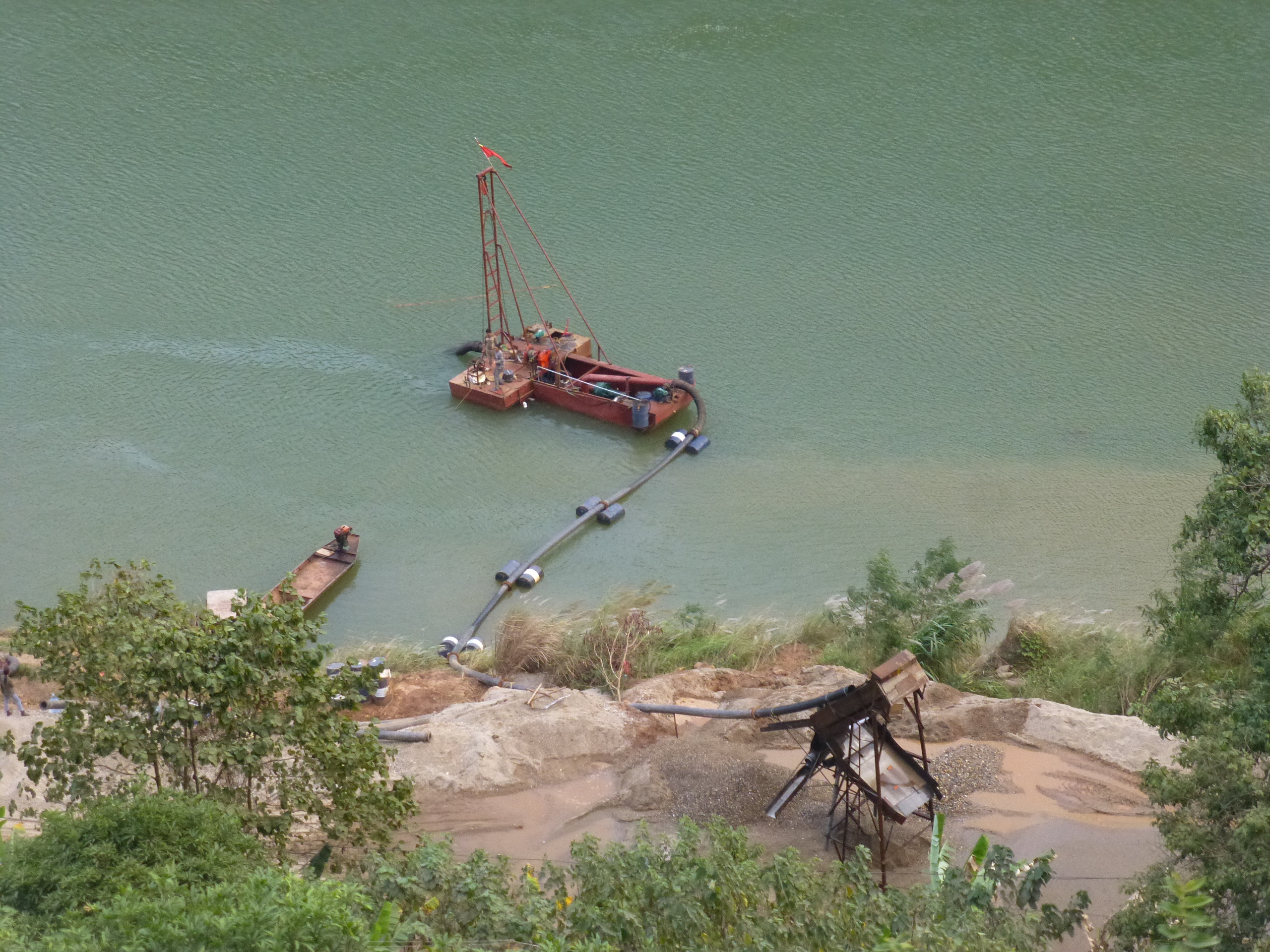
A typical sand mining operation in the Red River near Manhao

The Madushan Dam is located a few kilometers upstream from Manhao; the dam is named after the nearby Madushan Village.

Two bridges span the Red River in Manhao. The high Manhao Bridge is a few kilometers upstream from the town; it carries Yunnan State Route 212 (S212). Another, low, bridge is in the town itself.

The Red River around Manhao is not navigable for modern commercial ships (and the Madushan Dam, upstream of the town, has no ship lock), but numerous dredges, both upstream and downstream from Manhao, extract sand from its bottom for use in construction.

== See also ==
- List of township-level divisions of Yunnan
