= Red River (Asia) =

River in southwest China and northern Vietnam

Red River Hong River
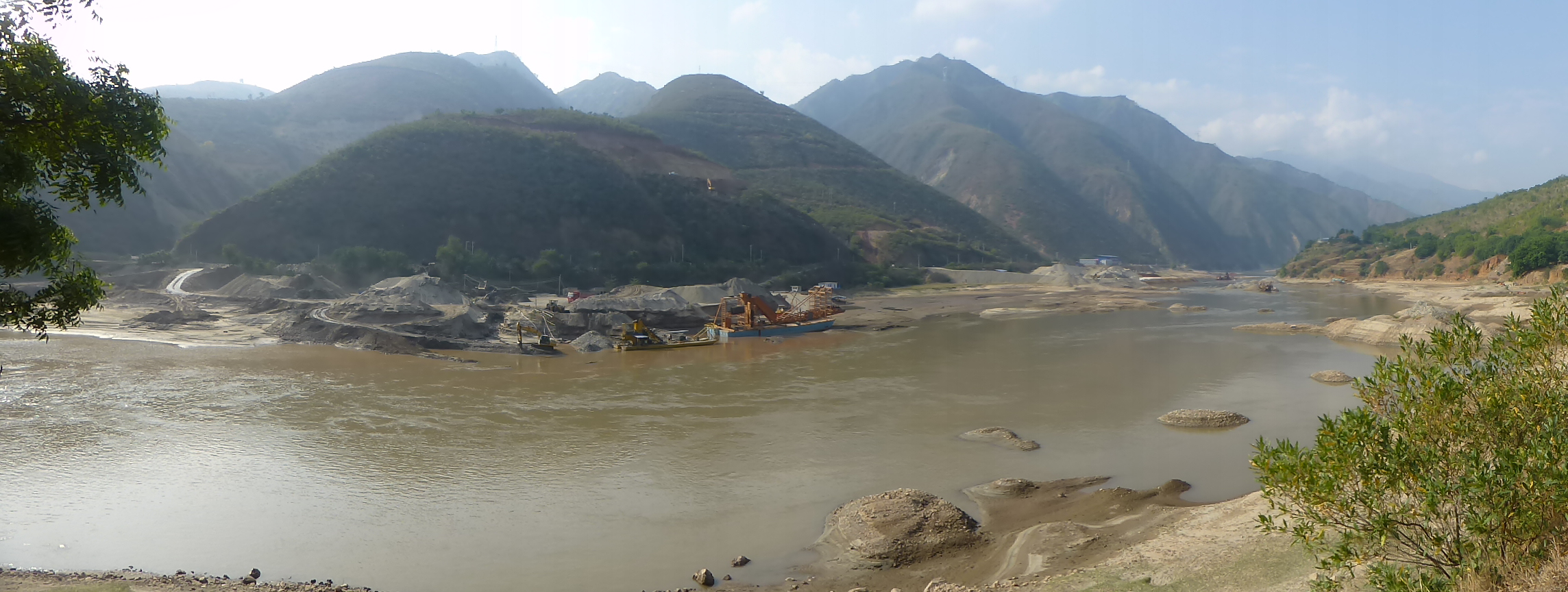
- Red River in Yuanyang County/Gejiu City, Yunnan

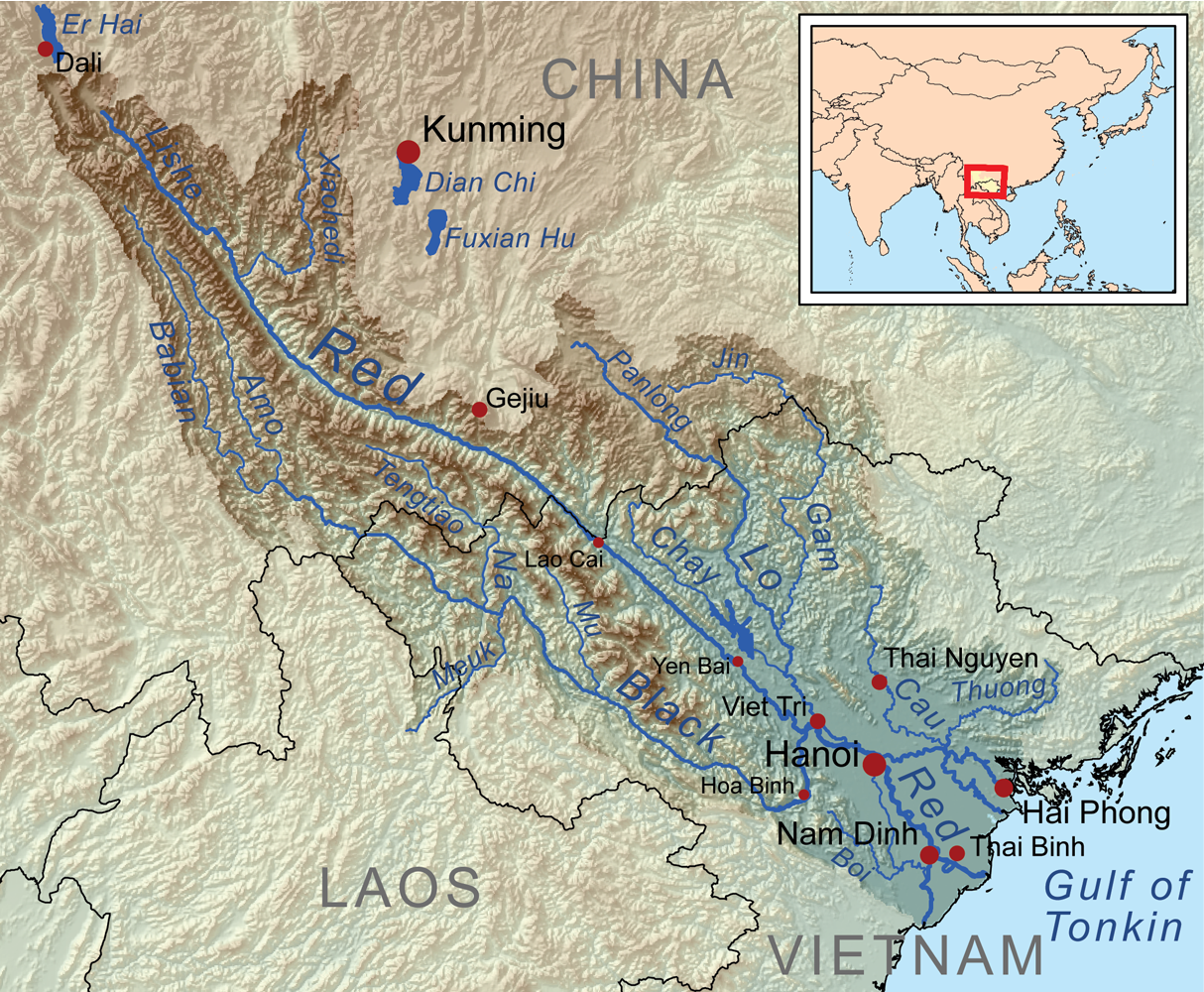
- Red River and its tributaries.

Location
- Country: China, Vietnam
- Provinces: Yunnan Province (China), Lào Cai province, Phú Thọ province, Hanoi, Hưng Yên province

Physical characteristics
- Source
  - location: Hengduan Mountains, Weishan, Dali, Yunnan, China
  - elevation: 1,776 m (5,827 ft)
- 2nd source
  - location: TBD, Xiangyun, Dali, Yunnan, China
- Mouth: Ba Lạt
  - location: (boundary between Tiền Hải and Giao Thủy)
  - coordinates: 20°14′43″N 106°35′20″E
  - elevation: 0 m (0 ft)
- Length: 1,149 km (714 mi)
- Basin size: 143,600 km^{2} (55,400 sq mi) 169,000 km^{2} (65,000 mi^{2})
- Discharge
  - location: Red River Delta, Gulf of Tonkin, Vietnam
  - average: 4,300 m^{3}/s (150,000 cu ft/s)
  - minimum: 1,200 m^{3}/s (42,000 cu ft/s) 700 m^{3}/s (25,000 cu ft/s)
  - maximum: 35,000 m^{3}/s (1,200,000 cu ft/s) 9,500 m^{3}/s (340,000 cu ft/s)
- Discharge
  - location: Việt Trì
  - average: 900 m^{3}/s (32,000 cu ft/s)

Basin features
- Tributaries
  - left: Nanxi, Lô
  - right: Đà

Red River
- Traditional Chinese: 紅河
- Simplified Chinese: 红河
Transcriptions
Standard Mandarin
- Hanyu Pinyin: Hóng Hé
Yue: Cantonese
- Jyutping: hung4 ho4

Alternative Chinese name
- Chinese: 元江
Transcriptions
Standard Mandarin
- Hanyu Pinyin: Yuán Jiāng
Yue: Cantonese
- Jyutping: jyun4 gong1

- Red River
- Vietnamese alphabet: Sông Hồng; Sông Cái; Sông Thao; Nhị Hà
- Chữ Hán: 滝紅 滝丐 滝洮 珥河

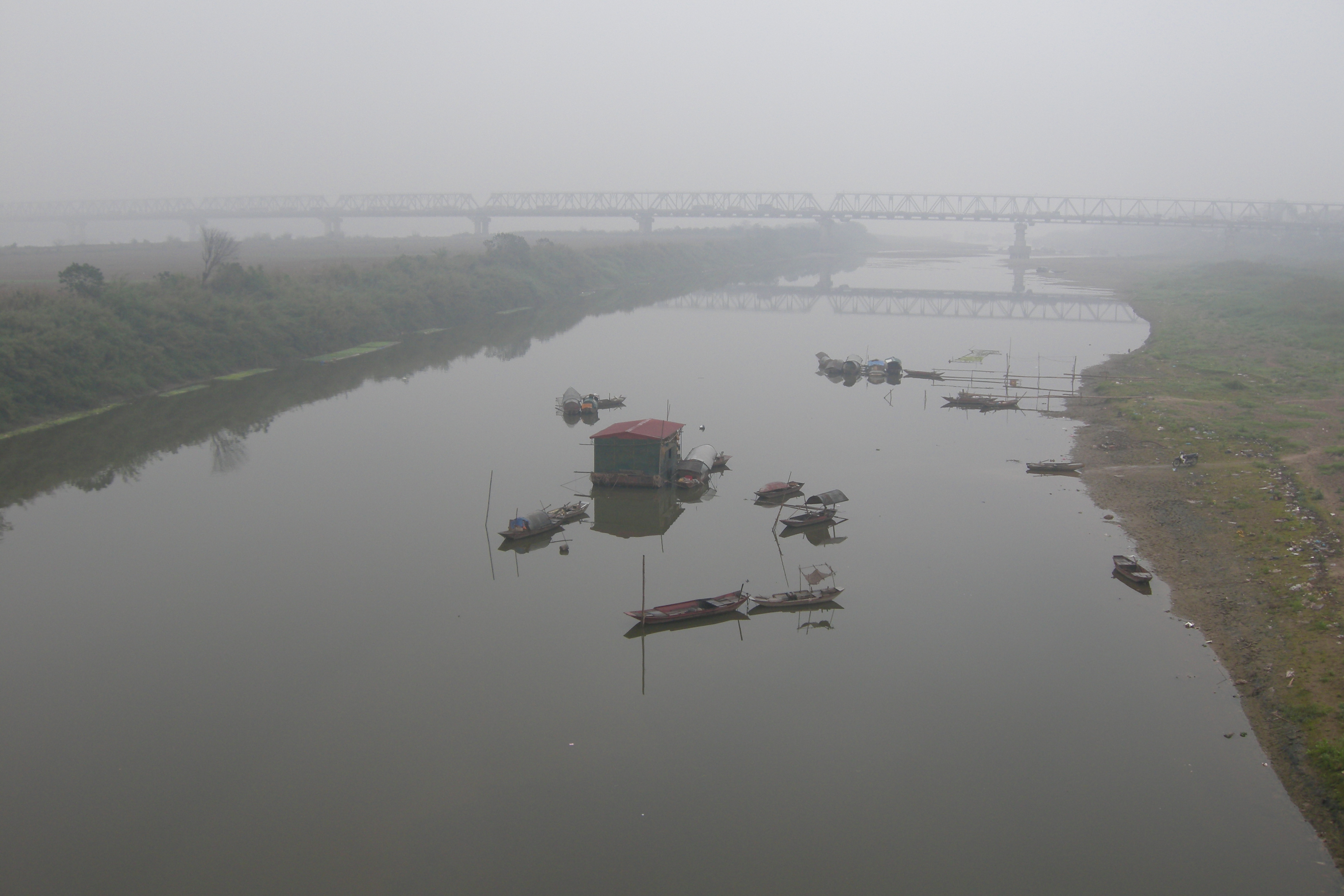
Hong River in fog, Hanoi, Vietnam.

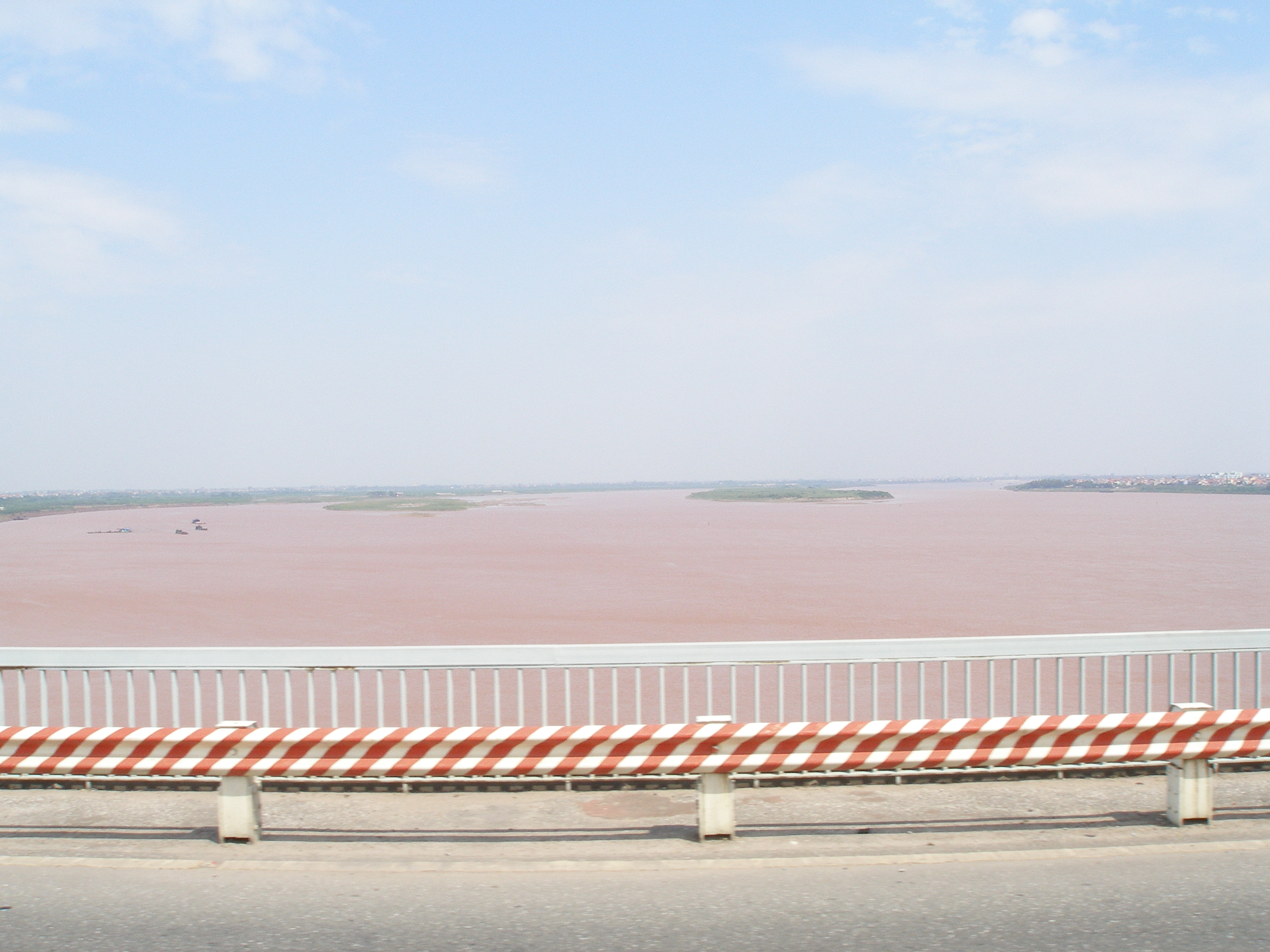
The reddish-brown heavily silt-laden water gives the river its name. View from bridge in Hanoi, Vietnam

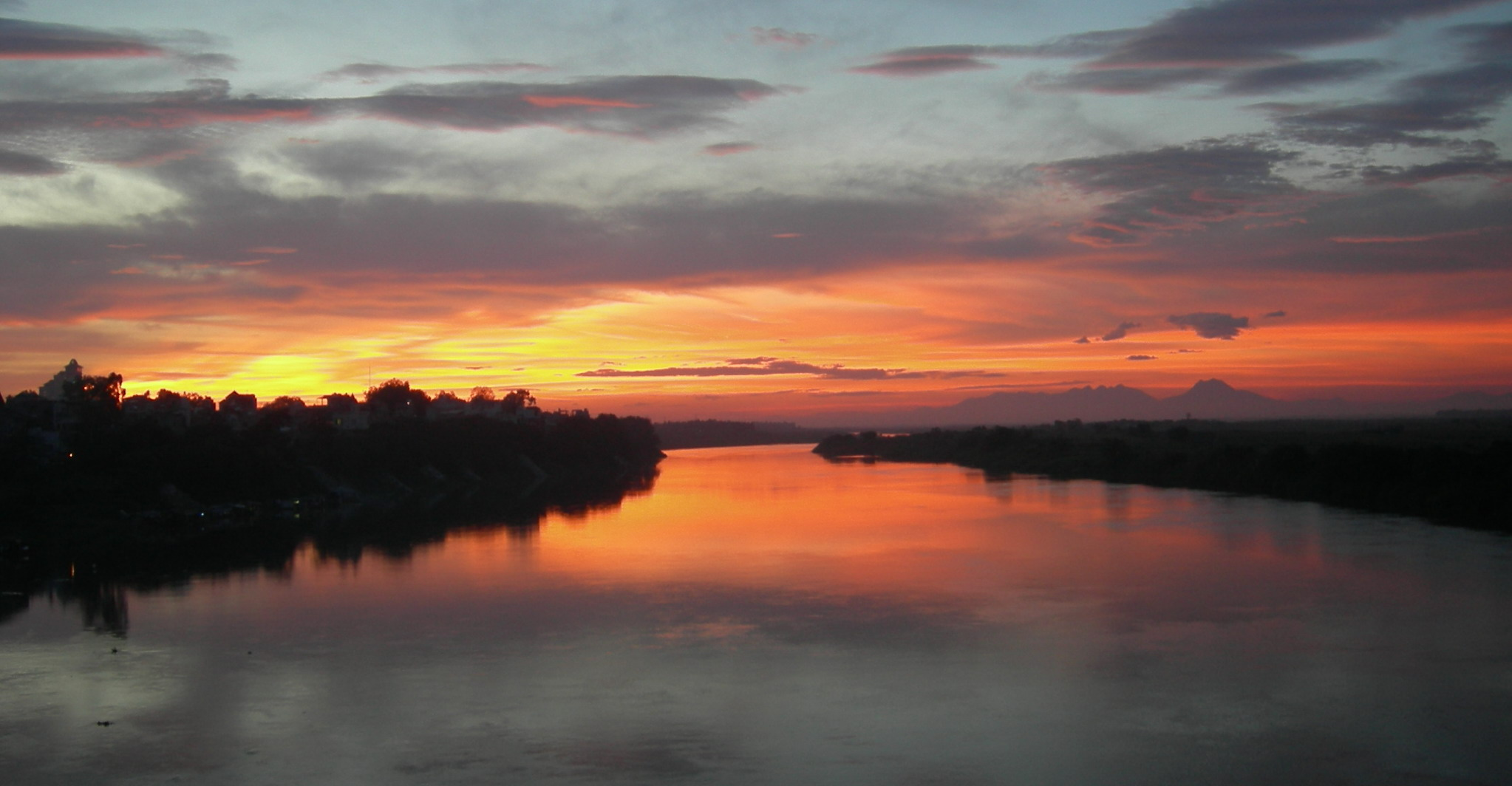
Sunset over Hong River, view from Long Bien Bridge, Hanoi, Vietnam

The Red River or the Hong River (traditional Chinese: 紅河; simplified Chinese: 红河; pinyin: Hóng Hé; Vietnamese: Sông Hồng; Chữ Nôm: 瀧紅), also known as the Sông Cái (lit. "Main River"; Chữ Nôm: 瀧丐) in Vietnamese and the Yuan River (元江, Yuán Jiāng) in Chinese, is a 1,149 km (714 mi) river that flows from Yunnan province, in Southwestern China, through northern Vietnam to the Gulf of Tonkin. According to C. Michael Hogan, the associated Red River Fault was instrumental in forming the entire South China Sea at least as early as 37 million years ago. The name red and southern position in China are associated in traditional cardinal directions. The river is relatively shallow and carries a lot of reddish silt along its way, which makes it give a red-brown color.

== Geography ==
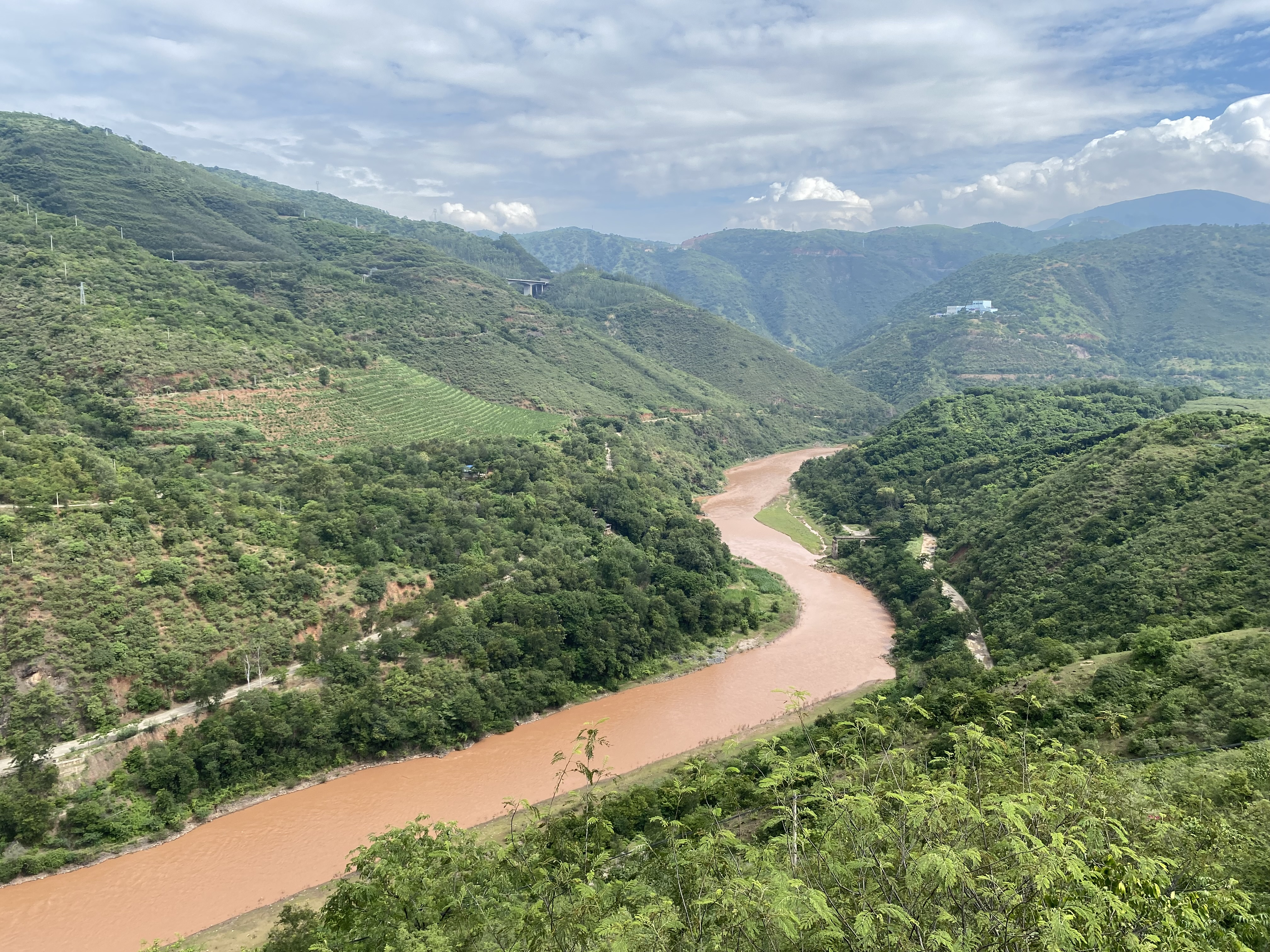
The upper stretches of the Red River, known as the Yuan River, in Yuanjiang County, Yunnan

The Red River begins in China's Yunnan province, in the mountains south of Dali. Main headstreams Leqiu River, Xi River and Juli River confluence at Nanjian where they form the Lishe River. The Lishe River meets with another headstream, the Yijie River, at Hongtupo, Chuxiong Prefecture. The river is commonly known as the Yuan (元江) until it reaches Honghe Prefecture. It flows generally southeastly, passes through the Yi and Dai ethnic minority areas, and leaves China through Yunnan's Honghe Autonomous Prefecture. It enters Vietnam in Lào Cai province and forms a portion of the international border between China and Vietnam. The river, known as Thao River for this upper stretch, continues its southeasterly course through northwestern Vietnam before it emerges from the mountains to reach the midlands. Its main tributaries, the Black River (Da River) and Lô River, join in to form the very broad Hồng near the city of Việt Trì, Phú Thọ province.

Downstream from Việt Trì, the river and its main distributaries, the Đuống River, Kinh Thầy River, Bạch Đằng River, and the Thái Bình river system, spread out to form the Red River Delta. The Red River flows past the Vietnamese capital of Hanoi before emptying into the Gulf of Tonkin. Its estuary is an important Ramsar site and forms the main part of the Xuân Thủy National Park.

The reddish-brown river gets its name from being heavily silt-laden. The Red River is notorious for its violent floods and its seasonally-wide volume fluctuations. The intense seasonal floods are made worse by erosion, development, and pollution. The delta is a major agricultural area of Vietnam with vast area devoted to rice. The land is protected by an elaborate network of dikes and levees.

== Travel and transportation route ==
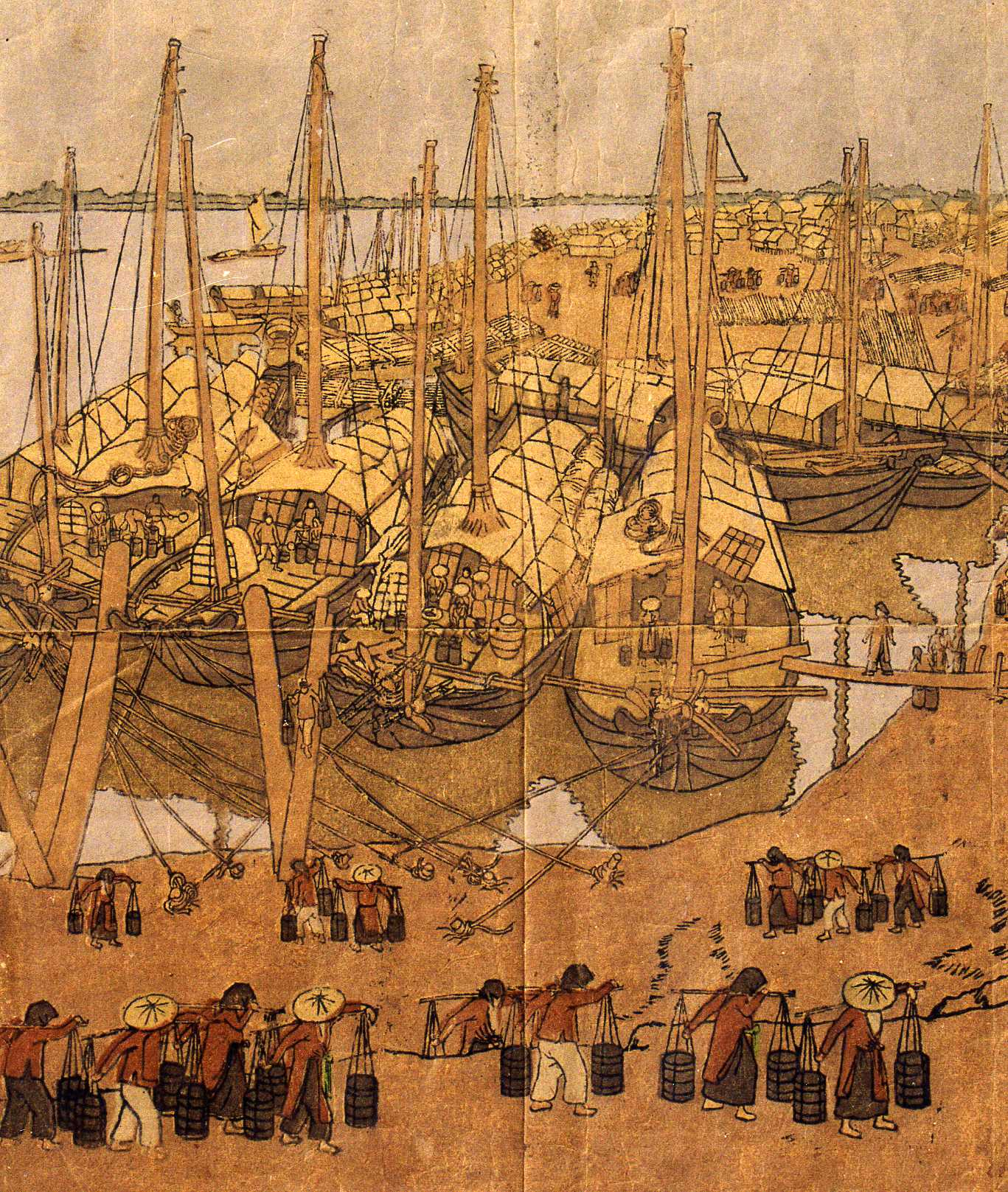
Boats on the Red River Wharf by painter Đỗ Đức Thuận in 1930

In the 19th century, the Red River was thought to be a lucrative trade route to China. The late-19th-century French explorers traveled up the Red River until Manhao, in South Yunnan, and then overland toward Kunming.

The Red River remained the main commercial travel route between the French Indochina and Yunnan until the opening of the Kunming–Haiphong Railway in 1910. Although French steamers could go as far upstream as Lao Cai during the rainy season, steamships could not go upstream of Yên Bái from November to April, when goods were moved by small vessels (junks).

Thanks to the river, Haiphong was in the early 20th century the sea port that was most easily accessible from Kunming. Still, the travel time between Haiphong and Kunming was reckoned by the Western authorities at 28 days. It involved 16 days of travel by steamer and then a small boat up the Red River to Manhao (425 miles), and then 12 days overland (194 miles) to Kunming.

Manhao was considered the head of navigation for the smallest vessels (wupan 五版) and so Yunnan's products such as tin would be brought to Manhao by pack mules, where they would be loaded to boats to be sent downstream. On the Manhao to Lao Cai section, where the current may be quite fast, especially during the freshet season, traveling upstream in an wupan was much more difficult than downstream. According to one report, Manhao to Lao Cai could take just 10 hours, but sailing in the reverse direction could take 10 days and sometimes as much as one month.

== Dams ==
Several hydroelectric dams have been constructed on the Red River in Yunnan:

- Da Wan Dam
- Dachunhe I Dam
- Dachunhe II Dam
- Nansha Dam, near Nansha Town, Yuanyang County
- Madushan Dam, near Manhao Town, Gejiu City

Many more dams exist on the Red River's tributaries in both Yunnan and Vietnam. One of the earliest is the Thác Bà Dam in Vietnam, constructed in 1972, which forms the Thác Bà Lake.

== Settlements ==
=== China ===
- Yunnan (雲南)
  - Honghe (紅河)
  - Nansha Town, the county seat of Yuanyang County, Yunnan (南沙鎮)
  - Manhao Town (Gejiu County-level City) (蔓耗鎮)
  - Hekou Yao Autonomous County (河口瑤族自治縣)

=== Vietnam ===
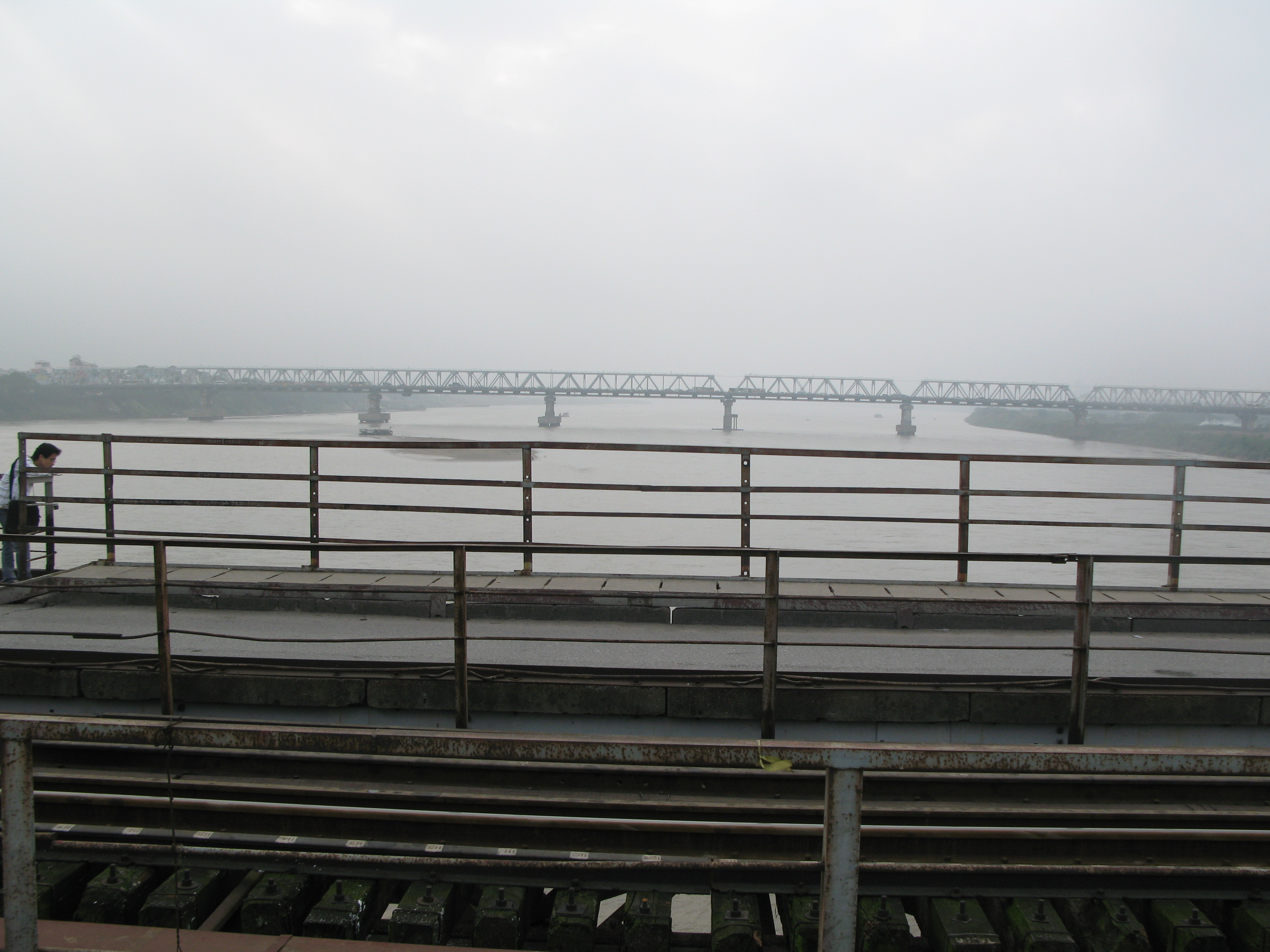
The Red River, view from Long Biên Bridge, Hanoi, Vietnam

- Hà Nội
  - Tây Hồ district
  - Ba Đình district
  - Hoàn Kiếm district
  - Hai Bà Trưng district
  - Long Biên district
  - Gia Lâm district
  - Hoàng Mai district
  - Ba Vì district
  - Đan Phượng district
  - Đông Anh district
  - Mê Linh district
  - Phúc Thọ district
  - Phú Xuyên district
  - Sơn Tây town
  - Thanh Trì district
  - Thường Tín district
  - Từ Liêm district
- Hà Nam province
  - Duy Tiên district
  - Lý Nhân district
- Hưng Yên province
  - Văn Giang district
  - Khoái Châu district
  - Kim Động district
  - Hưng Yên
  - Tiên Lữ district
- Lào Cai province
  - Bảo Yên district
  - Bảo Thắng district
- Nam Định province
  - Nam Trực district
  - Giao Thủy district
  - Trực Ninh district
  - Xuân Trường district
- Phú Thọ province
  - Cẩm Khê district (old name: Sông Thao district)
  - Hạ Hòa
  - Lâm Thao
  - Phú Thọ
  - Tam Nông
  - Thanh Ba
  - Thanh Thủy
  - Việt Trì
- Thái Bình province
  - Hưng Hà district
  - Vũ Thư district
  - Kiến Xương district
  - Tiền Hải district
- Vĩnh Phúc province
  - Vĩnh Tường district
  - Yên Lạc district
- Yên Bái province
  - Trấn Yên district
  - Văn Yên district

== See also ==
- Yuan River and Yuanjiang (disambiguation)
- Red River Delta
- Red River Fault
- Geography of China
- Geography of Vietnam
