= Xuân Thủy National Park =

National park in Vietnam

- IUCN category II (national park)
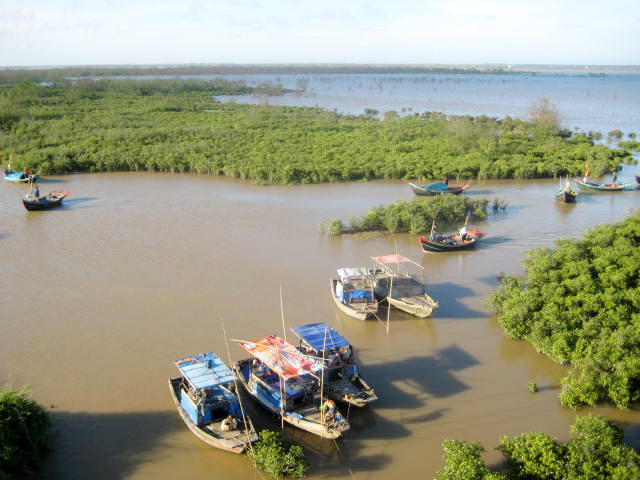
- Mangrove forests of Xuân Thủy National Park

- Location within Vietnam
- Location: Northern Vietnam
- Nearest city: Nam Định, Thái Bình
- Coordinates: 20°13′48″N 106°31′00″E
- Area: 7,100 km^{2} (2,700 sq mi)
- Established: 2003
- Governing body: People's Committee province of Nam Định

Ramsar Wetland
- Official name: Xuan Thuy Natural Wetland Reserve
- Designated: 20 September 1988
- Reference no.: 409

Xuân Thủy National Park (Vietnamese: Vườn quốc gia Xuân Thủy) is a national park in Hong River Biosphere Reserve in Ninh Bình province, Vietnam. The national park was established according to the Decision number 01/2003/QĐ-TTg dated 2 January 2003 signed by premier Nguyễn Tấn Dũng, this decision turned Xuân Thủy Wetland Nature Reserve into Xuân Thủy National Park. The park was the first wetland area to be announced a Ramsar site in south-east Asia and is internationally significant as a migratory bird habitat.

== History ==
On 2 January 1989, the area of 12,000 hectare around the mouth of the Red River in Giao Thủy District located in north-east Vietnam were recognized as Southeast Asia's first Ramsar site, being the 50th site worldwide. Six years later the establishment of Xuân Thủy Wetland Natural Reserve was decided by the government, soon after it was upgraded to be the Xuân Thủy National Park in 2003, putting the National Park under the Department of Agriculture and Rural Development of Nam Định Province. Furthermore, the park was acknowledged by UNESCO as part of the core zone of the Red River Biosphere Reserve. The numerous titles given by both national and international agencies and the strong support from the government and international organizations (governmental and non-governmental) reflect the importance of the area.

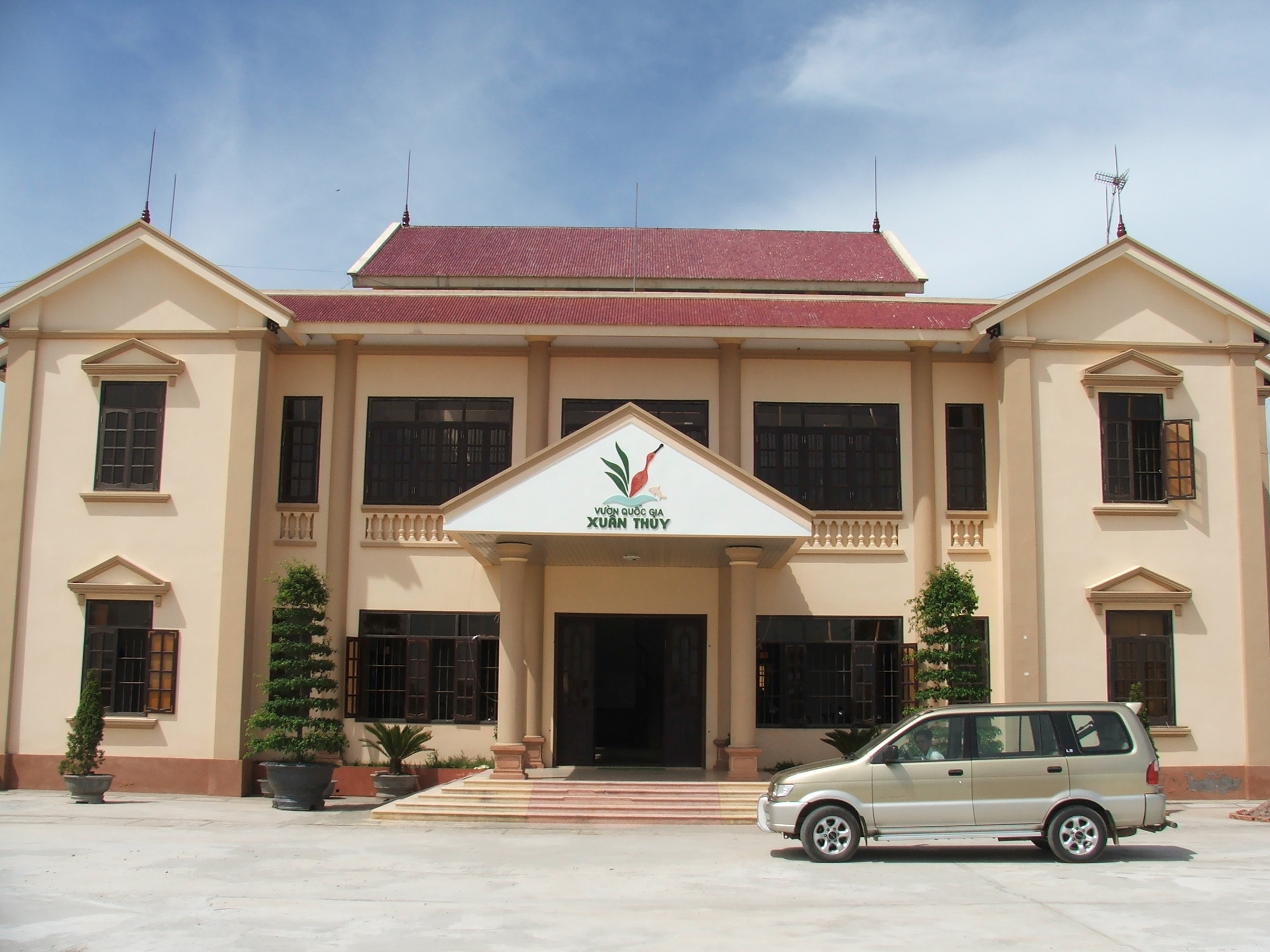
Office Xuân Thủy National Park

== Landscape and climate ==
=== Landscape ===
Xuân Thủy National Park is located in Giao Thủy District (Nam Định Province), 150 km south-east from Hanoi. It is the largest coastal wetland ecosystem in the north of Vietnam and placed in the south of the Red River mouth. The Core Zone has a total area of 7.100 hectares, 4000 hectares of low tide wetlands and 3.100 hectares of land. It covers the islets of Con Ngan, Con Lu and Con Xanh. Aquaculture farms and some parts of mangrove forest cover the largest islet, Con Ngan. Con Lu islet is covered by sandy areas as such as alluvial flats and aquaculture farms. Con Lu, which is the smallest of the three islets is being widened by alluvium from the Red River and covered by sandy layer. The Buffer Zone has a total area of 8.000 hectares. The Park is a delta and estuary islands (Ba Lat river-mouth) support coastal mangroves and the mud flat ecosystem in the Red River delta. The area includes land enclosed by sea dikes with fringing marshes. 'The land is also noted for the human ecological model of VAC (model of planting vegetable gardens, raising fish in ponds and animal husbandry all in one home) and silvofishery models. The area has a long history of wet rice cultivation as well as dike construction and land reclamation'

=== Climate ===
Giao Thuy district lies in the tropical monsoon region, which has two distinct seasons. One hot and rainy season from April to October and a cold and dry season from November to March. The annual average temperature is 24 °C. The highest temperature in summer is 40.3 °C and the coldest temperature in winter is 6.8 °C. The average humidity is 84%. The annual rainfall is between 1700 mm and 1800 mm. Averagely there are 133 rainy days per year. Rain mainly falls in summer or winter. With 15-18 rainy days August is the month with the most rainfall in contrast to autumn and winter with the lowest rainfall (25–50 mm per month). From July to October the Red River is flooded, which influences the region as well as the northeast monsoon. In winter the wind mainly comes from the north and in summer from the east. July and August seem to be the stormiest months in the year where storms are followed by heavy rain. Three strong storms hit the north of Vietnam in 2005 (28 July one wind with level 7, 18 September with level 9 and on 28 September with level 12). There are two types of soil formed from the alluvium of the Red River. One is alluvial mud (which becomes loam) and one is sand. Transported by water the alluvial forms the coastal soil like light soil (sand and light loam and pure sand), medium soil and heavy soil (loam and clay).

== Biological characteristics ==
=== Fauna ===
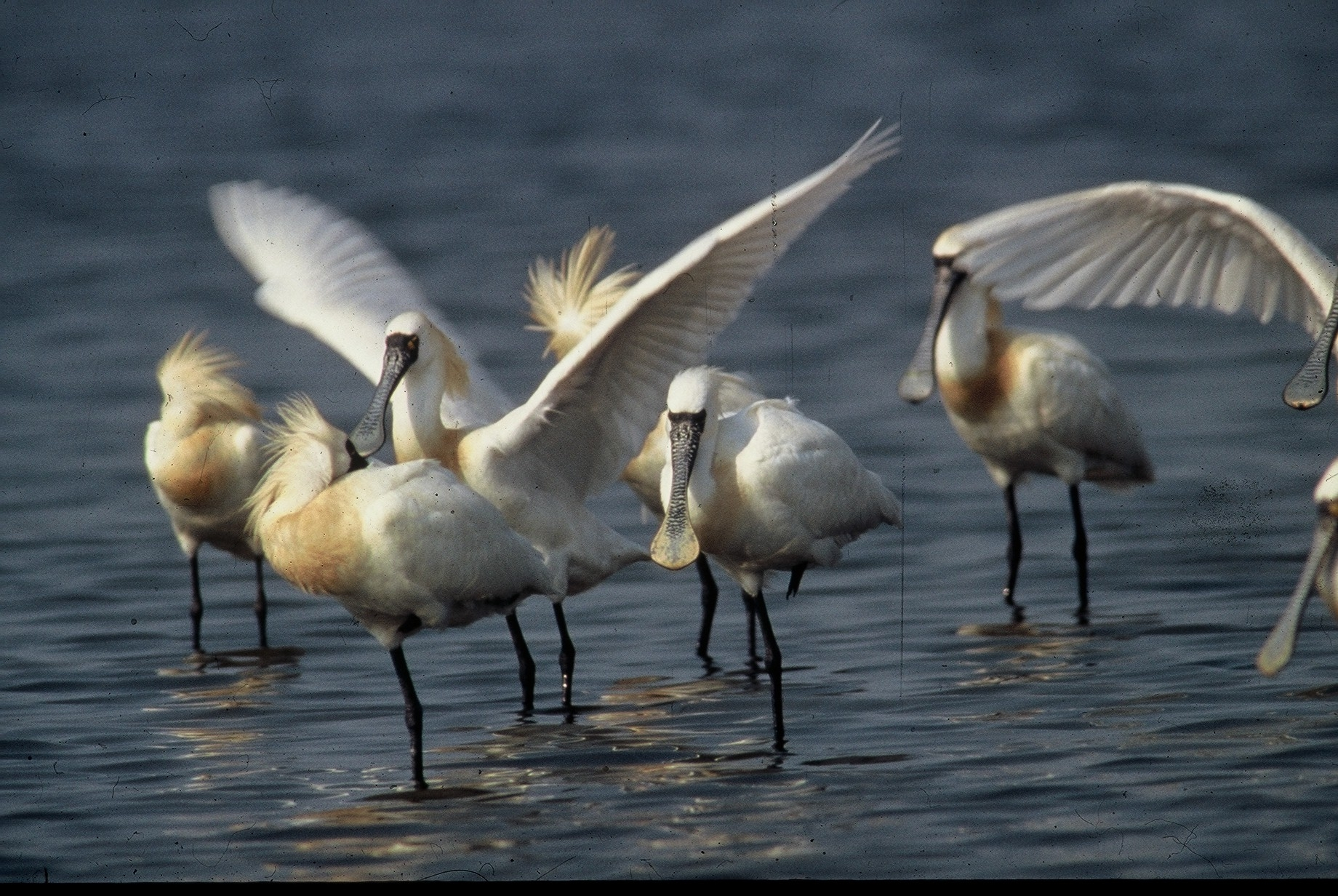
Black-faced spoonbill

Xuân Thủy National Park is a staging and wintering area for shorebirds, gulls and waterfowl in the coastal zone of the Red River Delta. The National Park is a living space for 250 species of birds (150 migratory and 50 water bird species) from 41 families and 13 orders. 9 species are designated as endangered in the IUCN Red List of Threatened Species for example the spoon-billed sandpiper and Nordmann's greenshank. 65- 75 black-faced spoonbill – who were chosen to be the symbol of Xuân Thủy National Park – are seen in the migratory season. The total number of black-faced spoonbill in the world are about 1000, it shows that 5% of the whole population of the species are living in Xuân Thủy National Park during the winter season. The park also provides a habitat for other rare animal species. These include species of otter, endangered cetaceans such as Chinese white dolphins, finless porpoise, and rorqual whales. Furthermore, it has 30 species of reptiles and an uncounted number of different insects.

=== Flora ===
In Xuân Thủy National Park are 120 species of vascular plants (20 of which thrive particularly well in the wetland habitat). The mangrove forest helps stabilizing the alluvial soil as well as functioning as flood protection and playing an important role in different biochemical cycles. 111 aquatic plant species have been recorded. Certain species of seaweed in particular are of high economic value. Over 500 species of benthos and zooplankton (shrimp, fish, crab, oysters etc.) have also been identified.

=== Nature conservation activities ===
In Xuân Thủy National Park's Core Zone there is a portion of unoccupied land used for shrimp-rearing ponds (about 19 extensive farming ponds near the Red River) and extensive clam rearing areas (a part of the sandy plain near the end of Con Ngan). Tents and huts pitched to look after such ponds were built without planning. The land in the Buffer Zone can be divided into several categories including residential land, agricultural farming land, aquaculture land, mangroves and flats and a few mangrove areas along the river canals.

Most of the areas in Bai Trong and Con Ngan, Xuân Thủy's buffer zone, have been divided into ponds to raise shrimps and crabs. This activity grew exponentially in the 1990s. The culturing season is May to January (April to December lunar calendar). During the off season some local people culture yellow thread seaweed for commercial purposes. Hunting of birds and other animals is prohibited and has decreased. Nevertheless, such illegal activities are still present. It is also forbidden for the farmers to graze their buffaloes in the Core Zone.

To prevent the over-exploitation of the given natural resources, there are projects like the Mushroom Club which aim to create alternative livelihoods. Also, the National Park has the task to raise awareness in the communities of the Buffer Zone to care about the environment and to protect it on a long-term basis. To achieve this goal, the National Park started some educational activities which include annual lessons in nine local secondary schools. In the future there will also be a project concerning the solid waste management in the Buffer Zone; at the moment, waste is not separated and simply thrown away.

=== Scientific research ===
Since it is a very important natural site in Southeast Asia, Xuân Thủy National Park has been subject to many both Vietnamese and international scientific researches. According to the National Park, there have been written more than 10 PhD theses, tens of master and hundreds of research papers by students from over 30 Vietnamese universities. Non-governmental organizations also conducted research before implementing new projects which usually are related to the conservation of environment or to sustainable development.

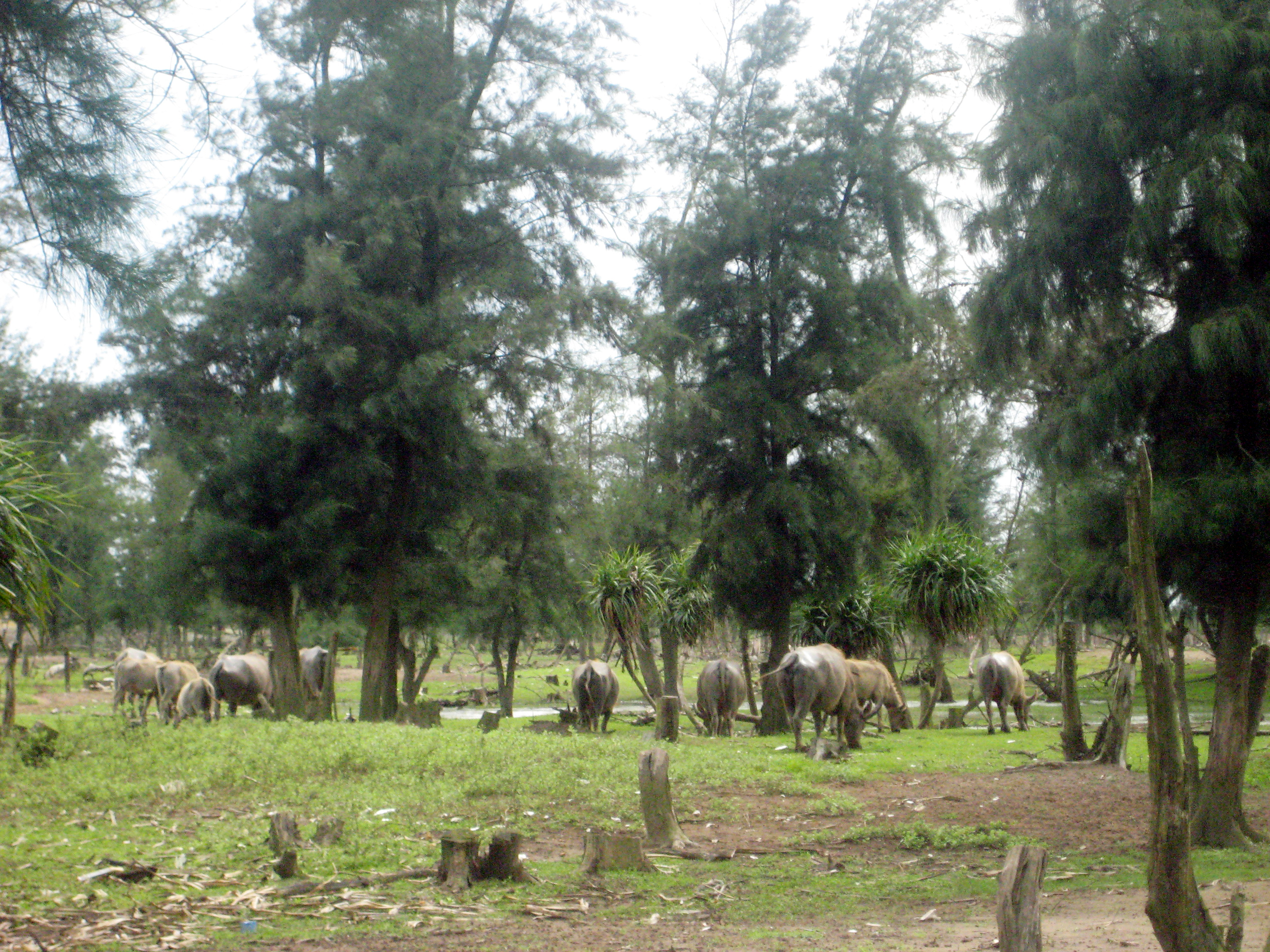
Grazing buffalos in corezone were a big problem since they destroyed the mangrove forest.

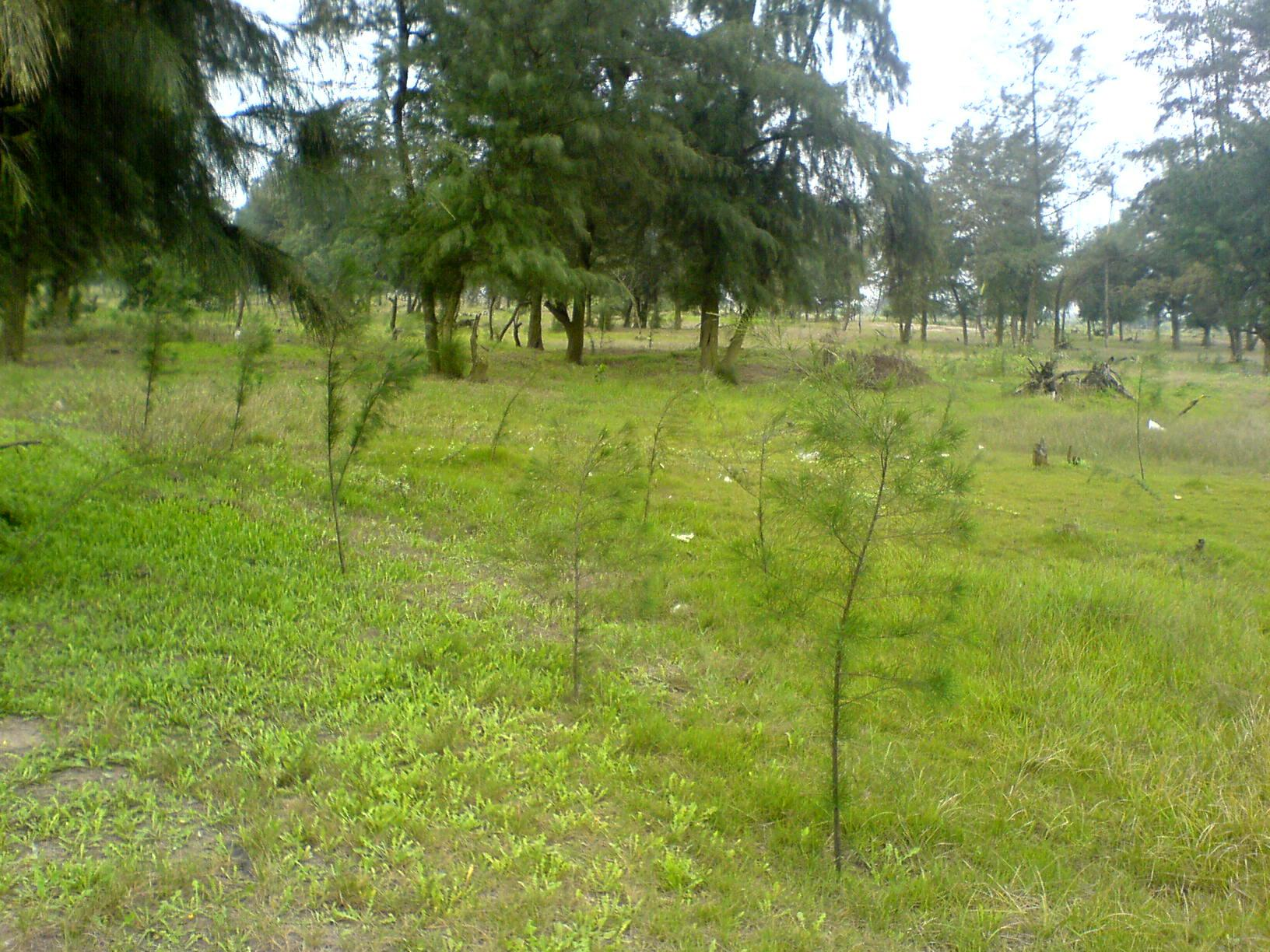
After the banishment of all buffalos the forest is slowly regenerating.

Especially in the Core Zone there are many projects regarding conservation as there is no human activity allowed in this area. The aim is to protect the mangroves, migratory birds, other aquatic and terrestrial species and the wetland ecosystem in its entirety. In the Buffer Zone the focus of scientific research lies on the development of sustainable and environmentally friendly alternative livelihoods and the promotion of environmental protection. Also there is still the need to find mechanisms which end fights between local interests and the park policies. Projects concerning the co-management of clamp culture are a first step to solving those problems. In the whole area there are also projects which focus on building capacity both for the staff of the National Park and for the local community to reduce the current pressure on the natural resources of the park. One problem of any scientific research concerning the park is the missing long-term basis. Most of the projects are conducted by outsiders who sometimes fail to meet the given needs. Furthermore, there is no database in the National Park which collects all research that is ever made so that a lot of basic information needs to be collected repeatedly.

== Socioeconomic background ==
=== Overview ===
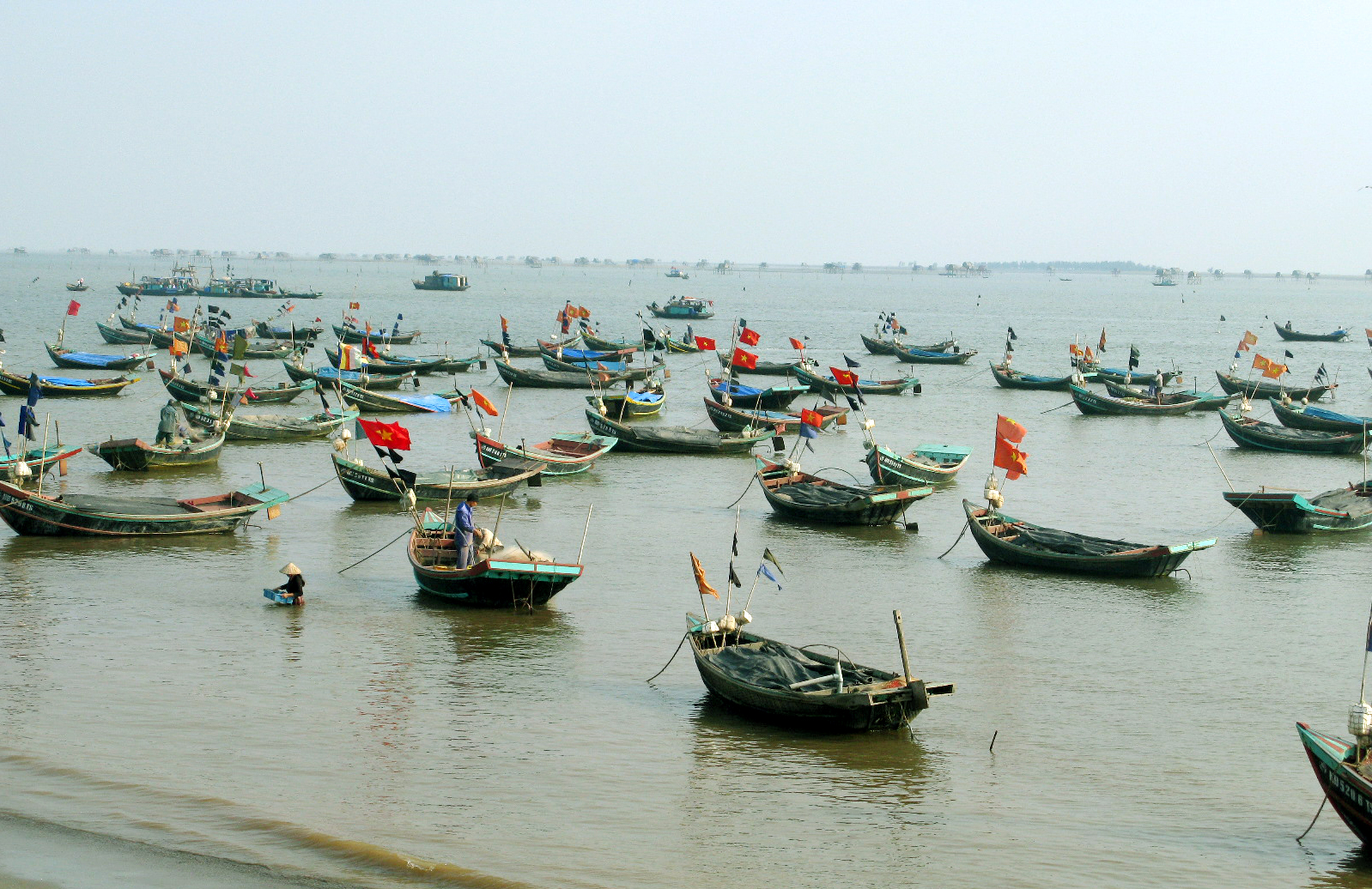
Traditional fishing boats near the mouth of the Red river

According to statistic data of the Giao Thủy District People's Committee from the year 2005, there are 47.123 inhabitants living in the five Buffer Zone Communes (Giao Thien, Giao An, Giao Lac, Giao Xuan and Giao Hai) belonging to the National Park. The average density of population varies between 1,023 and 1,331 people per square kilometer, due to more than one percent population growth every year it is still rising. The local inhabitants earn most of their income by agricultural activities, mainly by cultivating rice. 39.3% of the average income is gained this way, the productivity being 632 kg rice per capita per annum. Because of unfavourable changes in nature, agricultural land is shrinking year by year, creating a lack of land for agricultural production extension. While this economic field has therefore reached its capacities, the second most important one still is seen to have a high potential: In 2007, fisheries came up for 36.1% of a family's income, there were 1,800 hectare of aquaculture ponds in the Buffer Zone. With the annual growth rate of the marine business being 14.9%, this sector is in fast expansion and is seen to have a higher economic turnover than traditional agriculture. On the other side, clam-rearing for example can have a high financial return, but also needs big investments and puts a high pressure on the environment. As the water quality is endangered, it can be seen that some aquacultural ponds stop making any profit after some years and put the owner into a very difficult financial situation.

Husbandry makes up 10% of the annual income, it can improve the daily life of inhabitants and produce organic fertilizer needed for agricultural activities. Since the veterinarian network at its present status is not capable of dealing with major diseases, a further increase in this sector is not possible. New industries and techniques belonging to the sector of services and trade meet a high demand and have a big potential for the future, now making up only 14.6% of the average income. The field of industry and handicraft is underdeveloped and only responsible for 5%; the reasons for this can be found in missing education and a poor material base.

The labour source is structured according to the average income: 78.6% of all inhabitants are working in the sector of agriculture, 16.2% in fisheries, 2% in fields of trading and services and 3.2% in the sector of industry, handicraft and construction. It can be seen that the sector of fisheries is more profitable than traditional agriculture, it is also a more stable employment: people working on the rice fields are unemployed between the two harvests, creating more pressure on the resources of the National Park by exploiting its resources in this time. The general rate of unemployment declined from 8.26% to 6.51% in the period from 2001 to 2005, but since 96.8% of all residents in the Buffer Zone grow their own rice, a high number of workers depends on the agricultural season.

In Xuân Thủy District there are 8510 primary and secondary school students and 1187 high school students. While every child goes to primary school and 95% also visit the secondary school, the number of high school students is still very low. Also, in 2003 only 5% of all inhabitants were trained labourers.

Furthermore, there are still problems caused by the poor infrastructure. All the residents have electricity, but the water supply manly still relies on collected rain water since half of the inhabitants use drilled wells and driven wells, but only 20 to 30% of those have clean water. The low living standard and infrastructure also can be seen as the reason for the unstable and spontaneous production and the missing knowledge and experience of market business, which also causes economic difficulties.

Because there is no possibility of further increasing agriculture and the number of inhabitants is rising, the pressure on the resources of the National Park is growing. Besides the investment in aquaculture, the mangrove forests are a possible resource. Researches by the non-governmental organization Centre for Marinelife Conservation and Community Development (MCD) have shown that more than half of the annual income of an above-average family relies on mangroves while poor families rely more on traditional cultivation and husbandry and only gain one fifth of their annual income by mangroves. To reduce the pressure on the National Park and lower the level of poverty which still lies between 10 and 15%, alternative livelihoods must be created and supported.

=== Alternative livelihoods ===
In order to create alternative income generating sources, to reduce the pressure on the natural resources of the National Park and to generate sustainable employment-possibilities, there are different projects for the Buffer Zone. It is hoped that the human encroachment on the environment can be decreased, this way solving some of the most severe problems like deforestation, the use of small net fishing, by-catch fishing and electric fishing, uncontrollable shrimp pond making and illegal hunting.

The focus of the program to create alternative livelihoods lies on guaranteeing technical and financial support in cooperation with numerous local and international organizations (both governmental and non-governmental), some of the most important ones being MCD, CORiN-ASIA and the Wetlands Alliance Program (WAP). On the financial level the park mainly invests in the local infrastructure building for example roads, a community center of environmental education and public health centers. The goal of gaining awareness on ecological issues and creating a sustainable development mainly is tried to reach by technology support. The transfer of technology to the local population includes the teaching of techniques to grow mushrooms, keep bees and maintain extensive shrimp farms. Because it is seen as an extremely effective service sector, community-based ecotourism is stimulated.

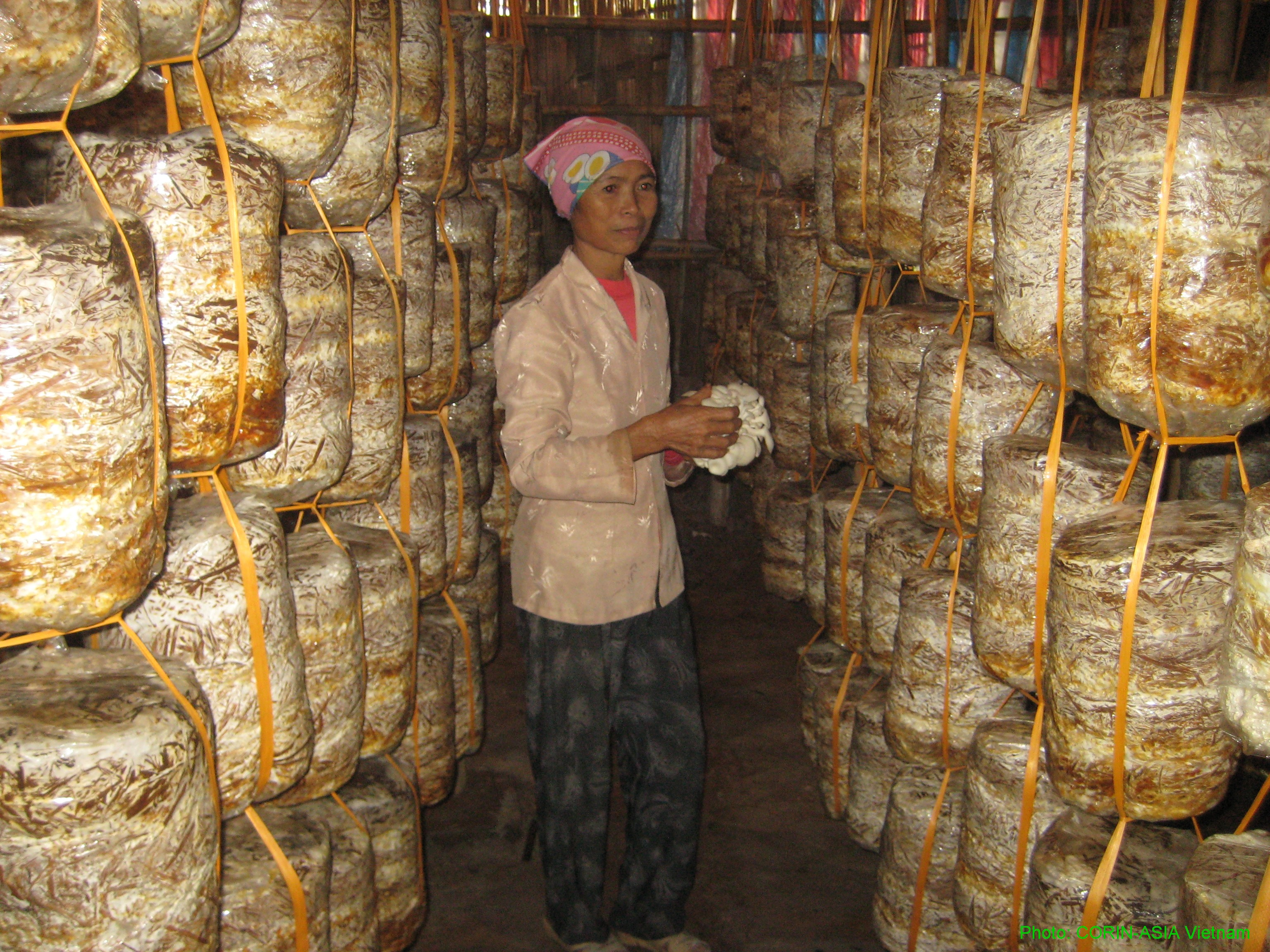
Mushroom Club founded by Xuân Thủy National Park

The project of the Mushroom Club started in 2008. Before, grazing buffaloes in the Core Zone were a major problem as they were destroying the forest. The fight between the Park policies and local interests was tried to solve by creating mushroom culture as an alternative livelihood. With the support of CORiN-ASIA and WAP the Xuân Thủy National Park Mushroom Club was established. This way not only jobs regardless of gender and age were created, the very common open field rice straw burning was also reduced since the straw is now used as humus for the mushrooms. In the future there is the plan to finally use the rice straw as organic fertilizer in agriculture. After one year the Mushroom Club had 78 members who not only worked together but also started to organize small social events like the Mushroom cooking contest for the health of the community.

In November 2010 the project is an important employment possibility between the harvests, now being the Xuân Thủy National Park Mushroom and service cooperation it also has an improved legal status. The grown mushrooms are sold in the surrounding communes and in Hanoi on the Long Biên-market and the South-market. In case of the Honeybee Group the project's aim was to structure previous activities of honey bee keeping. A group was created which now according to the National Park can work more effectively together, thereby increasing the number of bee cages and honey production and gaining a higher income.

The field of ecotourism still sees some difficulties since it is a new model in Vietnam and missing infrastructures are an obstacle for potential visitors. Now the Park has the plan to slowly upgrade facilities, services and marketing until the year 2025. Guest rooms are already available, three new big guest houses will be finished in 2011.

== Management ==
Until the year 2003, the park had a very poor management situation. There were only five staff members with limited technical and professional capacities. The given infrastructure and facilities were insufficient. Since institutional arrangements were unclear, the National Park was not able to implement monitoring activities which could have helped stopping over-exploitation quickly. Besides the overlapping management responsibilities there was a constant fight between local interest groups whose livelihoods depend on the natural resources, and the management board which wanted to decrease the high rate of exploitation. On governmental level there was a lack of coordination and cooperation to implement effective management mechanisms.

Since 2003, the situation has improved. A new office including different function rooms and a natural museum was built and can now meet the given demand for infrastructural and technical capacities. On the level of human resources there were recruited more staff members from different professions such as tourism, forestry, aquaculture and biology. Now there are not only 20 people working in the office, the staff also participates regularly in workshops and training programs to improve their skills in fields of environmental education, ecotourism and community development.

The institutional level is still a challenge. As successful story can the project of co-managing clam culture be seen. Now, the Xuân Thủy National Park management board, local councils and clam farmers cooperate so that clams are harvested under control and responsibilities and rights of each side are clearly defined. The ongoing task of strengthening its institutional capacity is very important for the National Park, for example there is still the need to know about the land use rights in the area to have basic information which then can be used to manage the given resources and activities. Since there are a lot of agencies and organizations which somehow have an influence on or responsibility for the Park, there is the need to organize and structure all the interests to keep a strict Park policy and avoid overlapping responsibilities which prevent the management board from succeeding with its plans.

At the moment, there is a wide range of responsible organizations: local governmental authorities, state agencies, the Xuân Thủy National Park Management Unit as a special agency, internal agencies like the court, the public security and the army, local associations which become more and more important, companies related to credit and banking, religious organizations and, playing a very important role, international organizations including non-governmental organizations. An effective management has to implement all these different players; the present management activities however still lack effectiveness. In the future, the main task for the National Park will be the strengthening of its own institutional status.
