= Giao Thủy district =

Coordinates: 20.250°N 106.417°E

Giao Thủy district Huyện Giao Thủy
- Rural District
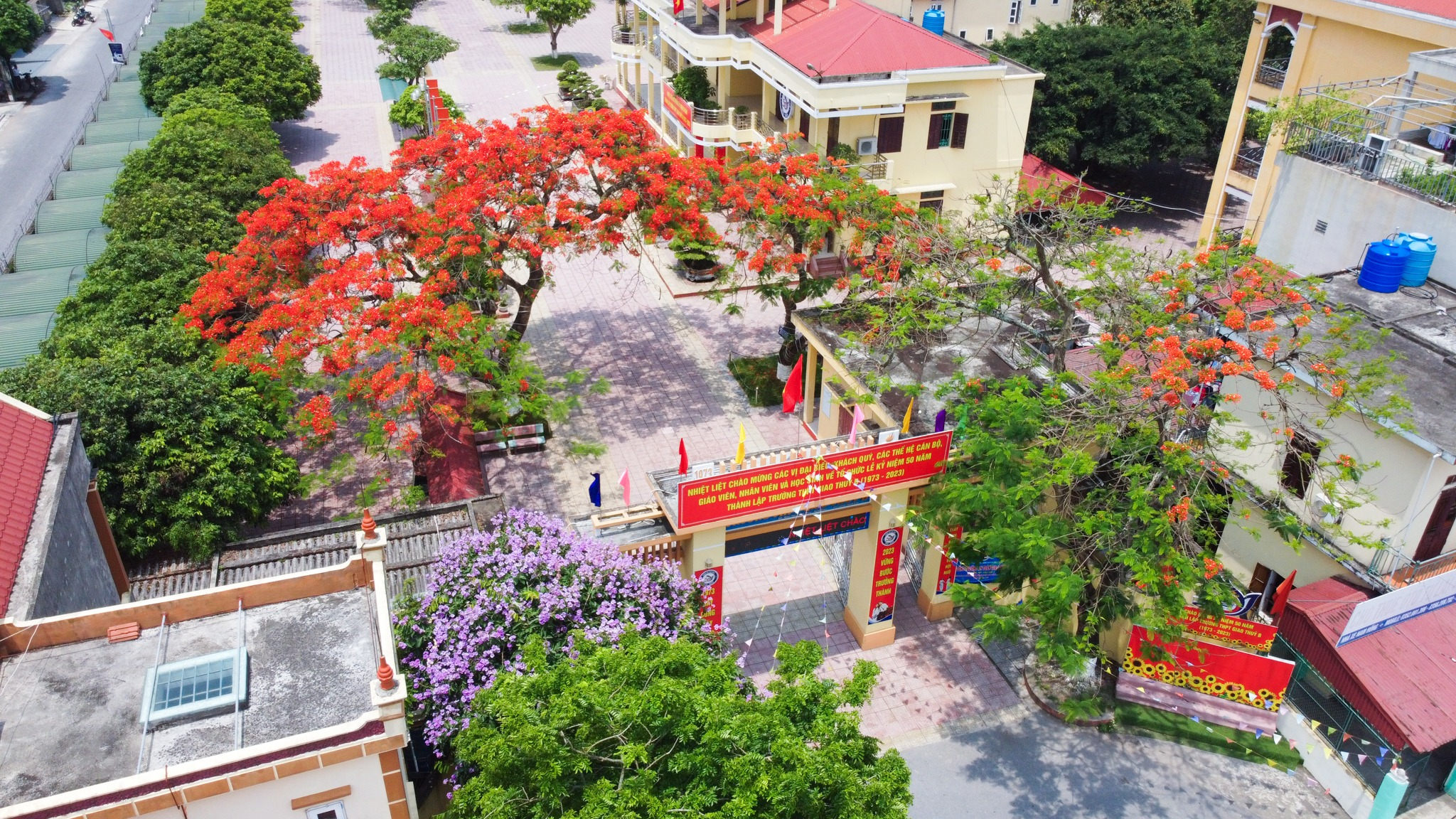
- Gate of the Giao Thủy B High School.

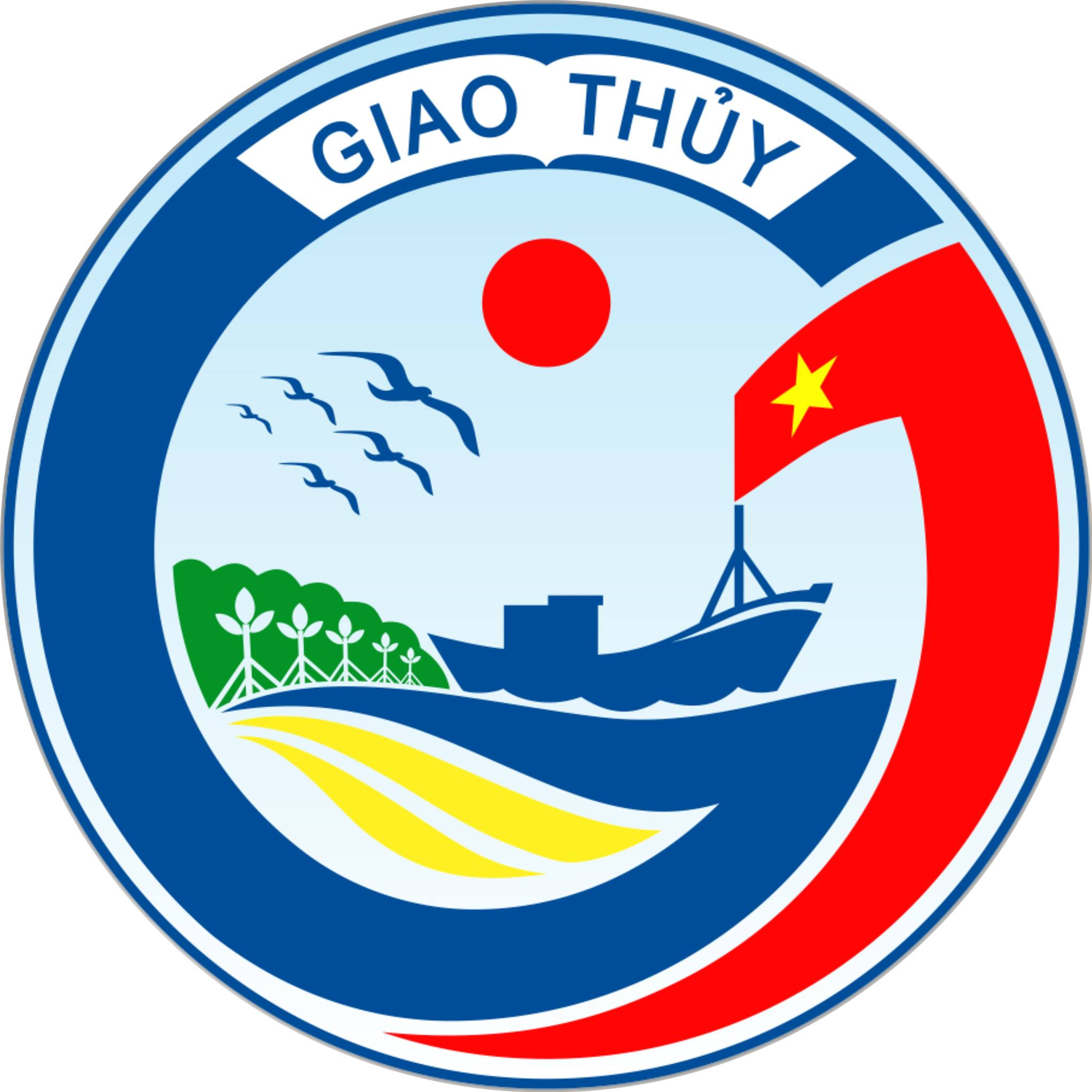
- Seal
- Interactive map of Giao Thủy district
- Location within Vietnam Location within Southeast Asia Location within Asia
- Country: Vietnam
- Region: Red River Delta
- Province: Nam Định
- Existence: 1456 to August 30, 2025
- Central hall: 7CMV+47V, Provincial Route 490, Ngô Đồng township

Government
  - Type: Rural district
  - People Committee's Chairman: Đinh Hoàng Dũng
  - People Council's Chairman: Doãn Quang Hùng
  - Front Committee's Chairman: Vũ Ngọc Côn
  - Party Committee's Secretary: Doãn Quang Hùng

Area
  - Total: 232.1 km^{2} (89.6 sq mi)

Population (2010)
  - Total: 189,660
  - Density: 817.1/km^{2} (2,116/sq mi)
  - Ethnicities: Kinh; Tanka
- Time zone: UTC+7 (Indochina Time)
- ZIP code: 07800
- Website: Giaothuy.Namdinh.gov.vn; Giaothuy.Namdinh.dcs.vn

Giao Thủy [zaːw˧˧:tʰwḭ˧˩˧] is a former rural district of Nam Định province in the Red River Delta region of Vietnam.

== History ==
In the early 1980s, in the context of social changes in economic thinking. Therefore, Giao Thủy is the place to develop and test the short - term industrial crops while ensuring clean environment.

Due to the continuous accretion of the Red River, so far the local governments of the two provinces Nam Định and Thái Bình still disputes a long muddy which were between the two districts Tiền Hải and Giao Thủy. That area is called as "Souvet Bund" (bãi Sú-Vẹt) by the folks.

== Culture ==
The customs of the people of Giao Thủy district in general have more marine properties than the rest of Nam Định province. There are many ideas that this is the first address in the Empire of Annam that has received the Jesuit, which through a pastor or a ship named Ignatius (I-nê-khu from the middle-ages Annamese chronicles).

== Geography ==
As of 2003 the district had a population of 207,273. The district covers an area of 166 km^{2}. The district capital lies at Ngô Đồng and other towns and villages include Giao Xuân, Giao Phong.

== See also ==
- Hải Hậu district
- Tiền Hải district
- Xuân Trường district
