= Gejiu =

Gejiu 个旧市
- County-level city
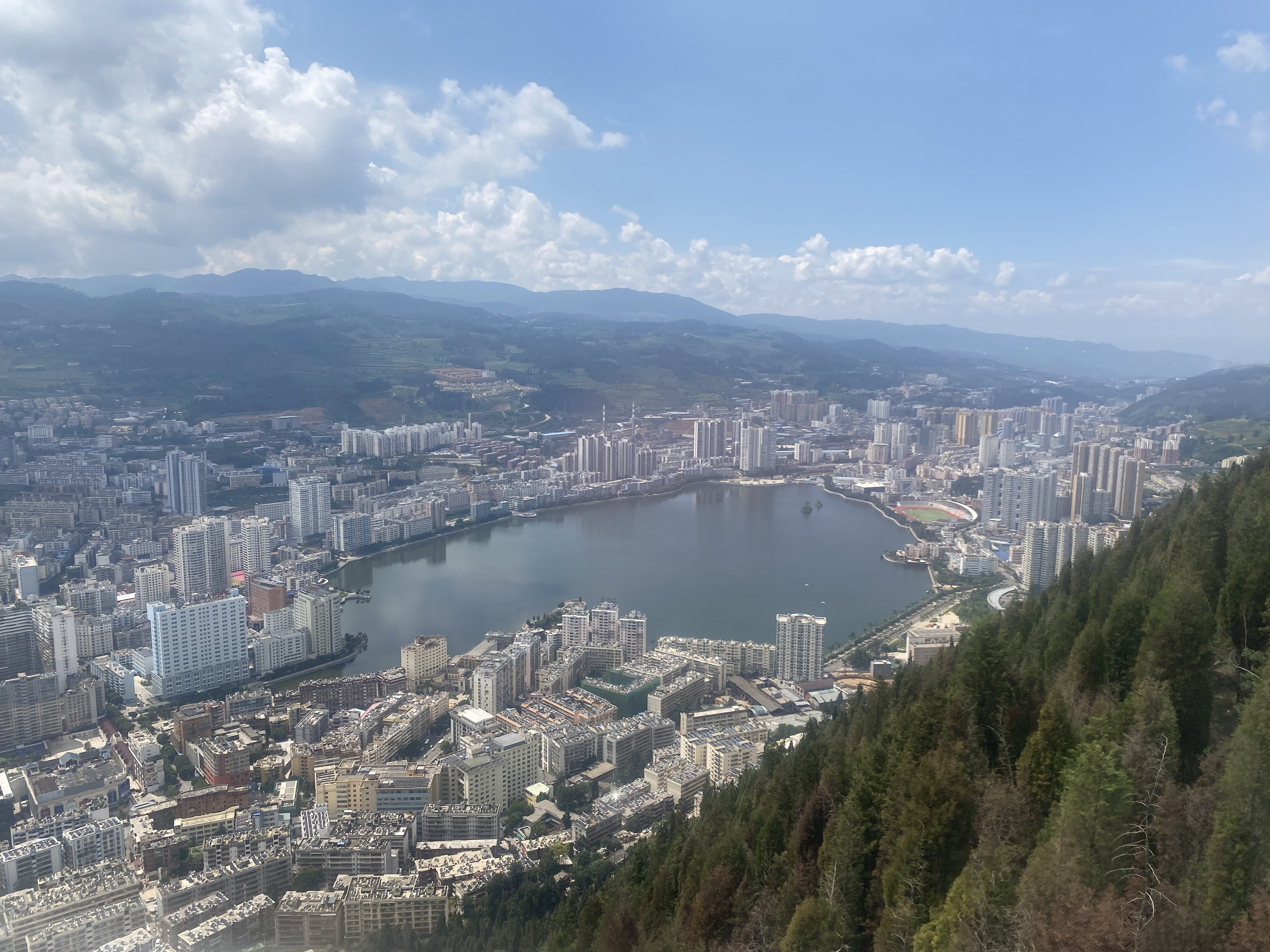
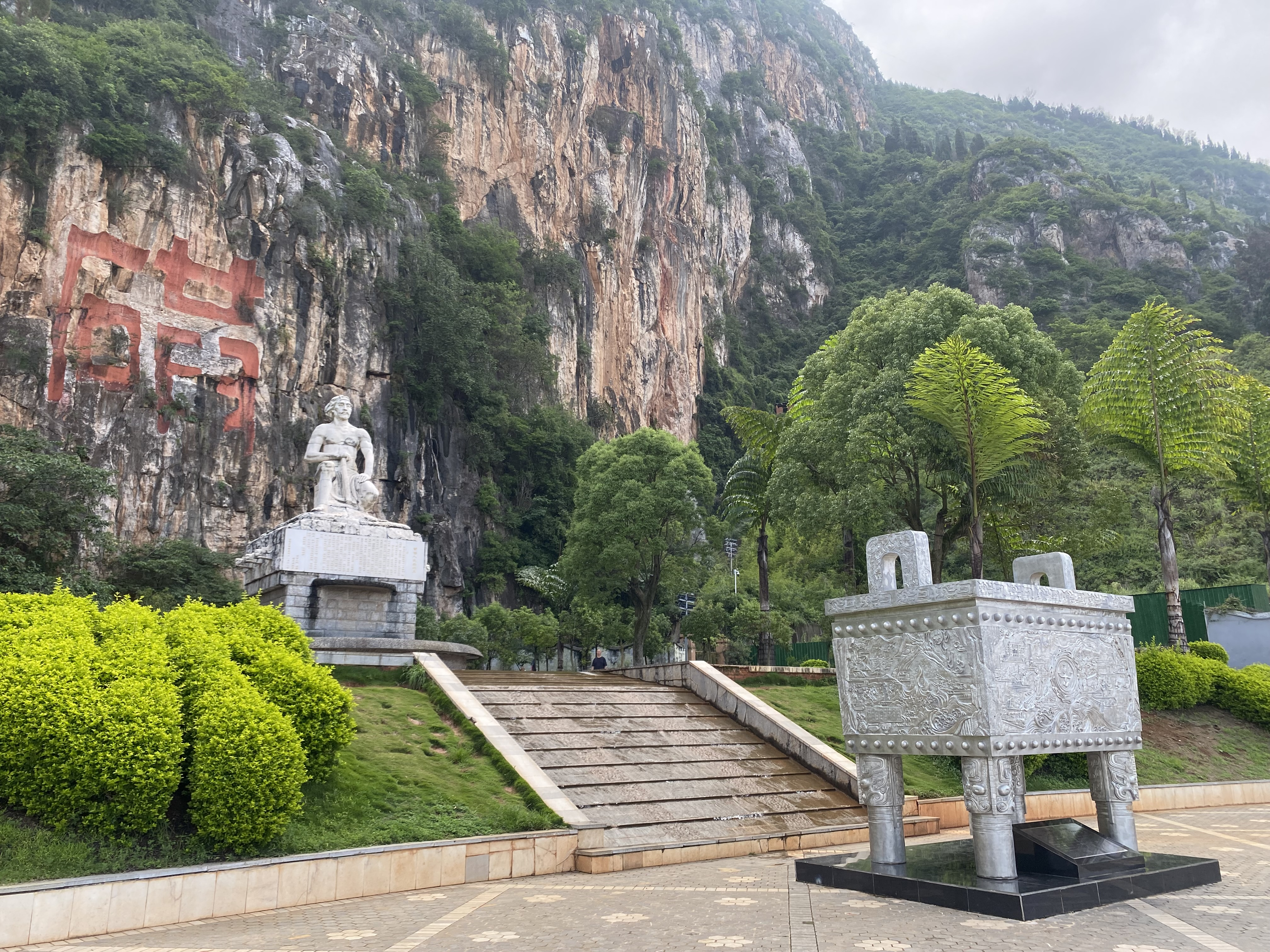
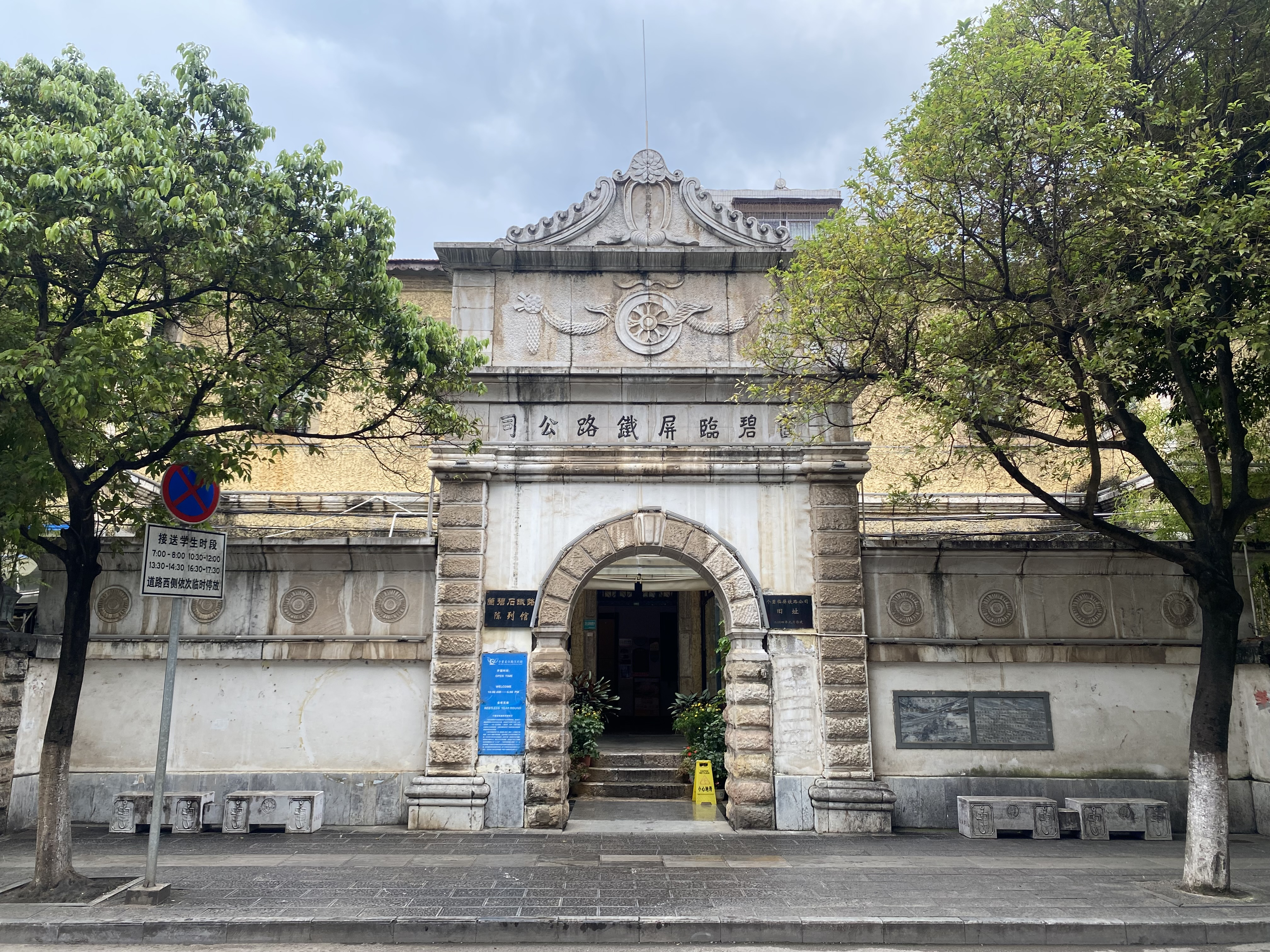
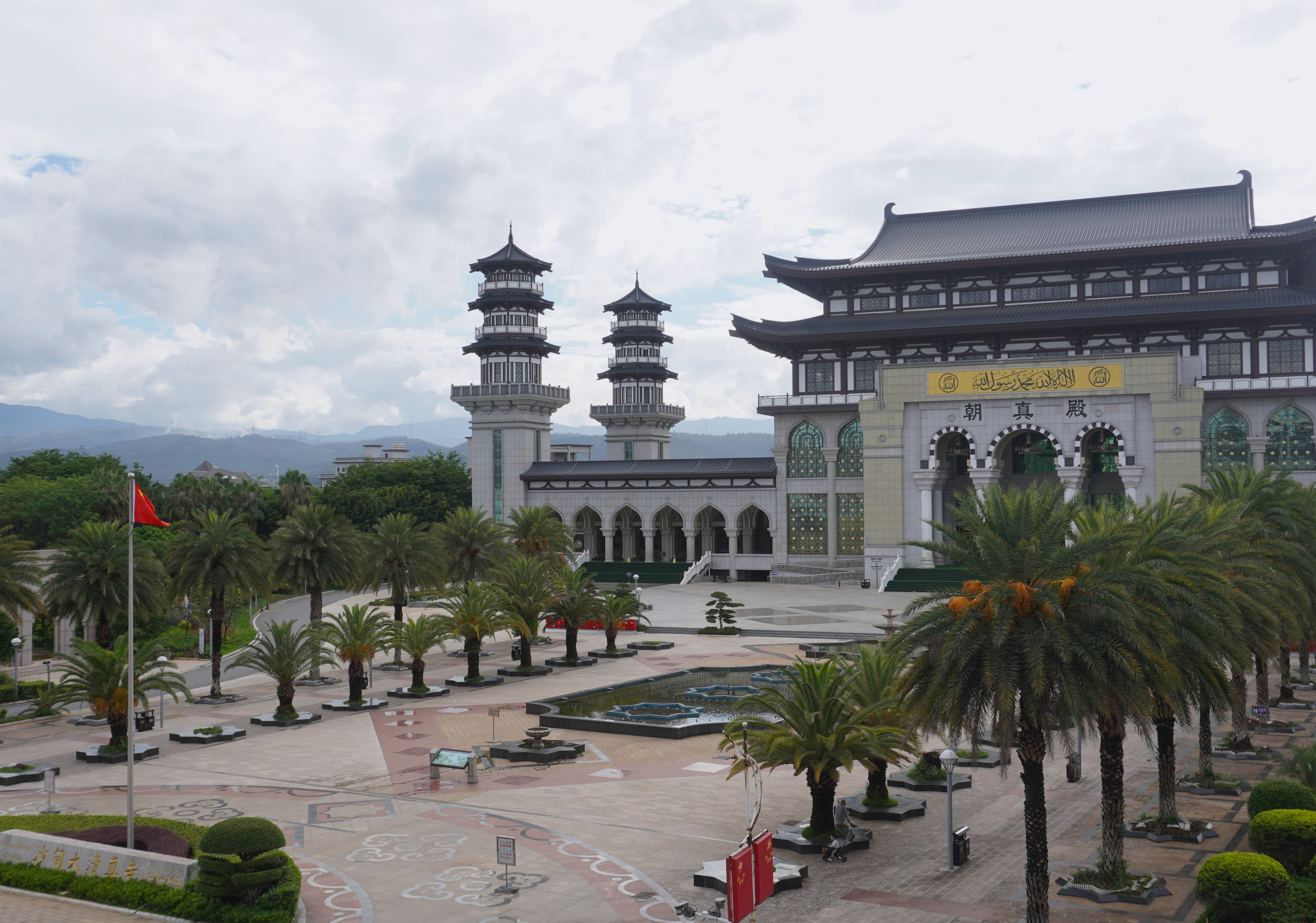
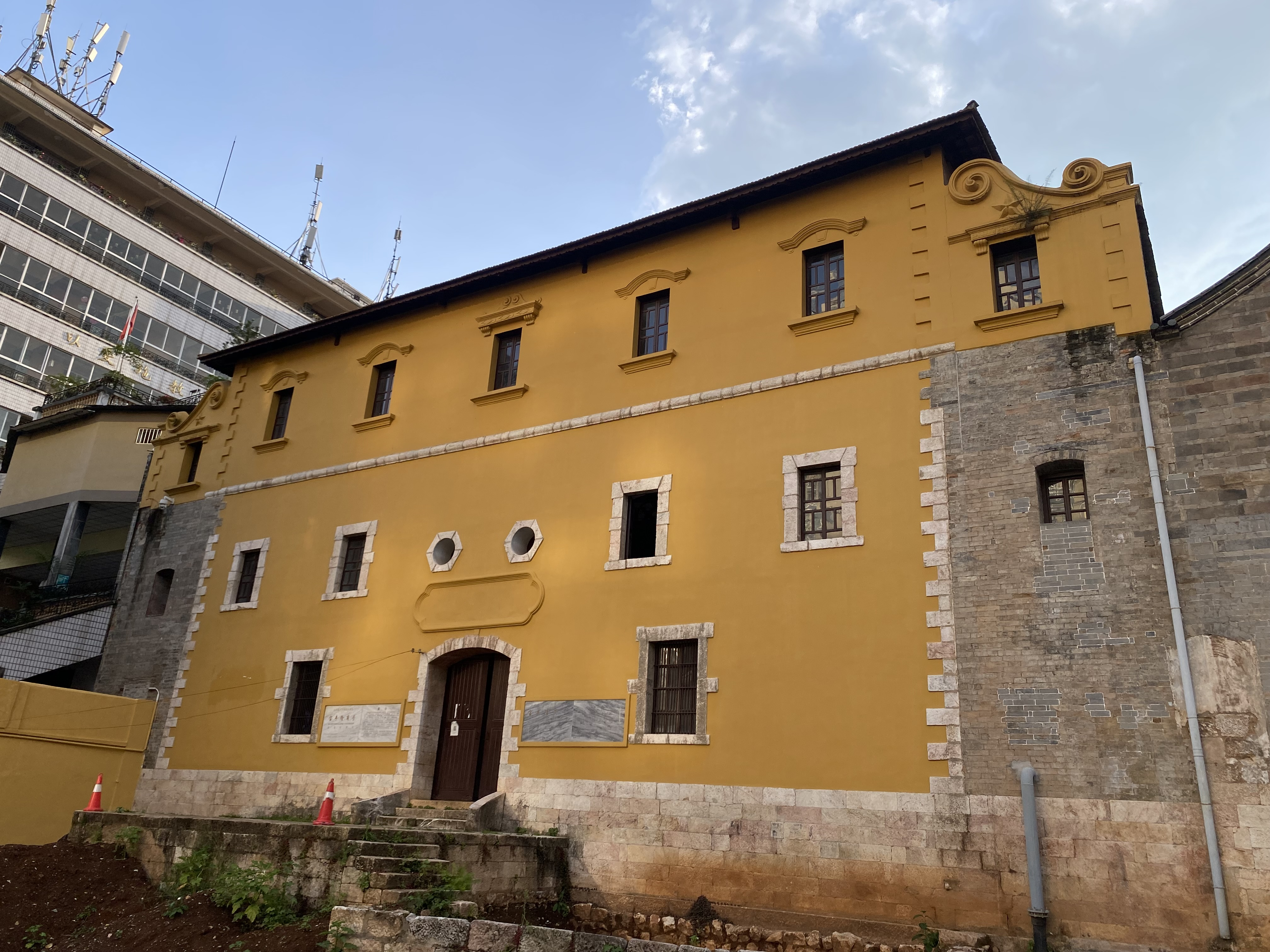
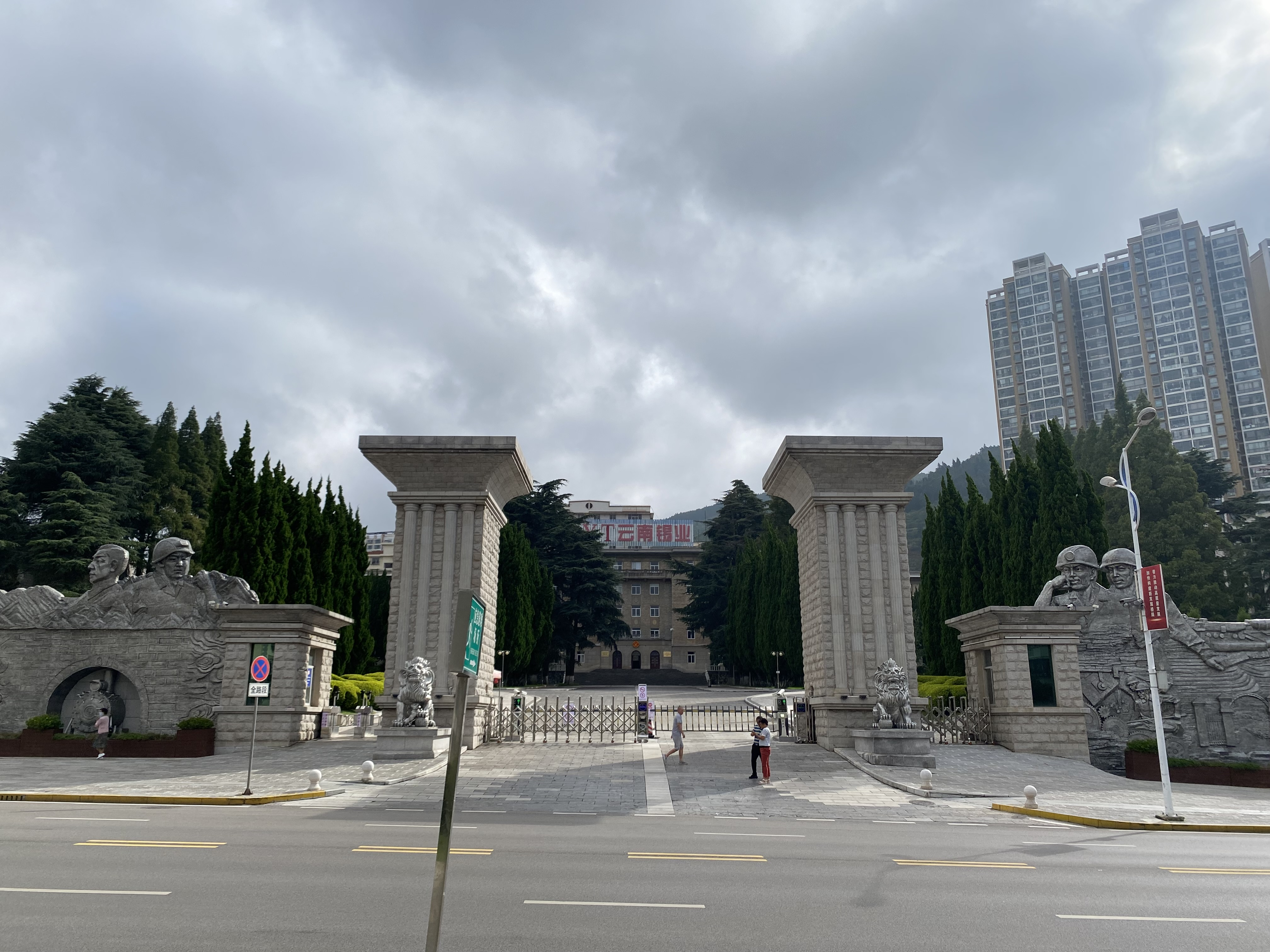
- Downtown skyline Jinhu Cultural Square Former site of GeBi LinPing Railway Company Shadian Grand Mosque Former site of Baofenglong Store Yunnan Tin headquarters

- Location of Gejiu City in Honghe Prefecture within Yunnan province

- Location within China
- Coordinates: 23°22′N 103°09′E
- Country: People's Republic of China
- Province: Yunnan
- Prefecture: Honghe

Area
  - Total: 1,587 km^{2} (613 sq mi)

Population
  - Total: 390,000
  - Density: 250/km^{2} (640/sq mi)
- Postal code: 661000
- Area code: 0873
- Website: www.gjjw.gov.cn

Gejiu
- Traditional Chinese: 箇舊
- Simplified Chinese: 个旧
- Literal meaning: single old
Transcriptions
Standard Mandarin
- Hanyu Pinyin: Gèjiù
- Wade–Giles: Ko^{4}-chiu^{4}
- IPA: [kɤ̂.tɕjôʊ]

Gejiu (Chinese: 个旧; Hani: Goqjef; formerly known as Kochiu) is a county-level city in Honghe Hani and Yi Autonomous Prefecture, Yunnan Province, China, with 202,000 (Note: This is based on the statistic data in 2018, which includes urban population and urban temporary population.) urban inhabitants (ranked 14th largest city in Yunnan). It is the site of China's largest tin deposits and its main industry is mining.

== Location ==
Gejiu is located on the top of a mountain to the north of the Red River (pinyin Hong He) valley, which flows from Xiangyun, Yunnan, to Vietnam. To the southwest in this valley is Nansha, which lies directly below the town of Yuanyang. To the northwest of Gejiu lies Jianshui County, and to the north, Jijie Town, one of its subordinate towns. Mengzi, the capital city of Honghe prefecture, lies 12 miles east of Gejiu.

== Layout ==
The town is located in a crater-like depression around a lake on top of a mountain. The main road enters the town from the north through a thin pass. To the east and west are steep cliffs. Those to the west are too steep to inhabit, however, extensive new construction along the eastern suburbs has created many new residential areas.

== Administrative divisions ==
Administratively, the County-level City of Gejiu consists of 10 township level units:

- 2 subdistricts :Chengqu (城区街道), which includes the urban district, and Datun (大屯街道);
- 6 towns: Xicheng (錫城镇), Shadian (沙甸镇), Jijie (雞街镇), Laochang (老廠镇), Kafang (卡房镇), and Manhao (蔓耗镇);
- 2 townships: Jiasha (贾沙乡) and Baohe (保和乡)

== History ==
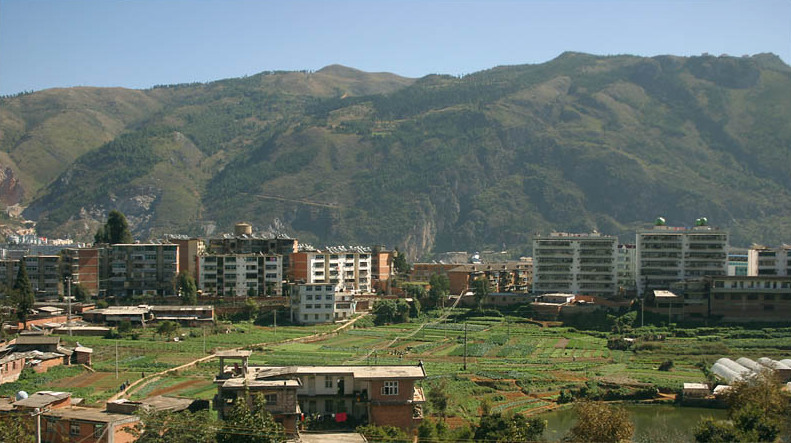
View from the western hills of Gejiu looking east. The city lies in the depression behind the buildings that is not visible. The eastern cliffs, which tower above the city, are visible in the background. (November, 2004)

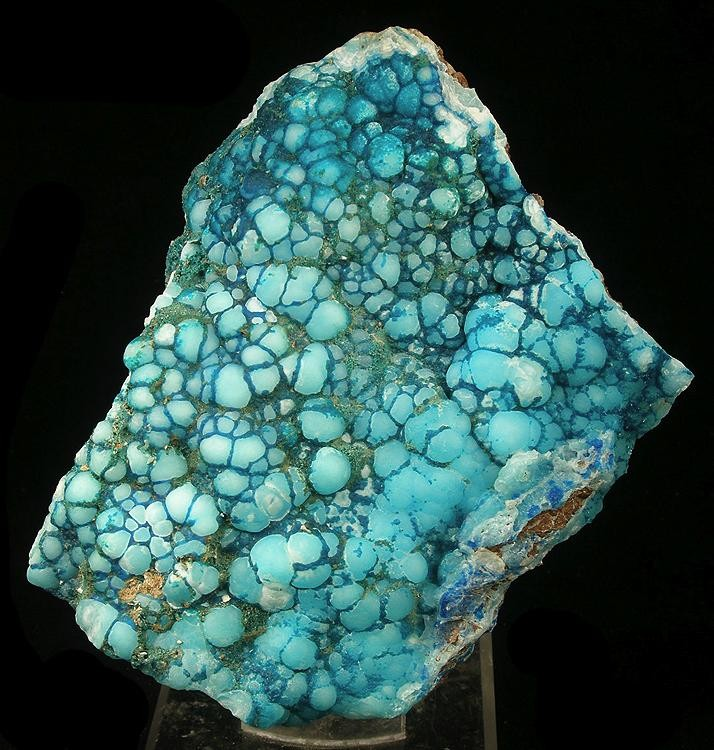
Light-blue botryoidal Hemimorphite outlined by darker-blue Veszelyite, Laochang ore field, Gejiu County.

Originally, Gejiu was called Gejiuli, which is a small mining settlement in Yunnan Province. Under the Yuan (1206–1368) and Ming (1368–1644) dynasties the mining of silver started.

In the late 17th and 18th centuries, mining in Yunnan boomed, but tin mining in Gejiu did not develop until the second half of the 18th century.

In the 1880s, Gejiu was established as a subprefecture (廳) under Mengzi County, which was about 30 km (19 mi) east of the former.

In 1889, Mengzi was opened as a treaty port to serve as a gateway for trade between the Qing Government and what was then French Indochina.

It was not until the French in Vietnam built the Yunnan-Vietnam Railway in 1910 when Gejiu began to develop. One of the main purposes in constructing this railway was to service the mine trading.

During the last years of the Qing dynasty, the mining of tin was organized by the Chinese-owned Gejiu Tin Company, but the company was deficient in capital, technical skill, and managerial efficiency and therefore was replaced by a joint state-private company, Gejiu Tin-Mining Company, under which production boomed.

After the 1911 Revolution, Gejiu was further developed due to its location up in the mountains, surrounded by abundant tin deposits.

A branch line was built from Gejiu to Mengzi between 1915 and 1928 to better serve the transport needs of the tin mine.

By the 1930s, Gejiu tin accounted for 80 percent of the traffic exported on the railway. Tin production is said to have reached 10,000 tons in 1938.

After 1949, the management passed to the state-owned Yunnan Tin-Mining Corporation, which by 1955 had reached and exceeded the pre-war production figures. In addition to the city's tin mine, which remained the chief product, Gejiu had also become a major producer of lead, and a thriving metallurgical industry has been developed. Tin articles made in Gejiu were highly acclaimed in China. Coal for smelting was supplied to the city from nearby Kaiyuan to the north, located on the rail line to Kunming. There is some engineering and chemical production closely allied with Gejiu's metallurgical industries.

Today, Gejiu is a relatively modern county-level city in Yunnan, with a lakeside setting and with a backdrop of rocky hills.

== Landforms ==
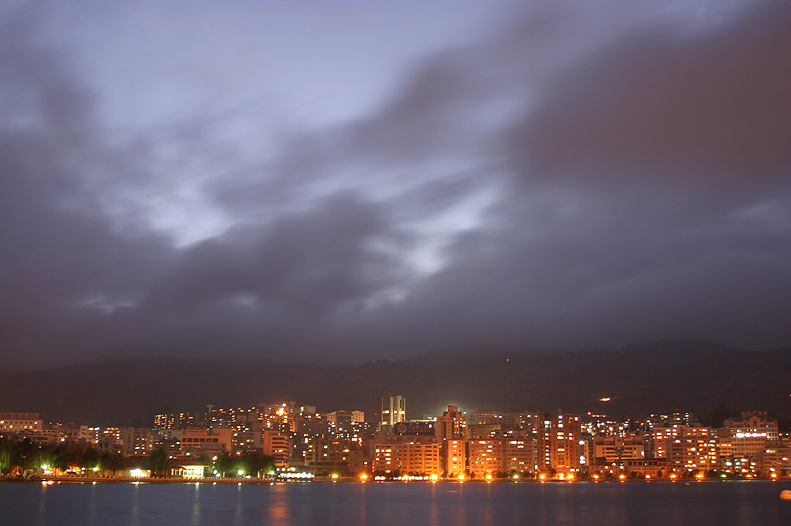
View of Gejiu and its lake at night

The city of Gejiu surrounds a lake which, however, was not naturally formed. A turning point in the city's history was when a mining accident occurred sometime in the 1950s, when water welled up through the mines which led to groundwater rising to the surface, and this flooded a large part of the narrow valley that the city was located in. This accident may well have turned out to be a blessing in disguise for Gejiu, as it provided a nice scenic lake right in the city center. An already cramped upland location became even more cramped after this flood, which has resulted in an extremely dense, high-rise center compared to other small Chinese cities that are built on plains. Later, the adjacent area to the flood-caused lake was turned into a park. Today, the town is protected from further flooding by an underground spillway.

== Climate ==
It is a typical subtropical highland climate (Köppen: Cfb), with a low temperature variation but cold for latitude.

Climate data for Gejiu, elevation 1,721 m (5,646 ft), (1991–2020 normals, extremes 1981–present)
Month	Jan	Feb	Mar	Apr	May	Jun	Jul	Aug	Sep	Oct	Nov	Dec	Year
Record high °C (°F)	21.7 (71.1)	24.9 (76.8)	26.9 (80.4)	28.9 (84.0)	30.1 (86.2)	29.3 (84.7)	29.8 (85.6)	29.8 (85.6)	28.8 (83.8)	26.3 (79.3)	25.1 (77.2)	23.0 (73.4)	30.1 (86.2)
Mean daily maximum °C (°F)	14.7 (58.5)	17.0 (62.6)	20.3 (68.5)	22.9 (73.2)	23.7 (74.7)	24.0 (75.2)	23.9 (75.0)	24.2 (75.6)	23.1 (73.6)	20.6 (69.1)	18.0 (64.4)	14.9 (58.8)	20.6 (69.1)
Daily mean °C (°F)	10.9 (51.6)	12.8 (55.0)	16.0 (60.8)	18.5 (65.3)	19.7 (67.5)	20.7 (69.3)	20.6 (69.1)	20.4 (68.7)	19.1 (66.4)	16.8 (62.2)	13.8 (56.8)	11.0 (51.8)	16.7 (62.0)
Mean daily minimum °C (°F)	8.1 (46.6)	9.8 (49.6)	12.7 (54.9)	15.2 (59.4)	16.9 (62.4)	18.5 (65.3)	18.4 (65.1)	17.9 (64.2)	16.6 (61.9)	14.4 (57.9)	11.1 (52.0)	8.2 (46.8)	14.0 (57.2)
Record low °C (°F)	−1.8 (28.8)	−0.2 (31.6)	−3.0 (26.6)	4.5 (40.1)	8.2 (46.8)	11.8 (53.2)	12.7 (54.9)	12.9 (55.2)	7.7 (45.9)	5.0 (41.0)	0.3 (32.5)	−4.0 (24.8)	−4.0 (24.8)
Average precipitation mm (inches)	35.8 (1.41)	24.0 (0.94)	35.1 (1.38)	61.1 (2.41)	112.8 (4.44)	150.9 (5.94)	215.7 (8.49)	188.3 (7.41)	104.1 (4.10)	61.2 (2.41)	43.7 (1.72)	27.1 (1.07)	1,059.8 (41.72)
Average precipitation days (≥ 0.1 mm)	6.1	5.5	6.2	10.1	15.0	19.2	22.6	20.7	15.3	11.3	6.6	5.3	143.9
Average snowy days	0.6	0.1	0.1	0	0	0	0	0	0	0	0	0.1	0.9
Average relative humidity (%)	73	68	65	67	74	79	81	80	79	80	77	76	75
Mean monthly sunshine hours	193.4	202.1	225.1	233.3	211.2	135.5	116.2	129.7	131.1	131.2	173.7	175.0	2,057.5
Percentage possible sunshine	57	63	60	61	51	33	28	33	36	37	53	53	47
Source: China Meteorological Administrationall-time November record high

== Ethnography ==
The populace is primarily Han Chinese. However, minorities such as the Muslim Hui, Dai from the nearby Red River valley, and Hani from the surrounding mountains (see Yuanyang) are also present.

== Economy ==
In addition to tin reserves, iron and coal are also found in Gejiu.

== Welfare ==
The city is the home of the Gejiu Children's Welfare Institute, an orphanage for Yunnan children.

== See also ==
- HIV/AIDS in Yunnan
