= Giao Thủy =

- Commune
- Interactive map of Giao Thủy
- Coordinates: 20.28252°N 106.42352°E
- Country: Vietnam
- Region: Red River Delta
- Province: Ninh Bình
- Established: 1 September 2024
- Administrative headquarters: Hoành Đông Hamlet

Area
  - Total: 23.52 km^{2} (9.08 sq mi)

Population (2025)
  - Total: 46,557
  - Density: 1,980/km^{2} (5,100/sq mi)
- Postal code: 07806
- Website: giaothuy.ninhbinh.gov.vn

Giao Thủy is a commune in Ninh Bình province, Vietnam. It is one of 129 new communes and wards in Ninh Bình province established as part of the 2025 Vietnamese administrative reforms. The commune inherited its name from Giao Thủy township and the former Giao Thủy district, Nam Định province.

Giao Thủy township was established on 1 September 2024.

On 12 June 2025, the National Assembly of Vietnam adopted Resolution No. 202/2025/QH15 on the reorganization of provincial-level administrative units (effective from[12 June 2025). Under the resolution, Hà Nam province and Nam Định province were merged into Ninh Bình province.

On 16 June 2025:

- The National Assembly of Vietnam adopted Resolution No. 203/2025/QH15 amending and supplementing several articles of the Constitution of Vietnam (effective from 16 June 2025). Under the resolution, district-level administrative units nationwide ceased to operate from 1 July 2025.
- The Standing Committee of the National Assembly of Vietnam issued Resolution No. 1674/NQ-UBTVQH15 on the arrangement of commune-level administrative units in Ninh Bình province in 2025 (effective from 16 June 2025). Under the resolution, the entire area and population of Giao Thủy township and Bình Hòa commune, formerly part of Giao Thủy district, were merged to form a new commune named Giao Thủy.
