= Quảng Bình province =

Province of Vietnam

Quảng Bình
- Province
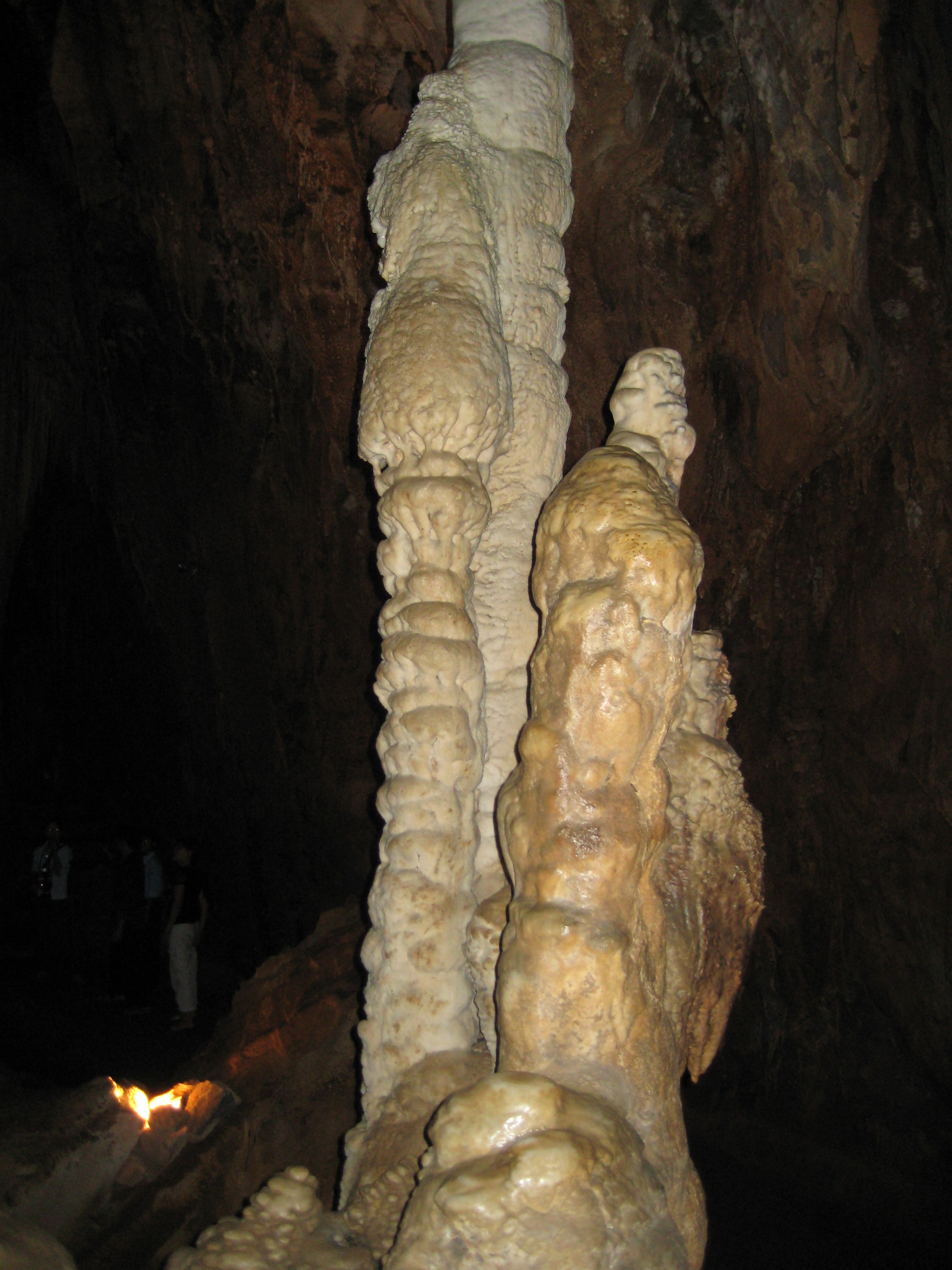
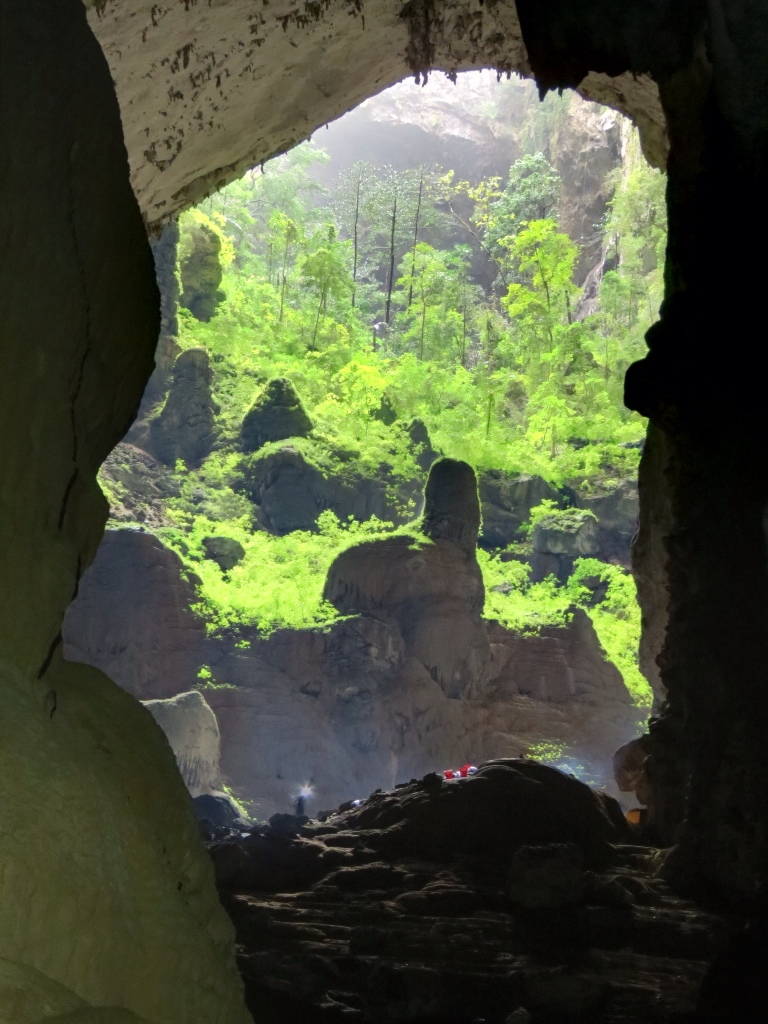
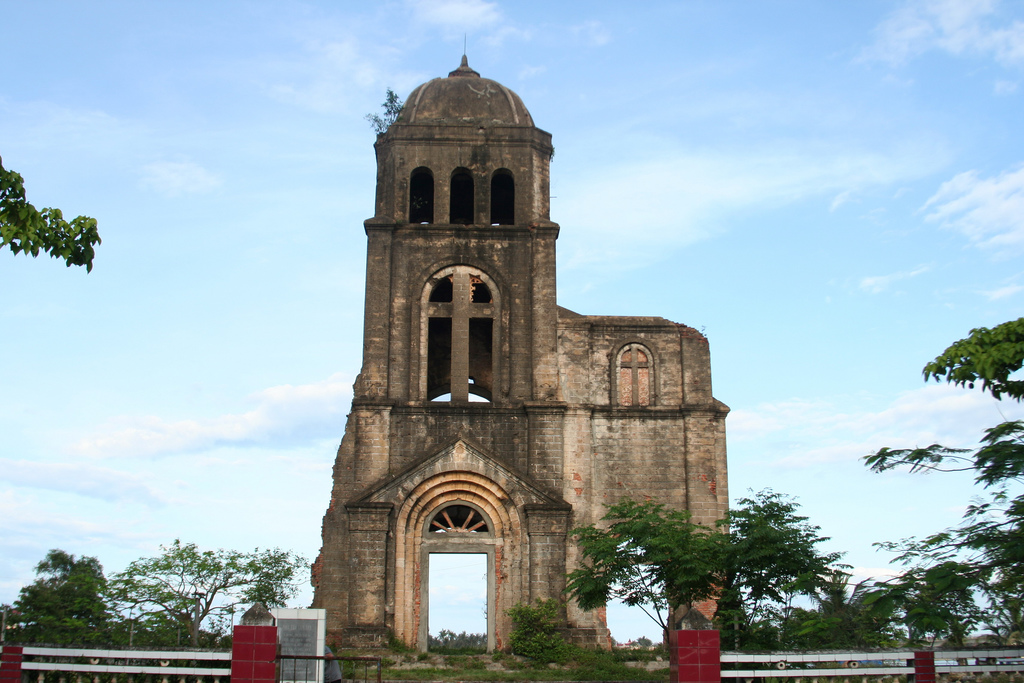
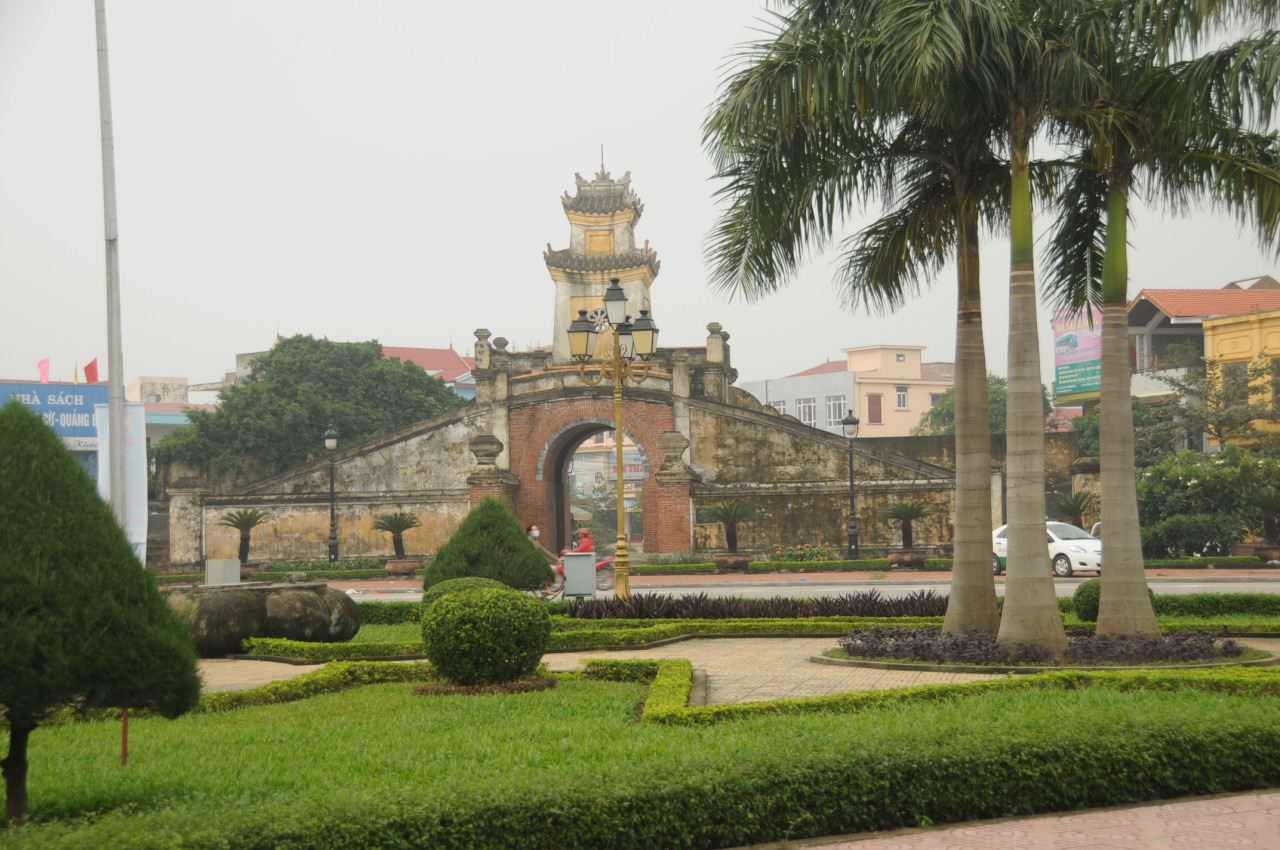
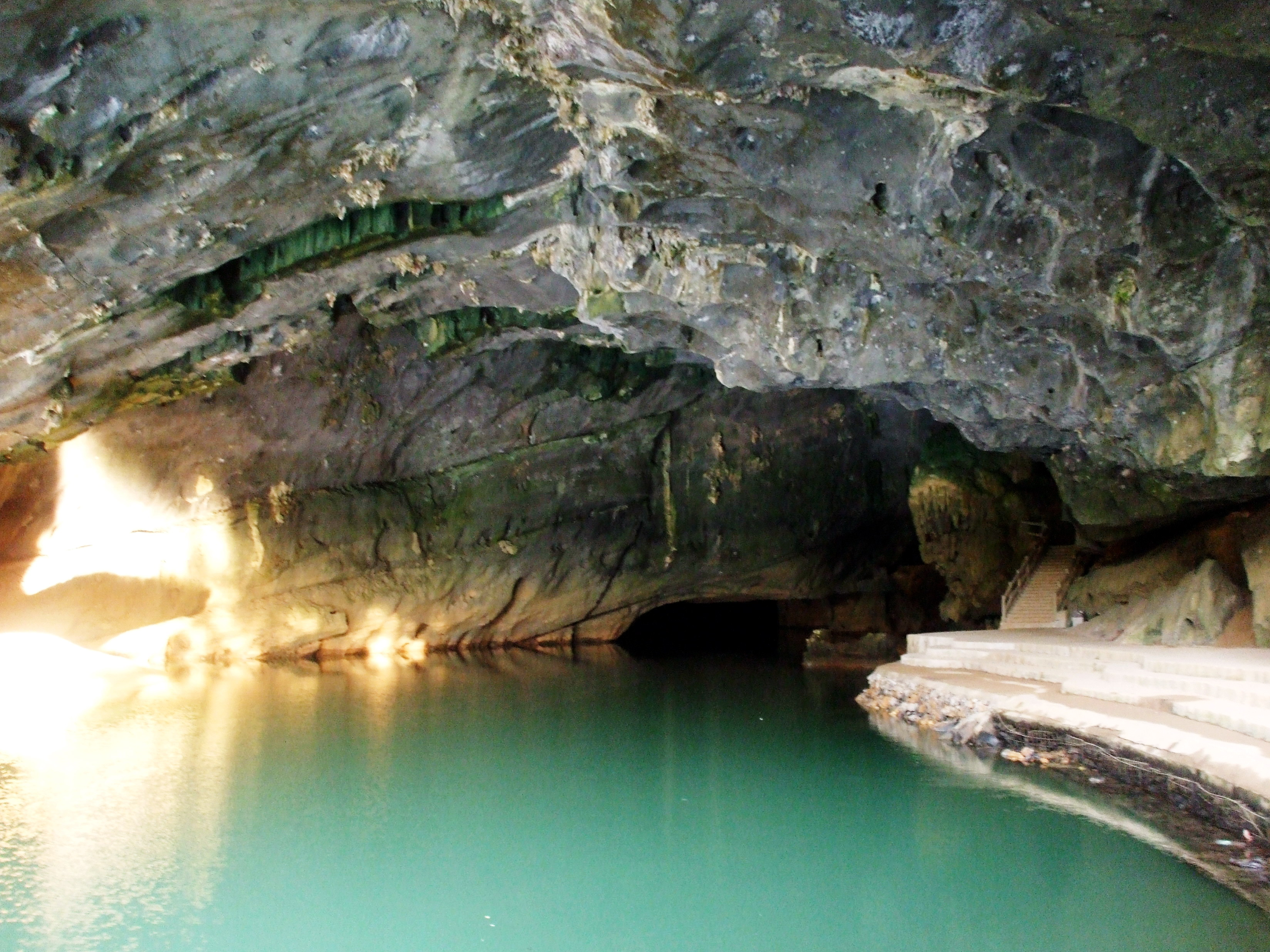
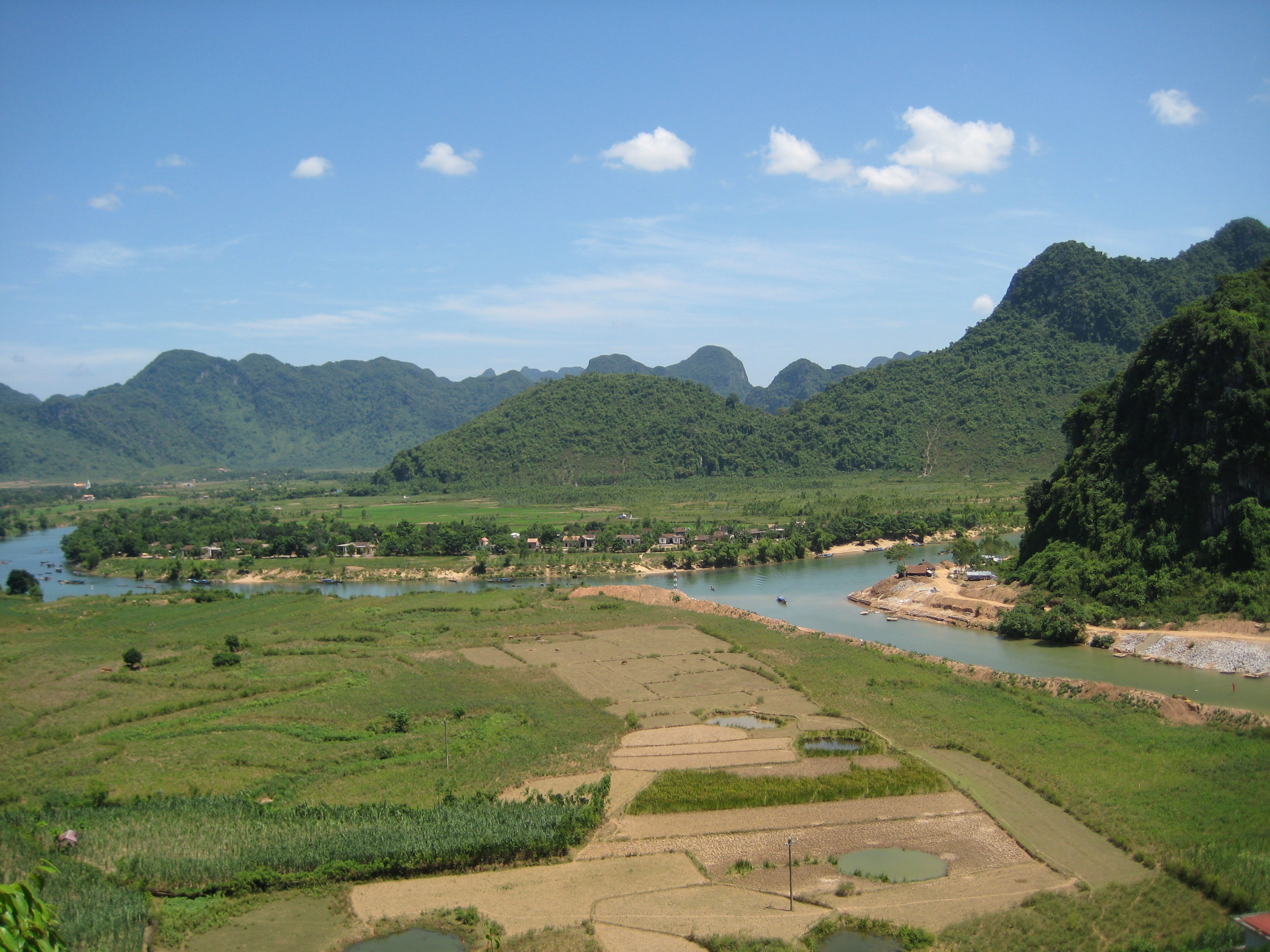
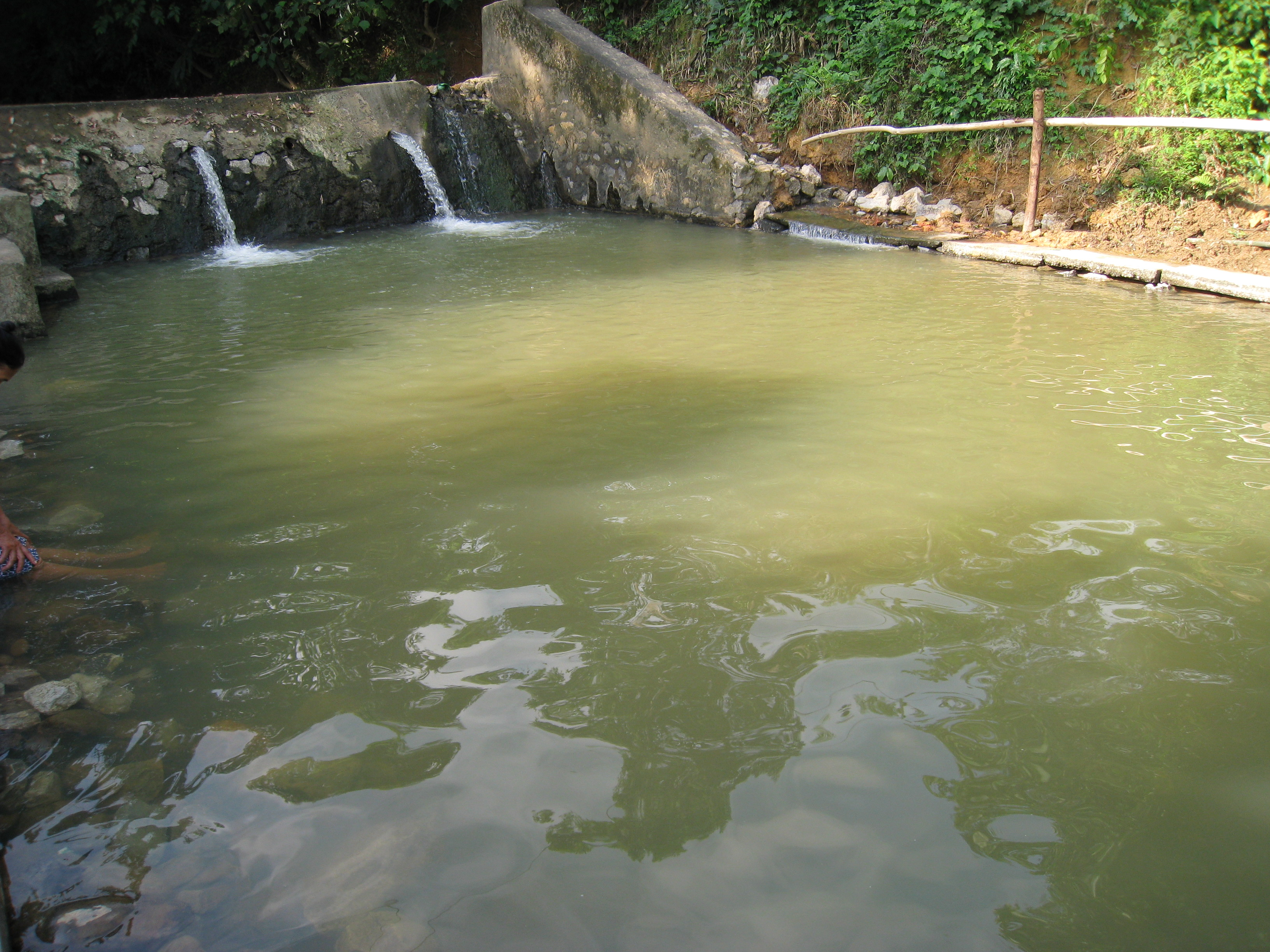
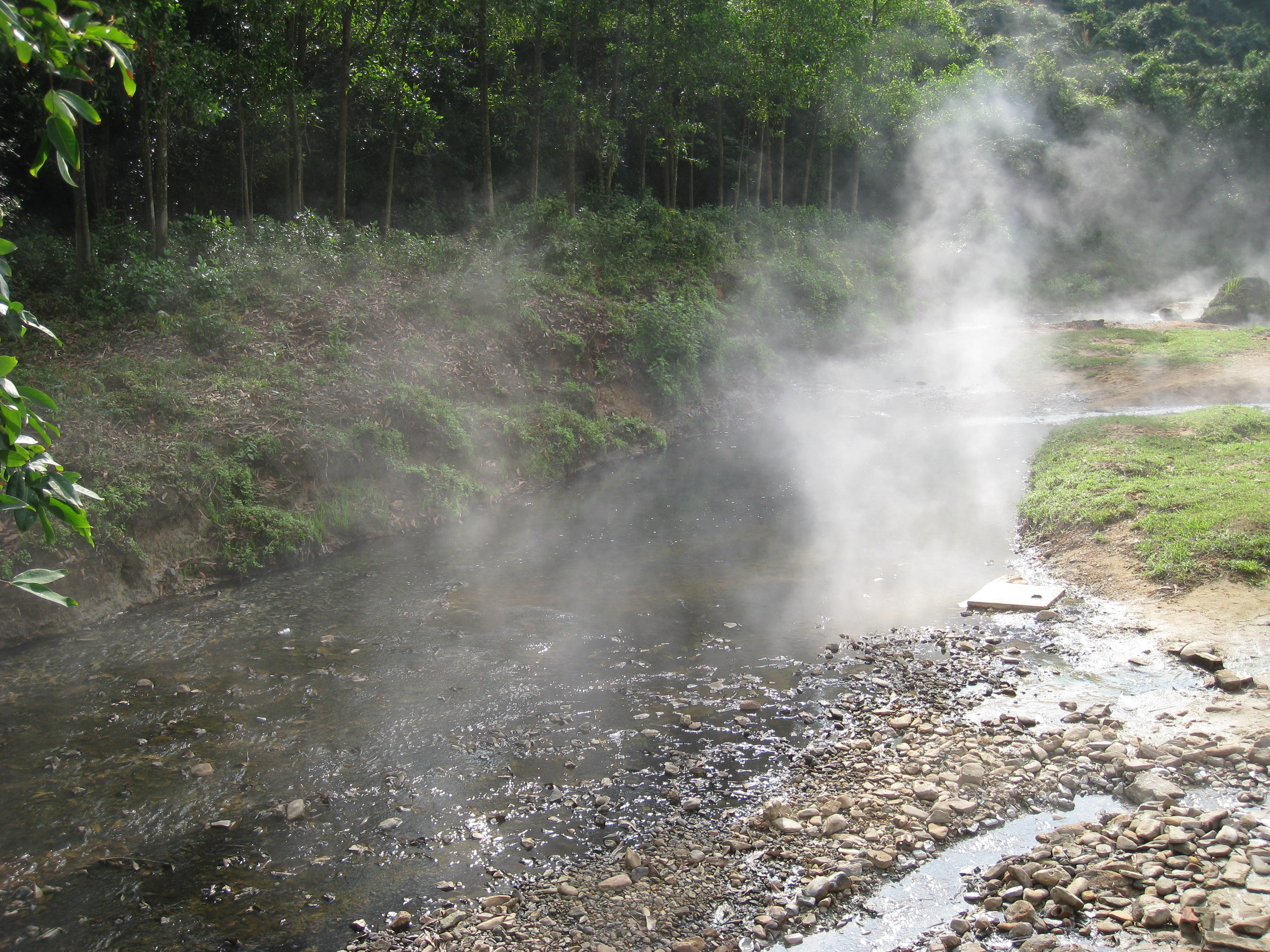
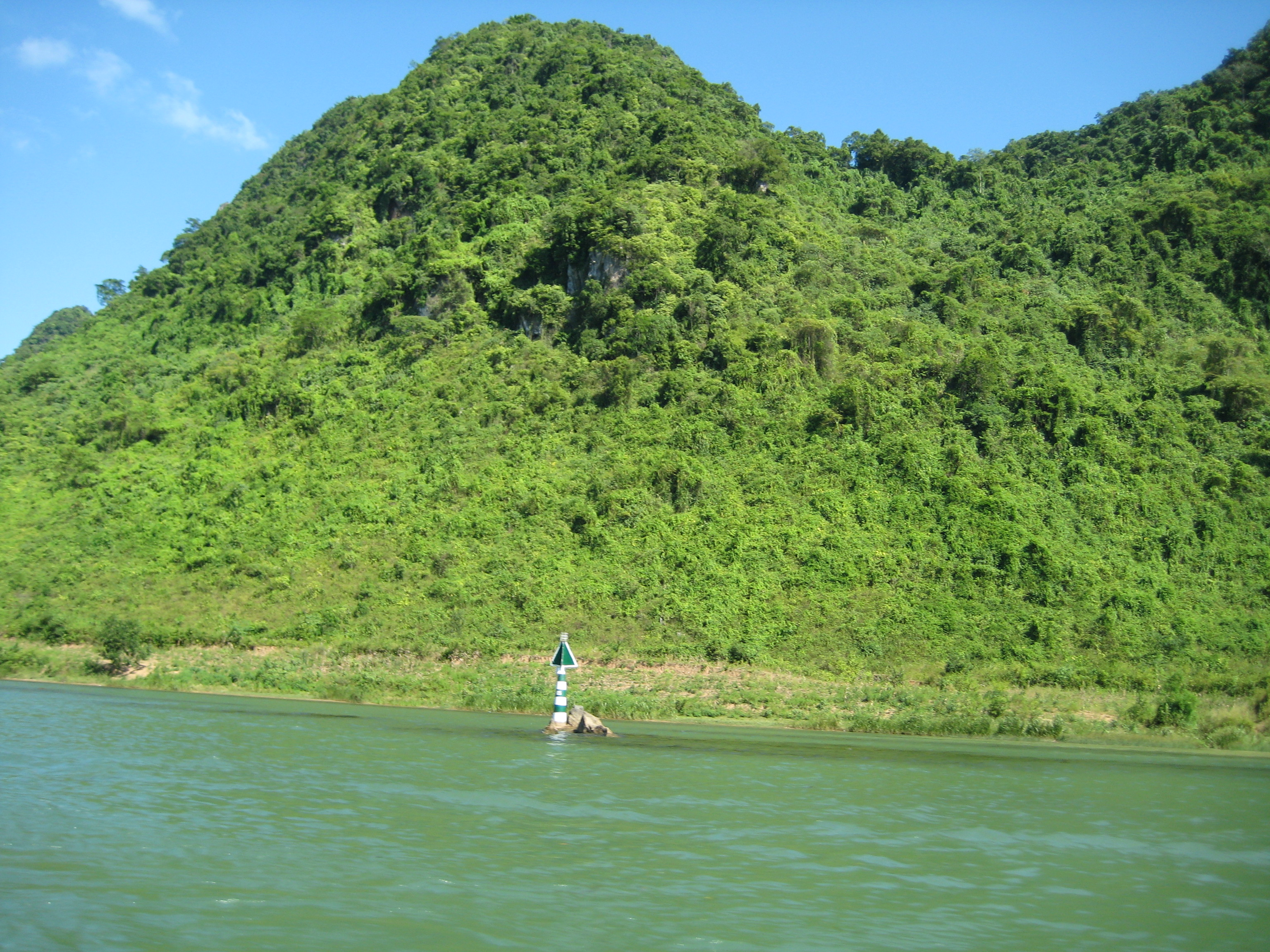
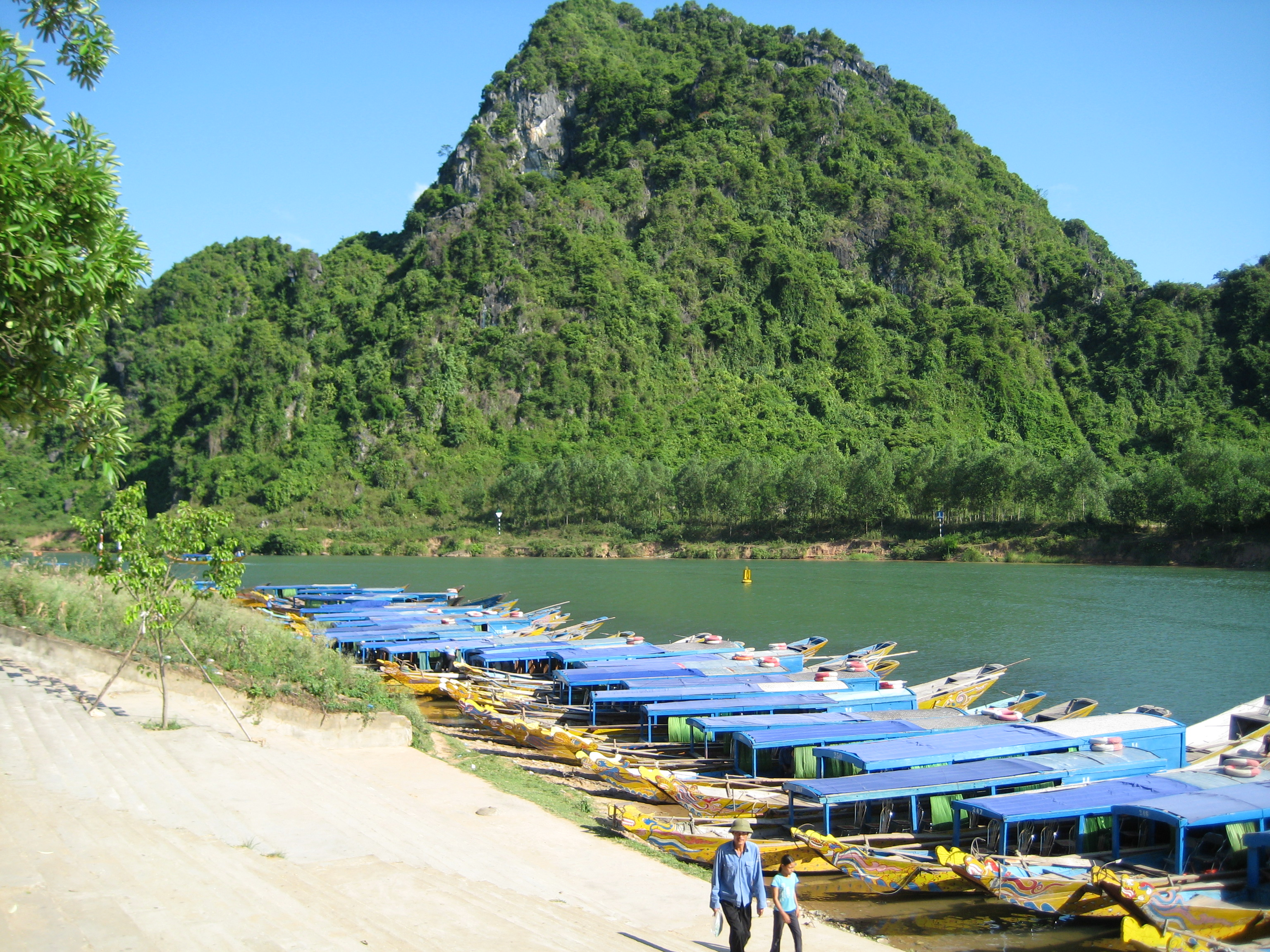
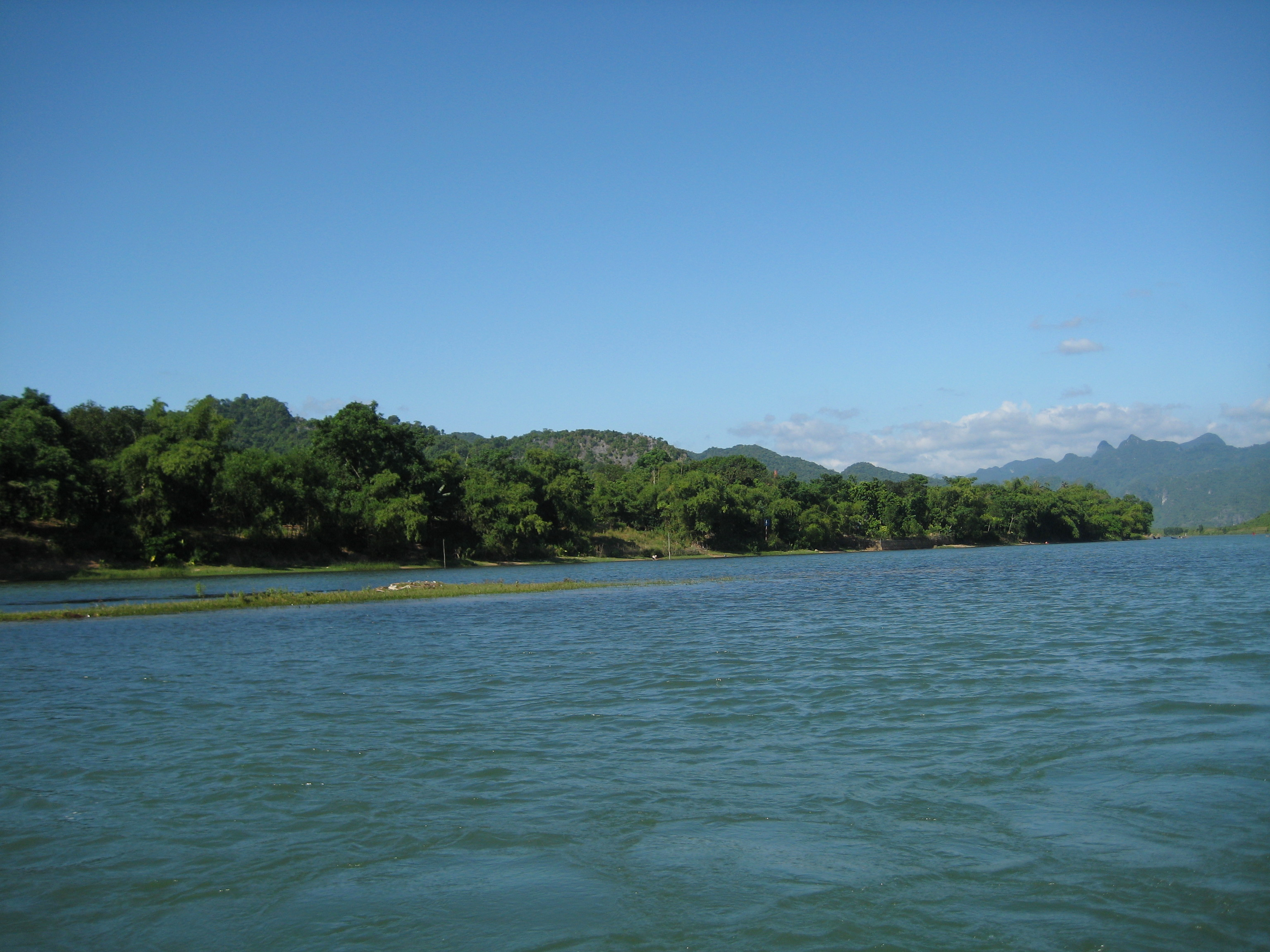
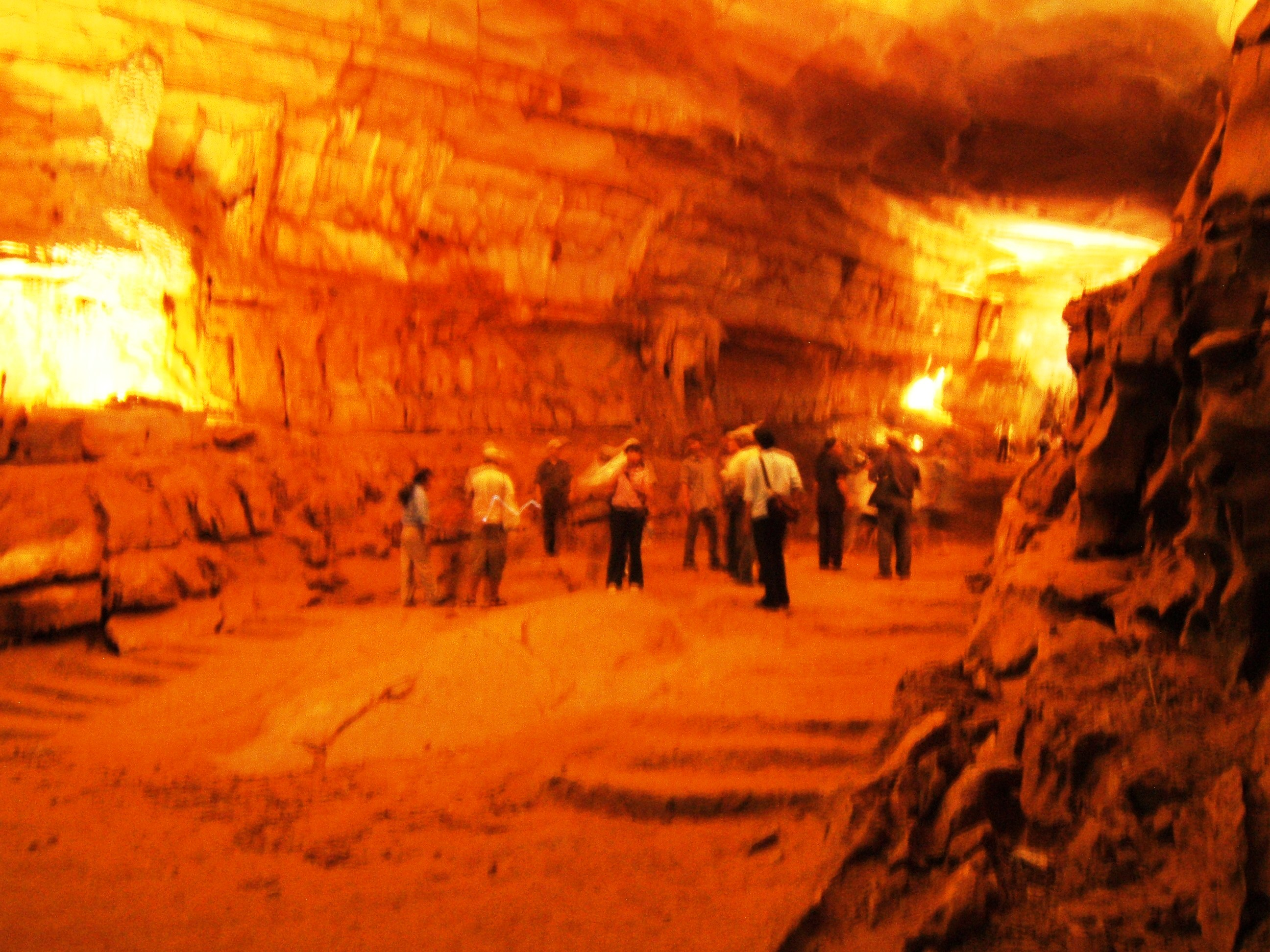
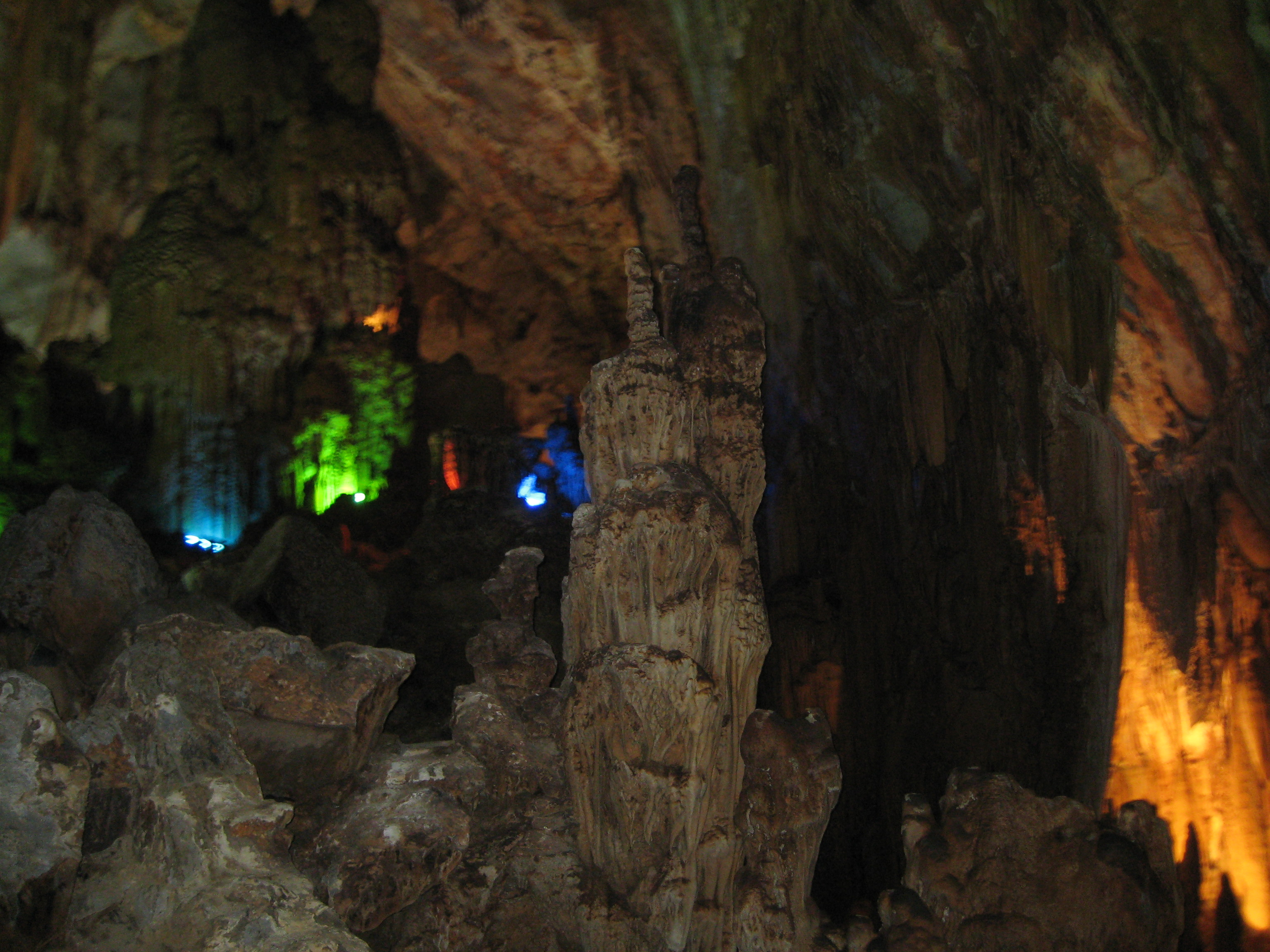
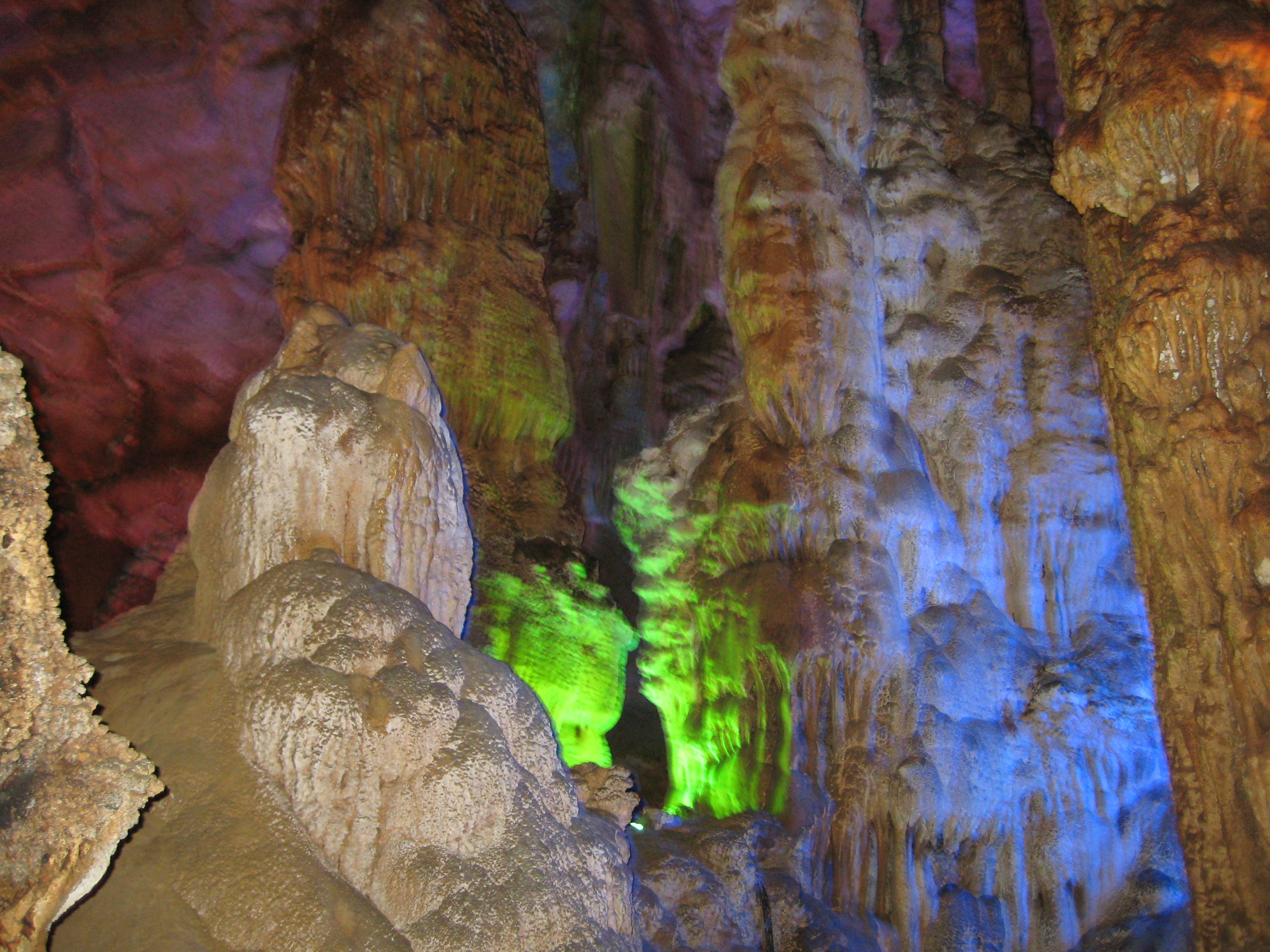
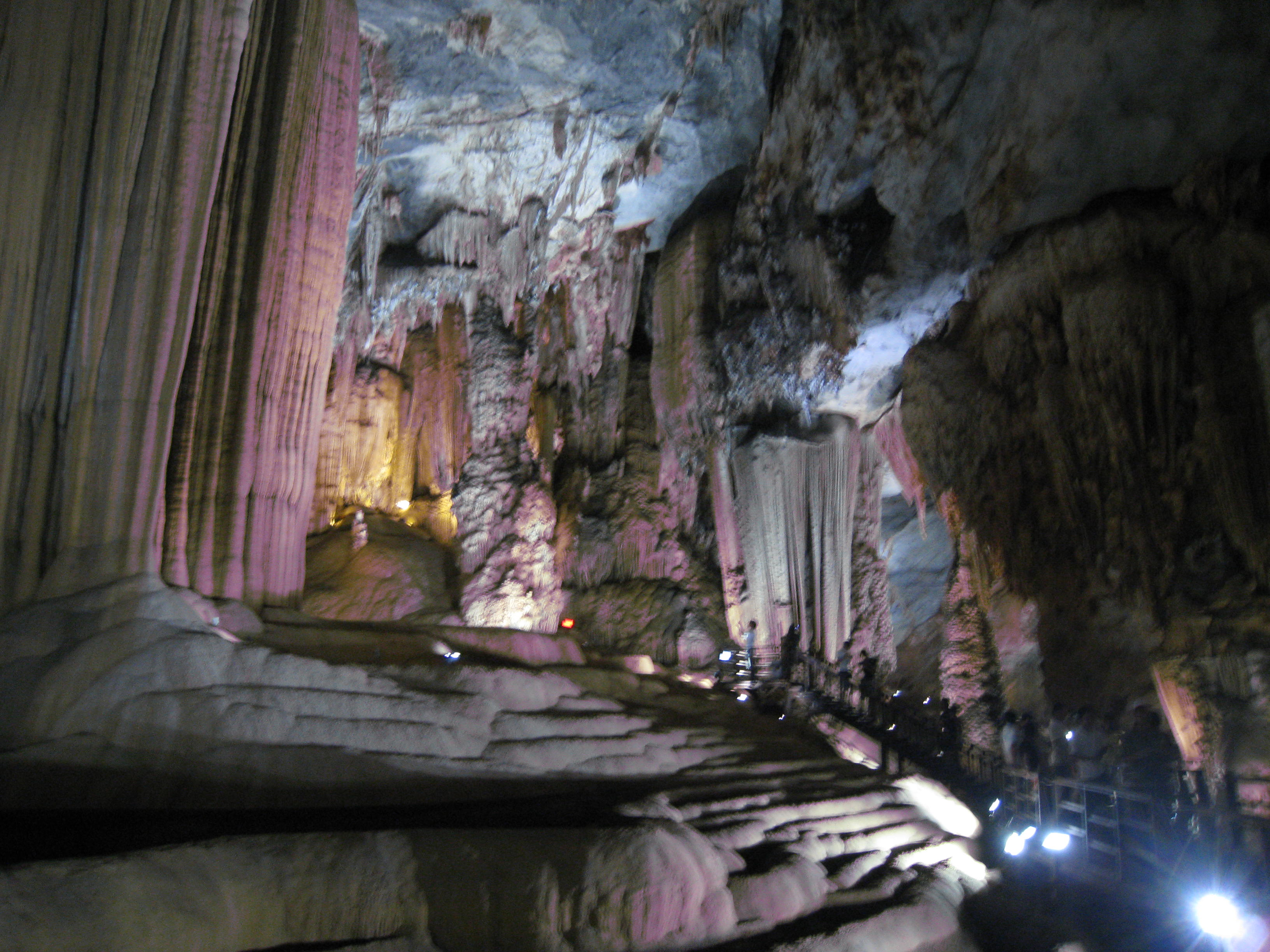
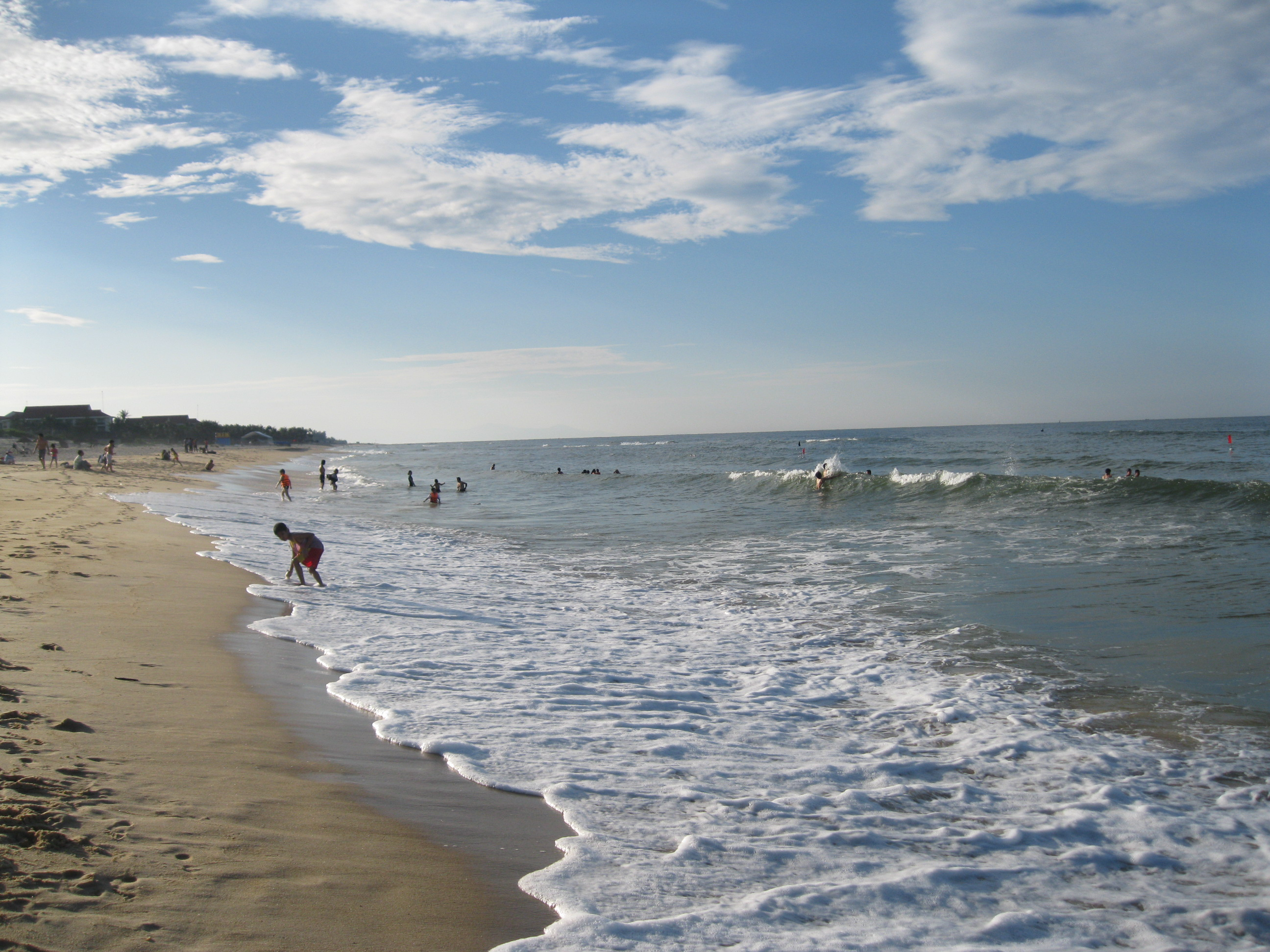
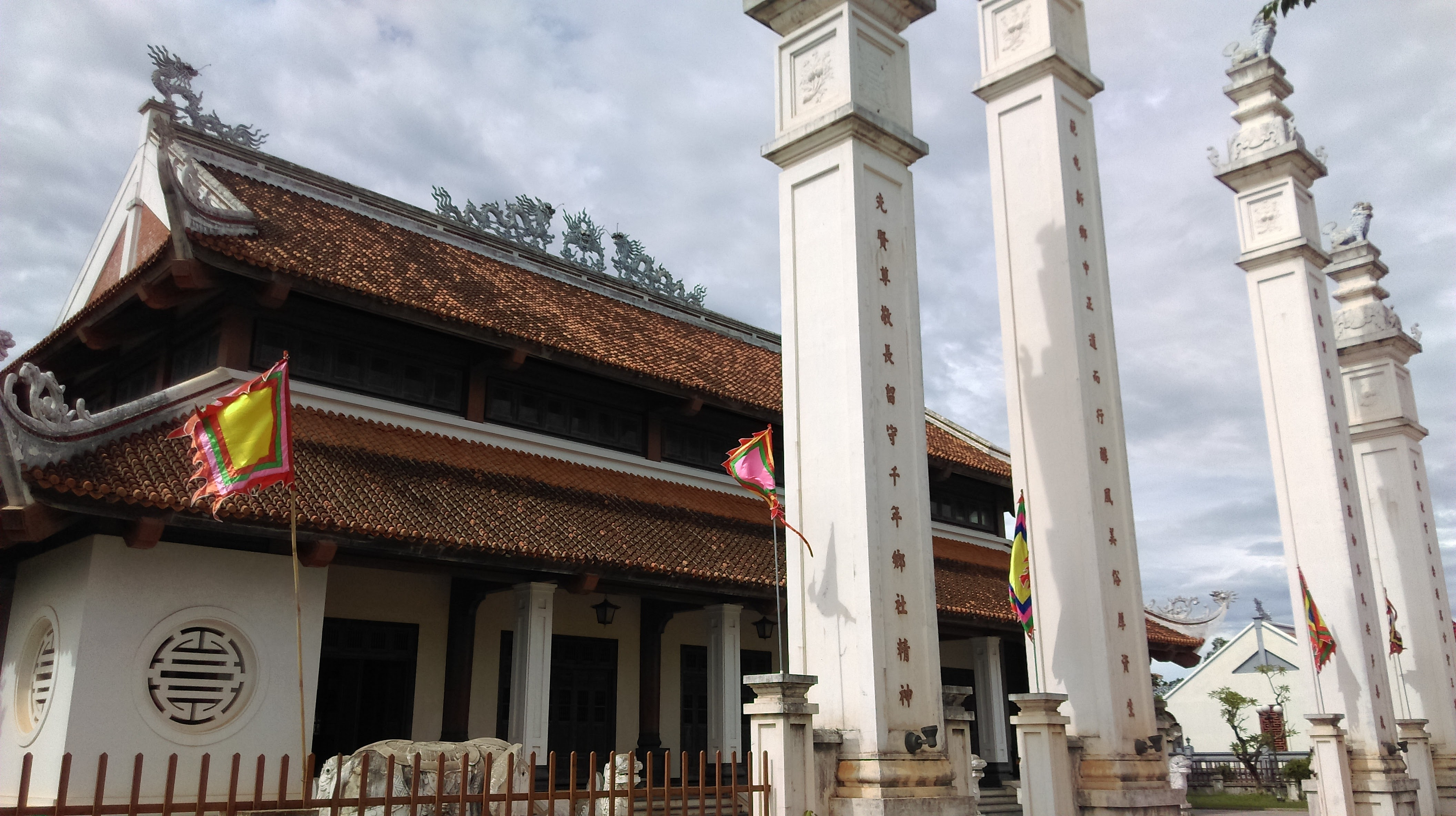
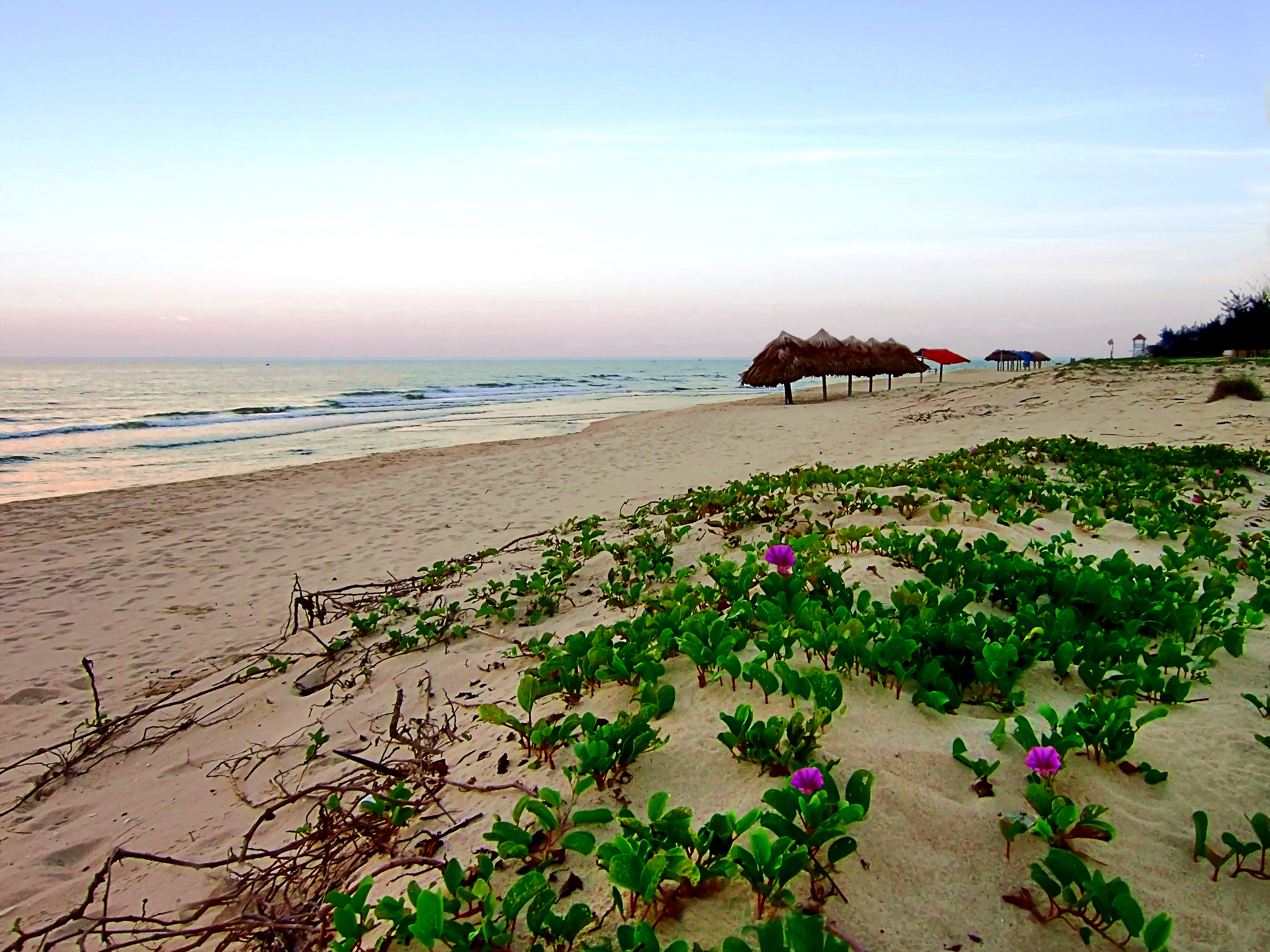
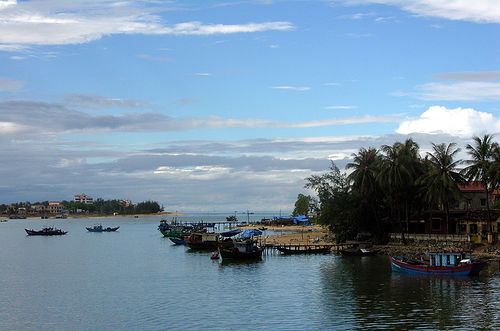
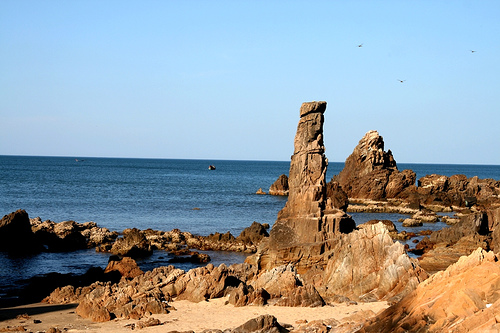
- Hang Sơn Đoòng • Cathedral Tam Tòa • Đồng Hới Citadel • Son River • Bang Spa • Phong Nha–Kẻ Bàng National Park • Bảo Ninh Beach • Đình Ba Đồn • Nhật Lệ Beach • Nhật Lệ River • Đá Nhảy Beach

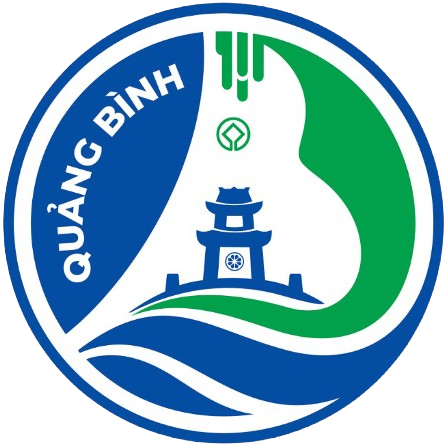
- Seal
- Nickname: Serenity
- Location of Quảng Bình within Vietnam
- Coordinates: 17°30′N 106°20′E
- Country: Vietnam
- Region: North Central Coast
- Capital: Đồng Hới

Government
  - People's Council Chair: Hoàng Đăng Quang
  - People's Committee Chair: Nguyen Huu Hoai

Area
  - Total: 7,998.80 km^{2} (3,088.35 sq mi)

Population (2025)
  - Total: 1,079,119
  - Density: 134.910/km^{2} (349.416/sq mi)

Demographics
  - Ethnicities: Vietnamese, Bru, Chứt, Tày

GDP
  - Total: VND 33.285 trillion US$ 1.444 billion
- Time zone: UTC+07:00 (ICT)
- Area codes: 232
- ISO 3166 code: VN-24
- HDI (2020): ▲0.704 (33th)
- Website: www.quangbinh.gov.vn

Quảng Bình was formerly a southern coastal province in the North Central Coast region, the Central of Vietnam. It borders Hà Tĩnh to the north, Quảng Trị to the south, Khammouane of Laos to the west and the Gulf of Tonkin (South China Sea) to the east.

On June 12, 2025, Quảng Bình was merged into Quảng Trị.

== History ==
Upon his accession, King Chế Củ of Champa adopted a hostile policy toward the Vietnamese. He reorganized his army and established a naval fleet. After paying tribute to King Lý Thánh Tông of Đại Việt in 1065, he instigated a conflict in 1068. King Lý Thánh Tông assembled an army, equipped a fleet, and launched a counterattack. In February 1069, the Đại Việt fleet scattered the Cham forces at the mouth of the Nhật Lệ River, sailed along the coast, landed at Thị Nại, and captured the capital, Vijaya (Chà Bàn) — north of Bình Định — which the Cham king had abandoned. The King of Đại Việt celebrated his victory in the Cham capital of Vijaya; the city was looted, and many of its inhabitants were deported as slaves. The fleeing king was captured near the border with Chenla and taken prisoner to Đại Việt. He secured the withdrawal of Vietnamese forces and his own release only by ceding three districts—Bố Chính, Địa-ly, and Ma-Linh—which correspond to the present-day Quảng Bình province and northern Quảng Trị province.

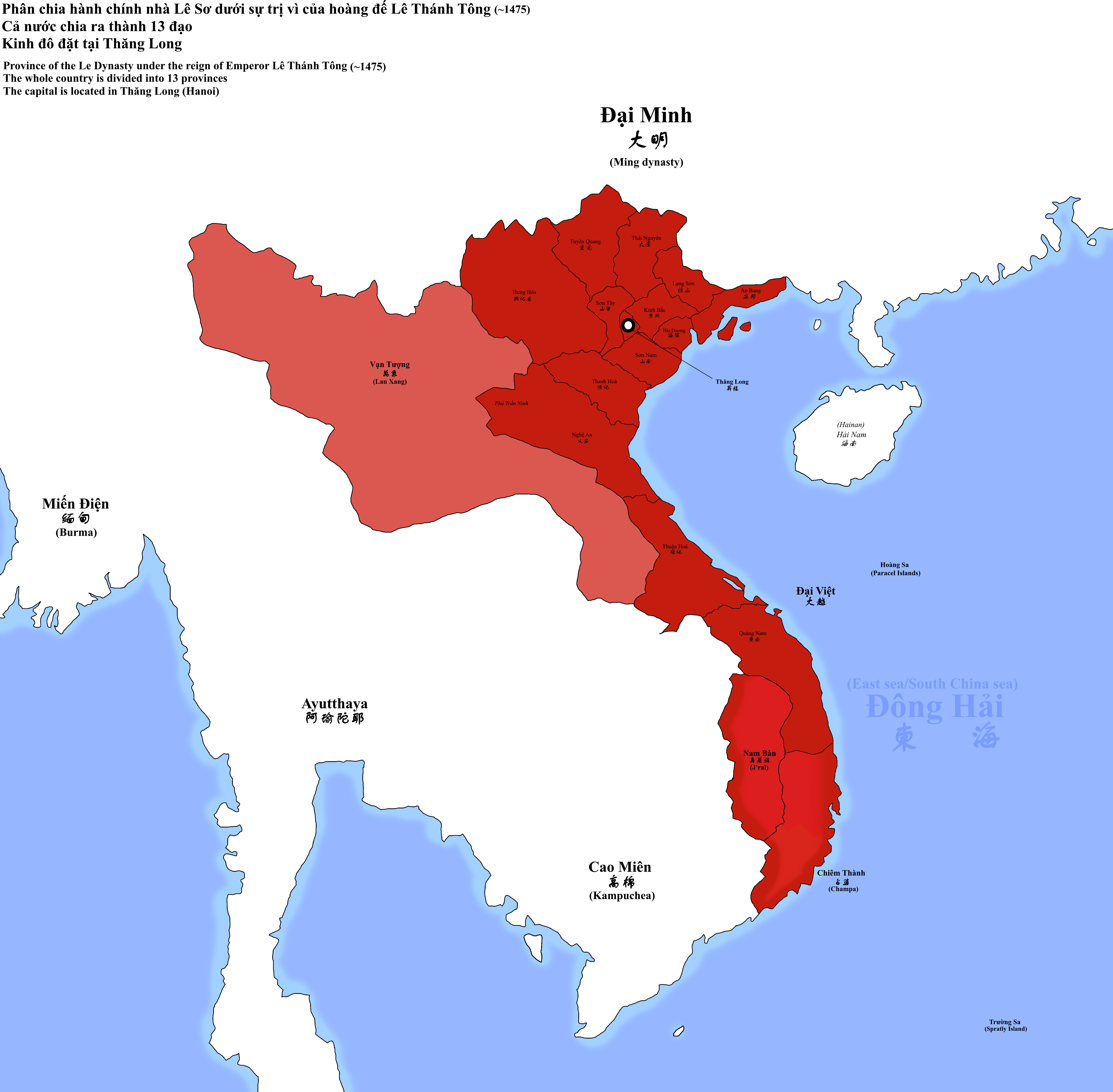
Regions of the Lê Dynasty under Emperor Lê Thánh Tông (~1475)

In the 10th year of Quang Thuận (1469), Quảng Bình was designated as Tân Bình prefecture (phủ) with four districts (Khang Lộc, Lệ Thủy, Minh Linh, Bố Chính) under Thuận Hóa province (thừa tuyên). Under Hoằng Định era (1599-1619), Tân Bình prefecture was renamed to Tiên Bình prefecture. In the 47th year of Gia Dụ (1604), Tiên Bình prefecture was redesignated as Quảng Bình prefecture.

The province has an area of 7,998.76 km^{2} (3,088.34 mi^{2}) and population of 913,860 inhabitants (as of 2022).

The site of present-day Quảng Bình was battlefields between Champa and An Nam until the Vietnamese territory was expanded further south by subsequent dynasties. Quảng Bình's importance expanded after Nguyễn Hoàng, a prince of Nguyễn lords was sent to the south by a king of the Later Lê dynasty. Leader Hoàng built his estate and turned it into Quảng Nam territory, a rival of the de facto Trịnh-controlled Đàng Ngoài. Quảng Bình became an important front to defend Đàng Trong from attack by Đàng Ngoài. Under French rule, this province was part of Annam. During the Vietnam War, this province became the southernmost province of the Democratic Republic of Vietnam (aka North Vietnam), only 20 km from the DMZ. This province was severely devastated by bombing from U.S. B-52s. This province is home to the World Heritage Phong Nha-Kẻ Bàng National Park. The province is also home to several famous Vietnamese persons, including revered Senior General Võ Nguyên Giáp, poet Hàn Mặc Tử, writer Bảo Ninh and the family of former South Vietnam President Ngô Đình Diệm.

On 12 June 2025, as part of major nationwide reforms, Quảng Bình province was dissolved and merged with Quảng Trị province.

== Geography ==
=== Location and area ===
The province occupies coordinates 16°55’ to 18°05’ North and 105°37’ to 107°00’ East. It borders Hà Tĩnh province on the north with the Ngang mountain pass as the natural frontier, Quảng Trị province to the south, Laos to the west, and faces the Dong Sea to the east. The narrowest part from east (seaside) to west (Laotian border) is just 40 km. The provincial topography is characterized by a general slope, higher in the west and lower in the east, with hilly and mountainous areas accounting for 85% of the total area. The Annamite Range is the natural border between Quảng Bình province and Laos with peaks ranging from 1,000 to 1,500 m, the summit of which is peak Phi Co Pi with the height of 2,017 m. In the east of the province are lower hills and then several narrow plains and river deltas. The seaside sand dunes belt is a natural dam that protects the land from the ocean tides.

The provincial land area is 8,037.9 km^{2} and divided as follows:

- Inhabited land: 41.45 km^{2}
- Agriculture: 1635.46 km^{2}
- Forest: 4912.62 km^{2}
- Specific usage: 199.36 km^{2}
- Unused: 26.01 km^{2}

Sand area accounts for 5.9% of the land, and alluvial soil accounts for only 2.8% of the land. The province's east coastline is 116.04 km long and the western borderline with Laos is 201.81 km long. The province owns 4866.88 km^{2} of forests, of which 4478.37 km^{2} is natural jungle, and 388.54 km^{2} is reforestation (including 175.97 km^{2} of pines).

The province is located at the coordinates:

- The northernmost point: 180 5'12" N
- The southernmost point: 170 5'02" N
- The westernmost point: 106 59'37" E
- The westernmost point: 105 36'55" E

The coastline is 116.04 km on the east, the borderline with Laos is 201.87 km on the west.

=== Rivers and sea ===
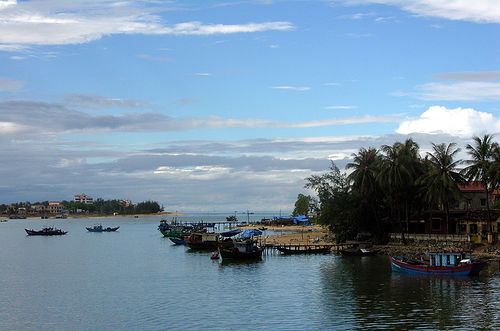
Nhật Lệ River, Quảng Bình province

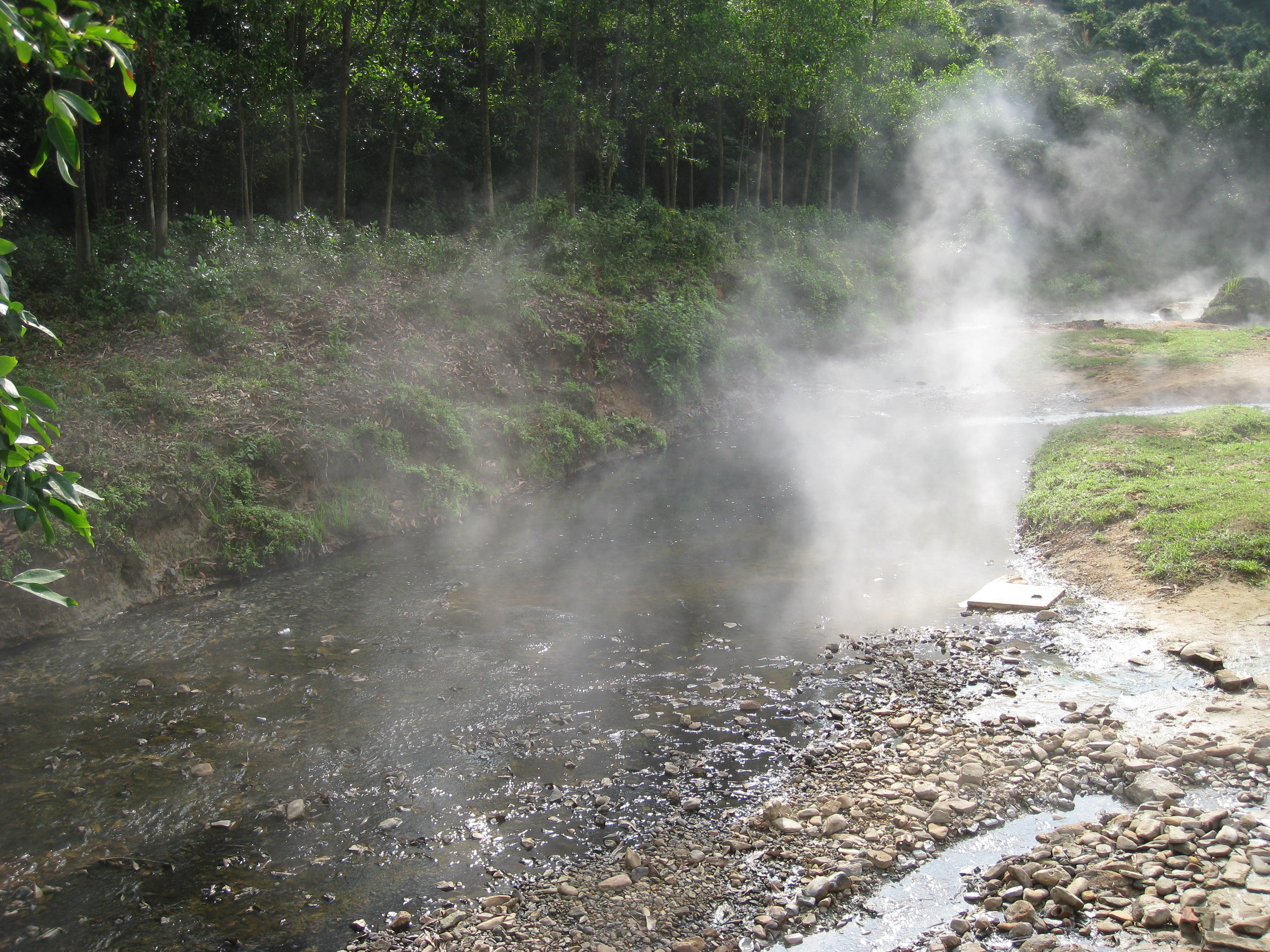
Bang Spa in Lệ Thủy District

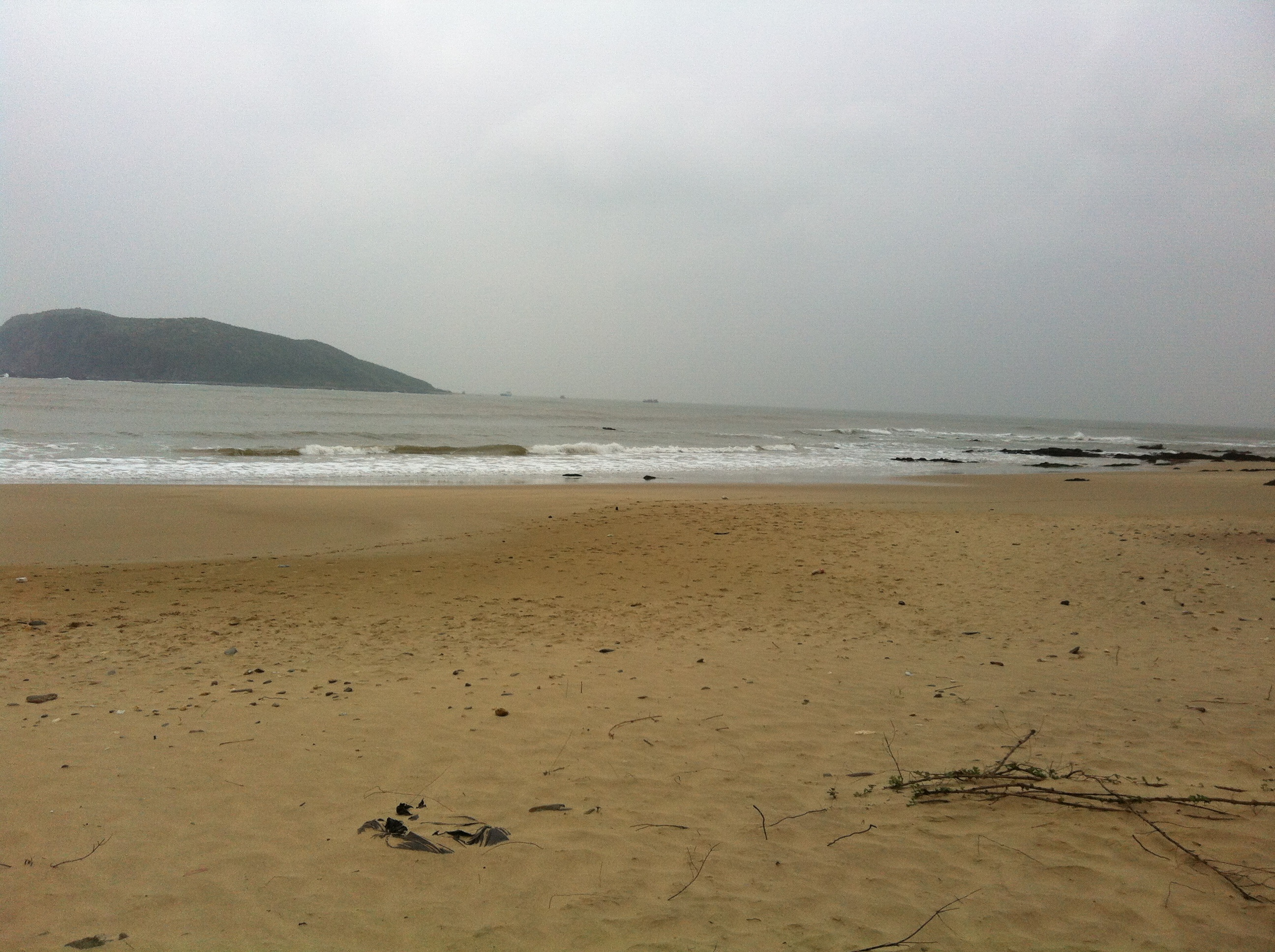
Vung Chua Beach in Quảng Bình

There are five major rivers in this province, as follows:

1. Gianh River (this historic river used to be the border splitting Vietnam into two countries during the Trịnh–Nguyễn War)
2. Ron River
3. Nhật Lệ River (the confluence of the Kiến Giang and Long Đại rivers)
4. Ly Hoa River
5. Dinh River
6. Kiến Giang River, Lệ Thủy District
7. Son River, Phong Nha-Kẻ Bàng

Most of the rivers originate in the Truong Son Range and empty into the Sea. River and stream density is 1.1 km/km^{2}. There are some 160 natural and man-made lakes with total water deposit of 234.3 million cubic meter of fresh water, Quảng Bình Province's sea area includes continental shelf and special economic area up to 20,000 km^{2}. Off the sea, there lie Hòn La islet, Hòn Gió islet, Hòn Nồm islet, Hòn Cỏ islet, Hòn Chùa islets with the total fishery capacity of 100,000 metric tonnes. Hòn La bay is a 4-square-km marine bay with the depth up to 15 m and a surrounding land of 4 km^{2} suitable to develop sea deep-water port and industrial park.

=== Mountains ===
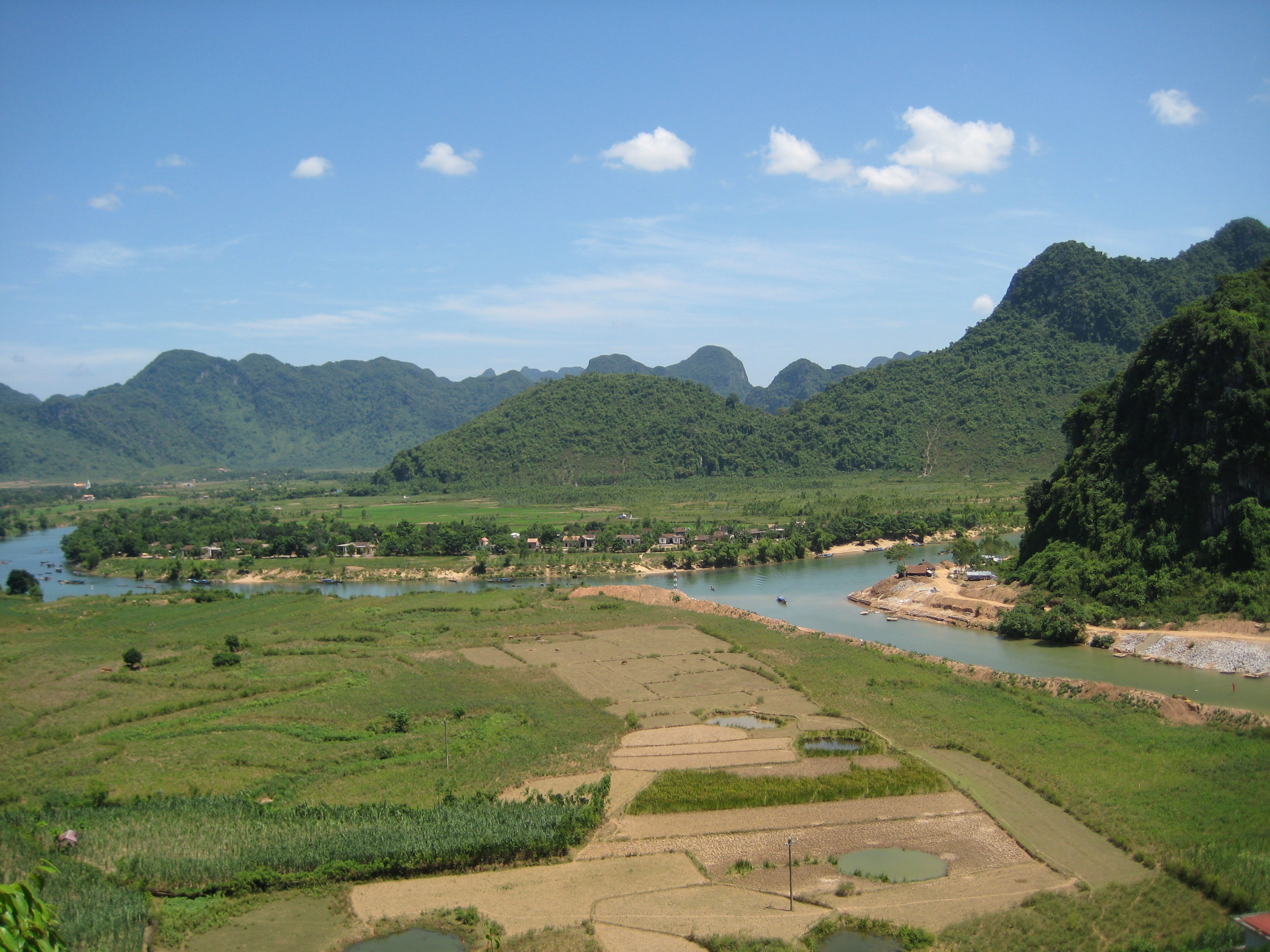
Part of the karst mounts in Phong Nha-Kẻ Bàng National Park

The Hoành Sơn Mountains run through the northeastern part of the province.

Many mount summits concentrate in Phong Nha-Kẻ Bàng area with over 1,000 metres height. Noteworthy peaks are the Peak Co Rilata with a height of 1,128 m and the Peak Co Preu with a height of 1,213 m. Mountains in karstic area of the park rise at typical height of above 800 m constitute a continuous range along Laotian-Vietnamese borderline, of which notable summits above 1000m are: Phu Tạo (1174m), Co Unet (1150m), Phu Canh (1095m), Phu Mun (1078m), Phu Tu En (1078m), Phu On Chinh (1068m), Phu Dung (1064m), Phu Tu Ôc (1053m), Phu Long (1015m), Phu Ôc (1015m), Phu Dong (1002m). Inserting into these summits are 800–1000 m high summits of Phu Sinh (965m), Phu Co Tri (949m), Phu On Boi (933m), Phu Tu (956m), Phu Toan (905m), Phu Phong (902m), and Ma Ma (835m).

=== Climate ===
There are four separate seasons here: in spring (from February to April), it is warm with slight rains, humid and the temperature around 18 to 25 degrees Celsius. In the summer (from May to July), it is hot, dry with little downpours, the temperature may reach up to 35 to 36 degrees Celsius. In the fall, it is rainy, cool with temperature around 22 to 28 degrees Celsius. In the winter, it is humid, slight rain with temperature about 12 to 16 degrees Celsius. Annual average precipitation is around 2,000-2,300 mm. Heaviest rainy season is from September to November. From April to August is the dry season. The hottest months are from June to August.

== Biodiversity ==
=== Flora ===
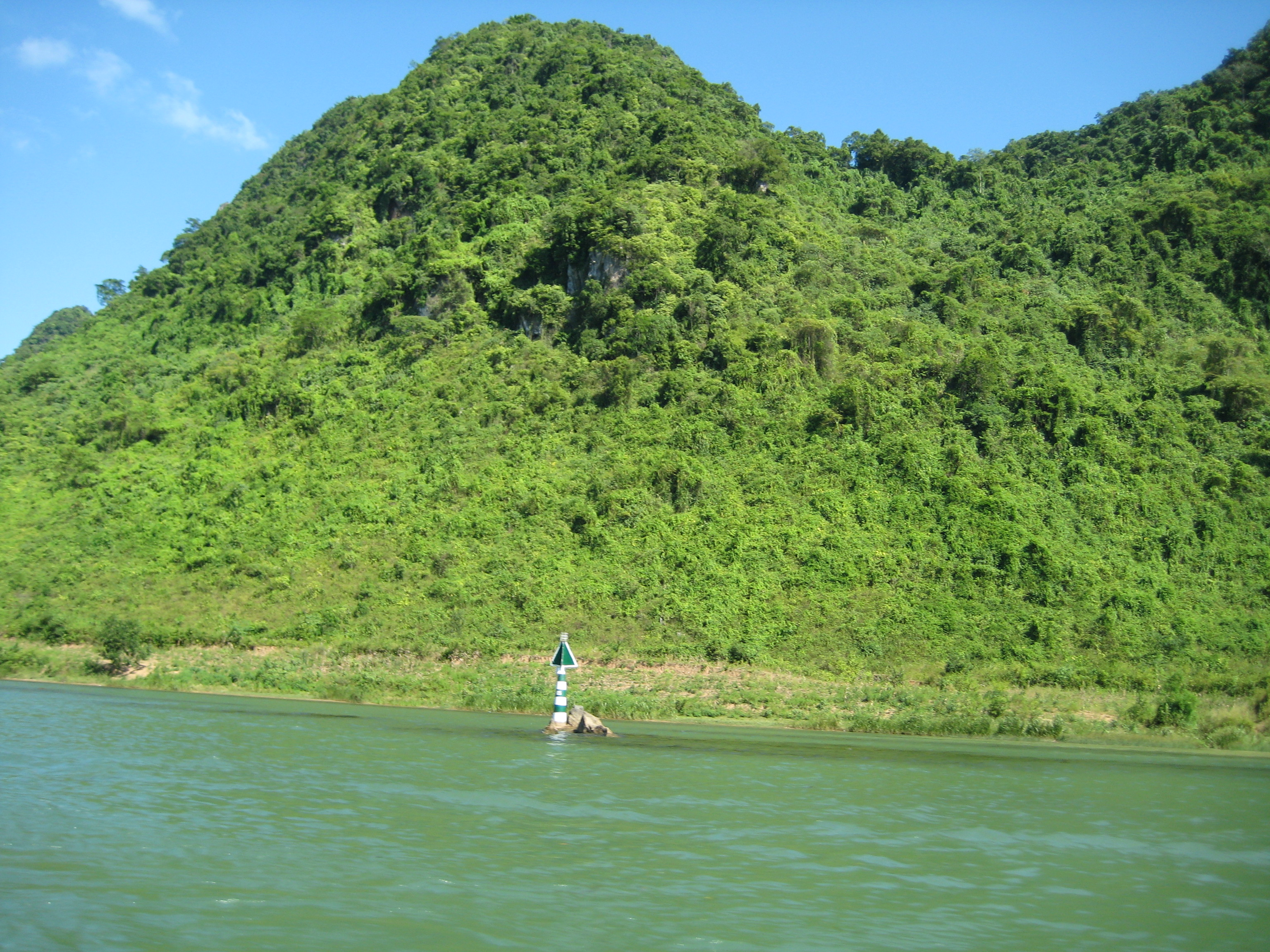
Trees on the limestone mounts, a typical florae in Phong Nha-Kẻ Bàng National Park

Quảng Bình province is endowed with biodiversity, especially typical of Annamites eco-region. According to the results of initial surveys, the primary tropical forest in Phong Nha-Kẻ Bàng is home to 140 families, 427 genera, and 751 species of vascular plants, of which 36 species are considered endangered and listed in the Vietnam's Red Data Book. The most common tree species in this park are Hopea sp., Sumbaviopsis albicans, Garcinia fagraeoides, Burretiodendron hsienmu, Chukrasia tabularis, Photinia arboreum and Diospyros salletii. Seedlings can only grow in holes and cracks in the limestone where soil has accumulated, so in general regeneration after disturbance is slow. The forest type in this national park is dominated by evergreen tree species with scattered deciduous trees such as Dipterocarpus kerri, Anogeissus acuminata, Pometia pinnata and Lagerstroemia calyculata. In Phong Nha-Kẻ Bàng, the dominant plant families are the Lauraceae, Fabaceae, Theaceae and Rosaceae, with some scattered gymnosperms such as Podocarpus imbricatus, Podocarpus neriifolius, and Nageia fleuryi.

In the national park there is a 5000-ha forest of Calocedrus macrolepis on limestone (Calocedrus rupestris) mounts with about 2,500 trees, 600 per hectare. This is the largest forest of this tree in Vietnam. Most of these trees here are 500–600 years old. These trees are listed in group 2A (rare, precious and limited exploitation) of the official letter 3399/VPCP-NN dated 21 June 2002, an amendment to Decree 48 by the Government of Vietnam. Biologists discovered three rare orchid species. Orchids found here include: Paphiopedilum malipoense, Paphiopedilum dianthum, Paphiopedilum concolor. In 1996, IUCN classified these orchid species in danger of extinction in the near future.

Endemic species in Phong Nha-Kẻ Bàng National Park include: Burretiodendron hsienmu, Cryptocarya lenticellata, Deutzianthus tonkinensis, Eberhardtia tonkinensis, Heritiera macrophylla, Hopea sp., Illicium parviflorum, Litsea baviensis, Madhuca pasquieri, Michelia foveolata, Peltophorum tonkinensis, Semecarpus annamensis, Sindora tonkinensis.

=== Fauna ===
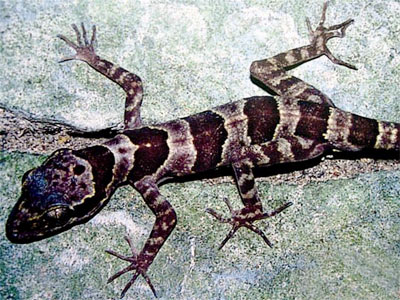
Cyrtodactylus phongnhakebangensis, a newly discovered species in Phong Nha-Kẻ Bàng National Park

The forests of Quảng Bình, particularly in Phong Nha-Kẻ Bàng, are home to at least 98 families, 256 genera and 381 species of vertebrates. 66 animal species are listed in Vietnam's Red Data Book and 23 other species in the World Red Book of Endangered Species. In 2005, a new species of skink (Lygosoma boehmeiwas) was discovered here by a group of Vietnamese biologists together with biologists working for the park, Cologne Zoo in Germany and the Saint Petersburg Wild Zoology Institute in Russia.

The gaur and one species of eel have been discovered in this park. 10 new species previously unknown in Vietnam were discovered by scientists in the park. Phong Nha-Kẻ Bàng is home as well to a significant population of primates in Vietnam, with ten species and subspecies. These include the globally vulnerable pig-tailed macaque, Assam macaque, stump-tailed macaque, Hatinh langur, and white-cheeked crested gibbon (Nomascus leucogenys and Nomascus leucogenys siki). The park is home to one of the largest populations of François' langur in Vietnam, including two different forms of the species. The area is known for its population of Hatinh and black langurs. 10 species of bats listed in the IUCN List of Threatened Species are recorded in this park. Of the 59 recorded reptile and amphibian species, 18 are listed in Vietnam's Red Data Book and 6 are listed in the IUCN Red List of Threatened Animals. The 72 fish species include 4 species endemic to the area, including Danio quangbinhensis.

The park is home to over 200 bird species, including such rare birds as the chestnut-necklaced partridge, red-collared woodpecker, brown hornbill, sooty babbler and the short-tailed scimitar babbler. An initiative survey conducted by Russian and Vietnamese scientists from Vietnam-Russia Tropical Centre (funded by WWF) recorded 259 butterfly species of 11 families. Almost all major butterfly taxa in Vietnam can be found in Phong Nha-Kẻ Bàng.

== Administration ==
Quảng Bình is subdivided into 8 district-level sub-divisions :

- 6 districts:
  - Bố Trạch
  - Lệ Thủy
  - Minh Hóa
  - Quảng Ninh
  - Quảng Trạch
  - Tuyên Hóa
- 1 district-level town:
  - Ba Đồn (newly created since 2013)
- 1 provincial city:
  - Đồng Hới (capital)

They are further subdivided into 7 commune-level towns (or townlets), 136 communes, and 16 wards.

These in turn are further subdivided into villages (lang or thon). Like administrative system of Vietnam, the leader of each administrative unit is the secretary of the local Communist Party Cell. Each administrative unit includes a people's council, who elects a people's committee to execute its daily affairs.

== Culture and education ==
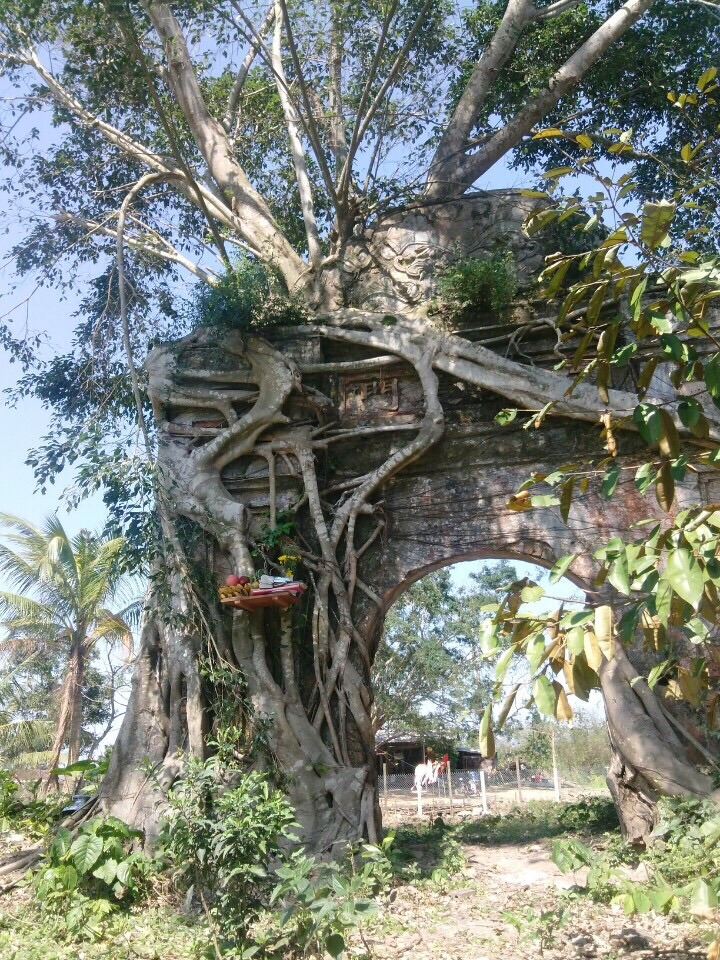
Hoằng Phúc Pagoda in Mỹ Thủy

The province is home to Quảng Bình University, a newly established university from the Normal College of Quảng Bình. This university has faculties of business administration, normal faculty and informatics faculty.

There are several high schools and primary schools in counties. Inhabitants here regards education as family tradition and the most important means to make ends meet and to eliminate poverty. Quảng Bình province is the land of rich culture and famous people. There is an archaeological site of Bàu Tró, Phù Lưu ancient bronze drums in the time of Dong Son's culture.

On 3 July 2007, an earthen pot of ancient coins weighing 20 kg was found buried at 500 cm underground in a paddy field and later sold for US$12.5 per kilo. This site is located in Tran Xa village, Ham Ninh commune, Quảng Ninh district. The coins were from the Tang dynasty period. Compared to other provinces in areas surrounding Hanoi and Ho Chi Minh City and Đà Nẵng, Quảng Bình is the poorest province. Therefore, more and more young and educated here find their ways to the big cities and more industrialized provinces. In each commune (xã, a rural subdivision of a district), there is a clinic and there is a hospital in every county, in Đồng Hới city, there are more. The Đồng Hới Hospital, which was donated by Cuba, was built in the 1980s.

== Economy ==
The provincial GDP per capita is one of the lowest of Vietnam (around US$1500, compared to Vietnam's average GDP per capita of US$2385). Industries base on mainly construction material production (cement, tiles, building rock, brick) thanks to its abundance in limestone and white clay deposits. The province has two industrial parks, one in Đồng Hới city and the other in Hon La bay. Sea food processing, bio-fertilizer and aluminum production are also important to this provincial economy. Over 80% of the population live on agricultural production. In recent years, tourism has been emerged as the significant contribution to Quảng Bình thanks to Phong Nha-Kẻ Bàng National Park and white fine sand beaches. Trade conducted with Laos through Cha Lo gate by National Road 12. In 2005, this province's export value is just 30 million US$ or 1% of Vietnam's export revenue. In 2012, the province contributed 1840 billion VND (US$90 million) to the state budget (of the total US$37.68 billion) or 0.24% only

The province's agriculture is comprehensively developed with the direction of production of commodities. Crops and cultivation calendar have been gradually arranged in a more appropriate manner. The food production has been continuously increased reaching 200,000 tons in 2000. The total area of industrial trees is 14,105ha, of which the area of rubber is 6,400 ha providing 2,000 tons of dried resin. Cattle and husbandry keep growing. The average agriculture growth rate is 5.7% during the period 1996–2000. In the recent years, forestry production in Quảng Bình province has been changed in terms of structure from mainly exploiting to protecting, developing forest for forest resource conservation. The value of forestry and afforestation has increased 87.3%, in particular from 1996 to 2000 the growth rate was 65.3%. The annual forestation area is around 4,000 ha. Up to date 38,851 ha of forest has been planted.

The fishery sector has continuously developed and become a key economic sector of the province. At present the province has around 3,200 fishing boats with power of over 67,000CV. In the year 2000, the output of sea products is estimated at 17,104 tons, of which about 1,600 tons is from raising. The province has 3 shrimp nursery stations, 8 fish nursery stations supplying 5–7 mil. tiger baby shrimps, 40–45mil. baby fish and 4–5 mil. fingerlings annually. At present the province has 2 factories of processing frozen sea products and 4 factories of processing dried products for exportation. The services of fishing sector such as making and repairing ships, purchasing, processing sea products and providing technical assistance and infrastructure for fishing are continuously developed. However, the development of the fishery sector in recent years has not met its expected potential. As of February 2008, the province licensed 59 investment projects with a total capitalization of US$500,000,000. As of 2009, this province is home to two special economic zones with preferential investment and tax treatments, namely the Hòn La Economic Zone by the Hòn La seaport, and Cha Lo Border Gate Economic Zone in the border with Laos.

== Landscapes and attractions ==
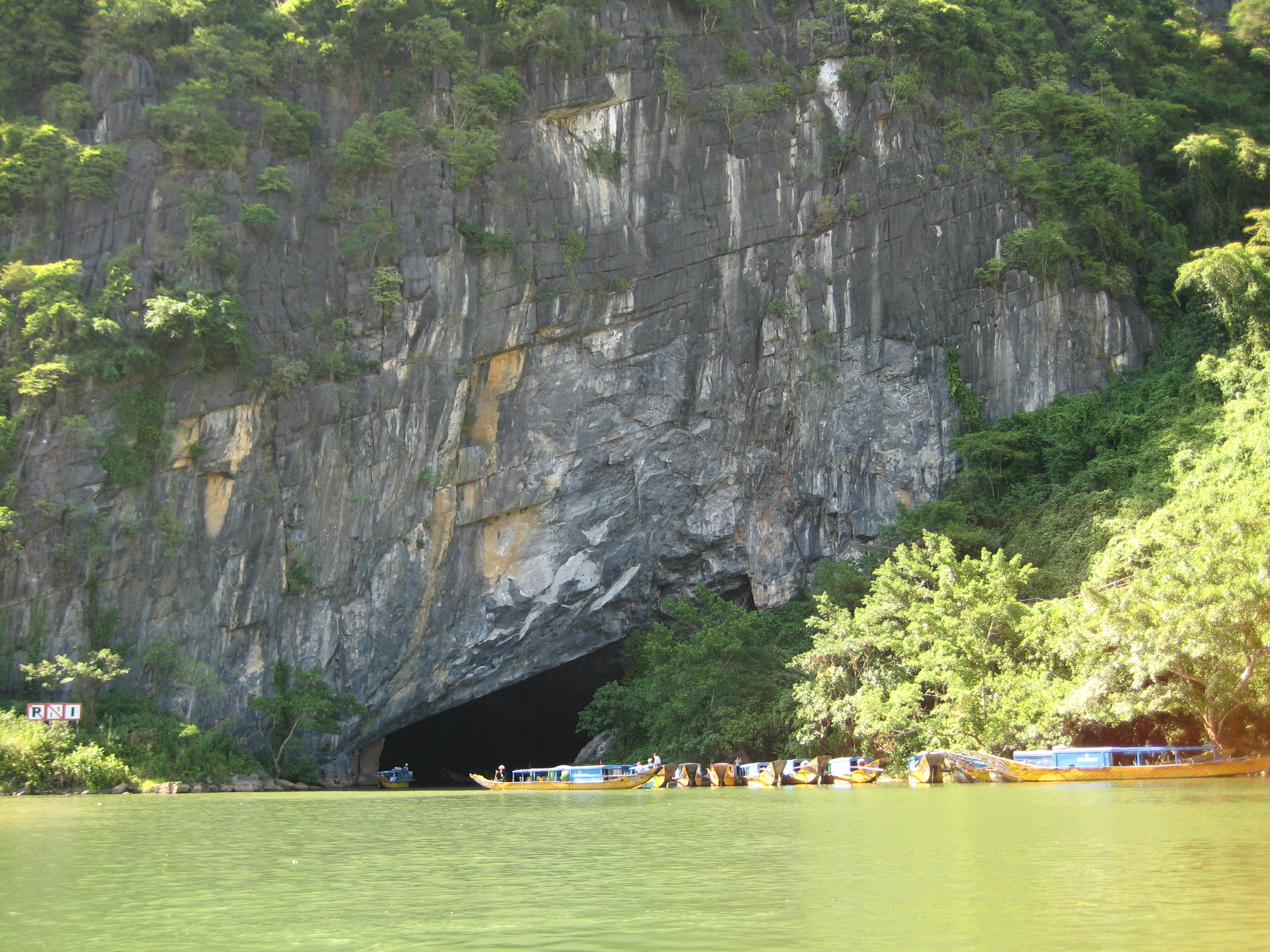
The mouth of Phong Nha Cave, one of the caves with underground river in Phong Nha-Kẻ Bàng National Park, Quảng Bình province

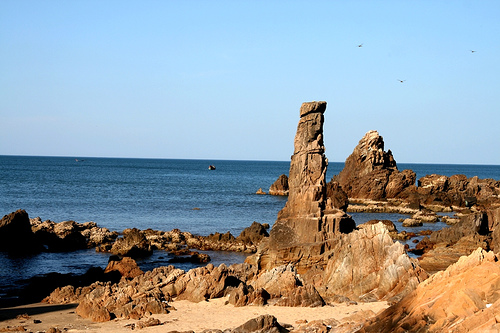
Đá Nhảy Beach, Quảng Bình

Quảng Bình has several tourist attraction sites that could be turned into tourism development.

- Phong Nha-Kẻ Bàng National Park: This park features a karst region of more than 200,000 km^{2} if Hin Namno region in Laos bordering this park is combined. Phong Nha-Kẻ Bàng is a protected area, a national park and was listed in UNESCO's world heritage in 2003. Phong Nha-Kẻ Bàng is located in the Bố Trạch and Minh Hóa districts, in North Central Coast, Vietnam, about 50 km northwest of Đồng Hới, 42 km east of South China Sea from its borderline point. Phong Nha-Kẻ Bàng is situated in a limestone zone of 200,000 hectare in Vietnamese territory and borders another limestone of 200,000 hectare of Hin Namno in Laotian territory. The core zone of this national park covers 85,754 hectares and a buffer zone of 195,400 ha. The park was created to protect one of the world's two largest karst regions with 300 caves and grottoes and also protects the ecosystem of limestone forest of the Annamite Range region in North Central Coast of Vietnam.

Phong Nha-Kẻ Bàng National Park is noted for its system of some 300 cave and grotto systems with a total length of about 70 km, of which only 20 have been surveyed by Vietnamese and British scientists; 17 of these are in located in the Phong Nha area and three in the Kẻ Bàng area. Phong Nha holds several world cave records, as it has the longest underground river, as well as the largest caverns and passageways. Following UNESCO listing of this park, the number of visitors to this province changed significantly. Tourists mainly visit Phong Nha, Tien Son and Thiên Đường caves, Hang Én and Hang Pygmy. Sơn Đoòng Cave is open to visitors through a limited, guided adventure tour program, with strict regulations to protect its natural environment.

- Đá Nhảy, Ly Hoa and Nhật Lệ beaches feature white and fine sands, clean water, and are among the most attractive beaches in Vietnam
- Bang Spa: a hotspring area in Lệ Thủy District with resort and health care services. The temperature of the water at the jet hole can reach up to 105 degree Celsius.
- Ho Chi Minh trail, many important sites along the trail during Vietnam War.

The great natural landscapes of Quang Binh have been used in the movie: Kong: Skull Island.

== Transportation ==
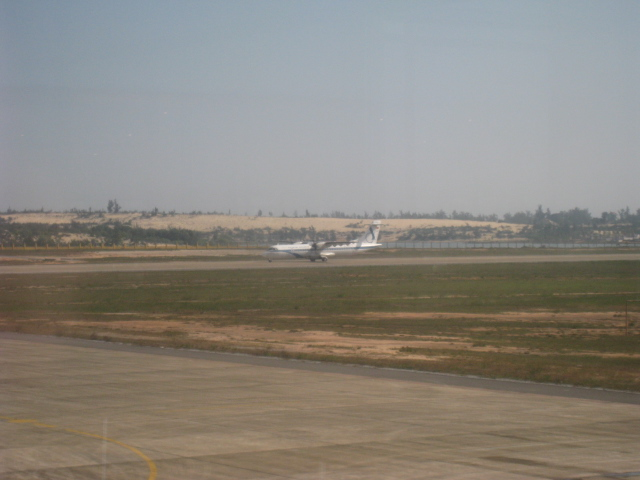
Đồng Hới Airport in Đồng Hới, Quảng Bình province

Quảng Bình has well-developed transportation infrastructure including an airport, seaport, roadways, railways and riverways. Dong Hoi Airport currently is serviced by three airlines including Vietnam Airlines, VietJet Air and Jetstar Pacific, with flights to and from the major cities of Vietnam such as Ha Noi, Ho Chi Minh City, and Hai Phong. In August 2017, Jetstar Pacific will launch a Chiang Mai–Dong Hoi international flight. The road and rail systems, border economic zones and ports are likewise interlinked. There are two national highways – National Route 1A and Ho Chi Minh Highway – and the North–South railway running along the length of the province, the Cha Lo Border Gate Economic Zone, which extends into Laos, and Hon La deep water seaport which is capable of vessels of 30,000–50,000 tonnes. Going east to west, National Road 12A connects Hon La deep-water seaport 2 to Cha Lo Border Gate Economic Zone (with Laos) via Huu Nghi No.3 Bridge to Thailand, Myanmar and Southeast Asian nations with the length of about 350 km. Located in the East West Economic Corridor (EWEC), Quang Binh is an important point of commercial exchange within the region and the world.

== Demographics ==
The provincial population is 882,500 (2016). There are 24 ethnic groups living here, predominantly Kinh, Vân Kiều and Chứt. Other minorities are in very small quantity with 100 persons each. All of the 23 ethnic minority groups live in mountainous areas. The province has the highest number of Vietic languages spoken in Vietnam, including Vietnamese, Nguồn, Arem, Maleng and Chứt.

The provincial population is unevenly distributed, with more than 90% living in around 10% of the provincial land while just 10% live in 90% mountainous and sand areas. 80% of inhabitants lives in rural areas, 20% lives in urban areas. 47.08% of the population (380,306) was in the labor force in 2000, 72% of whom work in rural sectors (agriculture and sylviculture) and 10.9% in urban areas (industrial, service and commercial sectors). There are 10,720 university graduates and postgraduates (4,676 college graduates and 6042 university graduates) in 2000. Of blue-collar workers, only 35,000 have passed appropriate training courses.

== History ==
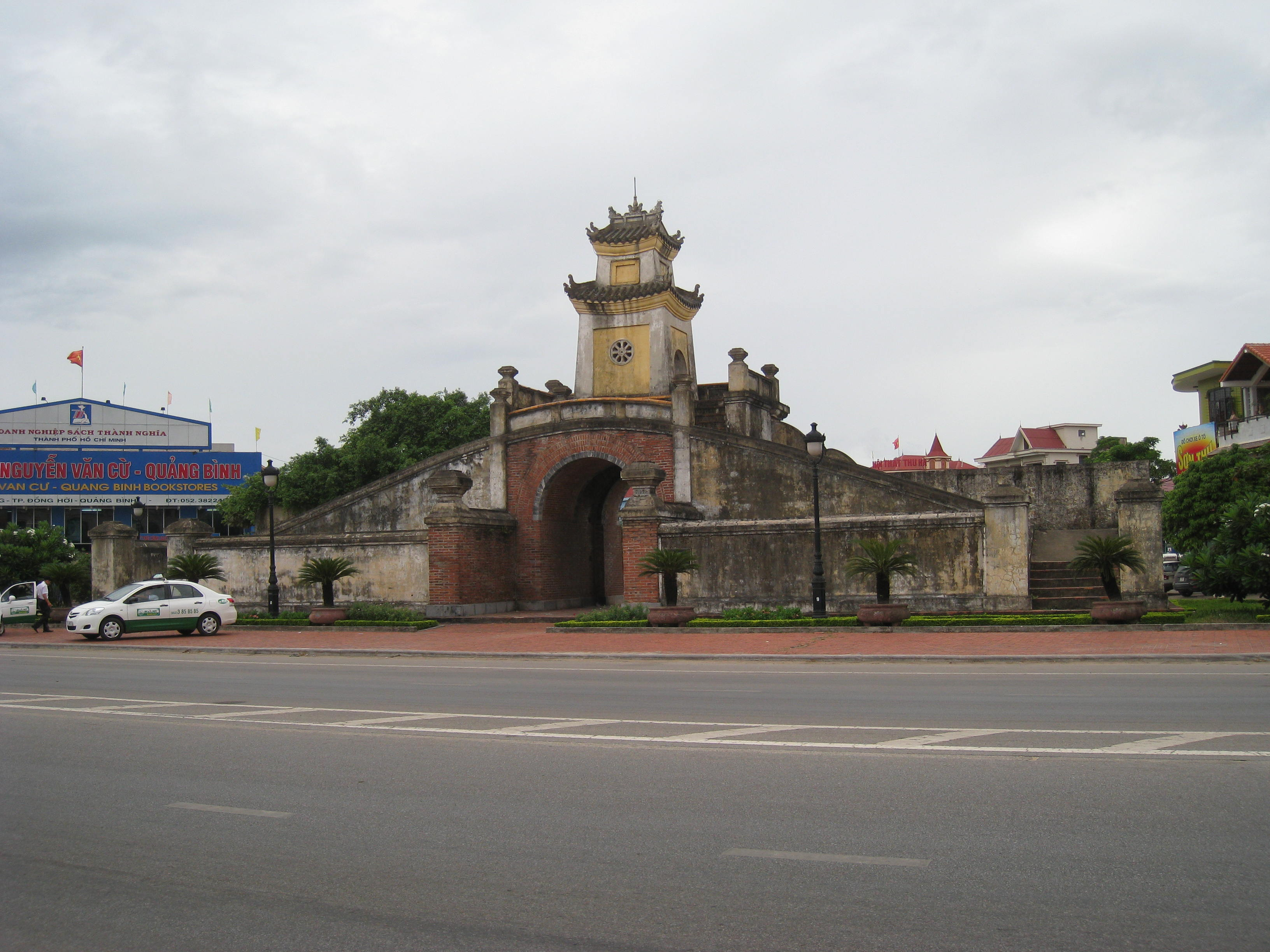
Quảng Bình Citadel Gate, a citadel built during Nguyễn dynasty in Đồng Hới.

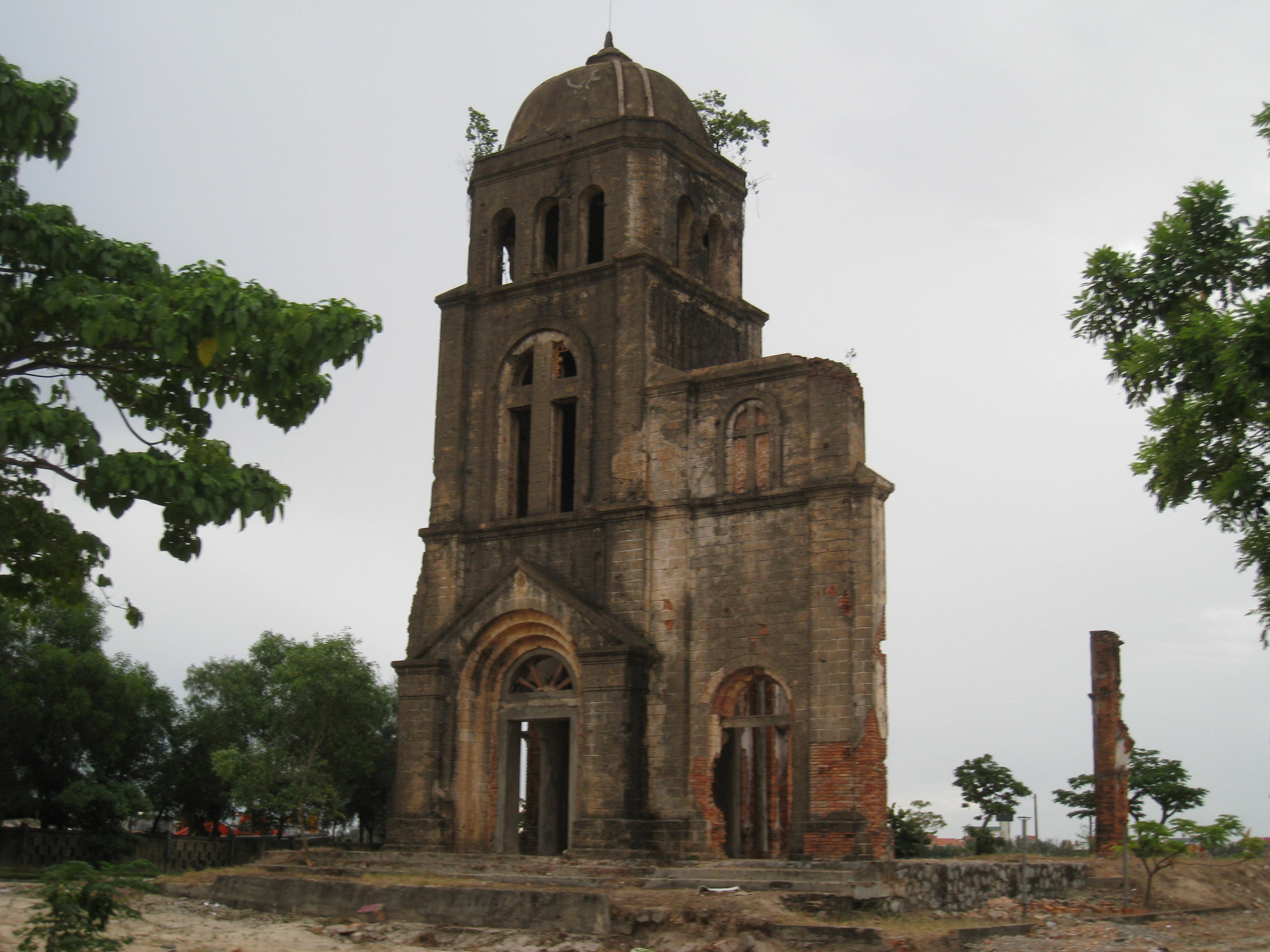
Remains of Tam Toa Church, which was destroyed by US bombardment during Vietnam War in Đồng Hới.

Archaeological excavation in this area proved that human living in what is now Quảng Bình province in Stone Age period. Many artifacts such as ceramic vases, stone tools, china was unearthed in Quảng Bình.

In 1926, a French archaeologist, Madeleine Colani, discovered and excavated many artifacts in caves and grottoes in west mountainous areas of Quảng Bình. She concluded that the Hòa Bình culture belonged to this region. Through C14 dating test, the artifacts dated back to 10,509 (plus or minus 950) years ago. From Quy Đạt township (in Minh Hóa District) to 150 m southwest, the Hum grotto contains many stone tools and animal stones from an ancient human community. Inside the Khai grotto near Quy Đạt township, similar artifacts were also found. Especially, there are several ceramics of Đông Sơn culture. Additionally, artifacts from the Stone Age were unearthed in some grottoes in Quảng Bình. Owners of these artifacts lived in the caves and grottoes and hunted for their food.

Under the Hung kings, when Văn Lang nation founded the Văn Lang tribal coalition, Quảng Bình belonged to the Việt Thường group. Under Lê Trung Hưng, this province was named Tiên Bình. The central and the south of Vietnam (from Ngang mount pass to Bình Thuận province) was part of the Champa Kingdom. During that time, wars between Champa kingdom and Đại Việt were frequent. Majority of the wars were started by Champa Kingdom, who was then, stronger than Đại Việt. Quảng Bình became Đại Việt's territory in 1306 A.D. following the arrange marriage of the Trần Dynasty princess Huyền Trân to the Champa king, Jaya Sinhavarman III (Vietnamese: Chế Mân). Huyen Trần was King Trần Nhân Tông's daughter and King Trần Anh Tông's younger sister. Political matches made to acquire land were common traditional practices by Champa kings. Because of the marriage, Đại Việt acquired lands (as dowry) of what is now Quảng Trị Province, and Thừa Thiên-Huế province (then known respectively as Chau O and Chau Ri or Chau Ly), the new map changed Quảng Bình from being the southernmost land and the southern border of Đại Việt. During the Trinh-Nguyễn family war in the 17th century, the Gianh River in Quảng Bình province became the border between Dang Trong (South Vietnam) and Đàng Ngoài (North Vietnam). Đồng Hới city was built as a fortress to protect the Nguyễn family's Dang Trong from Đàng Ngoài's attacks.

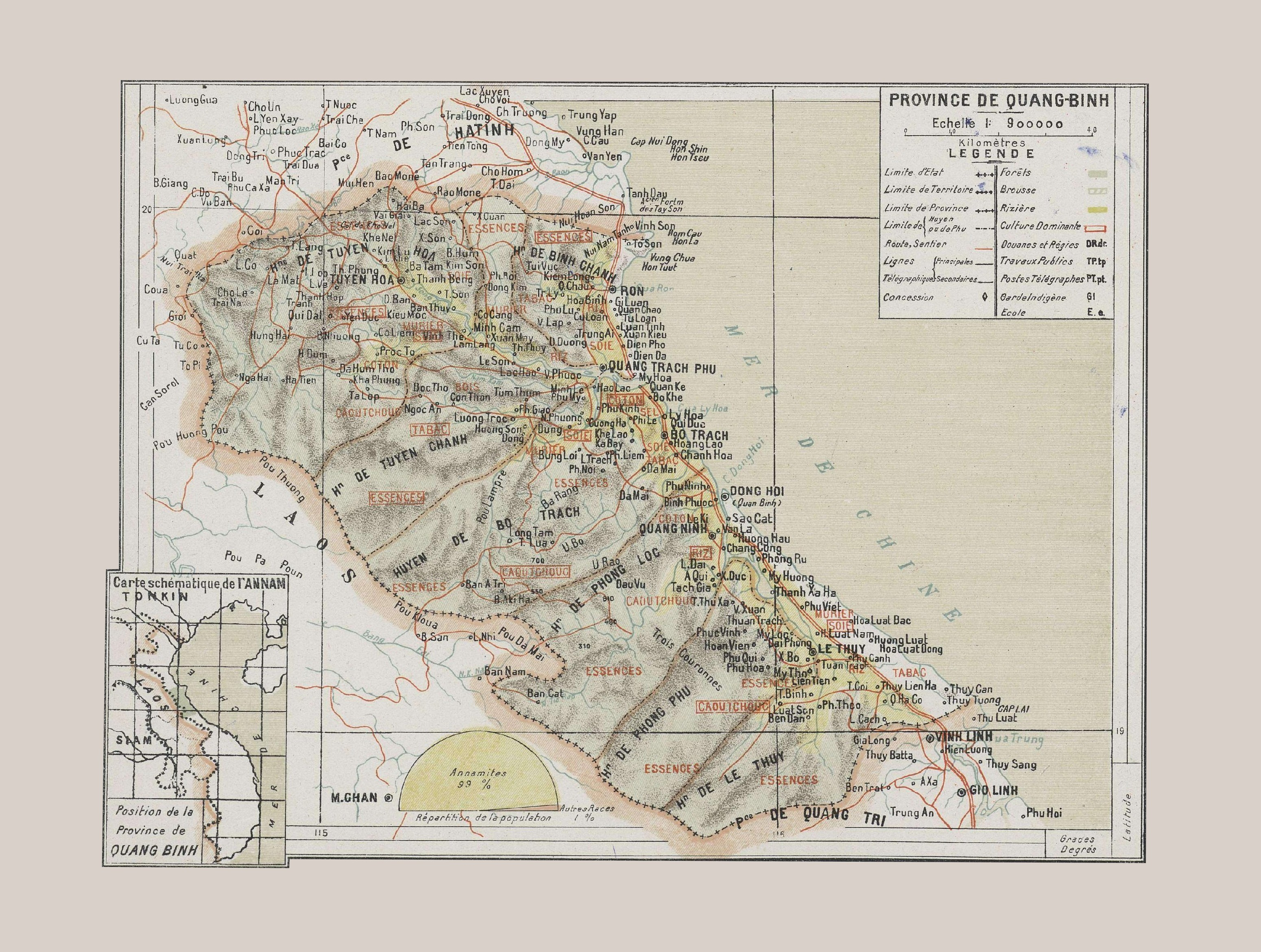
Map of Quang Binh province in 1909

In 1604, the provincial name was changed to Quảng Bình. Lord Nguyễn Phúc Khoát divided Quảng Bình into 3 counties (dinh): dinh Bố Chính (formerly dinh Ngói), dinh Mười (or dinh Lưu Đồn), and dinh Quảng Bình (or dinh Trạm). The province was established in 1831, with the part of phủ Quảng Ninh, then added phủ Quảng Trạch. Under French colony (French Indochina, Quảng Bình was situated in Annam of French Indochina and Đồng Hới airbase in Quảng Bình was used by the French to attack the Việt Minh in north-central Vietnam and the Laotian Pathet army in north and south Laos. In 1954, the Geneva Accord was signed by France, Vietnam, and other parties involved. According to which, Vietnam was to be temporarily divided into 2 parts, with the 17th parallel as the boundary. North Vietnam was under the control of the Communist party while the South was an anti-communist and French collaborators control. A universal election was to be held in 1956 in order to determine the unification of Vietnam. However, in the South, Ngô Đình Diệm held a referendum, which determined the form of government for the South; consequently, leading to the foundation of the Republic of Vietnam.

50 km north of the 17th parallel, during the Vietnam War, Quảng Bình was the most heavily bombed province by U.S. B-52s due to its location. In 1976, Quảng Bình, Quảng Trị province and Thừa Thiên province were merged into Bình Trị Thiên province; in 1990 Binh Tri Thien province was split into three provinces as they were before.

== Notable people ==
- Ngô Đình Diệm (1901-1963), Former President of the Republic of Vietnam
- Đỗ Mậu (1917-2002), Major general of the Army of the Republic of Vietnam
- Pierre Nguyễn Văn Viên (born 1965), Vietnamese Roman Catholic prelate
