= Phong Nha Cave =

Cave in Vietnam

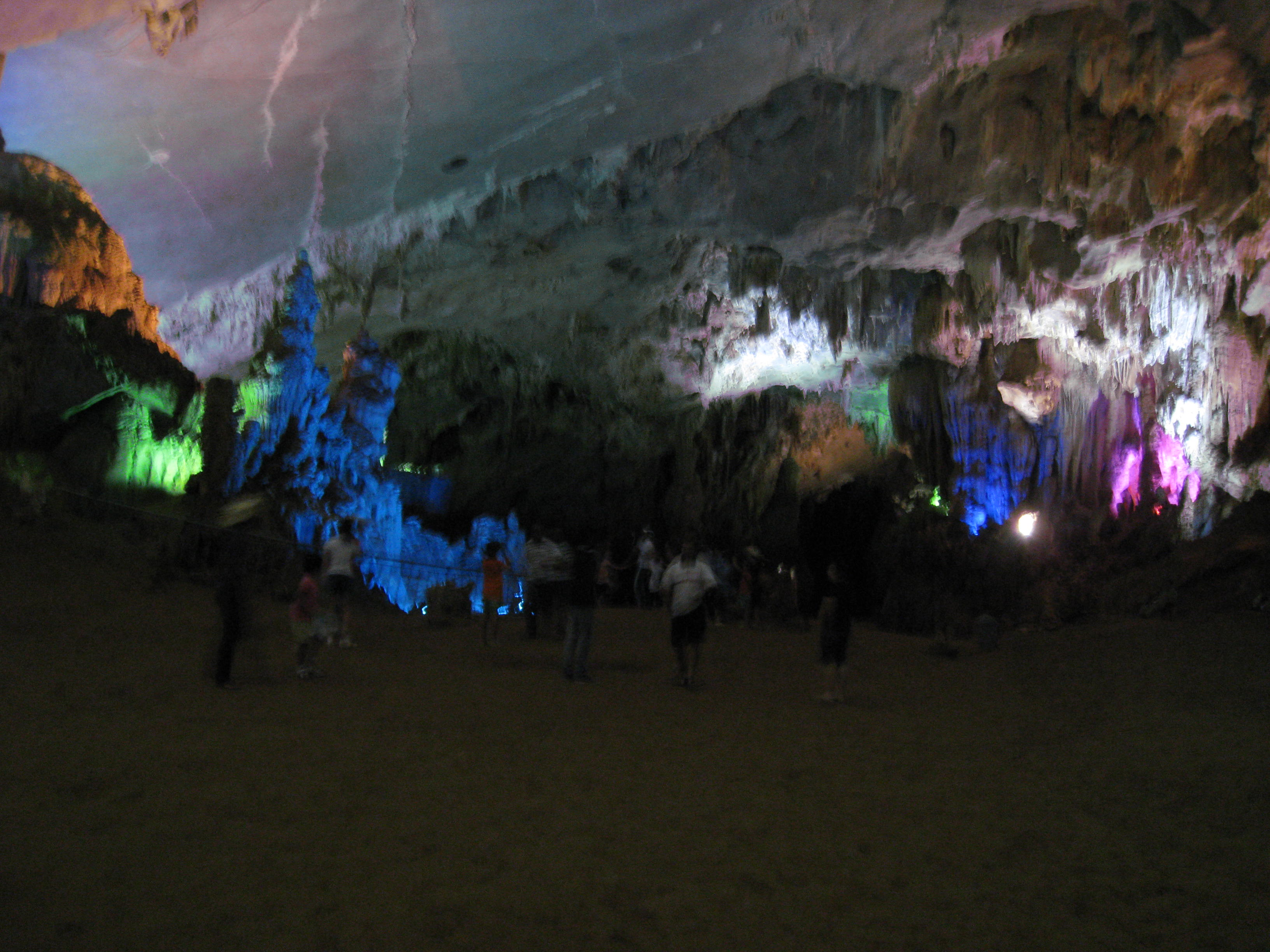
- Phong Nha Cave
- Interactive map of Phong Nha Cave
- Location: Vietnam
- Depth: Unknown
- Length: 7729
- Discovery: unknown
- Entrances: 2 (river opening and ending)
- Difficulty: Dangerous
- Hazards: underground river
- Access: by Son river
- Cave survey: Unknown

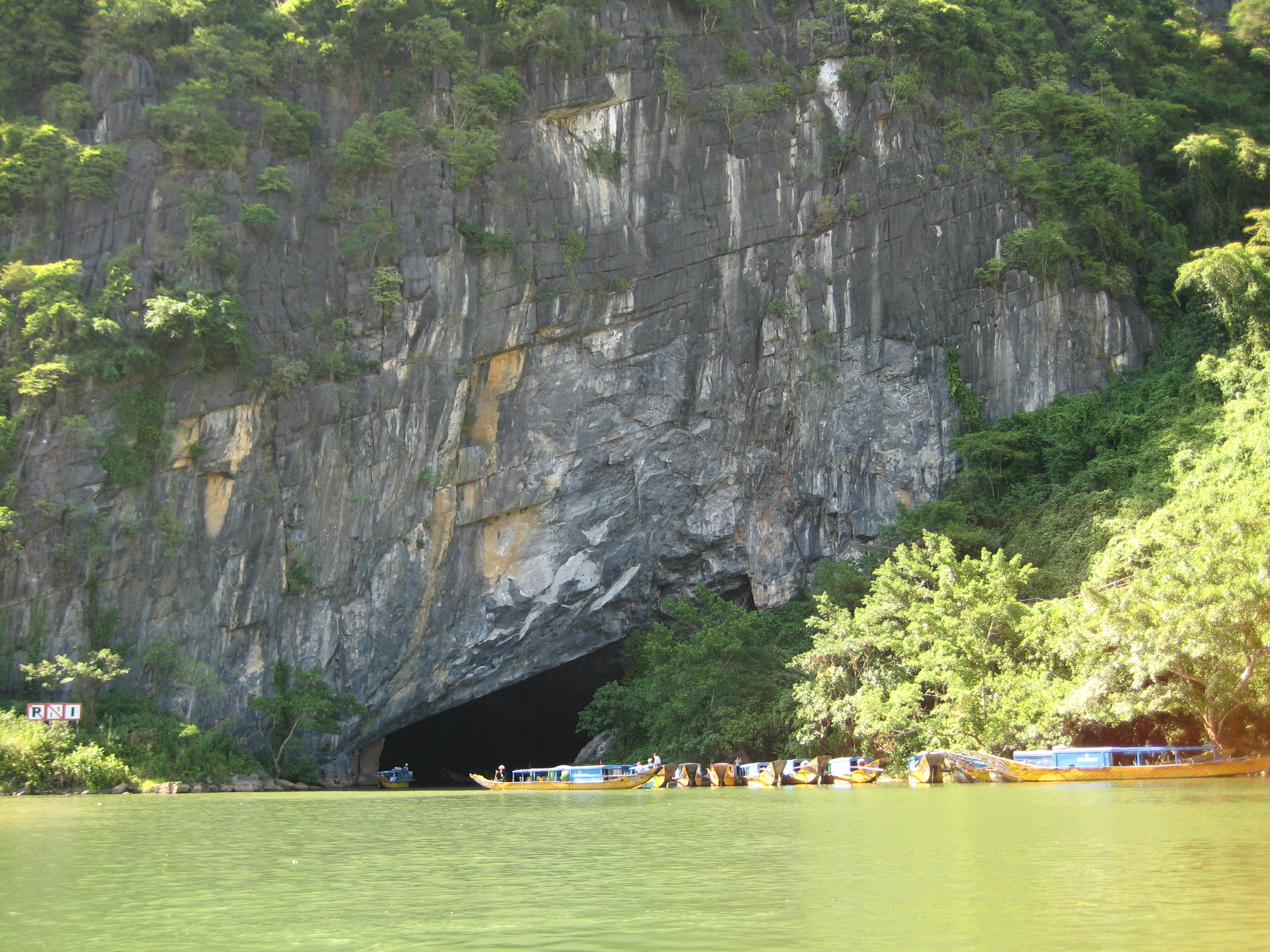
The entry of Phong Nha Cave

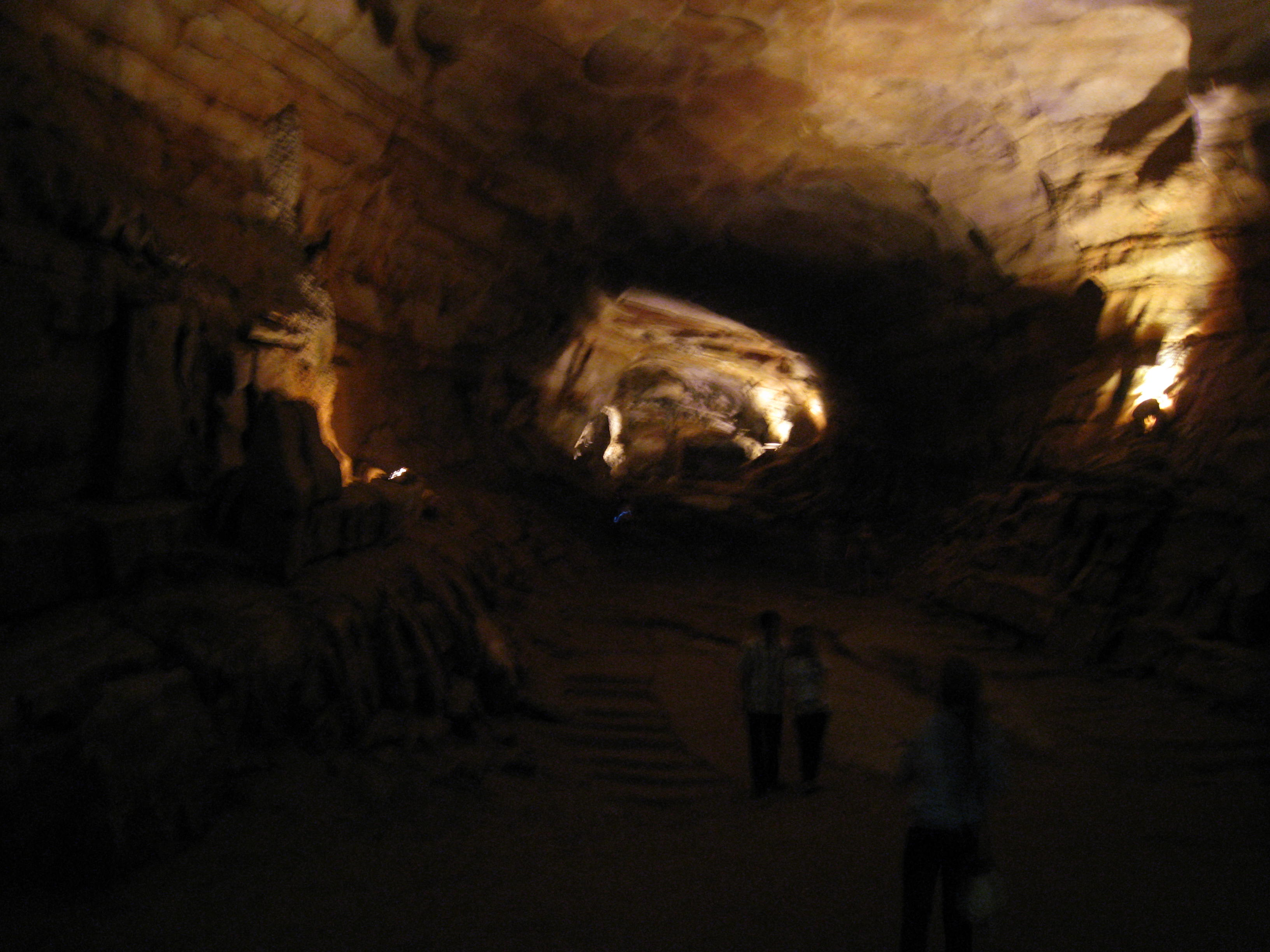
Phong Nha Cave

Phong Nha Cave (Vietnamese: Động Phong Nha, Vietnamese pronunciation: [ɗôŋ͡mˀ fɔ̄ŋ ɲā]) is a cave in Phong Nha-Kẻ Bàng National Park, a UNESCO World Heritage Site in Quảng Trị Province, Vietnam. It is 7,729 meters long and contains 14 grottoes, as well as a 13,969 meter underground river. While scientists have surveyed 44.5 kilometers of passages, tourists are only allowed to explore the first 1500 meters.

== Climate ==
The climate at Phong Nha Cave is cool, sometimes with heavy rain.

== Description ==
The Phong Nha cave, from which the name to the whole system and the park is derived, is famous for its rock formations which have been given names such as the "Lion", the "Fairy Caves", the "Royal Court", and the "Buddha". Phong Nha cave is 7729 meters long but tourists can only penetrate to a distance of 1500 meters, and it contains several grottoes or chambers, including the Bi Ky grottoes.

Its cave system features underground passageways and river caves filled with stalactites and stalagmites. The stalagmites that used to stand at the cave's entrance apparently inspired its name: Phong Nha means "Wind and Teeth". After flowing about 19 km underground, the Son river emerges from the mouth of this cave, draining a huge area of the limestone mountains around Phong Nha.

Phong Nha Cave is recognized by organizations such as the British Cave Research Association for its geographic features, including an underground river, a large underground lake, and its entrance dimensions. The cave system contains extensive dry passages, sandbanks, reefs, and various stalactite and stalagmite formations.

== See also ==
- Hang Sơn Đoòng
- Hang Én
- Hang Pygmy
