= Hang Pygmy =

Cave in Phong Nha, Vietnam

Hang Pygmy (also called Pygmy Cave or Hang En Rục Ca Rông in Vietnamese) is a karst cave in the Phong Nha-Ke Bang National Park, Bố Trạch District, Quảng Bình Province, Vietnam. It is situated deep inside the park, in a remote jungle area. Hang Pygmy has been recognized by the British Cave Research Association as the world’s fourth largest cave, after Hang Sơn Đoòng in the same national park, Deer Cave in Malaysia, and Hang Én. The cave’s entrance is a limestone arch approximately 845 meters across. The height and width of this arch reach around 100 meters.

Access to Hang Pygmy involves a multi-day jungle trek of around 20 kilometers to reach the mouth of the cave. The entrance area contains flat rock shelters that are used as campsites. Exploration tours of Hang Pygmy have been permitted since early 2018. Hang Pygmy has neighboring caves in the same system (such as Hang Over and Kong Collapse).

Hang Pygmy is part of the extensive Hang Hổ (Tiger Cave) system of caves in the park. It consists of large chambers and river passages and features cave formations like stalactites and stalagmites.

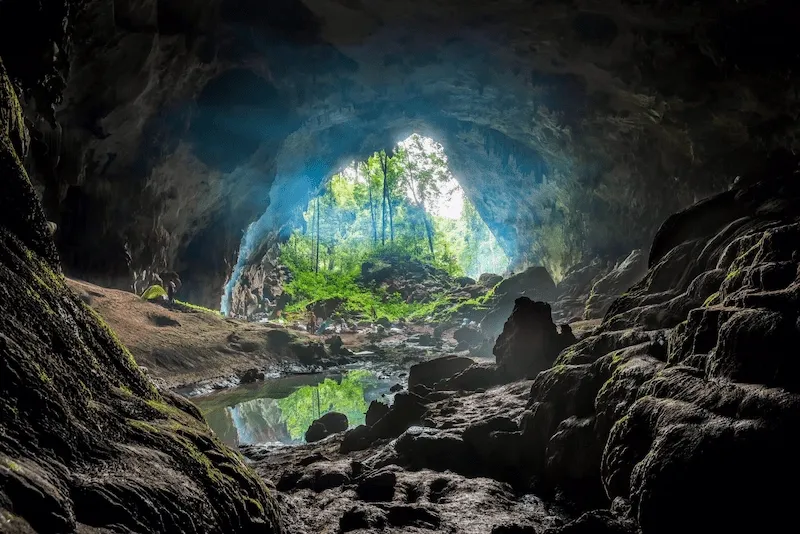
View from inside the Hang Pygmy, showing the entrance of cave with a water pool in the middle
