= Hang Én =

Large cave in Vietnam

- Én cave
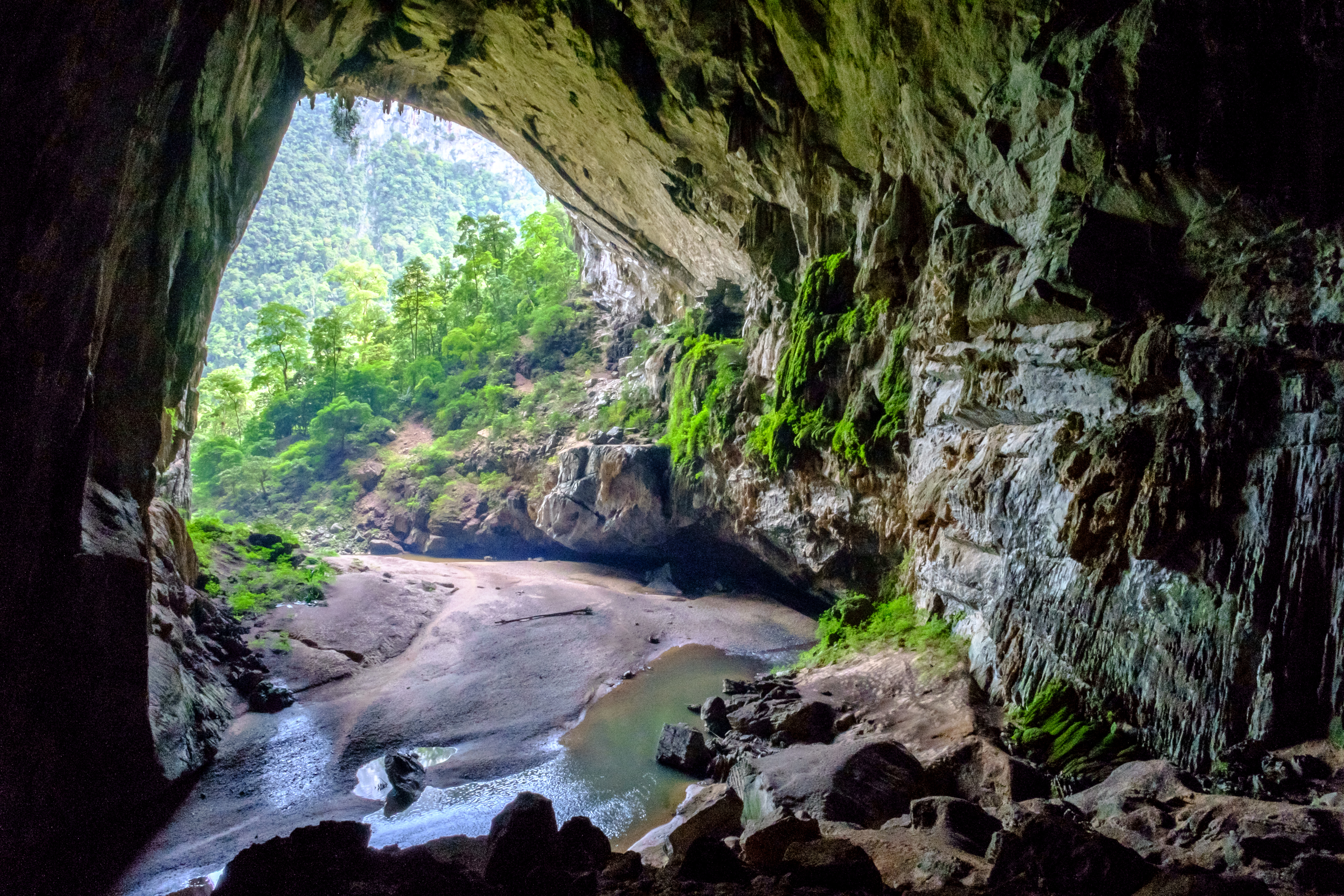
- View from inside the mouth of Hang Én, fairly deep into the cave, above the pool and beach

- Location within Vietnam
- Location: Quảng Trị Province, Vietnam
- Coordinates: 17°27′25″N 106°17′15″E
- Length: Approx. 1,600 m (5,400 ft)
- Discovery: Known for centuries
- Geology: Limestone
- Entrances: 3
- Hazards: Underground river
- Cave survey: 1990s, British/Vietnamese
- Height: Max. approx. 100 m (330 ft)
- Width: Max. approx. 170 m (560 ft)

Hang Én ('swift cave' in Vietnamese, named for the birds that nest in it), occasionally referred to as Én cave in English, is a cave in Phong Nha-Ke Bang National Park, a UNESCO World Heritage Site. Én is the third largest cave in the world, after Hang Sơn Đoòng in the same national park, and Deer Cave in Malaysia. The cave has its own jungle, waters, beach, and climate. There are three known entrances to Hang Én.

The cave, which goes through a mountain for 1,645 metres (5,397 ft), has a maximum height around 100 metres (330 ft), and a maximum width of approximately 170 metres (560 ft) is a feeder to Hang Sơn Đoòng, 2 kilometres (1.2 mi) away. The only ways to reach the cave are by helicopter, or an approximately four-hour jungle trek from the nearest road.

Both Én and Sơn Đoòng were featured in footage aired on the television program Good Morning America in May 2015, dubbed one of "the top 10 cultural events of the year" in Vietnam by Viet Nam News. Hang Én was selected by the US-based Warner Bros. as a shooting location for the 2015 film Pan.
