= Trường Xuân =

Trường Xuân may refer to several places in Vietnam, including:

- Trường Xuân, Quảng Nam, a ward of Tam Kỳ.
- Trường Xuân, Cần Thơ, a rural commune of Thới Lai District.
- Trường Xuân, Đắk Nông, a rural commune of Đăk Song District.
- Trường Xuân, Đồng Tháp, a rural commune of Đồng Tháp province.
- Trường Xuân, Quảng Bình, a rural commune of Quảng Ninh District.
- Trường Xuân, Thanh Hóa, a rural commune of Thọ Xuân District.

== See also ==
- Trường Xuân A, a rural commune of Thới Lai District, Cần Thơ
- Trường Xuân B, a rural commune of Thới Lai District, Cần Thơ
- Changchun (Vietnamese: Trường Xuân)
