= Van Ninh (disambiguation) =

Vạn Ninh may refer to several places in Vietnam, including:

- Vạn Ninh, a commune of Khánh Hòa province
- Vạn Ninh district, a former rural district of Khánh Hòa province
- Vạn Ninh, Quảng Ninh, a former rural commune of Móng Cái
- Vạn Ninh, Bắc Ninh, a former rural commune of Gia Bình district
- Vạn Ninh, Quảng Bình, a former rural commune of Quảng Ninh district
