= Quảng Ninh (disambiguation) =

Quảng Ninh is a centrally-governed city in Vietnam. It could also be one of the following locations in Vietnam:

- Quảng Ninh: commune in Quảng Trị province.
- Quảng Ninh: commune in Thanh Hóa province
- Quảng Ninh: former district of Quảng Bình province (today part of Quảng Trị province).
