= Vĩnh Ninh =

Vĩnh Ninh may refer to several places in Vietnam, including:

- Vĩnh Ninh, Huế, a ward of Huế.
- Vĩnh Ninh, Quảng Bình, a rural commune of Quảng Ninh District.
- Vĩnh Ninh, Vĩnh Tường, a rural commune of Vĩnh Tường District.
