= Hàm Ninh =

Hàm Ninh may refer to several places in Vietnam, including:

- Hàm Ninh, Kiên Giang, a rural commune of Phú Quốc
- Hàm Ninh, Quảng Bình, a rural commune of Quảng Ninh District
