= Xuân Ninh =

Xuân Ninh may refer to several places in Vietnam, including:

- Xuân Ninh, Quảng Bình, a rural commune of Quảng Ninh District.
- Xuân Ninh, Nam Định, a rural commune of Xuân Trường District.
