= Hiền Ninh =

Hiền Ninh may refer to several places in Vietnam, including:

- Hiền Ninh, Hanoi, a rural commune of Sóc Sơn District.
- Hiền Ninh, Quảng Bình, a rural commune of Quảng Ninh District.
