= Việt Bắc =

Former region of Vietnam

Việt Bắc (lit. 'Viet the North') is a region of Vietnam north of Hanoi that served as the Việt Minh's base of support during the First Indochina War (1946–1954). It was also the location of the headquarters of the Communist Party and the Việt Minh government during this period.

== Administrative divisions ==
The Việt Bắc Interzone (Liên khu Việt Bắc) was an administrative region consisting of 17 provinces: Cao Bằng, Bắc Kạn, Lạng Sơn, Thái Nguyên, Hà Giang, Tuyên Quang, Lào Cai, Yên Bái, Sơn La, Lai Châu, Bắc Giang, Bắc Ninh, Phúc Yên, Vĩnh Yên, Phú Thọ, Quảng Yên, Hải Ninh, Hồng Gai Special Zone and Mai Đà District of Hòa Bình. The center of the region was Tuyên Quang.

The administrative of Việt Bắc is called by Administrative Committee of Interregional. It includes Viet bac Interregional is a level of administrative and Military (High command). It was established under the Decree No 127SL of President of the Democratic Republic of Vietnam on 4 November 1949, beyond the merger of Interregions No. 1 and No. 10.

== History ==
From 1949 to 1954, Senior Lieutenant-general Chu Văn Tấn was the chief of Interregional, secretary zone party committee, Tribunal president of Military court, president of administrative committee of Viet Bac. From 1954 to the end of 1956, he was in charged Commander, Political Commissar holding currently and Secretary of Interregional of Viet Bac. When the Tây Bắc (North West Area) just have liberated. Tay Bac Zone was established beyond the Decree No 13-SL of Prime Ministor on 28 January 1953, including 4 provinces : Lai Châu, Lào Cai, Yên Bái and Sơn La just have detach from Viet Bac Interregional. On 1 July 1956, self-governing Viet Bac was established have put an end to Viet Bac Interregional with the role of administrative unit. However, in June 1957, Viet Bac Interregional was replaced by Viet Bac Military Zone. Initially, self-governing Viet Bac includes 5 provinces: Cao Bằng, Bắc Cạn, Lạng Sơn, Tuyên Quang, Thái Nguyên and adding Hà Giang Province later. Viet Bac and self-governing Tay Bac together is the region with many ethnic minority living and have the special policy for development in these area.

== See also ==
- Northeast (Vietnam)
