= Kim Quy =

Vietnamese mythical golden turtle god

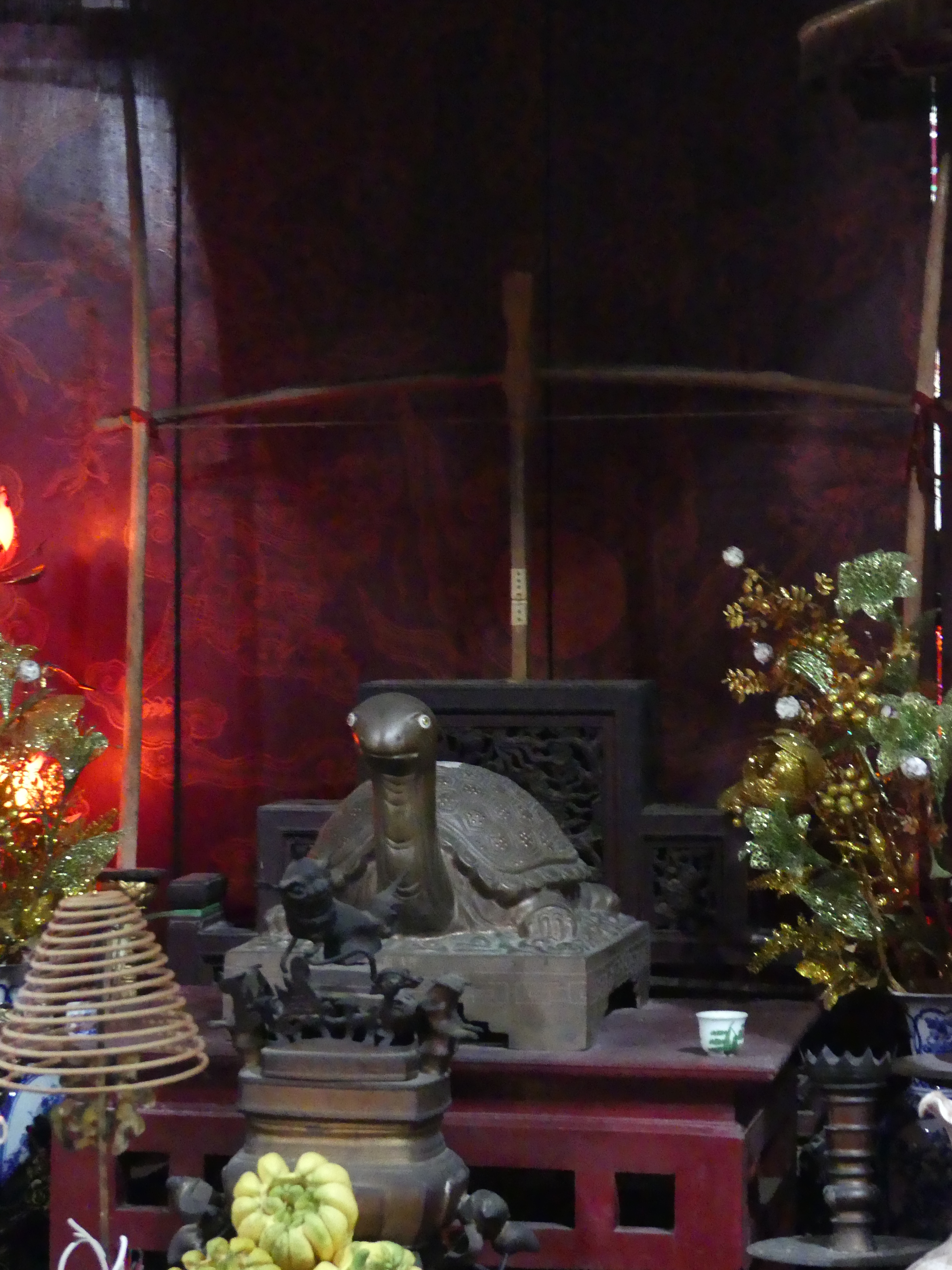
Thanh Giang sứ giả statue at An Dương Vương Temple

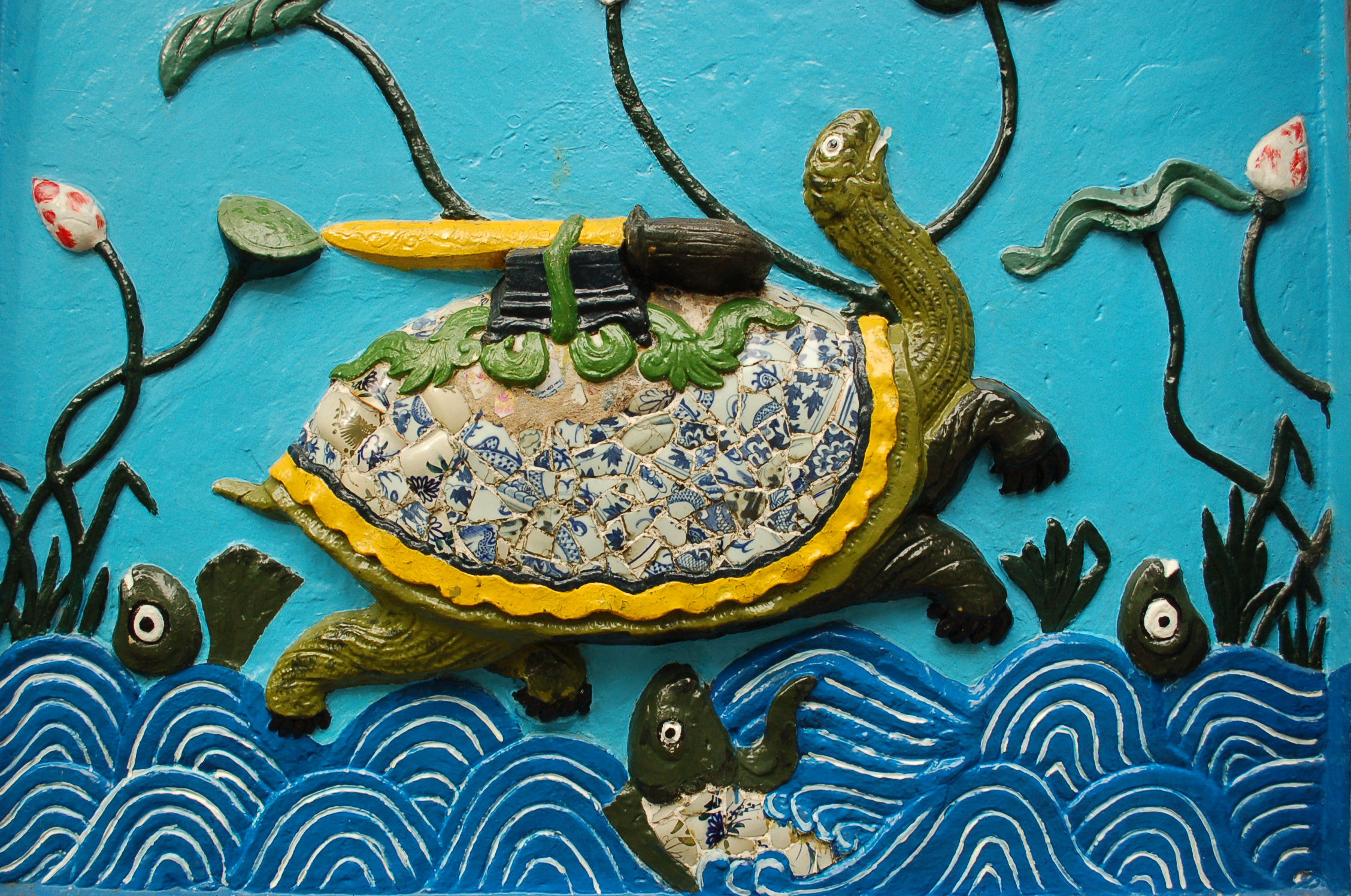
A depiction of the legend of the Kim Qui and the Restored Sword (Hoan Kiem), on mural ceramics in Hoan Kiem temple

Kim Quy (Chữ Hán: 金龜) (“Gold Turtle”, also spelled Kim Qui) or Thanh Giang sứ giả (Chữ Hán: 清江使者) is a mythical golden turtle god appearing in several Vietnamese legends.

In one legend, he appears to the early Vietnamese ruler An Dương Vương (d. 179 BC) and gives him one of his golden claws as a trigger for a magical crossbow with which An Dương Vương can kill 300 enemies with one shot. With it he is able to protect the kingdom. Later on, however, An Dương Vương's daughter marries his enemy's son and betrays the secret of the crossbow. Her husband secretly switches the trigger so that the crossbow no longer has any magical powers, and when his father attacks, An Dương Vương is forced to flee with his daughter. He flees far to the south, but always feels the enemy is right at his back. Kim Quy appears to him and tells him that his own daughter, riding on the horse behind him, is his enemy. An Dương Vương executes his daughter for her betrayal before drowning himself in the ocean.

In another legend, Kim Quy appears to the Vietnamese emperor Lê Lợi (r.1428–1435) in The Green Water Lake in what is now Hanoi. Lê Lợi had led the Lam Sơn uprising against the Ming Dynasty, who had occupied Vietnam. According to the legend, the Dragon King (Long Vương), a local god, had aided Lê with a magical sword, Heavens’ Will (Thuận Thiên), with which Lê was able to drive out the Chinese and establish the Later Lê dynasty. After his victory, Kim Quy appeared to Lê from out of the lake to take back the sword for the Dragon King. The emperor hands over the sword and Kim Quy disappears into the lake, which has ever since been called The Lake of the Returned Sword (Hoàn Kiếm Lake). The lake was, until very recently, home to the Hoan Kiem turtle, but the last one died in late 2015 or early 2016. The Turtle Tower on an island in the lake, commemorates the legend.
