= Hà Đình Đức =

Vietnamese biologist (1940–2026)

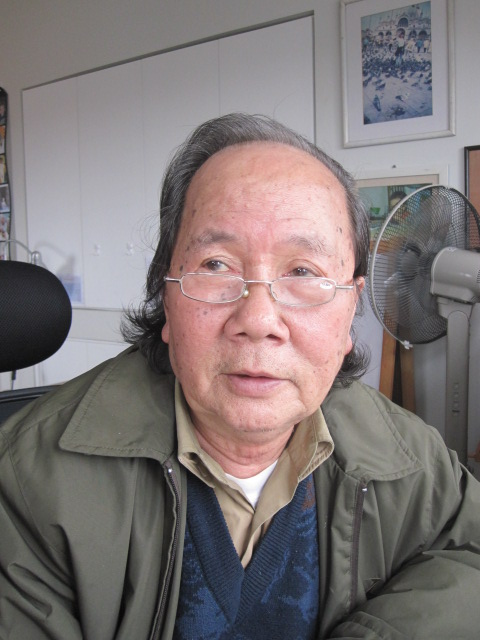
- Hà Đình Đức in 2012
- Born: 23 March 1940; Thọ Xuân District, Annam, French Indochina
- Died: 7 August 2026 (aged 86); Hanoi, Vietnam
- Education: Hanoi National University
- Known for: Hoan Kiem turtle, conservation

Hà Đình Đức (23 March 1940 – 7 August 2026) was a Vietnamese biologist. He was born in the Thọ Xuân District, now in Thanh Hóa Province, Vietnam. He was known for describing the Hoan Kiem turtle, which he classified under name Rafetus leloii. Duc believed it is distinct from the Yangtze giant softshell turtle, which is generally regarded by other biologists as the same species. He had also been at odds with other conservationists and officials who believe the turtle should remain in the Hoan Kiem lake, while he believed it should be removed to avoid competing with other invasive turtle species of the lake. Additionally, Ha believed there is only one Hoan Kiem turtle living in the lake, even though witnesses have reported at least one other turtle in the lake. Ha died on 7 August 2026, at the age of 86.
