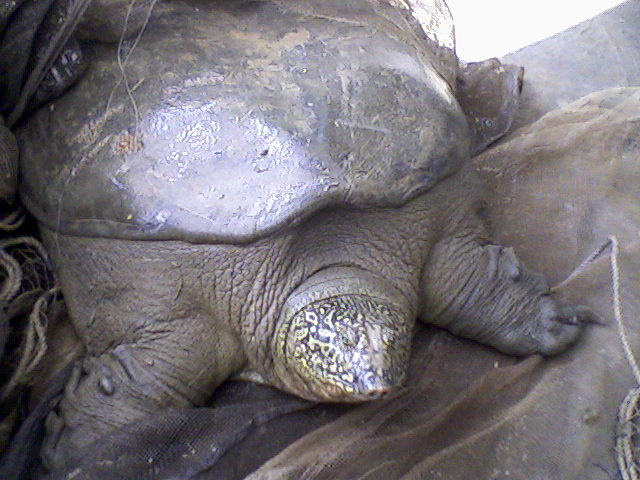
- One of the two R. swinhoei of Dong Mo, Son Tay, Vietnam

Conservation status
- Critically Endangered (IUCN 3.1)
- CITES Appendix II

Scientific classification
- Kingdom: Animalia
- Phylum: Chordata
- Class: Reptilia
- Order: Testudines
- Suborder: Cryptodira
- Family: Trionychidae
- Genus: Rafetus
- Species: R. swinhoei

Binomial name
- Rafetus swinhoei (Gray, 1873)
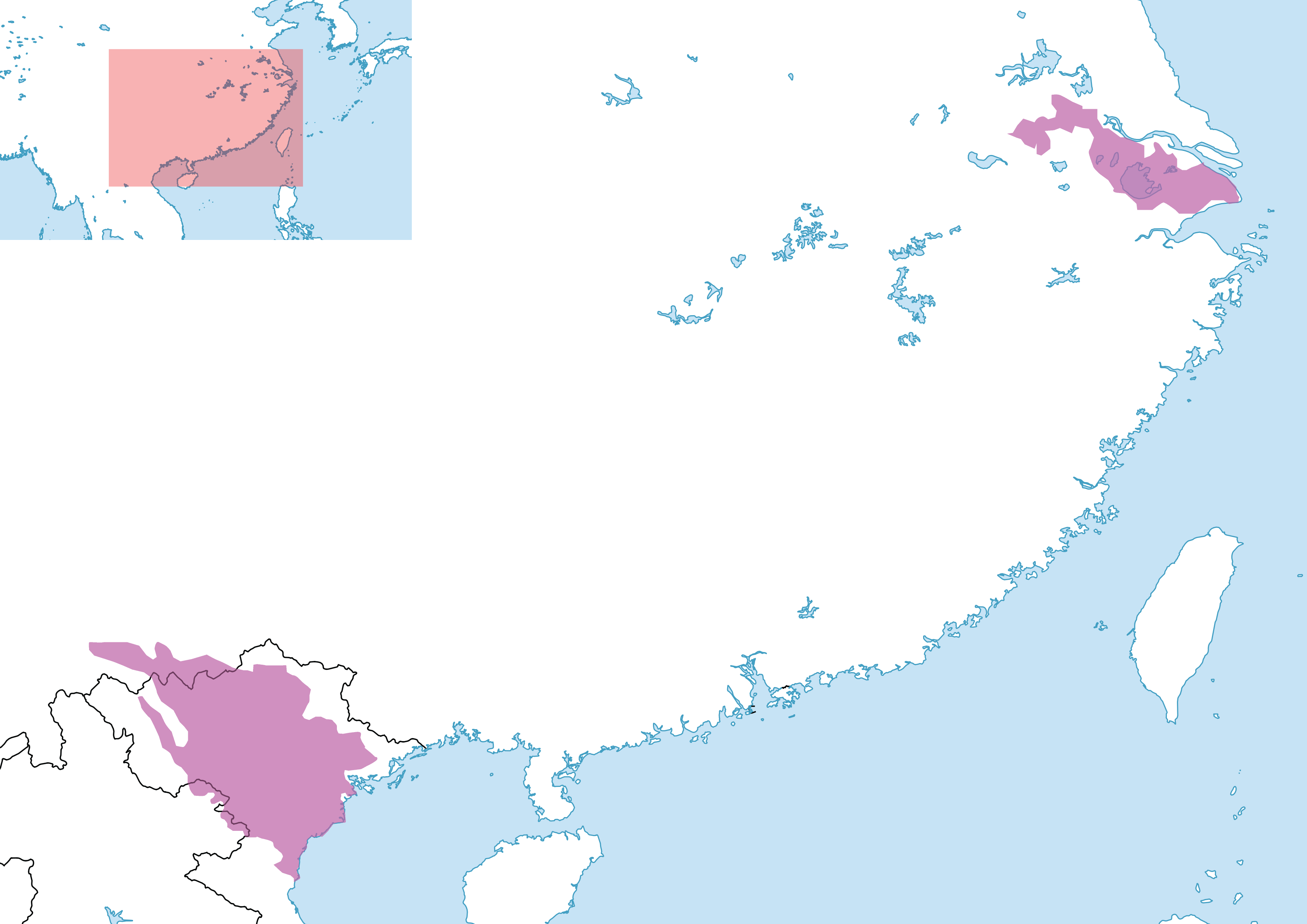
- Yangtze giant softshell turtle range

Synonyms
- List: Oscaria swinhoei Gray, 1873; Yuen elegans Heude, 1880; Yuen leprosus Heude, 1880; Yuen maculatus Heude, 1880; Yuen pallens Heude, 1880; Yuen viridis Heude, 1880; Trionyx swinhonis Boulenger, 1889; Pelodiscus swinhoei — Baur, 1893; Trionyx swinhoei — Siebenrock, 1902; Amyda swinhoei — Mertens, L. Müller & Rust, 1934; Pelochelys taihuensis Zhang, 1984; Trionyx liupani Tao, 1986; Rafetus swinhoei — Meylan, 1987; Pelochelys maculatus — Zhao, 1997; Pelochlys maculatus — Zhao, 1997; Rafetus leloii Hà Dình Dúc, 2000 (nomen nudum); Rafetus hoankiemensis Devaux, 2001 (nomen nudum)

= Yangtze giant softshell turtle =

Endangered species of turtle

The Yangtze giant softshell turtle (Rafetus swinhoei), also commonly known as the Red River giant softshell turtle, the Shanghai softshell turtle, the speckled softshell turtle, and Swinhoe's softshell turtle, is a critically endangered species of turtle in the family Trionychidae. It is one of the largest living freshwater turtle species. Native to eastern and southern China and northern Vietnam, the species has a known population of only two individuals, and the absence of fertile females has rendered it functionally extinct, with only three known turtles left.

== Description ==
The Yangtze giant softshell turtle is recognized for its deep head, pig-like snout, and dorsally positioned eyes. As a critically endangered species, it is widely regarded as the largest freshwater turtle in the world. Although comparisons are limited due to the small number of known specimens, its average and maximum sizes surpass those of other large freshwater turtles, such as the alligator snapping turtle and related giant softshell species, including other Rafetus and Pelochelys species.

Adult specimens exceed 100 cm (39 in) in length and 70 cm (28 in) in width, with weights ranging from 70–100 kg (150–220 lb). A study of large turtles from the Yangtze River reported an average weight of 25 kg (55 lb), although not all specimens were definitively identified as Rafetus.

The turtle’s carapace (shell) typically measures over 50 cm (20 in), with the largest recorded at 86 cm (34 in) in straight length. Curved carapace lengths of up to 106 cm (42 in) have also been reported. Exceptional specimens, primarily from Vietnam, are believed to have weighed between 220 to 247.5 kg (485 to 546 lb). The head measures over 20 cm (7.9 in) in length and 10 cm (3.9 in) in width.

Sexual dimorphism is present, with males generally smaller than females but possessing longer, more prominent tails.

== Geographic range ==
The Yangtze giant softshell turtle historically inhabited the Yangtze River and Lake Tai, located on the border of Jiangsu and Zhejiang provinces in eastern China, as well as areas near the Red River in southern China and northern Vietnam, including Gejiu, Yuanyang, Jianshui, and Honghe in Yunnan Province. The last records from the Yangtze region date to the 1930s. The Red River population was well documented from the 1960s to the 1990s, declining sharply after this date.

Two specimens captured from Gejiu in the 1970s were kept at the Beijing Zoo and the Shanghai Zoo but died in 2005 and 2006, respectively.

In Vietnam, the species has been observed in Hoan Kiem Lake in Hanoi on several occasions, including documented sightings in 1999, 2000, and 2005. A male turtle was captured from the lake in April 2011 and treated for open sores potentially caused by pollution, injuries from fishing hooks, or other turtles. It was found dead in January 2016.

Another individual of unknown sex was identified through environmental DNA collected at Xuan Khanh Lake, near Hanoi, on 11 April 2018. A female turtle was captured in Dong Mo Lake, west of Hanoi, in October 2020, but it died in April 2023.

== Ecology and behaviour ==
=== Diet ===
The Yangtze giant softshell turtle primarily feeds on a diet of fish, crabs, snails, frogs, and aquatic vegetation such as water hyacinths and "green rice leaves."

=== Reproduction ===
The species typically lays between 20 and 80 eggs per clutch, with nesting occurring at night or during the early morning.

In an attempt to prevent extinction, a fertile female from the Changsha Zoo was transferred to the Suzhou Zoo in 2008 to breed with the only known male in captivity, a 100-year-old individual. The move, coordinated by the Wildlife Conservation Society and the Turtle Survival Alliance, involved transporting the female over 1,000 km (600 miles). Despite this effort, breeding attempts have largely failed. By 2013, six breeding seasons had produced 80 eggs, none of which were viable.

Artificial insemination was first attempted in 2015. While the process successfully fertilized a female, the eggs laid during two clutches were not viable. This female died in April 2019 after a subsequent insemination attempt.

=== Behaviour ===
Despite its large size and distinctive appearance, the Yangtze giant softshell turtle is highly elusive. It spends most of its time submerged in deep water and surfaces only briefly to breathe, which complicates efforts to observe or identify wild individuals. A study that interviewed former hunters of the species indicates that Yangtze giant softshell turtles had yearly activity cycles similar to that of temperature-zone reptiles, with a prolonged period of winter inactivity and with summertime nesting.

== Relationship with humans ==
=== Scientific description and systematics ===
The Yangtze giant softshell turtle was first described in 1873 by John Edward Gray, a turtle expert at the British Museum, who named it Oscaria swinhoei after English biologist Robert Swinhoe, who had sent a specimen from Shanghai. Gray described the species as "the most beautiful species of Trionychidae that has yet occurred."

In 1880, Pierre Marie Heude, a Shanghai-based Jesuit missionary, obtained multiple specimens of the species from the Huangpu River and Lake Tai. Believing the specimens exhibited significant variation, he described them as five distinct species: Yuen leprosus, Yuen maculatus, Yuen elegans, Yuen viridis, and Yuen pallens. The genus name Yuen derives from the Chinese 鼋 (yuan), meaning "large turtle." Later, zoologists reclassified the species under different genera, including Trionyx, Pelodiscus, and Pelochelys. In 1987, Peter Andre Meylan placed the species under the genus Rafetus.

The taxonomic status of the closely related Hoan Kiem turtle (Rafetus leloii) remains controversial. While most herpetologists consider R. leloii a junior synonym of Rafetus swinhoei, some Vietnamese biologists, such as Ha Dinh Duc and Le Tran Binh, argue that it is a distinct species based on genetic and morphological differences. Critics, including Farkas et al., have attributed these differences to age-related variation and noted that the genetic data used by Le et al. were not submitted to GenBank. They also criticized the violation of ICZN Code rules when renaming R. leloii as R. vietnamensis.

=== Key threats ===
The Yangtze giant softshell turtle faces numerous threats that have contributed to its critically endangered status. Habitat loss due to urbanization, pollution, and dam construction has drastically reduced its natural range. Illegal wildlife trade and a lack of robust legislation to regulate hunting and trafficking have further compounded the species' decline.

The species has also suffered from overexploitation, as turtles are hunted for food, subsistence, and local consumption. Additionally, their carapaces and bones are used in traditional medicine, and their skulls are sometimes kept as trophies. Data suggests that the population collapse of these turtles in Vietnam occurred in two phases: first in the 1980s when the population size declined dramatically, and the second at the beginning of the 1990s, when hunters were collecting multiple individuals from populations that were already severely impacted. There is agreement among former hunters that the turtles started becoming very rare after 1991 and 1992.

A recent plan to construct a series of 12 hydropower dams along the Red River in China poses a significant risk, as it would flood critical habitats and alter the ecosystem downstream in Vietnam.

=== Conservation efforts ===
External image
- One individual in Suzhou Zoo, 2008.

==== Captive breeding ====
Conservationists have focused on captive breeding as a primary strategy to save the Yangtze giant softshell turtle. In 2008, the last known fertile female, housed at the Changsha Zoo, was transferred to the Suzhou Zoo to breed with the sole known male in captivity. Despite six breeding seasons and numerous eggs laid, no viable offspring were produced.

In 2015, artificial insemination was attempted for the first time. Although the procedure successfully fertilized eggs, none hatched. The female died in April 2019 after another artificial insemination attempt.

To improve future breeding outcomes, conservationists have focused on better habitat conditions and dietary adjustments to increase calcium levels, which are believed to influence egg viability.

In parallel with captive breeding, efforts to locate wild individuals have intensified. Surveys in Vietnam's Dong Mo and Xuan Khanh Lakes have identified potential survivors, though their numbers remain critically low. Conservationists continue to explore other areas, such as the Red River in Yunnan Province, for remaining specimens.

==== Surveys for surviving specimens ====
Conservationists have undertaken extensive efforts to locate wild Yangtze giant softshell turtles in the remote regions of China and Vietnam. Key areas of focus include parts of the Red River in Yunnan Province, where locals have reported sightings of large softshell turtles that match the species' description. However, these reports remain unconfirmed despite intensive surveys.

In 2018, DNA analysis of water samples from Xuan Khanh Lake verified the presence of Rafetus swinhoei, confirming a second wild individual. Previously, this turtle had been photographed in 2012 and 2017, but the images were too blurry to provide conclusive identification. The species' decline has been marked by significant losses in recent years. A wild individual in Vietnam was reported dead in January 2016, and the last captive female at the Suzhou Zoo in China died in April 2019 following an artificial insemination attempt.

In October 2020, a wild female was discovered in Dong Mo Lake in Vietnam, giving conservationists renewed hope. Researchers also hoped to find a potential second wild individual in Dong Mo Lake.

In early 2023, the same female individual was found dead, further diminishing the species' chances of survival. Currently, the known surviving turtles are thought to include one at the Suzhou Zoo and potentially one in the nearby Xuan Khanh Lake.

In addition to these verified sightings, local fishermen in Yunnan Province have reported observing large softshell turtles in reservoirs created by the Madushan Dam. However, extensive surveys conducted in 2016 and 2017 failed to locate any surviving individuals in these areas.

Other anecdotal reports suggest that a Rafetus swinhoei lived in a pond in Laos for over 45 years but disappeared after a monsoon in 2013. While promising, these accounts have yet to be substantiated.

== The legend of Kim Qui ==
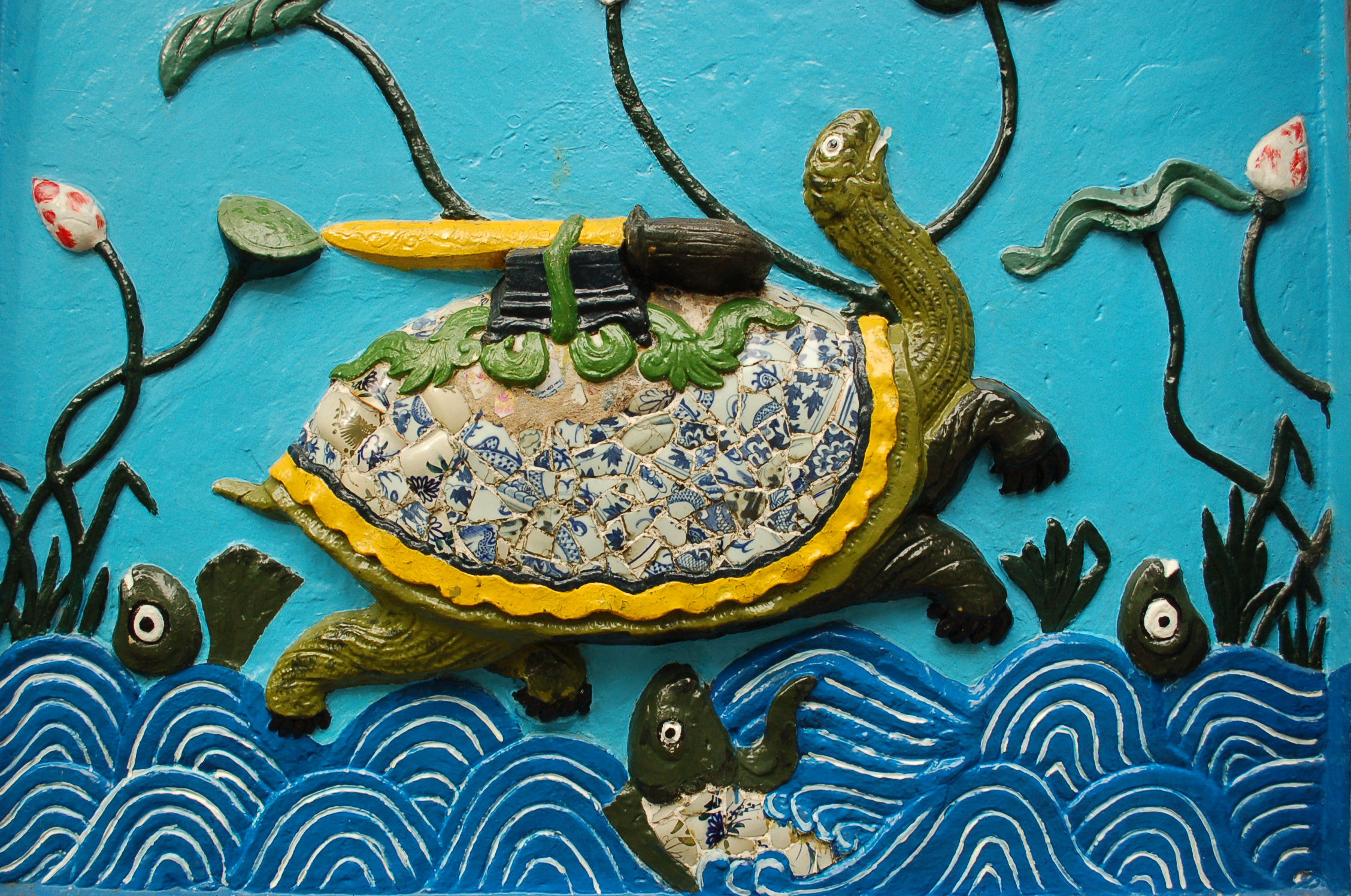
Depiction of Kim Qui receiving the Heaven's Will sword (Hoan Kiem).

The Yangtze giant softshell turtle has deep cultural significance in Vietnamese folklore, where it is associated with the legendary figure Kim Qui, or the Golden Turtle God (金龜). Kim Qui is said to have appeared at pivotal moments in Vietnam's history, offering guidance and assistance to its rulers.

During the reign of An Dương Vương (257–207 BCE), Kim Qui reportedly aided the king in constructing defenses for the ancient capital of Co Loa. According to legend, the Golden Turtle provided the king with a magical crossbow capable of firing arrows en masse to repel invaders. When An Dương Vương’s daughter betrayed him, Kim Qui warned the king of her treachery, leading to her execution and the king’s eventual suicide.

In the 15th century, Kim Qui is said to have appeared to Lê Lợi, a Vietnamese nobleman and later emperor. Lê Lợi received the magical sword Heaven's Will from a fisherman and used it to lead a rebellion against the Chinese occupation. After defeating the invaders and establishing the Lê dynasty, Lê Lợi returned the sword to Kim Qui at Hoan Kiem Lake ("Lake of the Returned Sword"). According to legend, the Golden Turtle surfaced to claim the sword, catching it in its jaws before disappearing into the depths of the lake.

This legend has cemented the Yangtze giant softshell turtle as a symbol of resilience and cultural heritage in Vietnam, linking it to themes of national unity and divine intervention.
