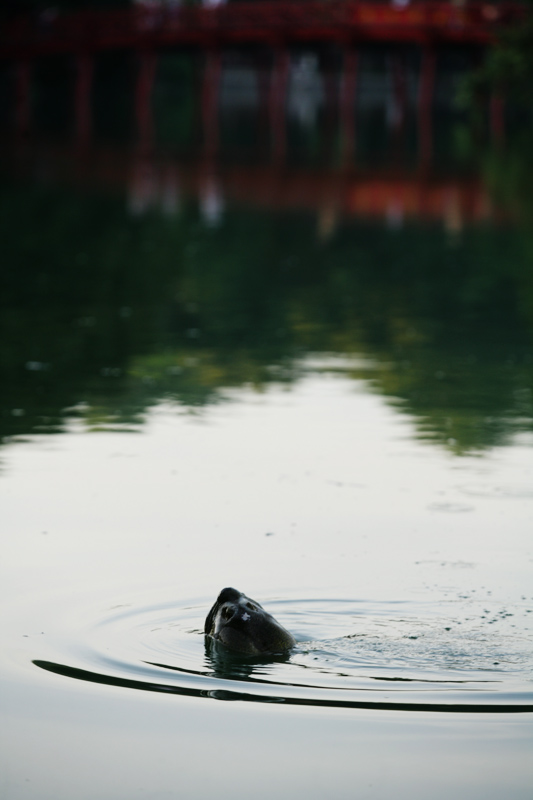

Scientific classification
- Kingdom: Animalia
- Phylum: Chordata
- Class: Reptilia
- Order: Testudines
- Suborder: Cryptodira
- Family: Trionychidae
- Genus: Rafetus
- Species: R. leloii

Binomial name
- Rafetus leloii Đức, 2000

Synonyms
- Rafetus vietnamensis Lê Trần Bình, 2010

= Hoan Kiem turtle =

Obsolete taxon of turtle

The Hoàn Kiếm turtle (Rafetus leloii) was an obsolete or controversial taxon of turtle from Southeast Asia, based on specimens from Hoàn Kiếm Lake in Hanoi, Vietnam. Most experts classify this turtle as synonymous with the rare Yangtze giant softshell turtle (Rafetus swinhoei), although some Vietnamese biologists asserted that R. leloii is a distinct species. If the two taxa are to be considered distinct, R. leloii may be considered extinct. However, a survey conducted in 2000 found several small populations including one juvenile in lakes in northern Vietnam.

The last known turtle, affectionately known to locals as "Cụ Rùa", meaning "great grandfather turtle" in Vietnamese, was reported dead on 26 January 2016. A local man saw the body of the turtle floating in the water and reported it to the authorities. The last time the turtle was spotted alive was on 28 December 2015.

== Classification ==
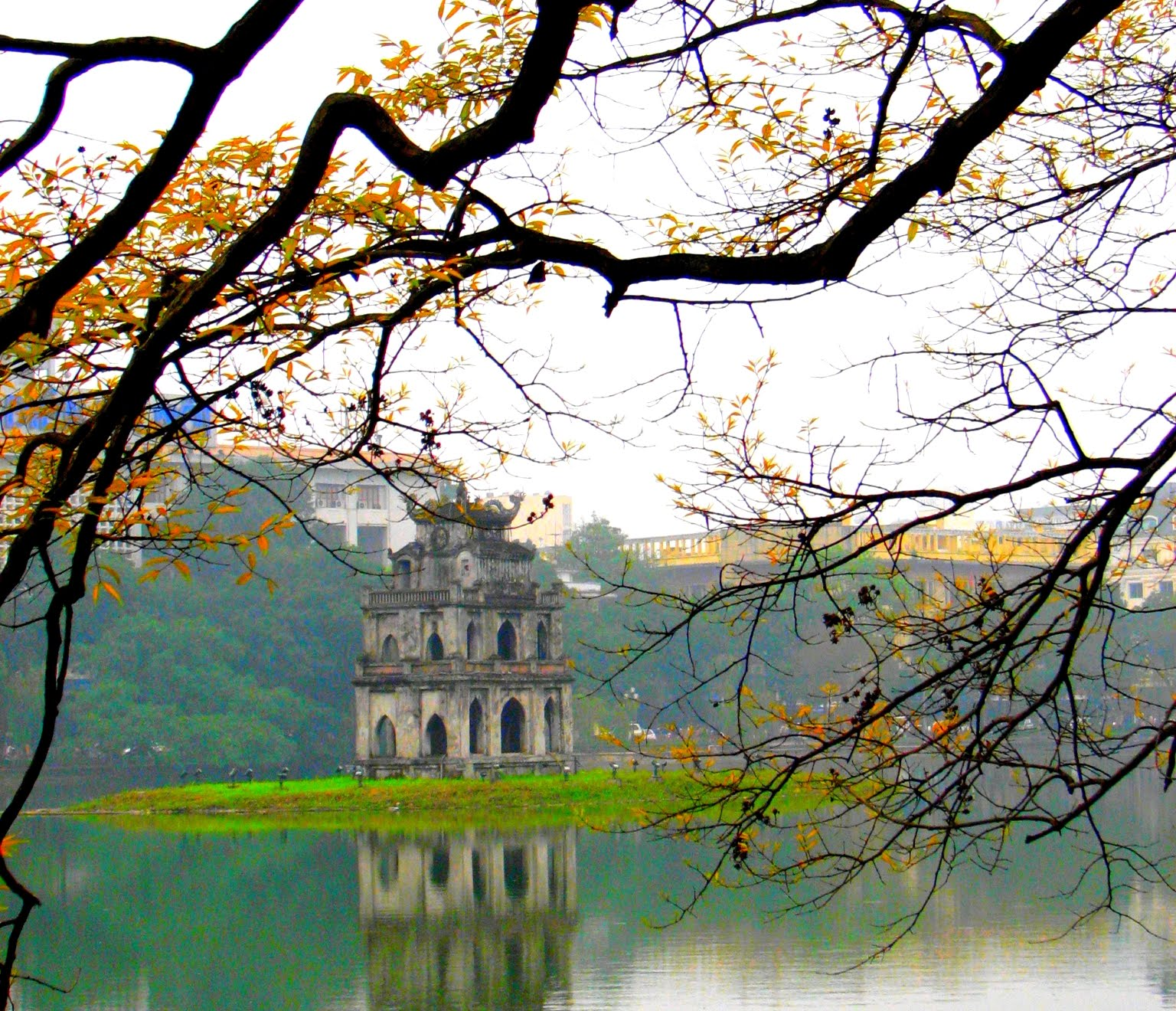
Turtle Tower (Tháp Rùa) on Hoàn Kiếm Lake, the natural habitat of the turtle in central Hanoi

Most authorities classify Rafetus leloii as a junior synonym of Rafetus swinhoei, based on a study by Farkas et al. However, some Vietnamese biologists, such as Hà Đình Đức, who first described Rafetus leloii, and Lê Trần Bình, insist that the two turtles are not the same species. Lê points out genetic differences as well as differences in morphology, re-describing the Hoan Kiem turtle as Rafetus vietnamensis. However, Farkas et al. repeated their 2003 conclusion in 2011, stating that differences between specimens may be due to age. They also pointed out that Lê et al. did not adequately describe their methods for DNA sequencing, and that the genetic sequences used were never sent to GenBank. They also criticized the fact that Lê et al. violated the ICZN Code by renaming the species from Rafetus leloii to Rafetus vietnamensis on the grounds of “appropriateness”. Another genetic analysis was purportedly when the turtle was rescued and cleaned, which allegedly showed it to be female and distinct from the R. swinhoei of China and Đồng Mô, Vietnam. However, the results were not formally announced or ever published in a peer-reviewed research article, and some skepticism has been cast on the results.

Đức has also hypothesized that Emperor Thái Tổ of the Lê dynasty brought the turtles from Thanh Hóa Province and released them in Hoàn Kiếm Lake. Recently, Đức and some researchers found skeletons of giant turtles in Yên Bái, Phú Thọ and Hòa Bình provinces.

== Mythology ==
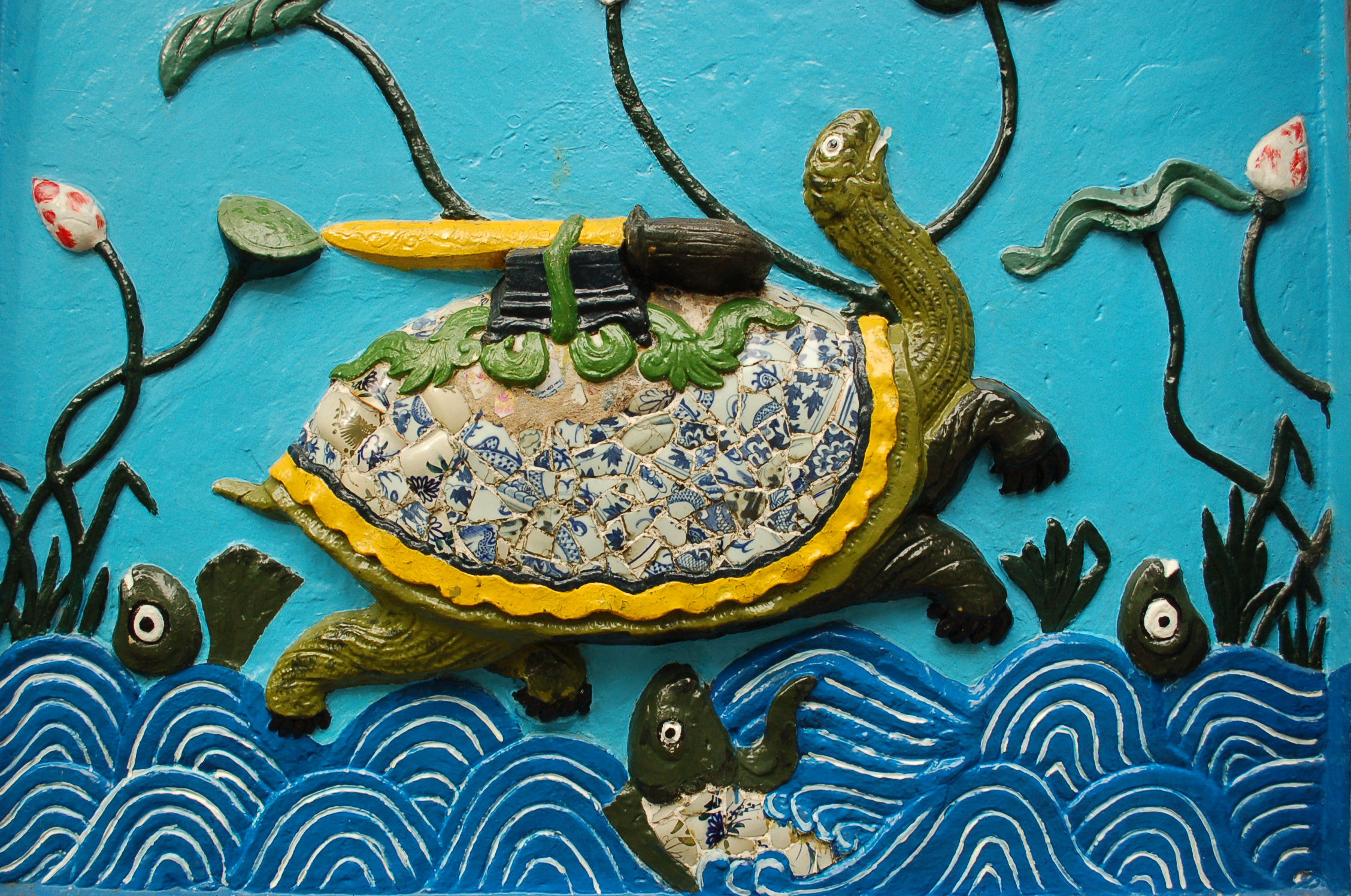
Depiction of the turtle Kim Quy with the Restored Sword, in the temple of the Jade Mountain

Stories of the Hoàn Kiếm turtle began in the fifteenth century with Lê Lợi, who became an emperor of Vietnam and founder of the Lê dynasty. According to legend, Lê Lợi had the sword named Heaven's Will given to him by the Golden Turtle God, Kim Quy.

One day, not long after the war and the Chinese had accepted Vietnam's independence, Lê Lợi was out boating on the lake. Suddenly the Golden Turtle God surfaced, prompting Lê Lợi to return Heaven's Will and thank the divine turtle for its help. The Golden Turtle God took back the sword and disappeared into depths of the lake. Lê Lợi then renamed the lake Hoàn Kiếm Lake (or Hồ Gươm), meaning "The Lake of the Returned Sword".

== Rediscovery ==
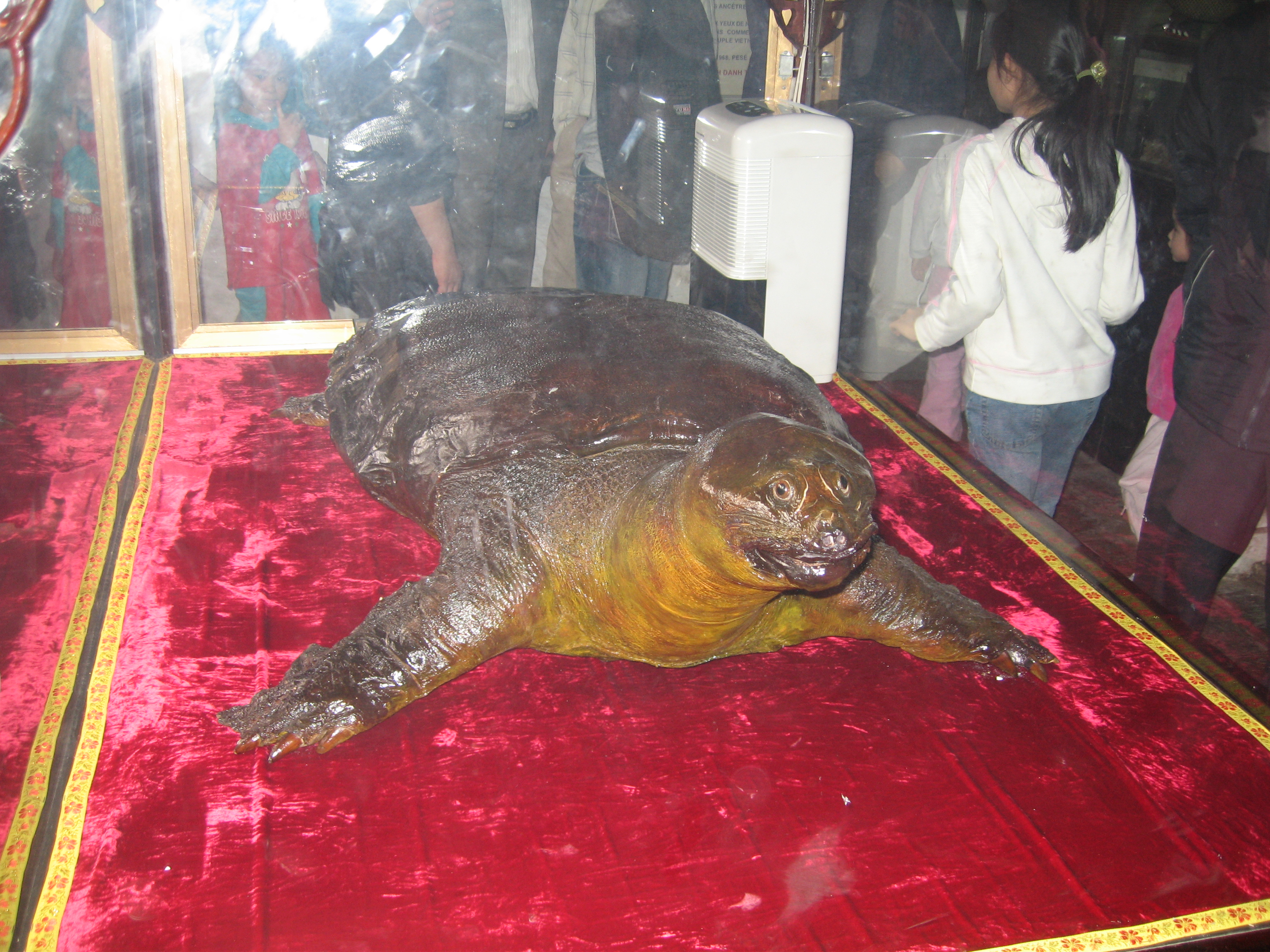
A preserved turtle on display in the Temple of the Jade Mountain

Near the northern shore of Hoàn Kiếm Lake lies Jade Island, on which the Temple of the Jade Mountain is located. On June 2, 1967, a Hoàn Kiếm turtle died from injuries caused by an abusive fisherman that was ordered to net the turtle and carry it, but instead hit the turtle with a crowbar. The turtle's body was preserved and placed on display in the temple. That particular specimen weighed 200 kg (440 lb) and measured 1.9 m (6.2 ft). Until that time, no one was sure if the species still lived.

On March 24, 1998, an amateur cameraman caught the creature on video, conclusively proving the elusive creatures still survived in the lake. Prior to its recent rediscovery, the turtles were thought to be only a legend and were classified as cryptozoological.

In 2000, professor Hà Đình Đức gave the Hoàn Kiếm turtle the scientific name Rafetus leloii. This nomenclature has been rejected by other herpetologists who assert leloii is synonymous with swinhoei.

By the spring of 2011, concerned with the Hoàn Kiếm specimen's more frequent than usual surfacing, and apparent lesions on its body, the city authorities started attempts to capture the giant reptile of Hoàn Kiếm Lake, and take it for medical treatment. On February 9, a local turtle farm operator, KAT Group, was chosen to prepare a suitable net to capture the sacred animal. The first attempt, on March 8, 2011, failed, as the turtle made a hole in the net with which the workers tried to capture it, and escaped. An expert commented, “It’s hard to catch a large, very large soft-shell turtle.” On March 31, in an unusual act, the turtle went to the shore to bask in the sun. Finally, on April 3, 2011, the giant turtle was netted in an operation that involved members of the Vietnamese military. The captured creature was put into an enclosure constructed on an island in the middle of the lake, for study and treatment. According to the scientists involved, the turtle was determined to be female, and genetic research suggested it was distinct from the R. swinhoei turtles in China, and Đồng Mô in Vietnam.

Some witnesses believe there are at least two or three turtles living in Hoàn Kiếm Lake and that the “smaller” one appears more regularly. Đức rejected these reports.

The last known Hoan Kiem turtle was found dead on 26 January 2016.

== Conservation concerns ==
Despite eyewitness sightings of two or more turtles, Đức believed that there was only one specimen left in Hoàn Kiếm Lake. Peter Pritchard, a turtle biologist, believed that there were no more than five specimens left in 2008.

The lake itself is both small and shallow, measuring 200 metres wide, 600 metres long, and only two meters deep. It is also badly polluted, although the turtles could conceivably live underwater indefinitely, coming to the surface only for an occasional gulp of air or a bit of sun. According to Pritchard, the turtles are threatened by municipal “improvements” around the lake. The banks have been almost entirely cemented over, leaving only a few yards of rocky beach where a turtle might find a place to bury her clutches of 100 or more eggs.

Plans were underway to clean the lake of pollution, and the construction of an artificial beach had been proposed to facilitate breeding. Dredging the lake, to clean up its bottom, was carried out in February and March 2011.

Đức urged people to protect this animal and is quoted as saying, “We hope that we will find a partner for the turtle in Hồ Gươm, so that our legendary animal could avoid extinction.” Believing the turtle to be different from R. swinhoei, he is against the idea of crossbreeding turtles of the two kinds. The turtle died in 2016.
