= Hoàn Kiếm Lake =

Lake in Hanoi, Vietnam

- Sword Lake
- Hồ Hoàn Kiếm/ Hồ Gươm (Vietnamese)
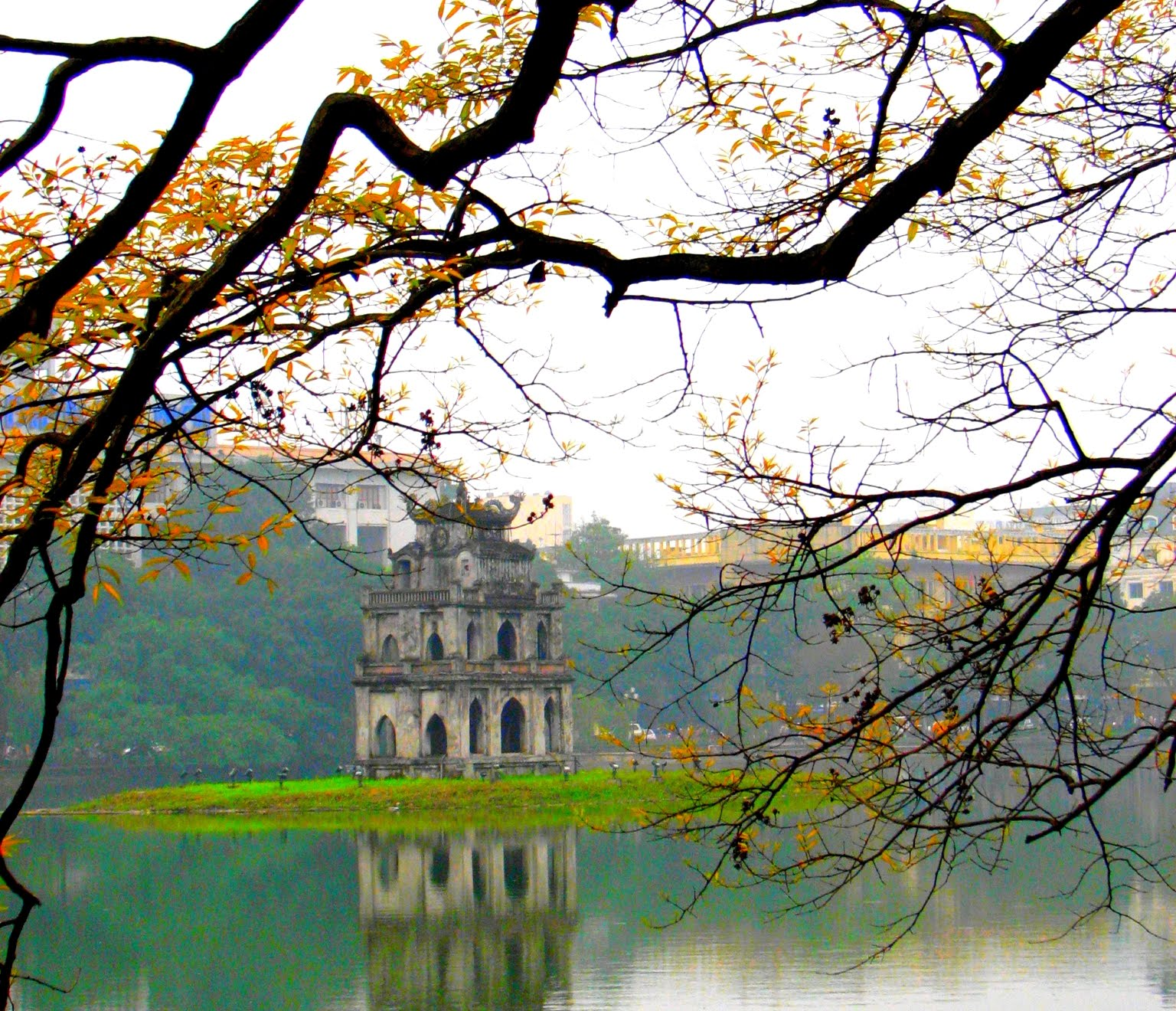
- Turtle Tower (Tháp Rùa) in the center of the lake

- Location within Vietnam
- Location: Hoàn Kiếm Ward, Hàng Khay Street, Hanoi
- Coordinates: 21°01′44″N 105°51′09″E
- Basin countries: Vietnam
- Max. length: 700 m (2,300 ft)
- Max. width: 250 m (820 ft)
- Surface area: 115,511 m^{2} (1,243,350 sq ft)
- Average depth: 1.2 m (3.9 ft)
- Max. depth: 2 m (6.6 ft)

Hoàn Kiếm Lake (Vietnamese: Hồ Hoàn Kiếm, chữ Hán: 湖還劍, meaning "Lake of the Returned Sword" or "Lake of the Restored Sword"), also known as Sword Lake (Hồ Gươm) or Tả Vọng Lake (Hồ Tả Vọng), is a fresh water lake, measuring some 12 ha in the historical center of Hanoi, the capital city of Vietnam.

In the past, the lake was variously named "Lục Thủy Lake" (Vietnamese: Hồ Lục Thủy, meaning "Green Water Lake" - aptly named for the water's color) or "Thủy Quân Lake" (Vietnamese: Hồ Thủy Quân, meaning "Mariner's Lake"). The lake is one of the major scenic spots in the city and serves as a focal point for its public life.

== History ==
According to the legend, after defeating Ming China, Emperor Lê Lợi was boating on the lake when a Golden Turtle God (Kim Qui) surfaced and asked for his magic sword, Heaven's Will. Lợi concluded that Kim Quy had come to reclaim the sword that its master, a local God, the Dragon King (Long Vương) had given Lợi sometime earlier to defeat Ming China. Later, the Emperor gave the sword back to the turtle after he finished fighting off the Chinese. Emperor Lợi renamed the lake to commemorate this event from its former name Lục Thủy meaning "Green Water". The Turtle Tower (Tháp Rùa) standing on a small island near the center of the lake is linked to the legend. The first name of Hoàn Kiếm lake was Tả Vọng when the Emperor had not given the Magical Sword back to the Golden Turtle God (Cụ Rùa).

Large soft-shell turtles, either of the species Rafetus swinhoei or a separate species named Rafetus leloi in honor of the emperor, had been sighted in the lake for many years. The last known individual was found dead on January 19, 2016. There are three remaining turtles of the species R. swinhoei.

Near the northern shore of the lake lies Jade Islet, on which the Temple of the Jade Mountain (Ngọc Sơn Temple) stands. The temple was erected in the 18th century. It honors the 13th-century military leader Trần Hưng Đạo who distinguished himself in defeating the Mongol invasions of Vietnam thrice; the classic scholar Văn Xương; and Nguyễn Văn Siêu, a famous writer and official who undertook repairs of the temple in 1864. Jade Island is connected to the shore by the wooden Thê Húc Bridge, painted vermillion red. The bridge's name is poetically translated as "Perch of the Morning Sunlight".

== Gallery ==
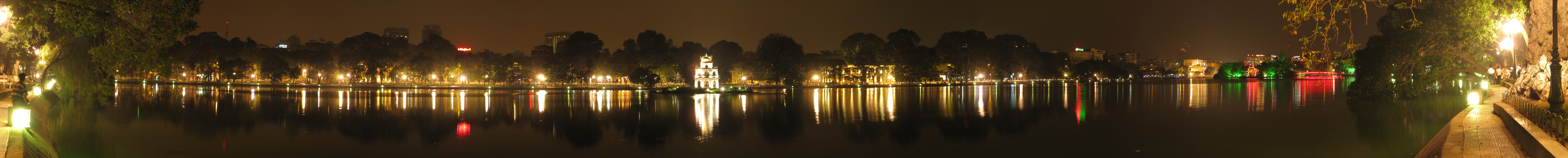
A panoramic view of the Hoàn Kiếm Lake by night
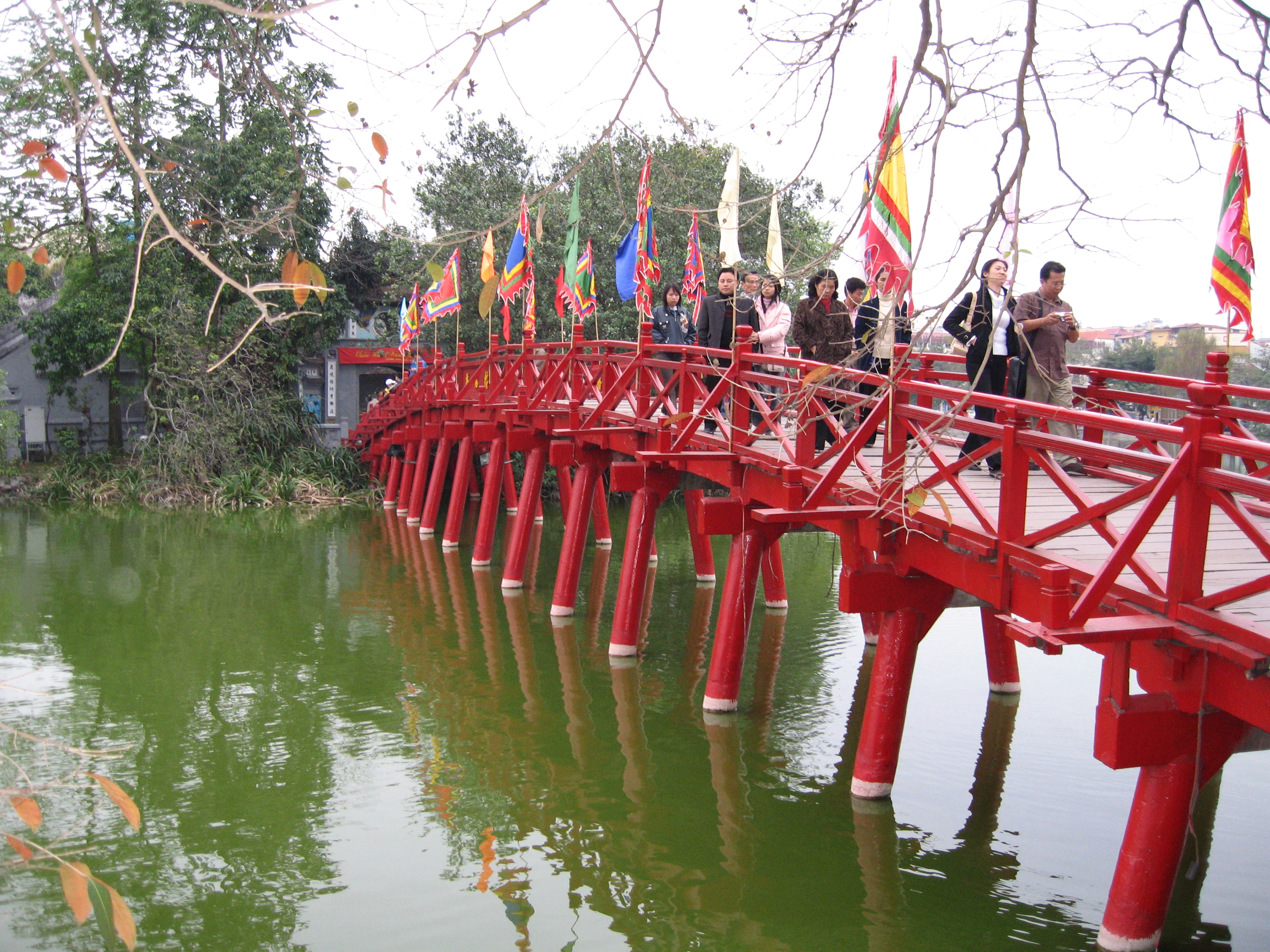
Thê Húc Bridge

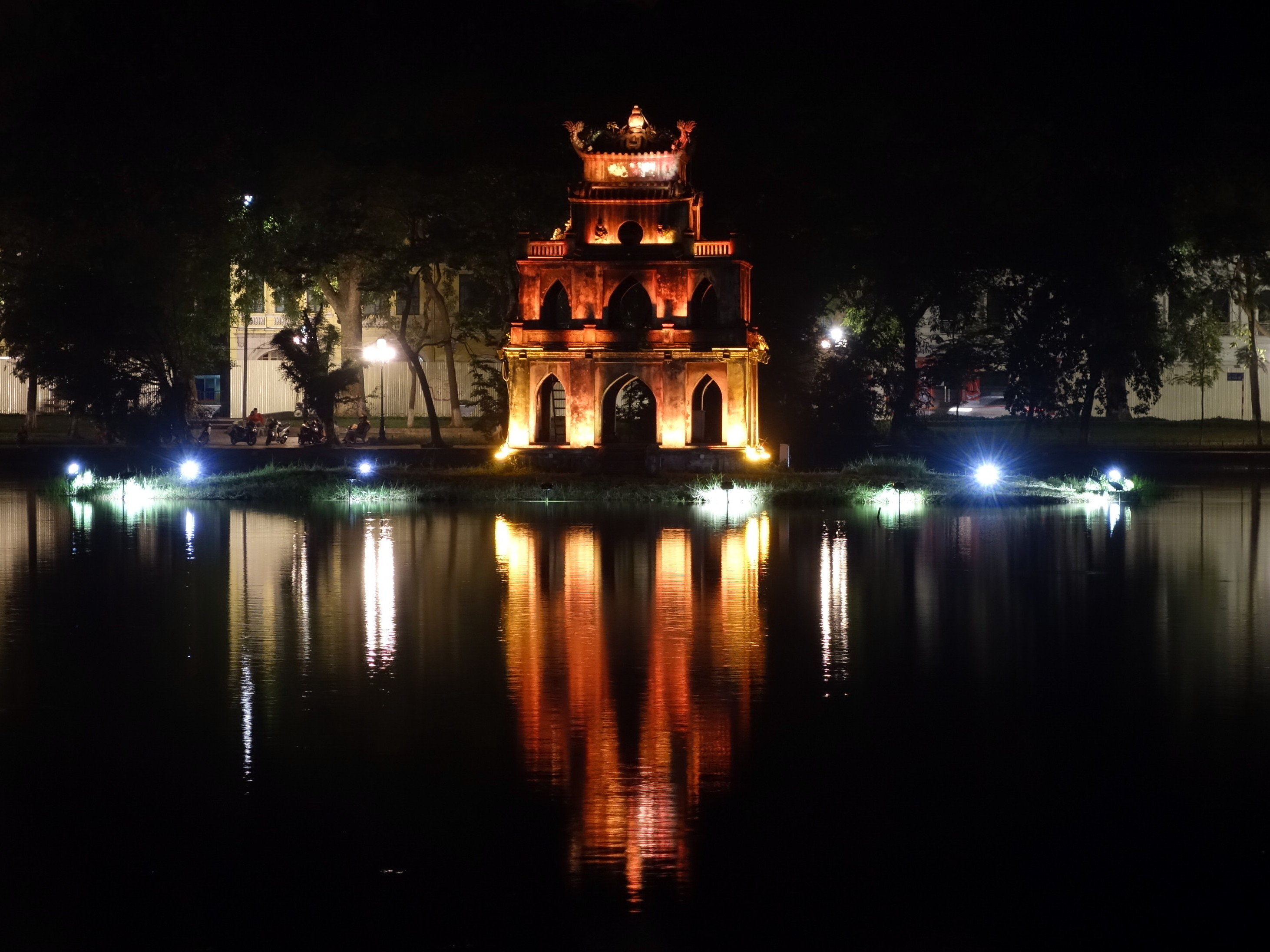
Turtle Tower at night
