= An Ninh =

An Ninh may refer to several places in Vietnam, including:

- An Ninh, Hà Nam, a rural commune of Bình Lục District
- An Ninh, Sóc Trăng, a rural commune of Châu Thành District
- An Ninh, Quảng Bình, a rural commune of Quảng Ninh District
- An Ninh, Quỳnh Phụ, a rural commune of Quỳnh Phụ District, Thái Bình Province
- An Ninh, Tiền Hải, a rural commune of Tiền Hải District, Thái Bình Province

== See also ==
- An Ninh Đông, Long An, a rural commune of Đức Hòa District
- An Ninh Đông, Phú Yên, a rural commune of Tuy An District
- An Ninh Tây, Long An, a rural commune of Đức Hòa District
- An Ninh Tây, Phú Yên, a rural commune of Tuy An District
