= Thê Húc Bridge =

Thê Húc Bridge Cầu Thê Húc
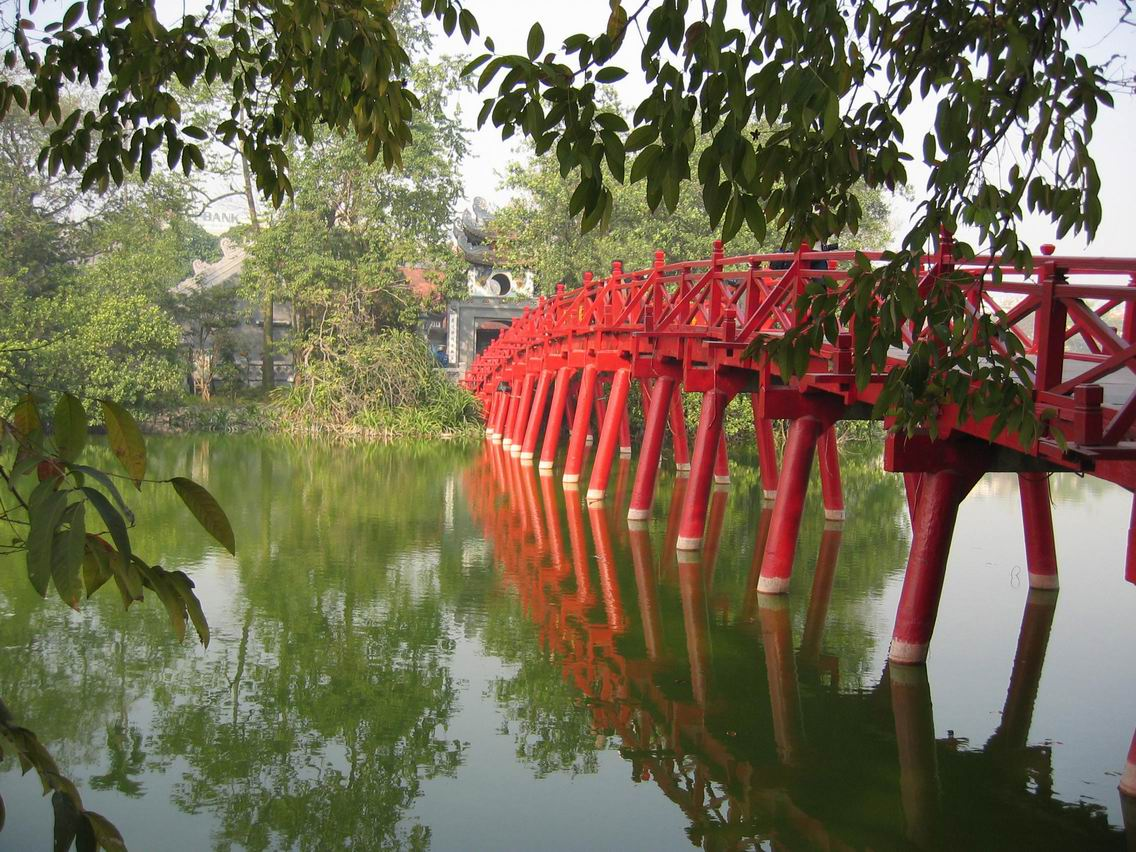
- Thê Húc Bridge
- Coordinates: 21°1′50.70″N 105°51′10.8″E
- Carries: pedestrians
- Crosses: Hoàn Kiếm Lake

History
- Opened: 1865
- Rebuilt: 1897

Location
- Interactive map of Thê Húc Bridge

Thê Húc Bridge (Vietnamese: Cầu Thê Húc, ‹The template Chunom is being considered for deletion.› chữ Nôm: 橋棲旭), is a footbridge over Hoàn Kiếm Lake within Hanoi, Vietnam.

== History ==
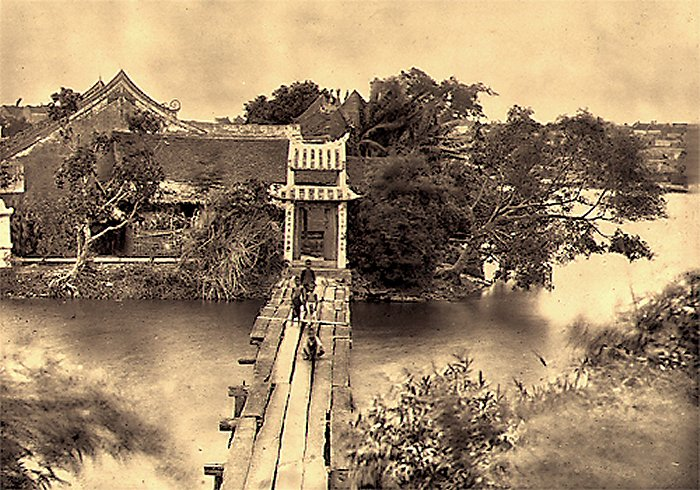
The bridge under construction in 1884 by Dr. Hocquard

In 1865, during the reign of Tự Đức, the scholar Nguyễn Văn Siêu commissioned a bridge connecting the bank of the river with the Ngọc Sơn Temple (Vietnamese: Đền Ngọc Sơn). He named it "Thê Húc" (meaning "the rising and perching sun").

The bridge has undergone full reconstruction twice since it was first built. The first time was in 1897 during the reign of Thành Thái. The second time was initiated in 1952 under then-mayor Thẩm Hoàng Tín after the bridge collapsed on New Year's Eve due to an overabundance of visitors to Ngọc Sơn Temple. Under the supervision of architect Nguyễn Bá Lăng, the bridge was rebuilt in 1953, with the foundation recast in cement instead of wood.

Thê Húc Bridge has also been set on fire in 1887 in an act of arson. During their colonial rule, the French assigned Ngọc Sơn Temple to be a residence of a French mandarin and banned worship at the site. In defiance, two students, 17-year-old Nguyễn Văn Minh and 14-year-old Đức Nghi plotted to burn bridge. The fire scared the French enough for them withdraw from staying in that temple, as well as withdrawing the French troops stationed at Trấn Quốc temple, Châu Long Pagoda and the Yên Phụ village communal house. However, when the plot was discovered, Minh was arrested, imprisoned, and finally executed in 1888 at the age of 18.

It was believed to be first photographed by Charles-Édouard Hocquard, who captured the bridge in its 19th century state between 1884 and 1885.

== Description ==
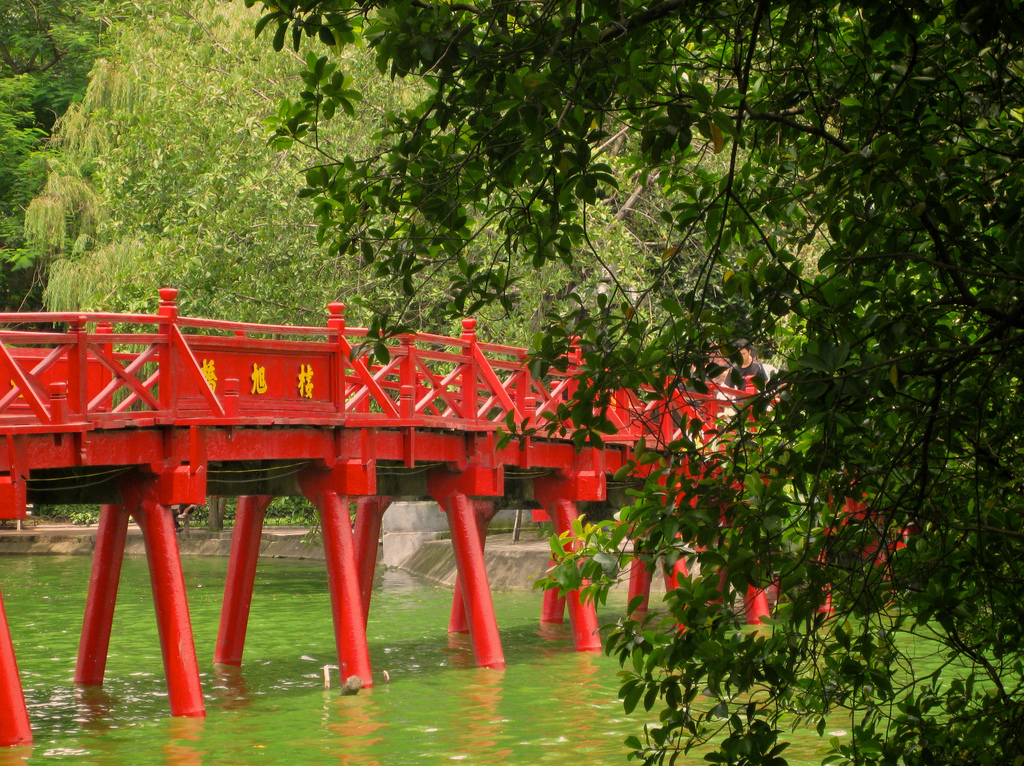
Thê Húc Bridge is seen here with its name written in chữ Hán, the characters say 棲旭橋 (Thê Húc Kiều). The characters are to be read from right to left.

The bridge now consists of 15 spans with 32 round wooden pillars arranged in 16 pairs. The bridge deck is paved and the surface railings are painted dark red, with the words 棲旭橋 (Thê Húc Kiều) gilded. Although still hallowed to a certain extent, it is now widely visited by a broad range of locals and tourists who purchase a ticket.

== Gallery ==
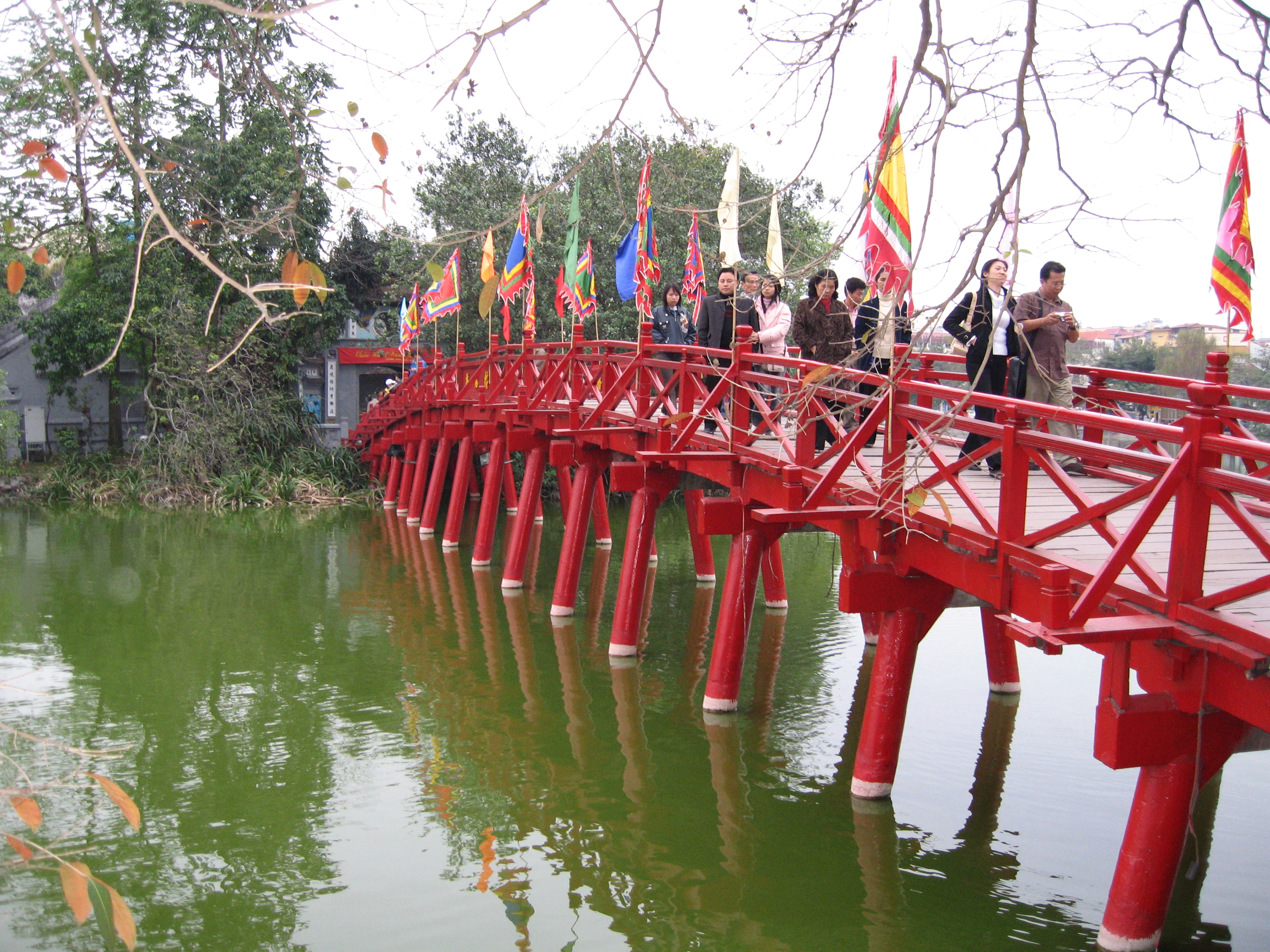
Bridge entering the temple with flags displayed

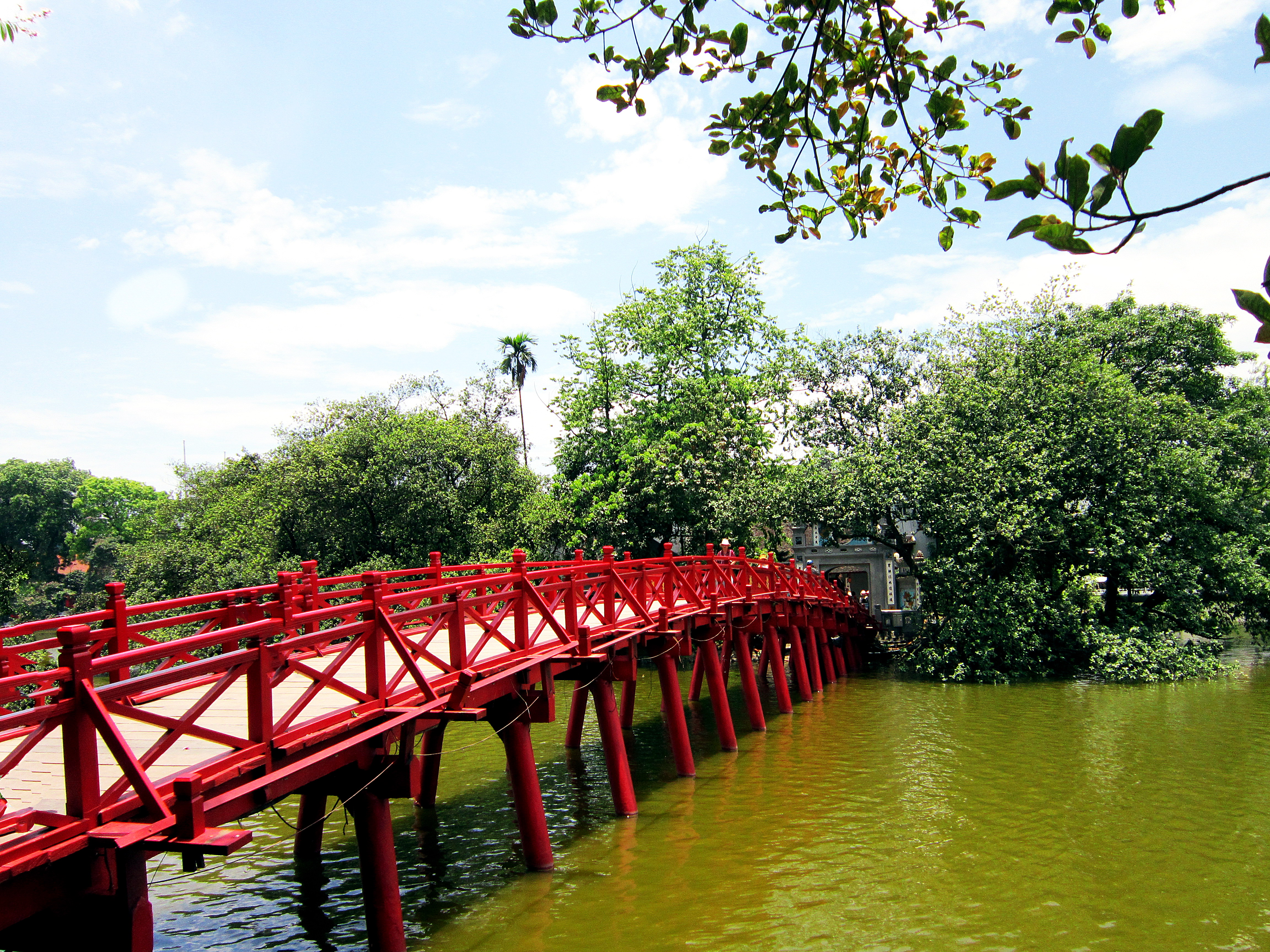
The bridge

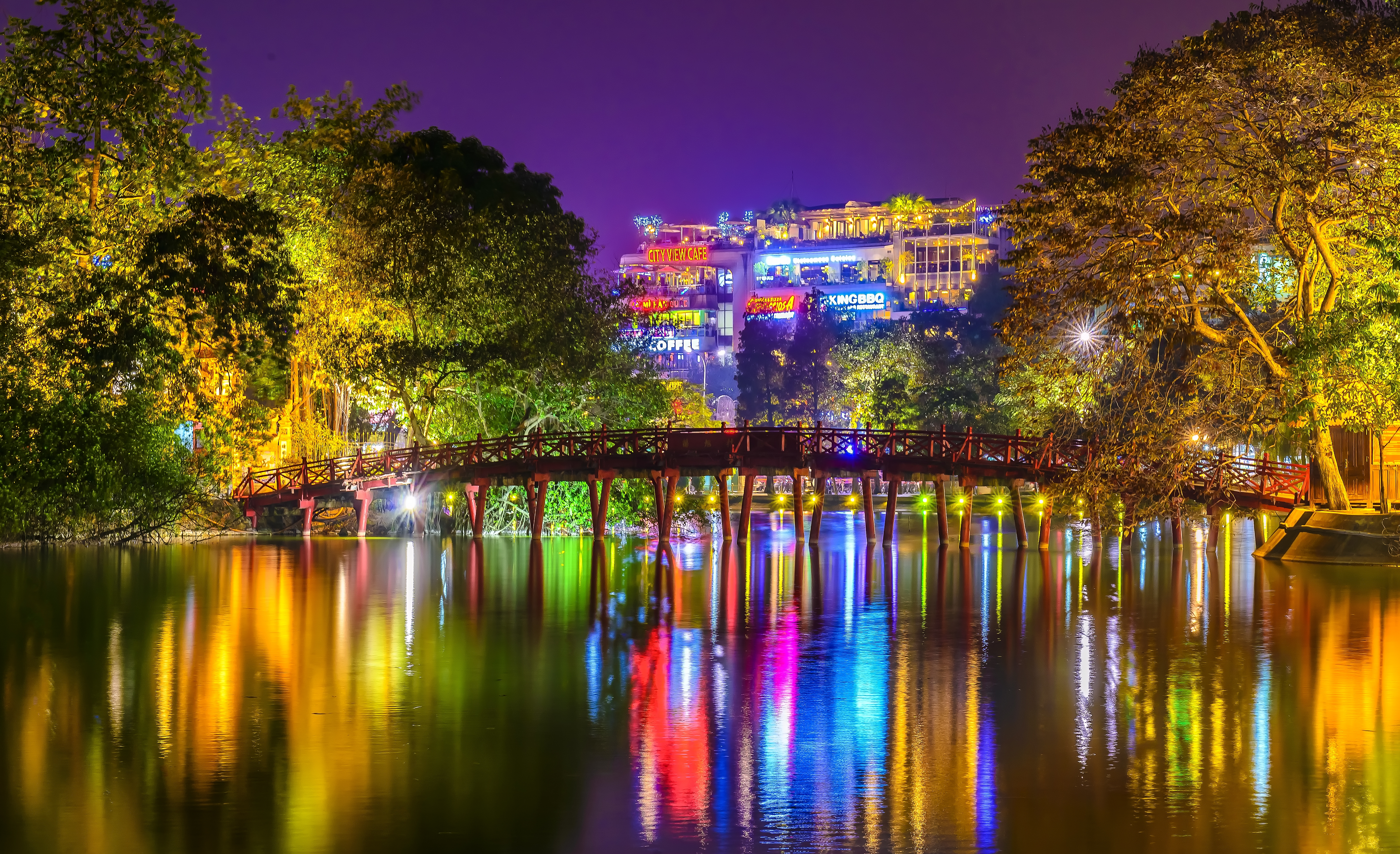
The bridge at night in 2015

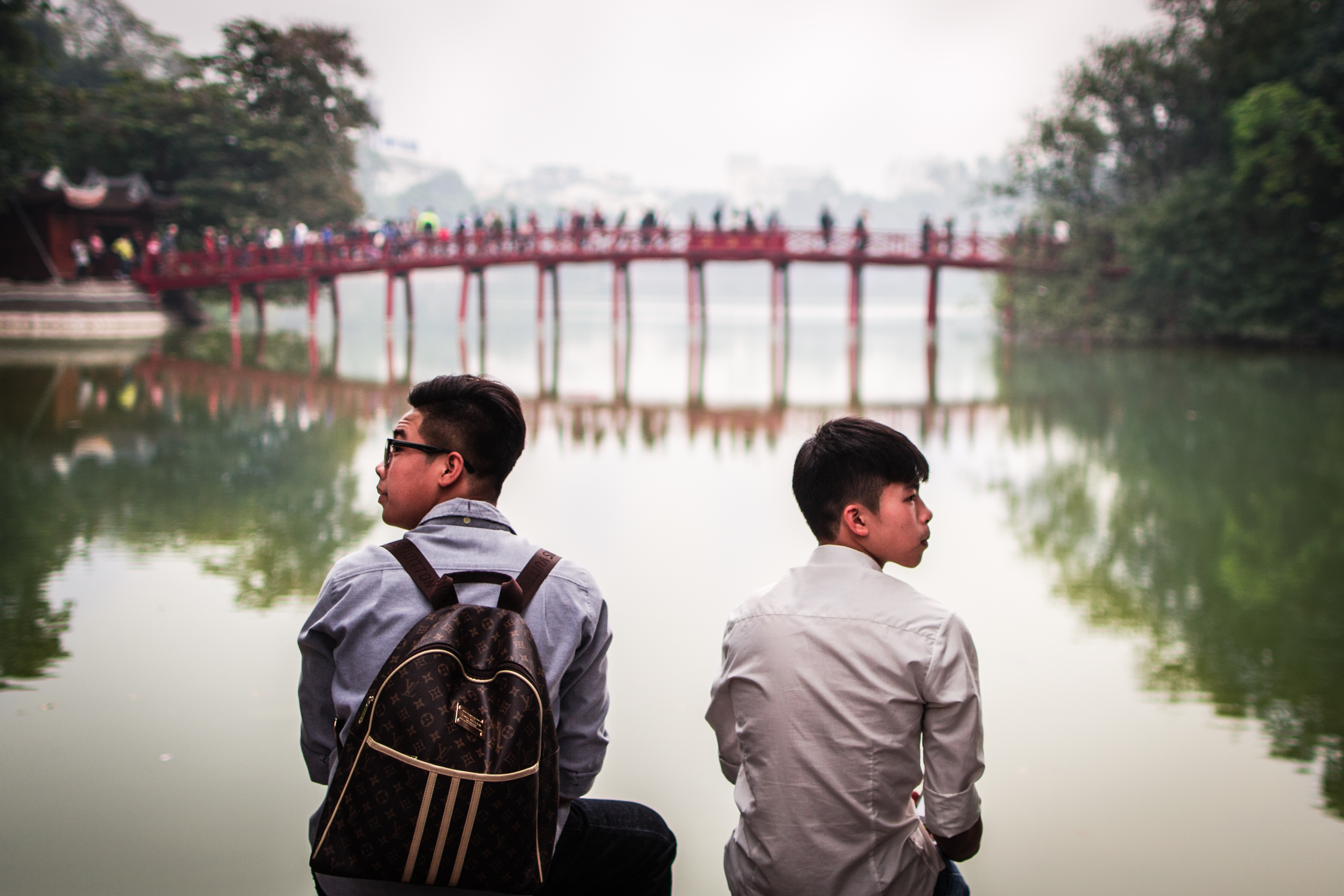
Students in 2016 at the lakeside across the bridge
