= Suzhou Zoo =

- Location: Suzhou, China

The Suzhou Zoo (Chinese: 苏州上方山森林动物世界; pinyin: Sūzhōu Shàngfāng shān sēnlín dòngwù shìjiè) is a zoo in Suzhou, China. In 2015, a female Yangtze giant softshell turtle was artificially inseminated at the zoo in an attempt to save the species from extinction. The turtle did not survive.
