= Turtle Tower =

Historic structure in Hanoi, Vietnam

Coordinates: 21°01′40″N 105°51′08″E

- Tháp Rùa / 塔𪛇 (Vietnamese)
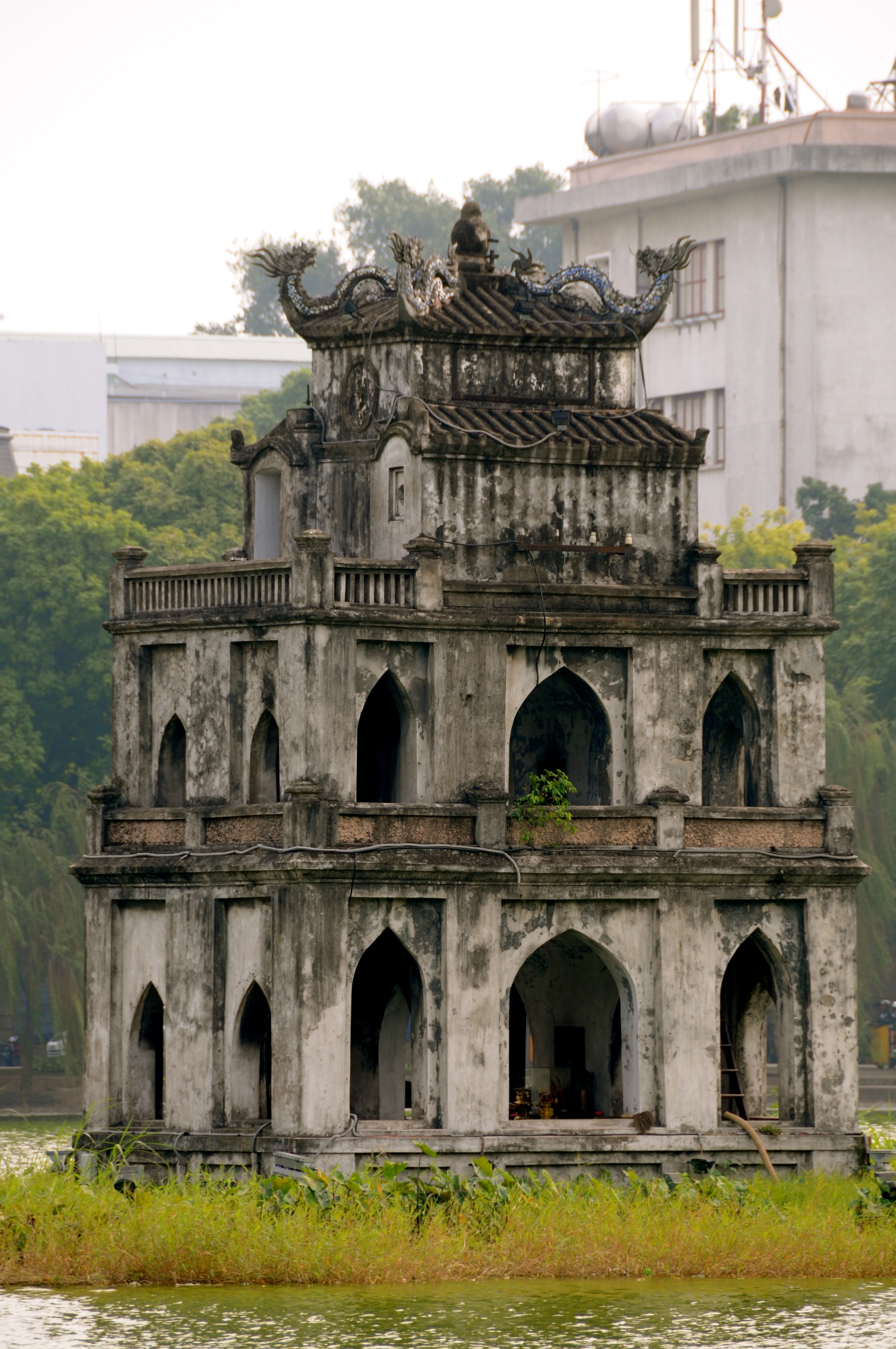
- Interactive map of Turtle Tower
- Location: Hoàn Kiếm Lake, Hanoi, Vietnam

History
- Built: 1886; 140 years ago

Site notes
- Architectural styles: Gothic & ancient Vietnamese architecture

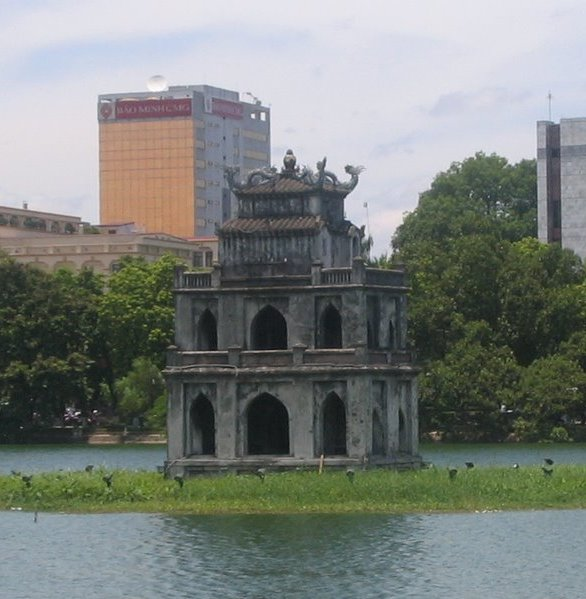
The tower is located on an island in the middle of Hoan Kiem Lake

The Turtle Tower (Vietnamese: Tháp Rùa / 塔𪛇), also called the Tortoise Tower, is a small tower in the middle of Hoan Kiem Lake (Sword Lake) in central Hanoi, Vietnam. It is one of the most iconic, symbolic and most recognizable pieces of architecture representing Hanoi and the entirety of Vietnam.

== History ==
The island was first used as a fishing site. In the 1400s, under Lê Thánh Tông a tower was built to improve the comfort of the emperor's fishing. In the 17th and 18th centuries, under the Revival Lê dynasty, the Trịnh lords had Tả Vọng Temple built on the islet. In the 18th century, under the Nguyễn lords the temple disappeared.

In 1886, while Vietnam was occupied by the French, Nguyễn Hữu Kim, an intermediary between the Nguyễn and French governments, received permission from the government to build a tower in the middle of Hoàn Kiếm Lake in honor of Lê Lợi, one of the most famous figures of Vietnamese history and one of its greatest heroes. Legends surrounding his life involving the sword, Thuận Thiên and Hoan Kiem turtle are associated with Hoàn Kiếm Lake and the island.

According to researcher Doãn Kế Thiện in the book "Cổ tích và thắng cảnh Hà Nội" (Published 1959, transl. Relics and landmarks of Hanoi), Nguyễn Hữu Kim secretly buried his father and mother below the tower in the night after construction started. However, when he came back in the morning, the two wooden coffins had been unearthed and is now empty.

On 24 March 2013, the special page Gia đình và Xã hội of the Sức khỏe và Đời sống newspaper published an article interviewing a great-grandson and wife of a grandson of Nguyễn Hữu Kim about this matter.

The three-story tower was still completed and was originally named Bá hộ Kim Tower.

In 1890, the French installed a miniature Statue of Liberty on top of the tower. In 1945, after French control was overthrown by the Japanese army, the Vietnamese government had the statue removed.

== See also ==
- Hoan Kiem turtle
