= Ngọc Sơn Temple =

Temple in Vietnam

Coordinates: 21.0307°N 105.8520°E

- Vietnamese: Đền Ngọc Sơn
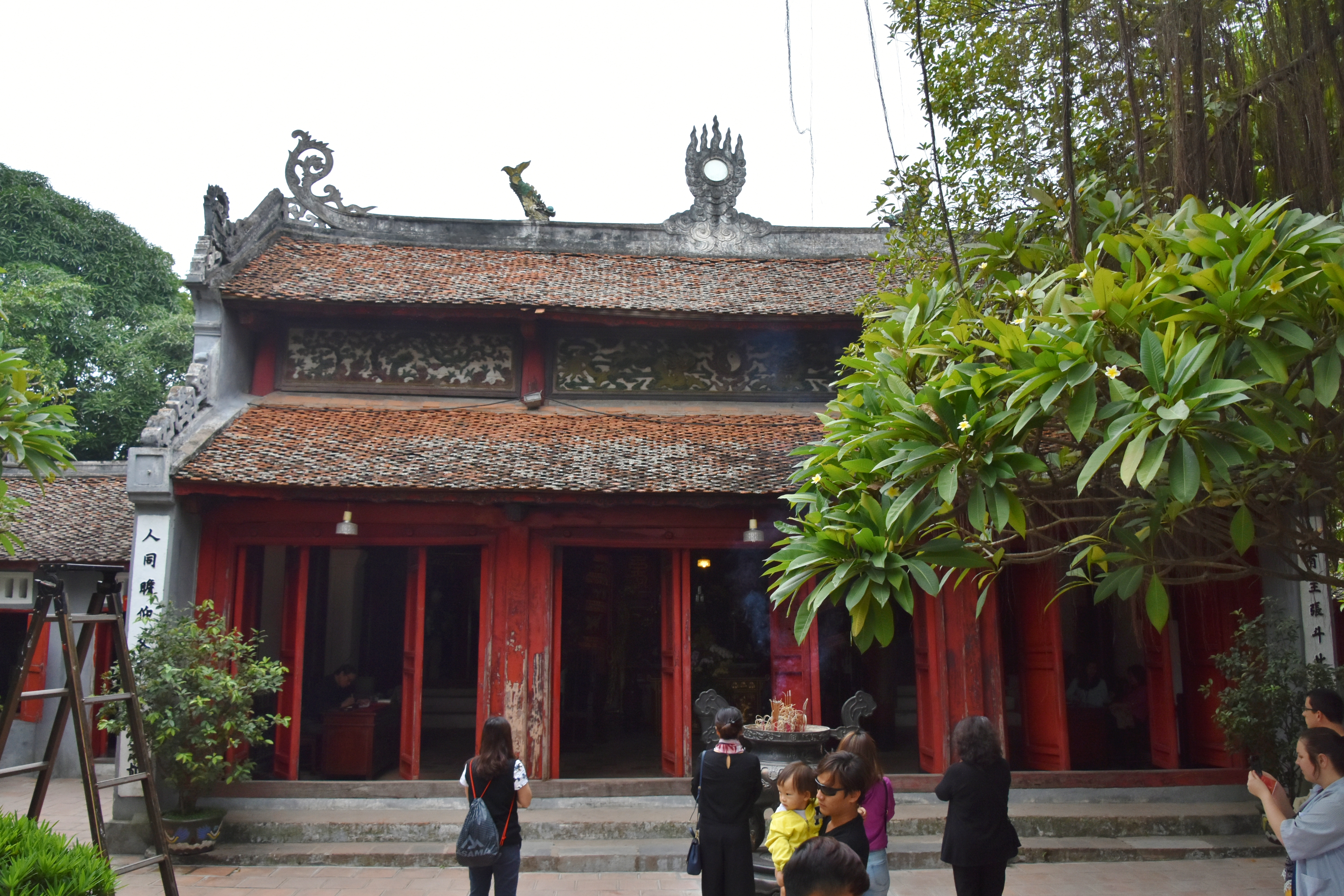

Religion
- Affiliation: Taoism, Confucianism, Thánh Trần worship
- District: Hoàn Kiếm
- Province: Hanoi
- Deity: Wenchang Dijun; Guan Yu; Lü Dongbin; Trần Hưng Đạo

Location
- Country: Vietnam
- Interactive map of Ngọc Sơn Temple

The Ngọc Sơn Temple (Vietnamese: Đền Ngọc Sơn, chữ Nôm: 𪽛玉山) is located on an islet in Hoàn Kiếm Lake, central Hanoi, Vietnam.

== History ==
The temple was built in early 19th century, originally dedicated to "Three Sages" Wenchang Dijun, Guan Yu and Lü Dongbin. At some point, the national hero, Trần Hưng Đạo, was incorporated into the temple.

From the shore, Thê Húc Bridge (Cầu Thê Húc) leads to the islet. Buildings of the temple include the Tháp Bút ("The Pen Tower"), the Đài Nghiên (ink-slab), the Đắc Nguyệt ("moon contemplation pavilion") and the Đình Trấn Ba (pavilion against waves), all of which have symbolic meaning.

== Gallery ==
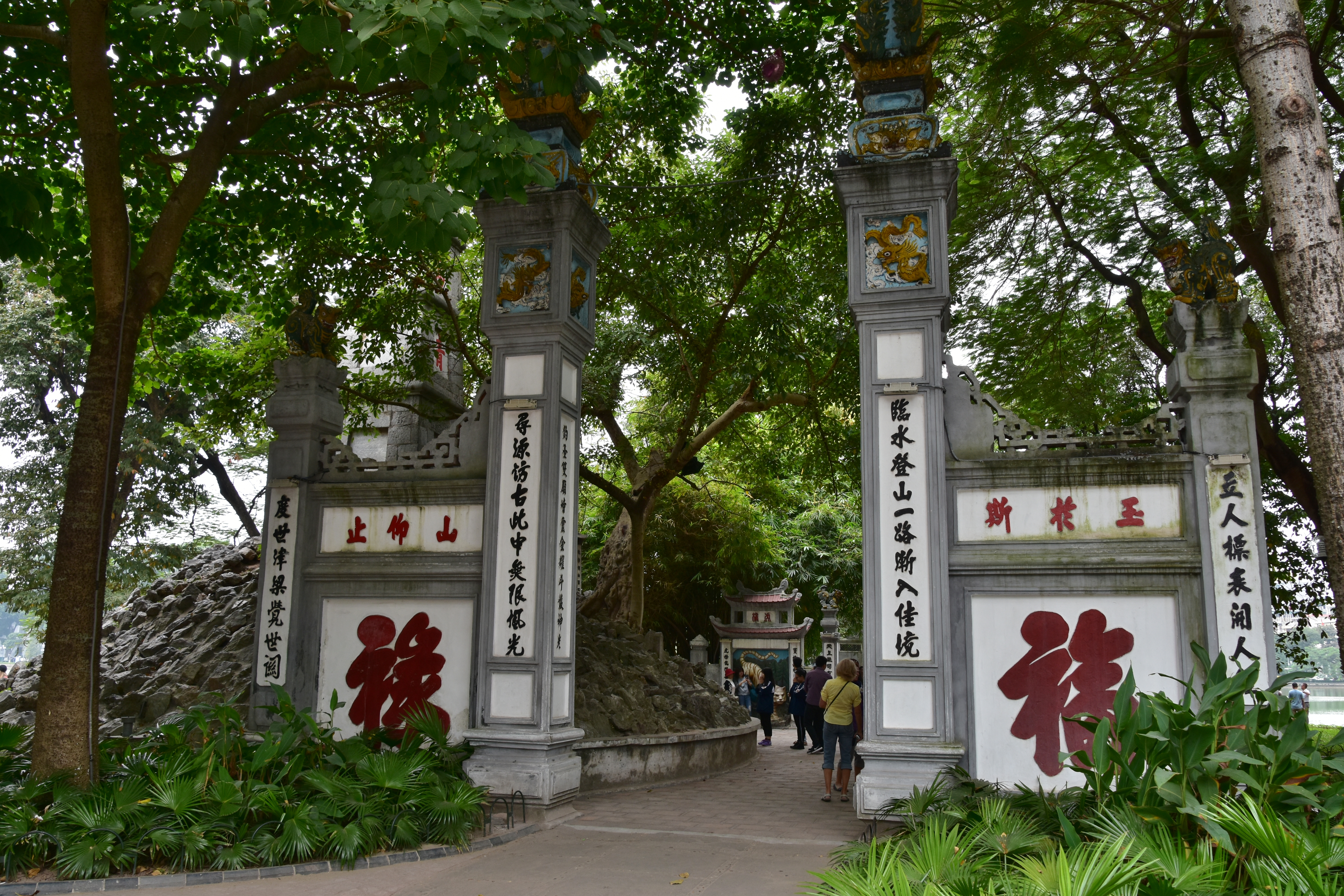
Entrance to the temple

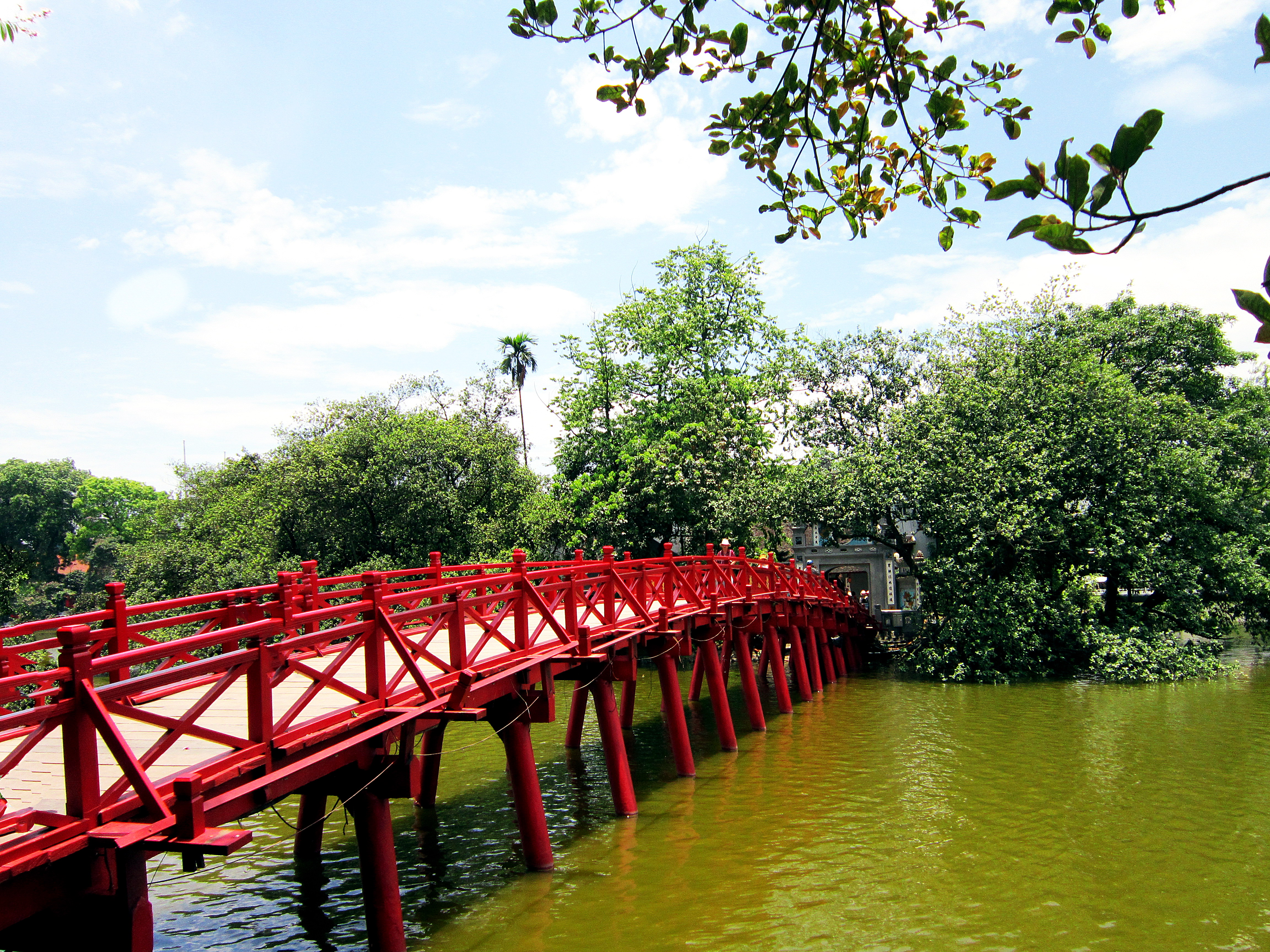
Thê Húc Bridge leads to the temple

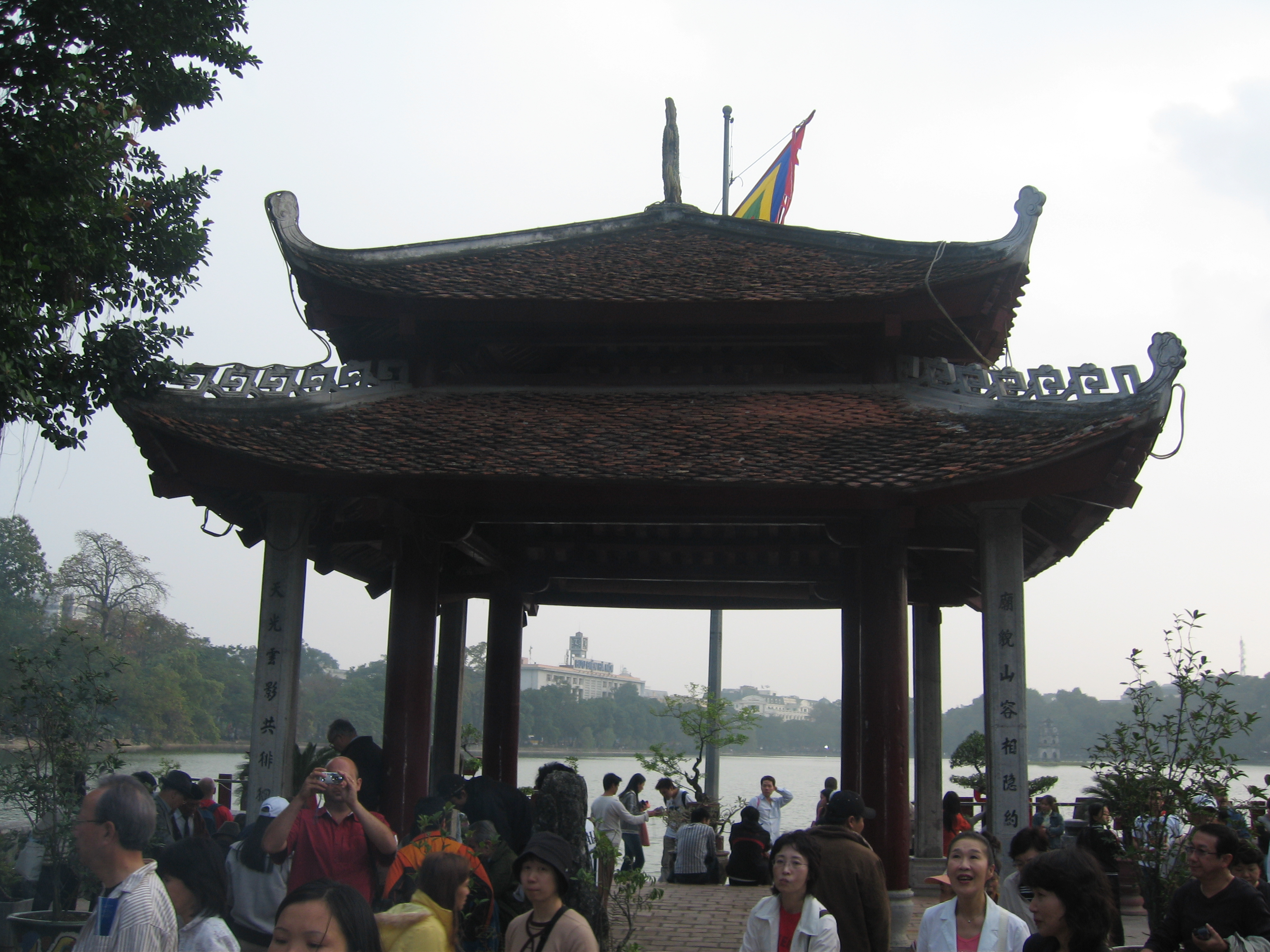
A Vietnamese communal temple (Đình Trấn Ba) at the temple site

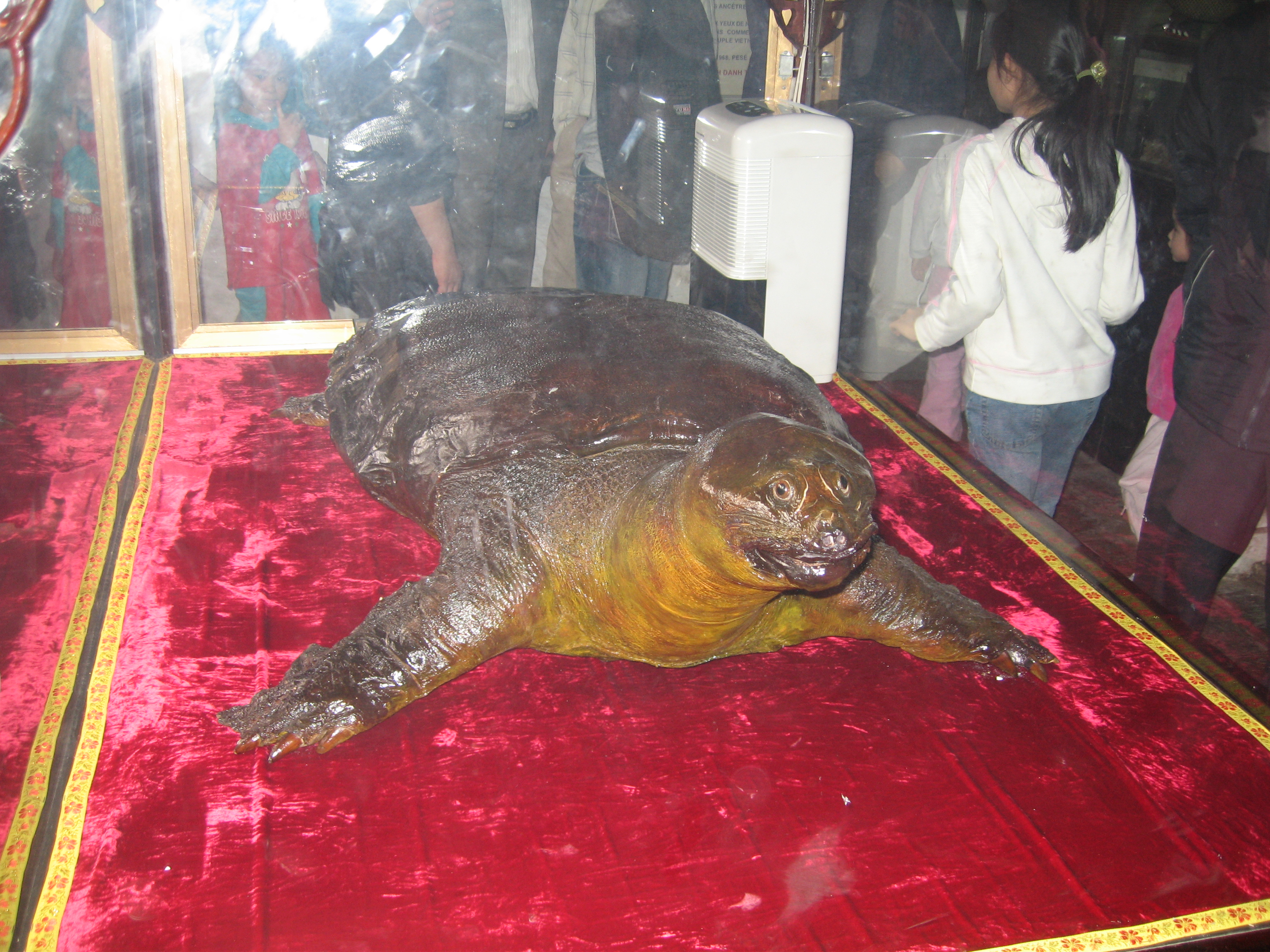
A preserved Hoàn Kiếm turtle on display in the temple
