= Vạn Ninh =

- Commune
- National Route 1 through Vạn Ninh commune
- Interactive map of Vạn Ninh
- Coordinates: 12.691616054784829°N 109.22196086544406°E
- Country: Vietnam
- Region: South Central Coast and Central Highlands
- Province: Khánh Hòa
- Established: 2025
- Administrative headquarters: 469 Hùng Vương Street

Area
  - Total: 130.46 km^{2} (50.37 sq mi)

Population (2025)
  - Total: 54,202
  - Density: 415/km^{2} (1,070/sq mi)

Vạn Ninh is a commune in northern Khánh Hòa province, Vietnam.

On 16 June 2025, the Standing Committee of the National Assembly of Vietnam issued Resolution No. 1667/NQ-UBTVQH15 on the arrangement of commune-level administrative units in Khánh Hòa province. Under the resolution, Vạn Ninh commune was established from the entire area and population of Vạn Giã township, Vạn Phú commune, and Vạn Lương commune, formerly part of Vạn Ninh district.
