= Ninh Châu =

- Commune and village
- Location in Vietnam
- Coordinates: 17°20′24″N 106°41′56″E
- Country: Vietnam
- Province: Quảng Trị

Area
  - Total: 33.22 sq mi (86.03 km^{2})

Population (2024)
  - Total: 30,098
  - Density: 906.1/sq mi (349.9/km^{2})
- Time zone: UTC+07:00

Ninh Châu is a commune (xã) and village in Quảng Trị Province, in Vietnam.

On June 16, 2025, the Standing Committee of the National Assembly issued Resolution No. 1680/NQ-UBTVQH15 on the reorganization of commune-level administrative units in Quảng Trị Province in 2025. Accordingly, Tân Ninh Commune, Gia Ninh Commune, Duy Ninh Commune, and Hải Ninh Commune were merged to form a new commune named Ninh Châu Commune.
