= Trường Sơn, Quảng Trị =

Coordinates: 17°15′34″N 106°34′38″E

Trường Sơn
- Commune and village
- Interactive map of Trường Sơn
- Country: Vietnam
- Province: Quảng Trị
- Time zone: UTC+07:00

Trường Sơn is a commune (xã) and village in Quảng Trị Province, in Vietnam.

On June 16, 2025, the Standing Committee of the National Assembly issued Resolution No. 1680/NQ-UBTVQH15 on the reorganization of commune-level administrative units in Quảng Trị Province in 2025. Accordingly, Trường Xuân Commune and Trường Sơn Commune were merged to form a new commune named Trường Sơn Commune.
