= Thọ Xuân district =

Coordinates: 19.917°N 105.500°E

Thọ Xuân district Huyện Thọ Xuân
- District
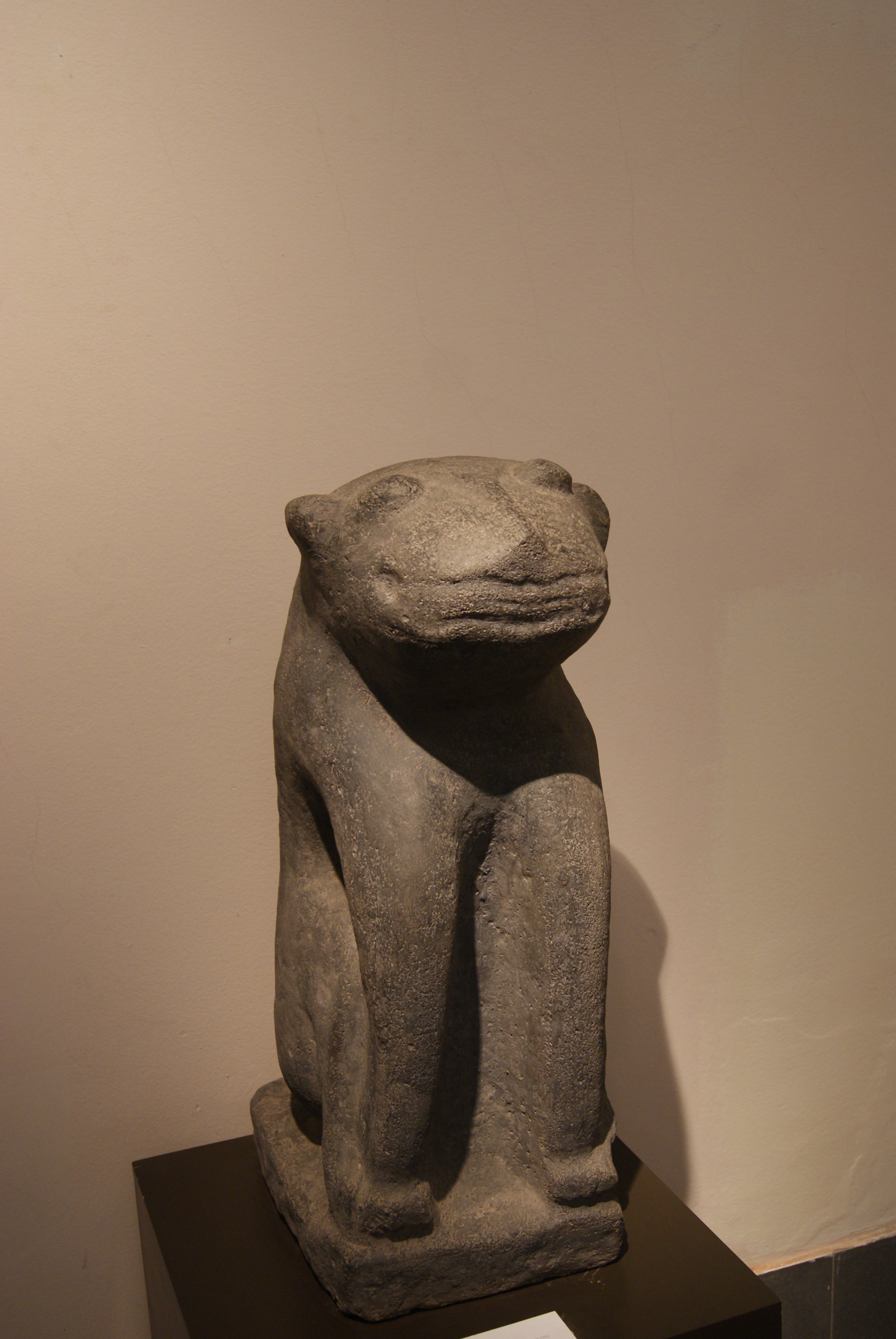
- Statue of a tiger from the Lê Lợi mausoleum
- Interactive map of Thọ Xuân district
- Country: Vietnam
- Region: North Central Coast
- Province: Thanh Hóa

Area
  - Total: 233 sq mi (603 km^{2})

Population (2018)
  - Total: 233,752
- Time zone: UTC+7 (UTC + 7)

Thọ Xuân is a former district (huyện) of Thanh Hóa province in the North Central Coast region of Vietnam.

As of 2003 the district had a population of 233,603. The district covers an area of 603 km^{2} (233 sq mi). The district capital lies at Lam Sơn.

== Administration ==
Thọ Xuân district has 30 commune-level administrative units, including 3 towns: Thọ Xuân (district capital), Lam Sơn, Sao Vàng and 27 communes: Bắc Lương, Nam Giang, Phú Xuân, Quảng Phú, Tây Hồ, Thọ Diên, Thọ Hải, Thọ Lâm, Thọ Lập, Thọ Lộc, Thọ Xương, Thuận Minh, Trường Xuân, Xuân Bái, Xuân Giang, Xuân Hòa, Xuân Hồng, Xuân Hưng, Xuân Lai, Xuân Lập, Xuân Minh, Xuân Phong, Xuân Phú, Xuân Sinh, Xuân Thiên, Xuân Tín, Xuân Trường.

== Climate ==
Climate data for Bái Thượng, Thọ Xuân District
Month	Jan	Feb	Mar	Apr	May	Jun	Jul	Aug	Sep	Oct	Nov	Dec	Year
Record high °C (°F)	33.6 (92.5)	36.2 (97.2)	37.7 (99.9)	40.5 (104.9)	41.5 (106.7)	41.5 (106.7)	40.5 (104.9)	39.0 (102.2)	37.4 (99.3)	35.4 (95.7)	36.2 (97.2)	34.3 (93.7)	41.5 (106.7)
Mean daily maximum °C (°F)	20.7 (69.3)	21.5 (70.7)	24.0 (75.2)	28.3 (82.9)	32.1 (89.8)	33.4 (92.1)	33.5 (92.3)	32.3 (90.1)	31.1 (88.0)	28.9 (84.0)	26.1 (79.0)	22.6 (72.7)	27.9 (82.2)
Daily mean °C (°F)	16.9 (62.4)	18.0 (64.4)	20.4 (68.7)	24.1 (75.4)	27.0 (80.6)	28.5 (83.3)	28.5 (83.3)	27.8 (82.0)	26.7 (80.1)	24.6 (76.3)	21.5 (70.7)	18.2 (64.8)	23.6 (74.5)
Mean daily minimum °C (°F)	14.3 (57.7)	15.8 (60.4)	18.2 (64.8)	21.4 (70.5)	23.8 (74.8)	25.3 (77.5)	25.3 (77.5)	24.9 (76.8)	23.9 (75.0)	21.7 (71.1)	18.4 (65.1)	15.2 (59.4)	20.7 (69.3)
Record low °C (°F)	2.6 (36.7)	5.7 (42.3)	6.9 (44.4)	12.3 (54.1)	16.3 (61.3)	19.9 (67.8)	21.1 (70.0)	21.5 (70.7)	17.3 (63.1)	13.5 (56.3)	8.1 (46.6)	1.0 (33.8)	1.0 (33.8)
Average precipitation mm (inches)	28.9 (1.14)	27.2 (1.07)	47.2 (1.86)	87.6 (3.45)	248.2 (9.77)	249.0 (9.80)	244.0 (9.61)	338.7 (13.33)	329.6 (12.98)	219.0 (8.62)	84.3 (3.32)	24.7 (0.97)	1,938.5 (76.32)
Average rainy days	10.9	11.8	14.9	14.5	17.3	16.0	15.9	18.0	14.5	11.7	8.4	6.8	161.5
Average relative humidity (%)	86.6	87.6	88.9	88.4	85.2	83.7	83.7	86.5	86.0	84.8	83.1	83.5	85.7
Mean monthly sunshine hours	78.1	57.6	58.2	95.1	153.6	154.3	164.1	160.1	152.5	145.1	130.4	99.8	1,448.9
Source: Vietnam Institute for Building Science and Technology
