= Quảng Ninh district =

Quảng Ninh District Huyện Quảng Ninh
- District
- Seal

- Location in Vietnam
- Coordinates: 17°14′24″N 106°46′48″E
- Country: Vietnam
- Region: North Central Coast
- Province: Quảng Bình
- Capital: Quảng Ninh

Area
  - Total: 459.81 sq mi (1,190.89 km^{2})

Population (2003)
  - Total: 90,000
- Time zone: UTC+7 (Indochina Time)

Quảng Ninh is a former rural district in Quảng Bình province. The district capital is Quán Hàu. Quảng Ninh borders Đồng Hới to the north, Bố Trạch to the northwest, Lệ Thủy district to the south and the South China Sea to the east. Quảng Ninh has an area of 1,190.89 km^{2}, and in 2004 the population was 90,000. The district has 25 km of coastline and a 35 km border with Laos. National Route 1, Ho Chi Minh Highway and the Hanoi–Saigon Railway crosses this district. The two main rivers are Nhật Lệ River and Long Đại River.

== Subdivisions ==
This district is divided into:

- One townlet: Quán Hàu
- 14 communes (xã): Võ Ninh, Lương Ninh, Hải Ninh, Duy Ninh, Vĩnh Ninh, Hàm Ninh, Hiền Ninh, Xuân Ninh, An Ninh, Gia Ninh, Tân Ninh, Vạn Ninh, Trường Xuân and Trường Sơn.
