= Thuận Thiên (sword) =

Mythical sword of the Vietnamese Emperor Lê Lợi (r. 1428-33)

A depiction of Lê Lợi

Thuận Thiên (順天, lit. "to obey, to accord with, to comply with Heaven") was the mythical sword of the Vietnamese Emperor Lê Lợi, who liberated Vietnam from Ming occupation after ten years of fighting from 1418 until 1428. Lê Lợi then proclaimed himself emperor of the newly established Lê dynasty. According to legend, the sword possessed magical power, which supposedly made Lê Lợi grow very tall. When he used the sword it gave him the strength of 10 thousand men, and the legend is often used to justify Lê Lợi's rule over Vietnam. The sword has been associated with Lê Lợi since the early phase of the Lê dynasty.

== Name ==
The Thuận Thiên sword was used to affirm the legitimacy of Lê Lợi as the Vietnamese leader in the revolution against the Ming occupation and associated with Lê Lợi the rightful sovereignty of Vietnam. In Vietnam, the legitimacy of the monarch is known as the mandate of heaven.

== Legend ==
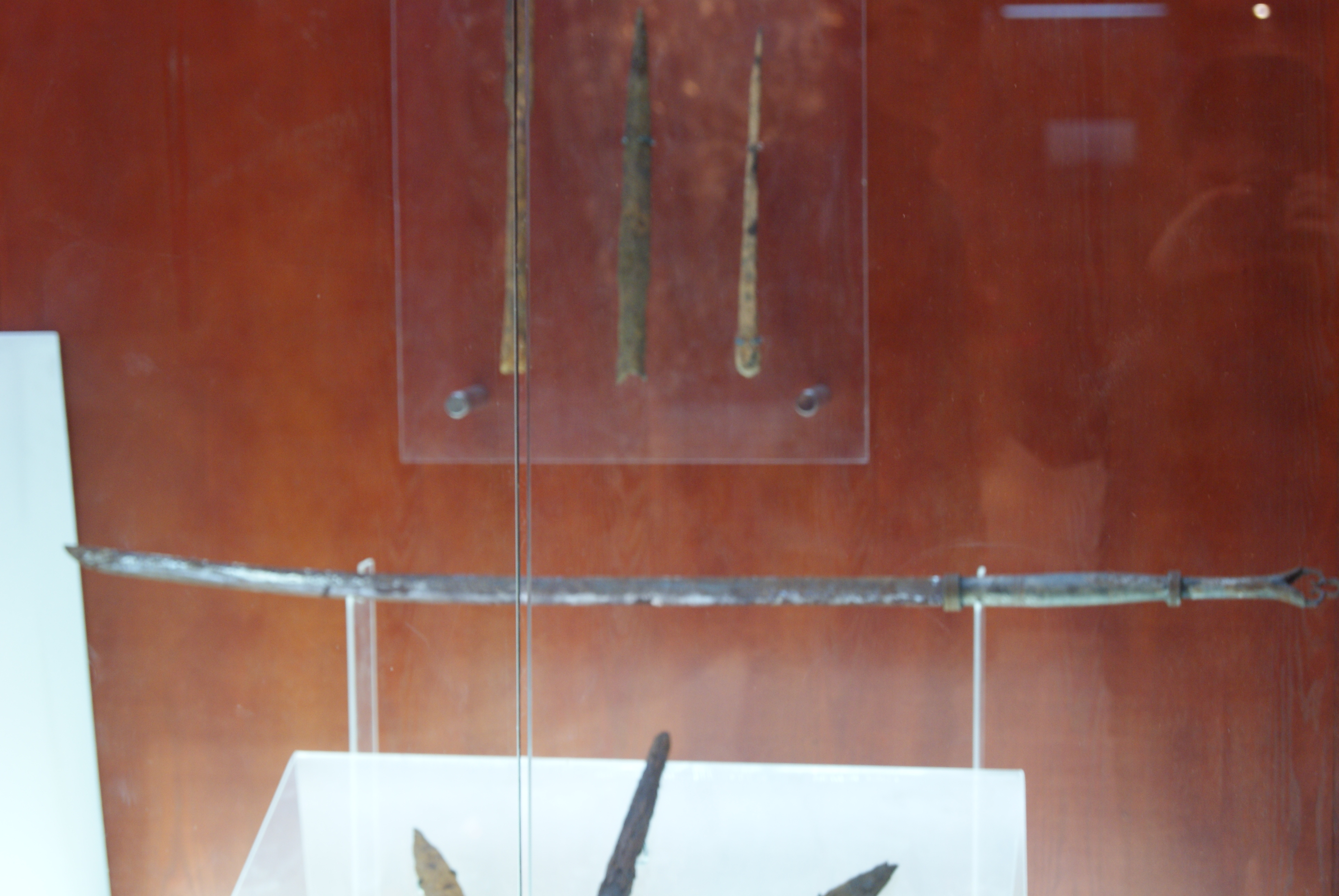
A 14th century single edged curved blade called "gươm"- Thuận Thiên may belong to this class of sword

Lê Lợi revolted in 1418 against the Ming dynasty, who had invaded and occupied Vietnam in 1407. Initially the military campaign against the Chinese was only moderately successful. While Lê Lợi was able to operate in his home province of Thanh Hóa, for the first 2–3 years, he was unable to muster the military forces required to defeat the Ming army in battle. As a result, he waged a guerrilla campaign against the large and well-organized Chinese army. According to legend, to help Lê Lợi, a local God, the Dragon King (Vietnamese: Long Vương) decided to lend his sword to Lê Lợi. But there was a catch; the sword did not come straight to him in one piece. It was split into two parts: a blade and a sword hilt.

First, in Thanh Hóa province, there was a fisherman named Lê Thận, who was not related to Lê Lợi in any way. One night, his fishing net caught something heavy. Thinking of how much money he would get for this big fish, he became very excited. However, his excitement soon turned into disappointment when he saw that his catch was a long, thin piece of metal which had somehow become entangled to the net. He threw it back into the water, and recast the net at a different location. When he pulled the net in, the metal piece had found its way back into the net. He picked it up and threw it far away with all his strength. The third time the fishing net came up, the same thing happened, the metal piece was once again caught in the net. Bewildered, he brought his lamp closer and carefully examined the strange object. Only then did he notice that it was the missing blade of a sword. He took the blade home and not knowing what to do with it, put it in the corner of his house.

Some years later, Lê Thận joined the rebel army of Lê Lợi, where he quickly rose in ranks. Once, the general visited Lê Thận's home. Lê Thận's house lacked lighting, so everything was dark. But as though it was sensing the presence of Lê Lợi, the blade at the corner of the house suddenly emitted a bright glow. Lê Lợi held up the blade and saw two words manifesting before his very eye: Thuận Thiên (Will of Heaven). With Lê Thận's endorsement, Lê Lợi took the blade with him. One day, while on the run from the enemy, Lê Lợi saw a strange light emanating from the branches of a banyan tree. He climbed up and there he found a hilt of a sword, encrusted with precious gems. Remembering the blade he found earlier, he took it out and placed it into the hilt. The fit was perfect. Believing that the Heaven had entrusted him with the great cause of freeing the land, Lê Lợi took up arms and rallied people under his banner. For the next few years, the magic sword brought him victory after another. His men no longer had to hide in the forest, but aggressively penetrated many enemy camps, captured them and seized their granaries. The sword helped them push back the enemy, until Vietnam was once again free from Chinese rule. Lê Lợi ascended the throne in 1428, ending his 10-year campaign, and reclaimed independence for the country.

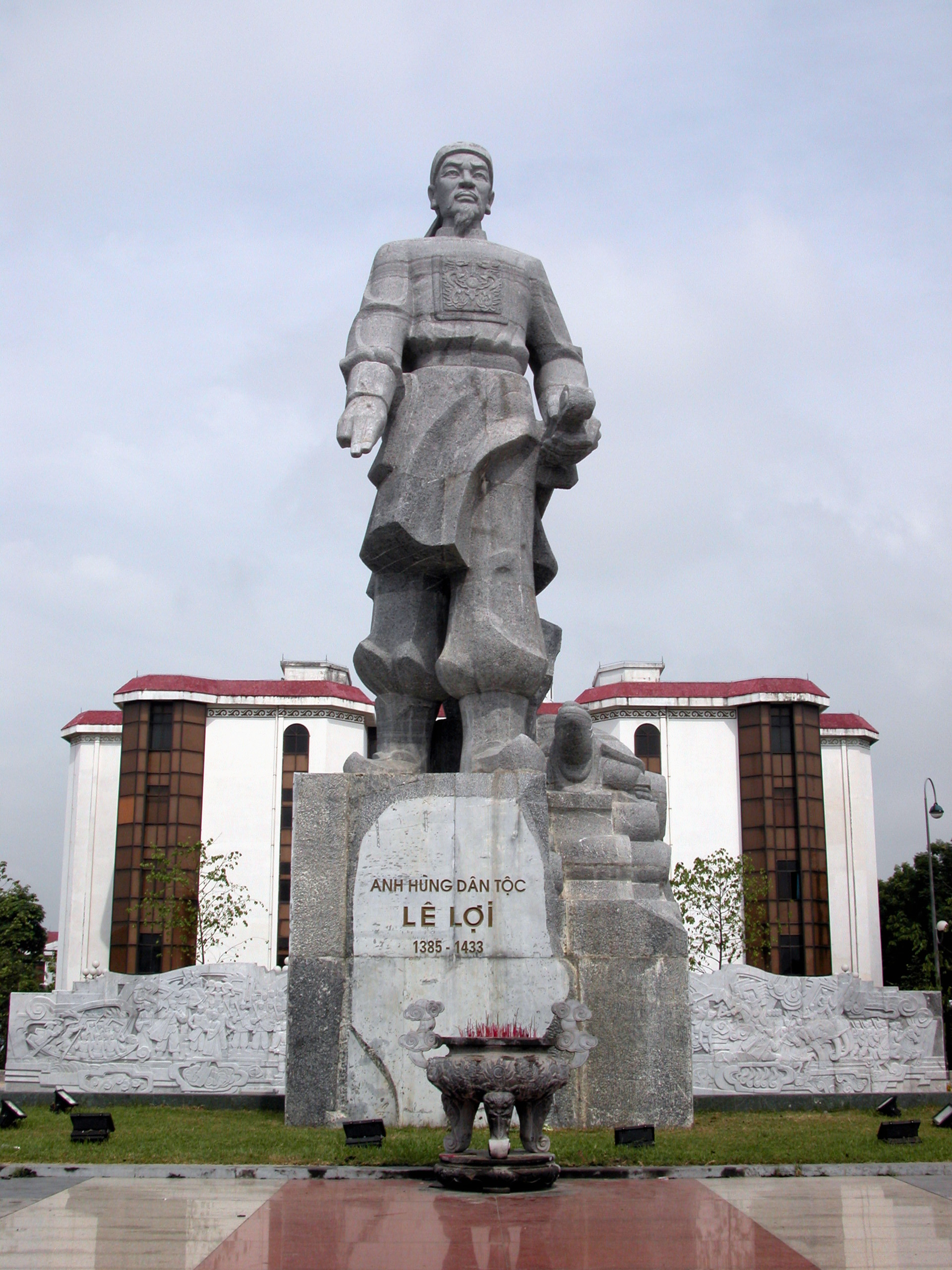
A statue of Lê Lợi and his sword in Thanh Hóa, Vietnam

One year after ascending the throne, Lê Lợi was on a dragon boat cruising around Hồ Lục Thủy (Green Water Lake), directly in front of his palace. When they came to the middle of the lake, a giant turtle with a golden shell (Kim Qui) emerged from under the water surface. Lê Lợi ordered the captain to slow down, and at the same time looked down to see that the magic sword on his belt was moving on its own. The golden turtle advanced toward the boat and the emperor, then with a human voice, it asked him to return the magic sword to his master, Long Vương (Dragon King), who lived under the water. It suddenly became clear to Lê Lợi that the sword was only lent to him to carry out his duty, but now it must be returned to its rightful owner, lest it corrupt him. Lê Lợi drew the sword out of its scabbard and lobbed it towards the turtle. With great speed, the turtle opened its mouth and snatched the sword from the air with its teeth. It descended back into the water, with the shiny sword in its mouth, and for a long period a flickering light was said to have been seen from beyond the muddled depths of the lake. From then on, people renamed that lake to Hồ Gươm (Sword Lake) or Hồ Hoàn Kiếm (Lake of the Returned Sword).

== Historical analysis ==
A few historians believe that the Thuận Thiên sword was an expedient of Lê Lợi's strategist Nguyễn Trãi, regarding it as a ploy to gain legitimacy for Lê Lợi to lead an uprising against the Chinese. The expedient was successful, as the sword's legend quickly spread across the country, leading the populace to regard Lê Lợi as the rightful ruler of Vietnam, especially among those with high levels of antipathy towards the Chinese, who were longstanding historical enemies of Vietnam.

== See also ==
- Sword of Victory – One of the Royal Regalia of Thailand
