= Quảng Ninh, Quảng Trị =

Coordinates: 17°23′23″N 106°39′41″E

Quảng Ninh
- Commune
- Interactive map of Quảng Ninh
- Country: Vietnam
- Province: Quảng Trị
- Time zone: UTC+07:00

Quảng Ninh is a commune in Quảng Trị Province, Vietnam. This is an agricultural commune.

On June 16, 2025, the Standing Committee of the National Assembly issued Resolution No. 1680/NQ-UBTVQH15 on the reorganization of commune-level administrative units in Quảng Trị Province in 2025. Accordingly, the entire natural area and population of Quán Hàu Township, Vĩnh Ninh Commune, Võ Ninh Commune, and Hàm Ninh Commune were reorganized to form a new commune named Quảng Ninh Commune.
