= Trường Ninh =

Coordinates: 17°18′00″N 106°39′38″E

- Commune and village
- Interactive map of Trường Ninh
- Country: Vietnam
- Province: Quảng Trị
- Time zone: UTC+07:00

Trường Ninh is a commune (xã) and village in Quảng Trị Province, Vietnam.

Trường Ninh was the birthplace of Monsignor Philippe Trần Văn Hoài.

On June 16, 2025, the Standing Committee of the National Assembly issued Resolution No. 1680/NQ-UBTVQH15 on the reorganization of commune-level administrative units in Quảng Trị Province in 2025. Accordingly, Vạn Ninh Commune, An Ninh Commune, Xuân Ninh Commune, and Hiền Ninh Commune were merged to form a new commune named Trường Ninh Commune.
