= May people =

Mày
Total population
- 1163 (2008)

Regions with significant populations
- Minh Hóa District, Quảng Bình province, Vietnam

Languages
- Mày, Bru, Vietnamese

Religion
- Animism, Shamanism, Theravada Buddhism

Related ethnic groups
- Rục, Mã Liềng, Arem, Muong

The Mày is a small ethnic group of Vietnam, indigenous to the mountains of Central Vietnamese province of Quảng Bình. In Vietnam, they are considered a sub-ethnic group of the Chứt. Only about 450 individuals still speak the May language, a distinct Vietic Cheut language.

== History and settlement ==
The endonym Mày and its origins are uncertain; according to the Mày it means "source of river, stream", though Paul Sidwell speculates that it is perhaps a xenonym of Austronesian origin. Early missionaries like Marius Maunier (1902) and Léopold Cadière (1905), due to limited contemporary knowledge, simply regarded the Mày as "des sauvages," (Moï or Rợ in Vietnamese). There is a possibility that the Mày were perhaps were the Kôy that Cadière described. Through ethnology expeditions in the late 1940s by Jeanne Cuisinier and Lucienne Delmas, the first comprehensive account of the Mày was documented.

Prior to the mid-20th century, the Mày had been nomadic hunter-gatherers in the wild Annamite mountains of western Quảng Bình like other Cheut groups. Their lifestyle included ancient hunting, foraging, and fishing techniques using primitive tools such as stone daggers, bone knives, and crossbows. They were known to occasionally use metal tools acquired from agricultural peoples such as axes. That changed in 1958 when the remaining nomadic Cheut tribes were discovered by North Vietnamese soldiers. Subsequently, the DRV government forcefully resettled the Mày in designated villages.

Today, the Mày live in sedentary settlements within 11 villages in a small junction of Dân Hóa commune, Minh Hóa District. Using conventional techniques, they grow maize, cassava, rice, and taro on hill paddy fields with crafted metal tools. They also breed chickens and pigs. However, small farming does not completely sustain Mày families; many Mày, especially the older generations, continue to hunt, forage, and fish.

The Mày dwell in stilt houses, with palm and banana leaf roofs, constructed with help from border guards. Their houses are often divided: one section for ancestor worship and guest, one for domestic space. Previously, Cheut groups could not weave fabric and clothes. In summer, Mày men wore loincloths and women wore skirts. In winter, they wrapped themselves with tree bark.

== May religion and traditions ==
Mày's belief system is a form of Animism blended with Laotian Buddhism. While the Mày worship many different gods, their most holy god is Ku Lôông, a legendary beast-god who gave birth to an egg. From that egg hatched three siblings: the eldest is May, the middleborn is Khua, and the youngest is Nguồn. According to their mythology, Ku Lôông taught the May how to make weapons, especially bows and poisoned arrows, helping the Mày fight off beasts and enemy tribes. Other gods recognized in May animism include the spirits of nature: the gods of the forest and rivers.

The Mày also retain a strong connection to the dead. They believe that the souls of their ancestors return to their villages. Through a shaman, the Mày can connect with spirits and ghosts. At the same time, they believe in reincarnation. Mày folklore has incorporated Buddhist traditions as well, claiming that the Buddha rules over the destinies of both humans and animals. The Buddha is typically portrayed accompanied by totem animals, usually an amphibian.

The Mày have preserved their traditional holidays. One important Mày holiday is Sileng, which takes place in the second half of July and is ritualized with sacrifices in honor of the water serpent Kulong-Tavok. Other holidays seem to be influenced by Vietnamese holidays, such as the Lunar New Year Festival.

== See also ==
- Arem people
- Nguồn people
