= Cha Lo Border Gate Economic Zone =

Special economic zone in Vietnam

Cha Lo Border Gate Economic Zone (Vietnamese: Khu kinh tế cửa khẩu Cha Lo) is a special economic zone in Quảng Bình Province, Vietnam. This zone is located at the border gate between Laos's Khammouane Province and Vietnam's Quảng Bình Province. Total area is 538 km^{2}, including 5 communes Dân Hoá, Hóa Thanh, Hóa Tiến, Hóa Phúc and Hồng Hoá. It's connected by road through National Road 12. Preferential investment and taxation are given to the investors and businessmen here.

The management organization of this special economic zone is the Management Unit for Quảng Bình Economic Zones.

== See also ==
- Hòn La Economic Zone
