= Quảng Lưu =

Quảng Lưu may refer to several places in Vietnam, including:

- Quảng Lưu, Quảng Bình, a rural commune of Quảng Trạch District.
- Quảng Lưu, Thanh Hóa, a rural commune of Quảng Xương District.
