= Quảng Hợp =

Quảng Hợp may refer to several places in Vietnam, including:

- Quảng Hợp, Quảng Bình, a rural commune of Quảng Trạch District.
- Quảng Hợp, Thanh Hóa, a rural commune of Quảng Xương District.
