= Quảng Phúc =

Quảng Phúc may refer to several places in Vietnam, including:

- Quảng Phúc, Quảng Bình, a ward of Ba Đồn.
- Quảng Phúc, Thanh Hóa, a rural commune of Quảng Xương District.
