= Quảng Trạch district =

District of Quảng Bình province, Vietnam

Coordinates: 17°47′4″N 106°23′50″E

Quảng Trạch district Huyện Quảng Trạch
- District
- Location within Vietnam Location within Southeast Asia Location within Asia
- Country: Vietnam
- Region: North Central Coast
- Province: Quảng Bình
- Established: December 20, 2013
- Capital: Quảng Phương

Government
  - People's Committee headquarters: Thôn Pháp Kệ, xã Quảng Phương

Area
  - Total: 174.02 sq mi (450.70 km^{2})

Population (2019)
  - Total: 110,380
  - Density: 640/sq mi (246/km^{2})
- Time zone: UTC+7
- Website: quangtrach.quangbinh.gov.vn

Quảng Trạch is a former district of Quảng Bình province in the North Central Coast of Vietnam.

The Hòn La Economic Zone is located in this district. Hòn La has a capacity for vessels up to 10,000 metric tons, and may handle up to 12 million metric tons at full capacity. A coal-fueled thermoelectric plant with a total designed capacity of 2,400 MW was built by Petrovietnam in 2009.

As of 2013 the district had a population of 95,542. The district covers an area of 450.70 km^{2} (174.02 sq mi). The district capital lies at Quảng Phương.

== Subdivisions ==
Quảng Trạch district is subdivided into 18 rural communes, including Quảng Phương (district capital), Cảnh Dương, Cảnh Hóa, Liên Trường, Phù Hóa, Quảng Châu, Quảng Đông, Quảng Hợp, Quảng Hưng, Quảng Kim, Quảng Lưu, Quảng Phú, Quảng Thạch, Quảng Thanh, Quảng Tiến, Quảng Tùng and Quảng Xuân.

Before 2013, the district capital was Ba Đồn township. However, on December 20, 2013, Ba Đồn township and the rural communes of Quảng Hải, Quảng Hòa, Quảng Lộc, Quảng Long, Quảng Minh, Quảng Phong, Quảng Phúc, Quảng Sơn, Quảng Tân, Quảng Thọ, Quảng Thuận, Quảng Thủy, Quảng Tiên, Quảng Trung and Quảng Văn were separated from the district to form the new district-level town of Ba Đồn.

Trần Nhân Tông founded the Tri Kien temple in present-day Bố Trạch district.
