= Quảng Đông =

Quảng Đông may refer to several places in Vietnam, including:

- Quảng Đông, Thanh Hóa, a rural commune of Thanh Hóa city.
- Quảng Đông, Quảng Bình, a rural commune of Quảng Trạch District.

== See also ==
- Guangdong (Vietnamese: Quảng Đông)
