= Minh Hóa district =

Coordinates: 17.750°N 105.917°E

Minh Hóa district Huyện Minh Hóa
- District
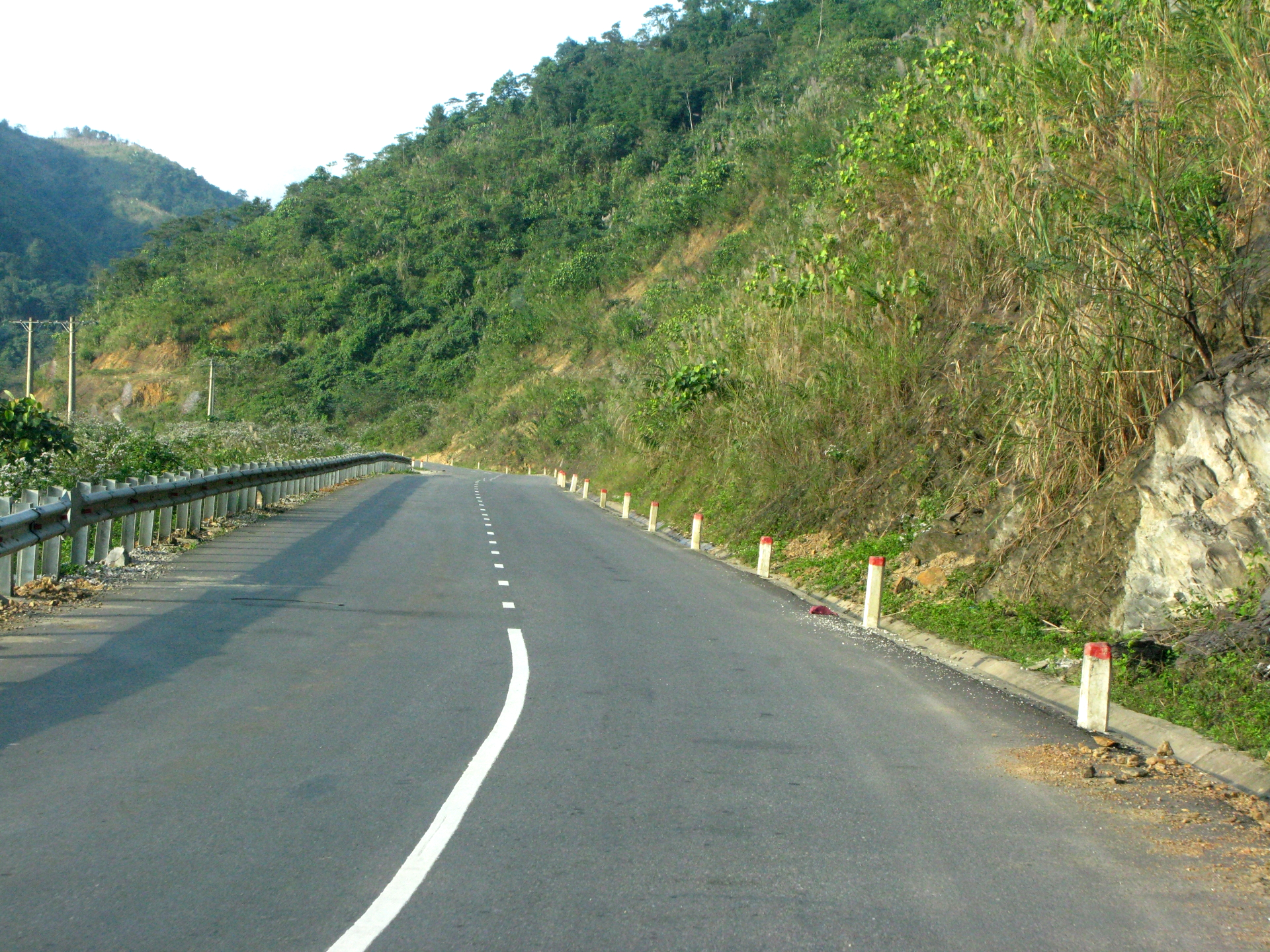
- National highway #12A in Minh Hóa District, Quảng Bình Province
- Interactive map of Minh Hóa district
- Country: Vietnam
- Region: North Central Coast
- Province: Quảng Bình
- Capital: Quy Đạt

Area
  - Total: 541 sq mi (1,401 km^{2})

Population (2017)
  - Total: 50,708
- Time zone: UTC+7 (Indochina Time)

Minh Hóa is a former district in Quảng Bình province, in the North Central Coast region of Vietnam. This district is composed of one townlet (Quy Đạt, district capital) and 15 communes (xã): Xuân Hóa, Yên Hóa, Trung Hóa, Tân Hóa, Minh Hóa, Hồng Hóa, Hóa Tiến, Hóa Hợp, Hóa Sơn, Hóa Phúc, Hóa Thanh, Dân Hóa, Thượng Hóa, Trọng Hóa and Quy Hóa.

As of 2017 the district had a population of 50,708. The district covers an area of 1,401 km^{2} (541 sq mi). The district capital lies at Quy Đạt.
