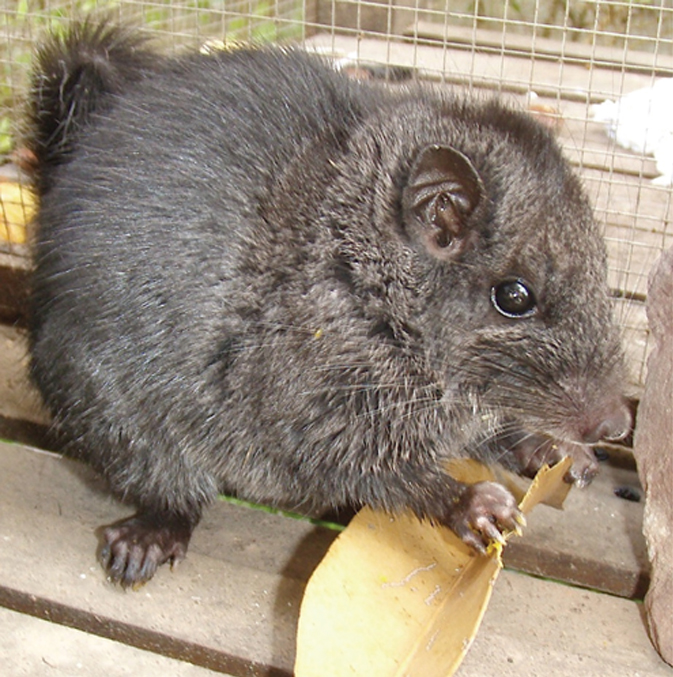
- Young male

Conservation status
- Least Concern (IUCN 3.1)

Scientific classification
- Kingdom: Animalia
- Phylum: Chordata
- Class: Mammalia
- Order: Rodentia
- Family: Diatomyidae
- Genus: Laonastes; Jenkins, Kilpatrick, Robinson & Timmins, 2005
- Species: L. aenigmamus

Binomial name
- Laonastes aenigmamus Jenkins, Kilpatrick, Robinson & Timmins, 2005
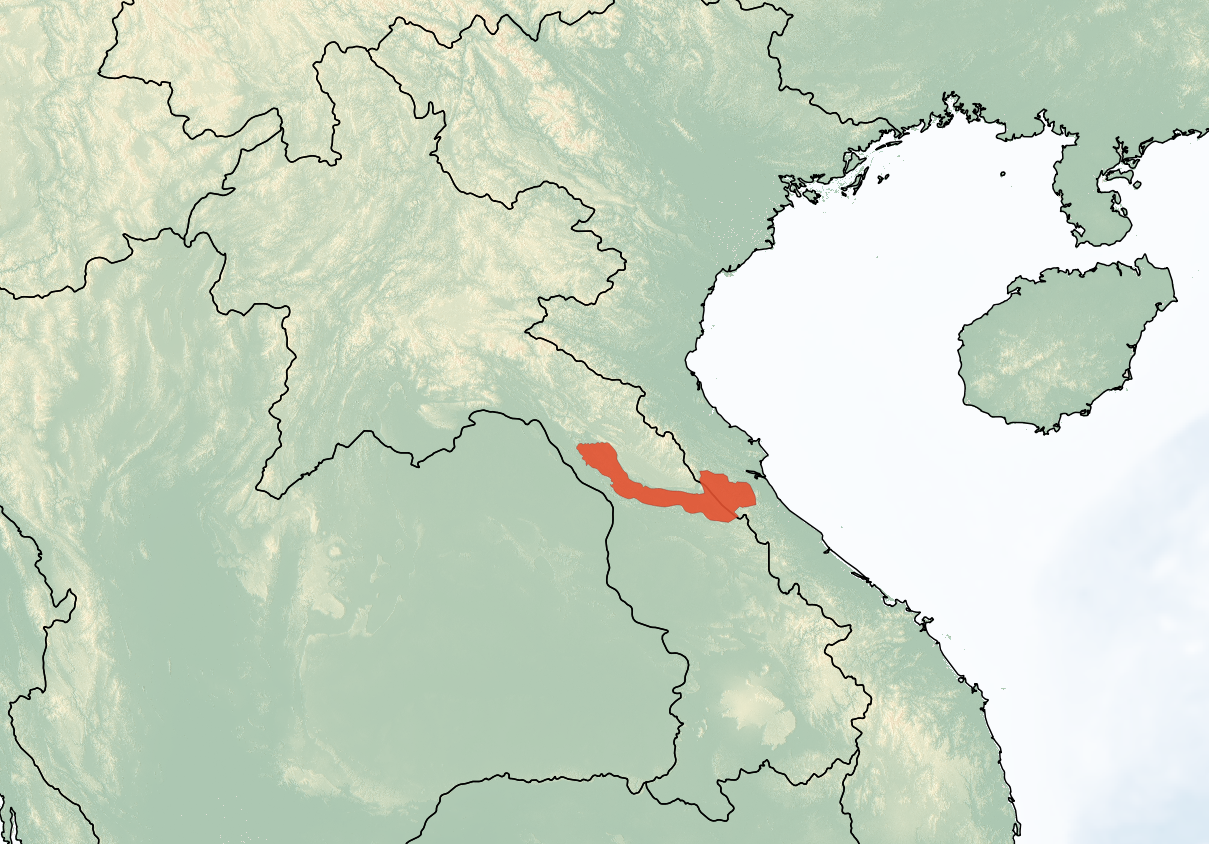

= Laotian rock rat =

Species of rodent found in central Laos

The Laotian rock rat or kha-nyou (Laonastes aenigmamus, Lao: ຂະຍຸ), sometimes called the "rat-squirrel", is a species of rodent found in the Khammouan region of Laos. The species was first described in a 2005 article by Paulina Jenkins and coauthors, who considered the animal to be so distinct from all living rodents, they placed it in a new family, Laonastidae. It is in the monotypic genus Laonastes.

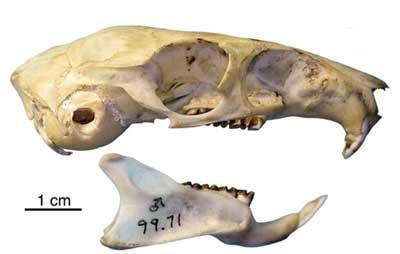
Skull of L. aenigmamus

In 2006, the classification of the Laotian rock rat was disputed by Mary Dawson and coauthors. They suggested the rat belongs to the ancient fossil family Diatomyidae, which was thought to have been extinct for 11 million years, since the late Miocene. It would thereby represent a Lazarus species. The animals resemble large, dark rats with hairy, thick tails like those of a squirrel. Their skulls are very distinctive and have features that separate them from all other living mammals.

== Classification ==
Upon their initial discovery, Jenkins and coauthors (2005) considered the Laotian rock rat to represent a completely new family. The discovery of a new species of an extant mammal genus, or a new genus, happens periodically, such as with the leaf muntjac or the saola. The discovery of a completely new family is, by comparison, much more unusual. The most recent comparable incident before this discovery by Western science was the discovery of the bumblebee bat (Craseonycteris thonglongyai; family Craseonycteridae) in 1974. The only other examples from the 20th century are species that are only considered distinct families by a few authorities. These discoveries are: the Chinese river dolphin (Lipotes vexillifer; family Lipotidae) in 1918, the Zagros mouse-like hamster (Calomyscus bailwardi; family Calomyscidae) in 1905, and Goeldi's marmoset (Callimico goeldii; family Callimiconidae) in 1904. Representatives from all the remaining rodent families with living representatives (approximately 30) were discovered before 1900.

Jenkins et al. did not compare the specimens to known rodent fossils. After such a comparison, Dawson et al. believed the Laotian rock rat belongs to a previously described family, which had only been known from fossils, the Diatomyidae, so not a new family, but simply one that had been believed extinct. The Diatomyidae are known from a series of fossils from the early Oligocene (~32.5 mya) until the Miocene (~11 mya). The discovery of the Laotian rock rat means an 11 million-year gap exists in the fossil record, in which no diatomyids have been found. Dawson et al. described the Diatomyidae as a Lazarus taxon due to this gap. The only other mammal Lazarus taxon with a comparable time gap between it and its most recently known fossil relative is the monito del monte, which is part of a marsupial family (Microbiotheriidae) also most recently known from Miocene deposits. Mary Dawson described Laonastes as the "coelacanth of rodents".

The analysis of mtDNA 12S rRNA and cytochrome b sequence by Jenkins et al. allied Laonastes with African hystricognath rodents, namely the blesmols and the dassie rat. Support for such a placement was fair, but the exact position could not be resolved. Huchon et al. conducted a large-scale molecular phylogeny of rodents, including representatives of all major rodent taxonomic groups, based on 5.5 kb of sequence data from four nuclear and two mitochondrial genes, and a short, interspersed element, insertion analysis including 11 informative loci. Their molecular data place Laonastes robustly as a sister clade of Ctenodactylidae, and support an ancient divergence during the Lutetian (Early/Middle Eocene, ~44 mya). The earlier molecular study was in error due to long branch attraction and inadequate sampling.

== Etymology ==
The genus name for this animal, Laonastes, means "inhabitant of stone" (from Greek λαας = laas = stone, gen: λαος = laos = of stone and Greek ναστης = nastes = inhabitant). This is in reference to its presence around limestone rocks and also to the country where it was recently discovered. The specific epithet aenigmamus means "enigma mouse" (from Greek αινιγμα = ænigma and μυς = mus, "mouse") referring to its unknown position among the rodents (Jenkins et al., 2004).

== Discovery ==
The first specimens were found for sale as meat at a market in Thakhek, Khammouan, in 1996 by biologist Robert Timmins. Remains of three additional animals were obtained in 1998 from villagers and in an owl pellet. Return trips to Laos by the Wildlife Conservation Society researchers uncovered several other specimens. These new discoveries have prompted the suggestion that the animals may not be as rare as once thought. On June 13, 2006, David Redfield, a professor emeritus of Florida State University, and Thai wildlife biologist Uthai Treesucon announced they had captured, photographed, and videotaped a live specimen of the species in the village of Doy in Laos.

== Description ==
The animals look generally like rats, with thick, furred tails similar to a squirrel's, but limp. The head is large, with round ears and a somewhat bulbous bridge of the nose, and very long whiskers. Their fur is dark slate grey, with a blackish tail. The belly is lighter, with a small, whitish area in the center. Their eyes are beady and black. They are about 26 cm (10 in) long with a 14 cm (5.5 in) tail and weigh about 400 g (14 oz). Jenkins et al. (2004) described the jaw as hystricognathous, but Dawson et al. argued it is sciurognathous. The infraorbital foramen is enlarged, consistent with a hystricomorphous zygomasseteric system. The pterygoid fossae do not connect to the orbit, setting them apart from the hystricognathous rodents.

== Distribution ==
The Laotian Rock rat is found in limestone karsts of Khammouan Province and southern Bolikhamxai Province, Laos, and also in a small area of Minh Hóa District, western Quảng Bình Province, Vietnam. In Vietnam, it is found in the 5 communes (xã) of Thượng Hoá, Hóa Sơn, Trung Hoá, Hóa Hợp, and Dân Hoá, and in Phong Nha – Kẻ Bàng National Park, near the villages of the Vietic-speaking Ruc, Sach, and Chut ethnic groups. It is also found directly across the border in Hin Namno National Biodiversity Conservation Area, Laos. In Laos, it is most common in the Phou Hin Poun National Biodiversity Conservation Area. Nguyen et al. suggested that the Quảng Bình and Phou Hin Poun populations may be distinct and genetically isolated from each other.

Nicolas et al. found 8 major geographical clades and 8 to 16 evolutionary significant units among Laotian rock rat populations in Laos, and suggested that Laonastes may in fact consist of various undescribed cryptic species.

== Natural history ==
Laotian rock rats are found in regions of karst limestone. They appear to be found only among limestone boulders on hillsides. Villagers in the area are familiar with the animal, calling it kha-nyou, and trapping it for food. The animals are presumed to be nocturnal.

These rock rats appear to be predominantly herbivores, eating leaves, grass, and seeds. They may eat insects, as well, but probably not in high abundance. Females may give birth to a single young.

Laotian rock rats appear to be quite docile and slow-moving over open ground. They walk with feet splayed outward in a gait described as duck-like. Although not ideal for mobility on open surfaces, this appears to be efficient when scrambling up and across large rocks. The sideways angle allows for greater surface area for their feet to find purchase on tilted or parallel surfaces.

== See also ==
- Living fossil
