= Quảng Tiến =

Quảng Tiến may refer to several places in Vietnam, including:

- Quảng Tiến, Thanh Hóa, a ward of Sầm Sơn.
- Quảng Tiến, Đắk Lắk, a rural commune of Cư M'gar District.
- Quảng Tiến, Đồng Nai, a rural commune of Trảng Bom District.
- Quảng Tiến, Quảng Bình, a rural commune of Quảng Trạch District.
