= Quảng Thọ =

Quảng Thọ may refer to several places in Vietnam, including:

- Quảng Thọ, Thanh Hóa, a ward of Sầm Sơn.
- Quảng Thọ, Quảng Bình, a ward of Ba Đồn.
- Quảng Thọ, Thừa Thiên-Huế, a rural commune of Quảng Điền District.
