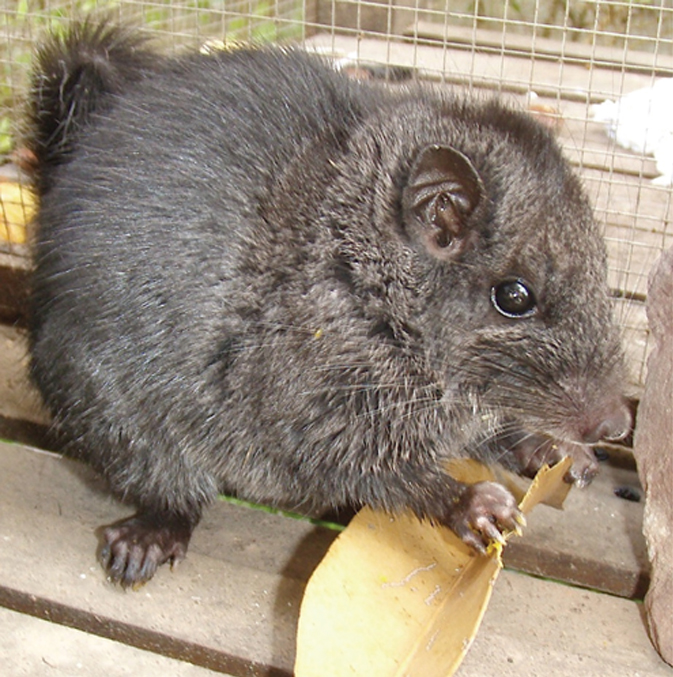
- Young male Laotian rock rat, Laonastes aenigmamus

Scientific classification
- Kingdom: Animalia
- Phylum: Chordata
- Class: Mammalia
- Order: Rodentia
- Suborder: Hystricomorpha
- Superfamily: Ctenodactyloidea
- Family: Diatomyidae; Mein & Ginsburg, 1997

Type genus
- Diatomys Li, 1974

Genera
- Laonastes †Diatomys †Fallomus †Marymus †Willmus †Inopinatia †? Pierremus

Synonyms
- Laonastidae Jenkins et al. 2005

= Diatomyidae =

Diatomyidae Temporal range: Early Oligocene – Recent 32.5–0 Ma

Family of rodents

Diatomyidae is a family of hystricomorph rodents. It is represented by a single living species, Laonastes aenigmamus, native to Laos in Southeast Asia. Fossil species are known from the Oligocene and Miocene of Asia and eastern Europe.

== "Lazarus effect" ==
Before Laonastes was discovered, the family Diatomyidae was known only from fossils. The family has a nearly continuous fossil range from Early Oligocene fossils of Fallomus from the Lower Chitarwata Formation (32.5 million years ago, Bugti Member, Bugti Hills,) in Balochistan, Pakistan, to Middle/Late Miocene fossils (11 Mya) of Diatomys.

Jenkins et al. reported the discovery of a wholly unique new species of rodent, Laonastes aenigmamus, for which they created a new family, Laonastidae. They suggested it was a hystricognath rodent, but basal to all other hystricognaths. Dawson, et al, re-evaluated the phylogenetic position of Laonastes based on morphology and included fossil taxa in their analysis. They determined Laonastes is actually sciurognathous and belongs to the Diatomyidae. They also described the Diatomyidae as a Lazarus taxon due to the 11-million-year gap between the most recent diatomyid in the fossil record and the existence of Laonastes today. The only other comparable length of time for a mammal Lazarus taxon is the monito del monte, which is part of a family (Microbiotheriidae), also most recently known from Miocene deposits. Mary Dawson described Laonastes as the "coelacanth of rodents".

== Characteristics ==
The Diatomyidae are similar to both the Ctenodactylidae and the Anomaluromorpha in being simultaneously hystricomorphous and sciurognathous. The masseteric fossa in diatomyids is enlarged and extends to below the first cheek tooth. The enamel on incisors is multiserial (similar to the springhare, gundis, and Hystricognathi). The single premolar on both the upper and lower tooth rows is enlarged (unlike the reduced state in Ctenodactylidae). Most diatomyids have cheek teeth with four roots except for the first. In Laonastes, the lower molars have four roots, but upper cheek teeth have three roots including a U-shaped anterior root that may be derived from the merging of two roots.

Living diatomyids are only represented by the Laotian rock rat from the Khammouan region of Laos. Fossil diatomyids have been recovered in Pakistan, India, Thailand, China, Japan, and Serbia.

== Relationship to other rodents ==
The uniqueness of the Laotian rock rat was clear upon its initial discovery. The results of the phylogenetic analyses were somewhat inconclusive and contradictory. Both morphological and molecular studies suggested Laonastes is a member of the rodent suborder Hystricognathi. The morphological analysis suggested it is the most basal hystricognath. Fossil taxa were not included in the morphological analysis.

Analysis of mtDNA 12S rRNA and cytochrome b sequence, however, suggested Laonastes might be related to living African hystricognaths such as the dassie rat and the naked mole rat. Another type of analysis on the cytochrome b sequence data produced the same result as morphology. Neither analysis, however, showed entirely robust statistical support for the position of Laonastes within the hystricognaths; altogether, it appeared to belong among the basal African radiation.

Dawson et al. also refuted the notion that Laonastes is a hystricognath and instead argued that the mandible is sciurognathous. They evaluated Laonastes in comparison to several fossil rodents and determined it is closely related to the diatomyids, particularly Diatomys. Their results suggested the Diatomyidae are a sister group to the Ctenodactylidae, and this diatomyid/ctenodactylid clade (along with the Yuomyidae) is sister to the Hystricognathi.

Besides Laonastes, other diatomyids have also been placed in different families. Some placed Diatomys in the family Pedetidae (springhares). Others considered Fallomus to belong to the Chapattimyidae (a completely fossil group). The family Diatomyidae was erected and considered to be a member of the superfamily Ctenodactyloidea. Marivaux et al. united the two into a single family (Diatomyidae), but also suggested this family might be related to the Pedetidae.

Dawson's fossil study was corroborated by more comprehensive DNA sequence analyses, which suggested a roughly Lutetian (about 44 Mya, Early/Middle Eocene) divergence date between the ancestors of the Laotian rock rat and the African gundis, which are each other's closest living relatives. Considering the present-day distribution, the fossil record, and Eocene paleogeography, this divergence probably took place in one of three regions. Either the lineages split in Eurasia, somewhere in today's Zagros Mountains or adjacent ranges of the Alpide belt. These at that time formed a rugged and broken coastline with many offshore islands, as they emerged from the shrinking Tethys Sea. Alternatively, the entire Ctenodactyloidea might be of African origin, or the lineage split took place on India as it joined the Asian mainland, with the gundis reaching Africa via the Mascarene Plateau's archipelagos and island continents. Each hypothesis would unite the paleontological, anatomical, and molecular findings into a robust model. Which one is preferred depends on whether the Hystricomorpha were Laurasian or Gondwanan in origin.

== Species ==
- †Fallomus
  - †Fallomus razae
  - †Fallomus ginsburgi
  - †Fallomus quraishyi
- †Diatomys
  - †Diatomys shantungensis
  - †Diatomys liensis
  - †Diatomys chitaparwalensis
- †Marymus
  - †Marymus dalanae
- †Pierremus
  - †Pierremus explorator
  - †Pierremus ladakhensis
- †Willmus
  - †Willmus maximus
- †Inopinatia
  - †Inopinatia balkanica
- Laonastes
  - Laonastes aenigmamus - Laotian rock rat
