= Storchipedetes =

Storchipedetes Temporal range: Tortonian

Scientific classification
- Kingdom: Animalia
- Phylum: Chordata
- Class: Mammalia
- Infraclass: Placentalia
- Order: Rodentia
- Family: Pedetidae
- Genus: †Storchipedetes; Fazal et al., 2025
- Species: †S. afroasiaticus

Binomial name
- †Storchipedetes afroasiaticus Fazal et al., 2025

Extinct genus of springhare

Storchipedetes is an extinct genus of pedetid rodent that lived during the Tortonian stage of the Miocene epoch in Yunnan, China.

== Palaeoecology ==
It is believed based on the morphology of the species that Storchipedetes afroasiaticus had a preference for more closed habitats compared to other springhares.
