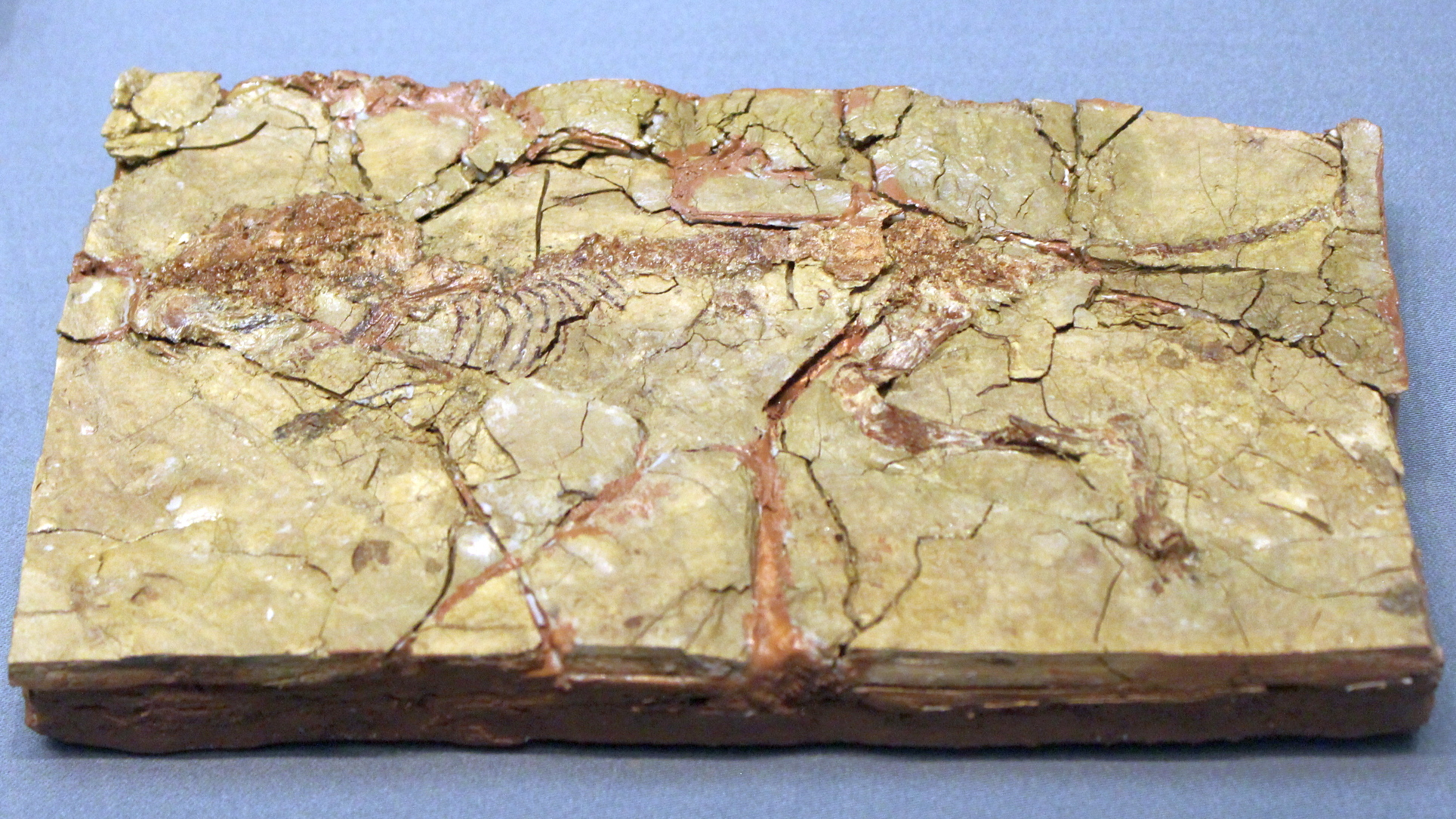
- Fossil specimen, Tianjin Natural History Museum

Scientific classification
- Domain: Eukaryota
- Kingdom: Animalia
- Phylum: Chordata
- Class: Mammalia
- Order: Rodentia
- Family: Diatomyidae
- Genus: †Diatomys; Li, 1974

Type species
- †Diatomys shantungensis Li, 1974

Species
- D. shantungensisLi, 1974; D. liensisMein & Ginsburg, 1985; D. chitaparwalensisFlynn, 2006

= Diatomys =

Diatomys Temporal range: Early Miocene – Middle Miocene

Extinct genus of rodents

Diatomys is an extinct rodent genus known from Miocene deposits in China, Japan, Pakistan, and Thailand. The fossil range is from the late Early Miocene to the Middle Miocene (22.5–11 Ma).

== Specimens ==
Specifically the strata and regions from which Diatomys has been collected are: Shanwang series in Shandong province, China, Jiangsu province in China, Kyūshū in Japan, the Siwaliks in northern Pakistan, and Li Basin in Lamphun Province, Thailand.

Li (1974) described Diatomys shantungensis on the basis of two moderately complete specimens from Shandong. This material had good preservation of dental characters, but much of the skull was difficult to interpret due to flattening. Dawson et al. (2006) reported the finding of another D. shantungensis fossil from Shandong that showed much improved preservation of cranial and skeletal characters. Impressions of hair and whiskers were observable in the specimen.

Mein and Ginsburg (1985) described Diatomys liensis from Thailand, and considered it distinct enough to warrant recognition as separate from D. shantungensis. D. liensis was found to be smaller overall, with a higher molar crown height and distinctions in cusp morphology in the premolar and first molar.

== Characteristics ==
Head and body was about 25 cm (9.8 in). The overall appearance of Diatomys was thought to be very similar to the extant Laotian rock rat.

The dental formula for Diatomys is 1.0.1.31.0.1.3 × 2 = 20. Incisors display multiserial enamel. The structure of the Hunter-Schreger bands is very similar to Laonastes. The root of the incisor is shortened. The cheek teeth are bilophodont, displaying two transverse ridges that are each slightly curved into a mild horseshoe shape. Cheek teeth have four roots on both the upper and lower jaws.

The infraorbital canal is enlarged, presumably allowing for the passage of the medial masseter muscle as with other hystricomorphs. The mandible is sciurognathous. As with other diatomyids, Diatomys has no coronoid process and the masseteric fossa extends far forward to below the fourth premolar.

The postcranial skeleton does not appear to have any unique specializations that might be associated with a fossorial, arboreal, or saltatorial way of life. This has led researchers to assume Diatomys was terrestrial.

== Relationship ==
Several authors have suggested that Diatomys might belong to the family Pedetidae (McKenna and Bell, 1997) or be related to the pedetids (Mein and Ginsburg, 1997; Marivaux et al., 2004). Li (1974) also noted the possibility that it was related to geomyoids based on the bilophodont tooth. Dawson et al. (2006) determined that the closest known relative of Diatomys is the extant Laotian rock rat, a unique rodent first described in 2005 (Jenkins et al., 2004) from Khammouan, Laos. The remaining diatomyid in their analysis, Fallomus, was determined to be more distant.
