= Arem people =

Arem Umo Chmbrau
Total population
- ~500–800 (2021)

Regions with significant populations
- Tân Trạch, Bố Trạch District, Quảng Bình Province, Vietnam; Boualapha District, Khammouan Province, Laos

Languages
- Arem, Bru

Religion
- Animism, Shamanism

Related ethnic groups
- Rục, Mã Liềng, Mày

The Arem is a small, unreached, and endangered Vietic-speaking ethnic group of Vietnam and Lao PDR, native people of the mountains of Central Vietnamese province of Quảng Bình and neighboring Khammouan province of Laos. Their alternate autonyms are Umo, Chmbrau or Chmrau, which are Katuic expressions for "hunter-gatherers." In Vietnam, they are considered a sub-ethnic group of the Chứt.

Prior to 1956, the Arem were truly nomadic hunters and gatherers. In the past they preferred to move around deep within the forests-mountains, dwelling in caves, trees, or temporary shacks, whole life depended on hunting, foraging, fishing. They and the Rục were the last Chuet groups to start building sedentary houses in the 1960s. Nowadays, a group of 156 Arem is living in a humble village, coded name No.39, located in Tân Trạch, Bố Trạch District, Quảng Bình province, a village that is dominantly Bru Ma Coong who outnumber the Arem, and thus Ma Coong is used by the Arem at the village as daily lingua franca communicating language. Another, yet to be confirmed 250 Arem, are dwelling in the Laotian side of the Annamite mountains.

It is estimated that the current Arem population is around 800 people. According to Vietnamese government reports, the population of the Arem is falling drastically, and many are heading back to their original nomadic lifestyle. Today, among several hundred Arem, only 20 (Babaev-Samarina 2018) to 100 (UNESCO 2011) of them could still speak their own Arem language, which is poorly researched and mostly spoken by the elderly. The Arem are not willing to share their language and tend to speak other groups' languages. Arem is one of the world's critically endangered languages at risk of extinction.

== See also ==
- May people
- Rục people
