= List of ethnic groups in Vietnam =

Fifty-four ethnic groups in Vietnam have been officially recognized by the Vietnamese government since 2 March 1979. Each ethnicity has its own unique language, traditions, and culture. The largest ethnic groups are: Kinh (Viet) 85.32%, Tày 1.92%, Thái 1.89%, Mường 1.51%, Hmong 1.45%, Khmer 1.32%, Nùng 1.13%, Dao 0.93%, Hoa 0.78%, with all others accounting for the remaining 3.7% (2019 census). The Vietnamese terms for ethnicity are dân tộc and sắc tộc.

== List of ethnic groups ==
The total population of Vietnam was 96,208,984 according to the 2019 census.

Group	People	Percentage of population	2009 census	2019 census	Growth rate (per year)	Distribution (2019 Census)	Note
	Total		85,846,997	96,208,984	1.14%		
1. Vietic	Kinh	85.32%	73,594,427	82,085,826	1.09%	Throughout Vietnam	Also called Viet, the largest ethnic group in Vietnam.
1. Vietic	Chứt	0.01%	6,022	7,513	2.21%	Quảng Bình (6,572 people, constituting 87.5% of all Chứt in Vietnam)	Chứt consists of five distinct tribes: Arem, Mã Liêng, Mày, Rục, Sách.
1. Vietic	Mường	1.51%	1,268,963	1,452,095	1.35%	Hòa Bình (549,026 people, constituting 64.28% of the province's population), Thanh Hóa (376,340 people, constituting 10.34% of the province's population), Phú Thọ (218,404 people, constituting 14.92% of the province's population), Sơn La (84,676 people, constituting 6.78% of the province's population), Hà Nội (62,239 people), Ninh Bình (27,345 people)	Closest to the Kinh, the other main part of the Viet–Mường branch of the Vietic subfamily.
1. Vietic	Thổ	0.1%	74,458	91,430	2.05%	Nghệ An (71,420 people, constituting 78.11% of all Thổ in Vietnam), Thanh Hóa (11,470 people, constituting 12.55% of all Thổ in Vietnam)	Thom, related to Kinh Vietnamese.
2. Austroasiatic (non-Vietic)	Ba Na	0.3%	227,716	286,910	2.31%	Gia Lai (189,367 people, constituting 12.51% of the province's population and 66.00% of all Ba Na in Vietnam), Kon Tum (68,799 people, constituting 12.73% of the province's population and 23.98% of all Ba Na in Vietnam), Bình Định (21,650 people, constituting 1.46% of the province's population and 7.55% of all Ba Na in Vietnam)	Bahnar
2. Austroasiatic (non-Vietic)	Brâu	<0.005%	397	525	2.79%	Kon Tum (497 people, constituting 94.67% of all Brâu in Vietnam), Hồ Chí Minh City (8 people), Đồng Nai (4 people)	Brau
2. Austroasiatic (non-Vietic)	Bru Vân Kiều	0.1%	74,506	94,598	2.39%	Quảng Trị (69,785 people, constituting 73.77% of all Bru Vân Kiều in Vietnam), Quảng Bình (18,575 people, constituting 19.64% of all Bru Vân Kiều in Vietnam), Đăk Lăk (3,563 people)	Bru
2. Austroasiatic (non-Vietic)	Chơ Ro	0.03%	26,855	29,520	0.95%	Đồng Nai (16,738 people, constituting 56.70% of all Chơ Ro in Vietnam), Bà Rịa-Vũng Tàu (8,079 people), Bình Thuận (3,777 people)	
2. Austroasiatic (non-Vietic)	Co	0.04%	33,817	40,442	1.79%	Quảng Ngãi (33,227 people, constituting 82.16% of all Co), Quảng Nam (6,479 people)	
2. Austroasiatic (non-Vietic)	Cờ Ho	0.21%	166,112	200,800	1.9%	Lâm Đồng (175,531 people, constituting 13.53% of the province's population and 87.42% of all Cơ Ho in Vietnam), Bình Thuận (13,531 people, 6.74% of all Cơ Ho in Vietnam)	Koho
2. Austroasiatic (non-Vietic)	Cơ Tu	0.08%	61,588	74,173	1.86%	Quảng Nam (55,091 people, constituting 74.27% of all Cơ Tu in Vietnam), Thừa Thiên-Huế (16,719 people, constituting 22.54% of all Cơ Tu in Vietnam)	
2. Austroasiatic (non-Vietic)	Giẻ Triêng	0.07%	50,962	63,322	2.17%	Kon Tum (39,515 people, constituting 62.40% of all Giẻ Triêng in Vietnam), Quảng Nam (23,222 people, constituting 36.67% of all Giẻ Triêng in Vietnam)	
2. Austroasiatic (non-Vietic)	Hrê	0.16%	127,420	149,460	1.6%	Quảng Ngãi (133,103 people, constituting 89.06% of all Hrê in Vietnam), Bình Định (11,112 people, 7.43% of all Hrê in Vietnam)	H're
2. Austroasiatic (non-Vietic)	Kháng	0.02%	13,840	16,180	1.56%	Sơn La (9,830 people, constituting 60.75% of all Kháng in Vietnam), Điện Biên (5,224 people, constituting 32.29% of all Kháng in Vietnam)	
2. Austroasiatic (non-Vietic)	Khmer	1.37%	1,260,640	1,319,652	0.46%	Sóc Trăng (362,029 people, constituting 30.18% of the province's population and 27.43% of all Khmer in Vietnam), Trà Vinh (318,231 people, constituting 31.53% of the province's population and 24.11% of all Khmer in Vietnam), Kiên Giang (211,282 people, constituting 12.26% of the province's population and 16.01% of all Khmer in Vietnam), An Giang (75,878 people), Bạc Liêu (73,968 people), Bình Dương (65,233 people), Hồ Chí Minh City (50,422 people), Cà Mau (26,110 people), Đồng Nai (23,560 people), Vĩnh Long (22,630 people) each constituting less than 10% of all Khmer in Vietnam	Khmer
2. Austroasiatic (non-Vietic)	Khơ Mú	0.09%	72,929	90,612	2.17%	Nghệ An (43,139 people, constituting 47.61% of all Khơ Mú in Vietnam), Điện Biên (19,785 people, constituting 21.83% of all Khơ Mú in Vietnam), Sơn La (15,783 people), Lai Châu (7,778 people), Yên Bái (1,539 people)	Khmu
2. Austroasiatic (non-Vietic)	Mạ	0.05%	41,405	50,322	1.95%	Lâm Đồng (38,523 people, constituting 76.55% of all Mạ in Vietnam), Đắk Nông (8,087 people), Đồng Nai (2,695 people)	
2. Austroasiatic (non-Vietic)	Mảng	<0.005%	3,700	4,650	2.29%	Lai Châu (4,501 people, constituting 96.78% of all Mảng in Vietnam)	
2. Austroasiatic (non-Vietic)	Mnông	0.13%	102,741	127,334	2.15%	Đăk Nông (50,718 people, constituting 39.83% of all M’Nông in Vietnam), Đăk Lăk (48,505 people, constituting 38.09% of all M’Nông in Vietnam), Bình Phước (10,879 people), Lâm Đồng (10,517 people)	Mnong
2. Austroasiatic (non-Vietic)	Ơ Đu	<0.005%	376	428	1.3%	Nghệ An (411 people, constituting 96.03% of all Ơ Đu in Vietnam)	
2. Austroasiatic (non-Vietic)	Rơ Măm	<0.005%	436	639	3.82%	Kon Tum (577 people, constituting 90.30% of all Rơ Măm in Vietnam)	
2. Austroasiatic (non-Vietic)	Tà Ôi	0.05%	43,886	52,356	1.76%	Thừa Thiên-Huế (34,967 people, constituting 66.79% of all Tà Ôi in Vietnam), Quảng Trị (16,446 people, constituting 31.41% of all Tà Ôi in Vietnam)	Ta Oi
2. Austroasiatic (non-Vietic)	Xinh Mun	0.03%	23,278	29,503	2.37%	Sơn La (27,031 people, constituting 91.62% of all Xinh Mun in Vietnam), Điện Biên (2,285 people)	Xinh-mun
2. Austroasiatic (non-Vietic)	Xơ Đăng	0.22%	169,501	212,277	2.25%	Kon Tum (133,117 people, constituting 24.63% of the province's population and 62.71% of all Xơ Đăng in Vietnam), Quảng Nam (47,268 people, constituting 22.27% of all Xơ Đăng in Vietnam), Quảng Ngãi (19,690 people), Đắk Lắk (9,818 people)	Sedang, Xo Dang
2. Austroasiatic (non-Vietic)	X’Tiêng	0.1%	85,436	100,752	1.65%	Bình Phước (96,649 people, constituting 95.93% of all Xtiêng in Vietnam)	Stieng
3. Tai–Kadai, Tai	Bố Y	<0.005%	2,273	3,232	3.52%	Lào Cai (1,925 people, constituting 59.56% of all Bố Y in Vietnam), Hà Giang (1,161 people, constituting 35.93% of all Bố Y in Vietnam)	Bouyei
3. Tai–Kadai, Tai	Giáy	0.07%	58,617	67,858	1.46%	Lào Cai (33,119 people, constituting 48.81% of all Giáy in Vietnam), Hà Giang (17,392 people, constituting 25.63% of all Giáy in Vietnam), Lai Châu (12,932 people, constituting 19.06% of all Giáy in Vietnam), Yên Bái (2,634 people)	
3. Tai–Kadai, Tai	Lào	0.02%	14,928	17,532	1.61%	Lai Châu (6,922 people, constituting 39.48% of all Lào in Vietnam), Điện Biên (5,152 people, constituting 29.39% of all Lào in Vietnam), Sơn La (4,134 people, constituting 23.58% of all Lào in Vietnam)	
3. Tai–Kadai, Tai	Lự	0.01%	5,601	6,757	1.88%	Lai Châu (6,693 people, constituting 99.05% of all Lự in Vietnam)	Lu
3. Tai–Kadai, Tai	Nùng	1.13%	968,800	1,083,298	1.12%	Lạng Sơn (335,316 people, constituting 42.90% of the province's population and 30.95% of all Nùng in Vietnam), Cao Bằng (158,114 people, constituting 29.81% of the province's population and 14.60% of all Nùng in Vietnam), Bắc Giang (95,806 people), Thái Nguyên (81,740 people), Hà Giang (81,478 people), Đắk Lắk (75,857 people)	
3. Tai–Kadai, Tai	Sán Chay	0.21%	169,410	201,398	1.73%	Tuyên Quang (70,636 people, constituting 35.07% of all Sán Chay in Vietnam), Thái Nguyên (39,472 people, constituting 19.60% of all Sán Chay in Vietnam), Bắc Giang (30,283 people), Quảng Ninh (16,346 people)	San Chay, Cao Lan
3. Tai–Kadai, Tai	Tày	1.92%	1,626,392	1,845,492	1.26%	Lạng Sơn (282,014 people), Cao Bằng (216,577 people, 40.84% of the province's population), Tuyên Quang (205,624 people), Hà Giang (192,702 people)	Tay, the largest minority in Vietnam.
3. Tai–Kadai, Tai	Thái	1.89%	1,550,423	1,820,950	1.61%	Sơn La (669,265 people, 53.61% of the province's population), Nghệ An (338,559 people), Thanh Hóa (247,817 people), Điện Biên (213,714 people), Lai Châu (142,898 people)	Includes Tai Daeng, Tai Dón, Tai Dam and other minority groups.
4. Tai-Kadai, Kra	Cờ Lao	<0.005%	2,636	4,003	4.18%	Hà Giang (2,922 people, constituting 73.00% of all Cờ Lao in Vietnam)	Gelao
4. Tai-Kadai, Kra	La Chí	0.02%	13,158	15,126	1.39%	Hà Giang (13,828 people, constituting 91.42% of all La Chí in Vietnam)	Lachi
4. Tai-Kadai, Kra	La Ha	0.01%	8,177	10,157	2.17%	Sơn La (10,015 people, constituting 98.60% of all La Ha in Vietnam)	Laha
4. Tai-Kadai, Kra	Pu Péo	<0.005%	687	903	2.73%	Hà Giang (771 people, constituting 85.38% of all Pu Péo in Vietnam)	Qabiao, Pubiao
5. Hmong–Mien	Dao	0.93%	751,067	891,151	1.71%	Hà Giang (127,181 people, constituting 14.27% of all Dao in Vietnam), Tuyên Quang (105,359 people), Lào Cai (104,045 people), Yên Bái (101,223 people), Quảng Ninh (73,591 people)	Yao people, also known as Mien, many speak Iu Mien language.
5. Hmong–Mien	Hmong	1.45%	1,068,189	1,393,547	2.66%	Hà Giang (292,677 people), Điện Biên (228,279 people), Sơn La (200,480 people), Lào Cai (183,172 people), Lai Châu (110,323 people), Yên Bái (107,049 people)	Formerly known as Mèo, classified as Miao in China.
5. Hmong–Mien	Pà Thẻn	0.01%	6,811	8,248	1.91%	Hà Giang (6,502 people, constituting 78.83% of all Pà Thẻn in Vietnam), Tuyên Quang (1,258 people, constituting 15.25% of all Pà Thẻn in Vietnam)	Pa-Hng
6. Malayo-Polynesian	Chăm	0.19%	161,729	178,948	1.01%	Ninh Thuận (67,517 people, constituting 37.73% of all Chăm in Vietnam), Bình Thuận (39,557 people, constituting 22.11% of all Chăm in Vietnam), Phú Yên (22,813 people), An Giang (11,171 people), Hồ Chí Minh City (10,509 people), Đồng Nai (8,603 people), Bình Định (6,364 people)	Cham, descendants of the Champa polities of Southern Vietnam.
6. Malayo-Polynesian	Chu Ru	0.02%	19,314	23,242	1.85%	Lâm Đồng (22,473 people, constituting 96.70% of all Chu Ru in Vietnam)	Chru
6. Malayo-Polynesian	Ê Đê	0.41%	331,194	398,671	1.85%	Đăk Lăk (351,278 people, constituting 18.79% of the province's population and 88.11% of all Ê Đê in Vietnam), Phú Yên (25,225 people)	Rade
6. Malayo-Polynesian	Gia Rai	0.53%	411,275	513,930	2.23%	Gia Lai (459,738 people, constituting 30.37% of the province's population and 89.46% of all Jrai in Vietnam), Kon Tum (25,883 people), Đắk Lắk (20,495 people)	Jarai
6. Malayo-Polynesian	Raglay	0.15%	122,245	146,613	1.82%	Ninh Thuận (70,366 people, constituting 48.00% of all Raglay in Vietnam), Khánh Hòa (55,844 people, constituting 38.09% of all Raglay in Vietnam), Bình Thuận (17,382 people)	Roglai
7. Sino-Tibetan languages, Chinese languages	Hoa	0.78%	823,071	749,466	-0.94%	Ho Chi Minh City (382,826 people, constituting 51.08% of all Hoa in Vietnam), Đồng Nai (87,497 people), Sóc Trăng (62,389 people), Kiên Giang (24,051 people), Bắc Giang (20,225 people), Bình Dương (17,993 people)	Make up those with Cantonese background. Not to be confused with the Ngái Hakka, who are classified separately.
7. Sino-Tibetan languages, Chinese languages	Ngái	<0.005%	1,035	1,649	4.66%	Thái Nguyên (800 people, constituting 48.51% of all Ngái in Vietnam), Bình Thuận (188 people, constituting 11.40% of all Ngái in Vietnam)	Hakka Chinese, classified separately from the Hoa.
7. Sino-Tibetan languages, Chinese languages	Sán Dìu	0.19%	146,821	183,004	2.2%	Thái Nguyên (56,477 people, constituting 30.86% of all Sán Dìu in Vietnam), Vĩnh Phúc (46,222 people, constituting 25.26% of all Sán Dìu in Vietnam), Bắc Giang (33,846 people), Quảng Ninh (20,669 people)	San Diu, Yao that speak Cantonese, though some know Iu Mien.
7. Sino-Tibetan languages, Chinese languages	Cống	<0.005%	2,029	2,729	2.96%	Lai Châu (1,513 people, constituting 55.44% of all Cống in Vietnam), Điện Biên (1,145 people, constituting 41.96% of all Cống in Vietnam)	Phunoi
7. Sino-Tibetan languages, Chinese languages	Hà Nhì	0.03%	21,725	25,539	1.62%	Lai Châu (15,952 people, constituting 62.46% of all Hà Nhì in Vietnam), Lào Cai (4,661 people), Điện Biên (4,555 people)	Hani
7. Sino-Tibetan languages, Chinese languages	La Hủ	0.01%	9,651	12,113	2.27%	Lai Châu (12,002 people, constituting 99.08% of all La Hủ in Vietnam)	Lahu
7. Sino-Tibetan languages, Chinese languages	Lô Lô	0.01%	4,541	4,827	0.61%	Cao Bằng (2,861 people, constituting 59.27% of all Lô Lô in Vietnam), Hà Giang (1,707 people)	Yi
7. Sino-Tibetan languages, Chinese languages	Phù Lá	0.01%	10,944	12,471	1.31%	Lào Cai (10,293 people, constituting 82.54% of all Phù Lá in Vietnam), Yên Bái (968 people)	
7. Sino-Tibetan languages, Chinese languages	Si La	<0.005%	709	909	2.48%	Lai Châu (592 people, constituting 65.13% of all Si La in Vietnam), Điện Biên (243 people, constituting 26.73% of all Si La in Vietnam)	

== Other ==
1. Nguồn, possibly Mường group, officially classified as a Việt (Kinh) group by the government, Nguồn themselves identify with Việt ethnicity; their language is a member of the Viet–Muong branch of the Vietic sub-family.
2. Sui (Người Thủy), officially classified as Pa Then people.
3. According to news from Dantri, an online newspaper in Vietnam, the Thừa Thiên-Huế People's Committee in September 2008 announced a plan to do more research in a new ethnic group in Vietnam. It is Pa Kô, also called Pa Cô, Pa Kô, Pa-Kô or Pa Kôh. This ethnic group settles mainly in A Lưới suburban district (Thừa Thiên-Huế) and mountainous area of Hướng Hóa (Quảng Trị). At present, however, they have been classified in Tà Ôi ethnic group.

Many of the local ethnic groups residing in mountain areas are known collectively in the West as Montagnard or Degar. One distinctive feature of highland ethnic minority groups in Vietnam is that they are colorfully attired whether at home, in the farm, traveling or in their hometown.

Foreign expatriate workers are a small portion of the population, some settling permanently or through marriage. Many are migrants from neighboring Asian countries like China, though some are from the west. Today, 2,700 Americans live in Vietnam. Some descend from the French and other Europeans during the protectorate period of the Nguyễn dynasty. However, most European descendants left after the August Revolution and the establishment of republican governments in Vietnam.

== See also ==
- Demographics of Vietnam
