= Rục people =

Subgroup of the Chut people of Vietnam

The Rục people are a sub-ethnic group within the Chut people. As of April 2022, they numbered 580 individuals living in 144 households in Thượng Hóa, a commune in the district of Minh Hóa in the province of Quảng Trị in north-central Vietnam.

At the end of 1959, Ca Xeng border guards encountered Rục people living in caves in western Quảng Bình province during a patrol. After months of approaching them, the border guards finally managed to persuade them to leave the caves and settle in Ruc Lan Valley, Thuong Hoa Commune. In 2013, after over 50 years of merging with this community, the Ruc were included on the list of the 10 least-known tribes of the world.

Since then, as of 2006, the government has made many attempts to relocate them (at least 93 households, 414 people).

They conduct shamanistic rituals that are said to allow them to control animals and to have caused harm to a person at one point.

A Rục woman was the subject of the 2025 documentary Hair, Paper, Water....

== See also ==
- Arem people
