= Tân Trạch =

Tân Trạch may refer to several places in Vietnam:

- Tân Trạch, Cần Đước, a rural commune of Cần Đước District
- Tân Trạch, Quảng Bình, a rural commune of Bố Trạch District
