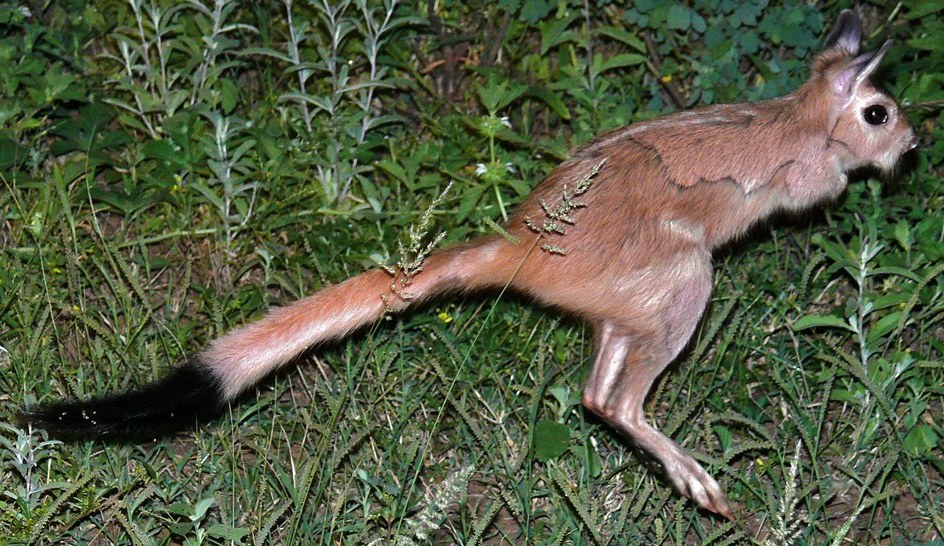

Conservation status
- Least Concern (IUCN 3.1)

Scientific classification
- Kingdom: Animalia
- Phylum: Chordata
- Class: Mammalia
- Order: Rodentia
- Family: Pedetidae
- Genus: Pedetes
- Species: P. capensis

Binomial name
- Pedetes capensis (Forster, 1778)
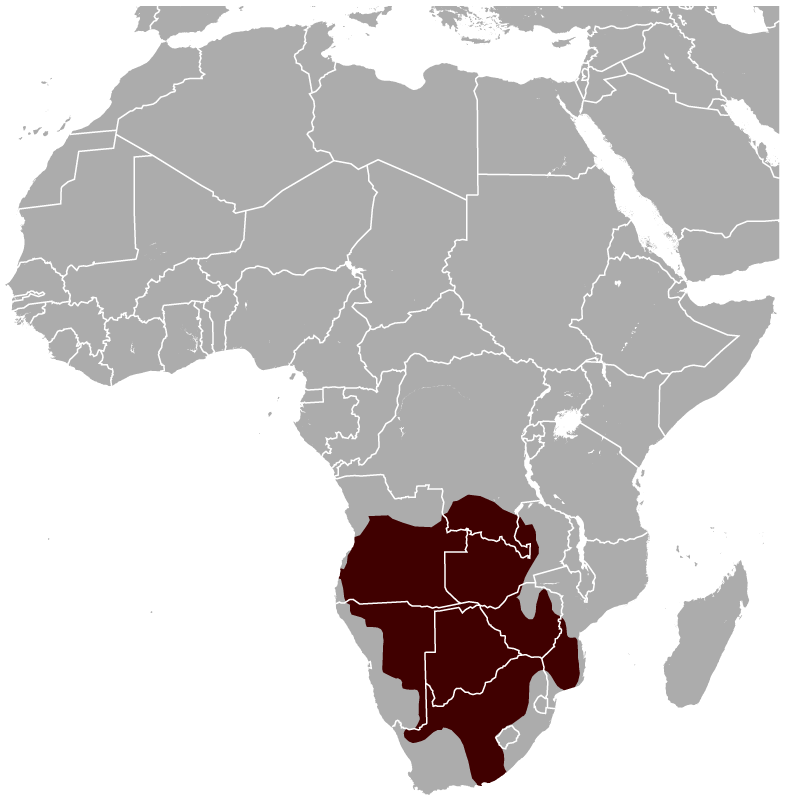
- South African springhare range.

Synonyms
- Yerbua capensis; Pedetes albaniensis; Pedetes angolae; Pedetes cafer; Pedetes damarensis; Pedetes fouriei; Pedetes orangiae; Pedetes salinae; Pedetes typicus

= South African springhare =

South African springhare Temporal range: Calabrian to present 1.8–0 Ma

Species of rodent

The South African springhare (Pedetes capensis) (Afrikaans: springhaas) is a medium-sized terrestrial and burrowing rodent. Despite the name, it is not a hare. It is one of two extant species in the genus Pedetes, and is native to southern Africa. Formerly, the genus was considered monotypic and the East African springhare (P. surdaster) was included in P. capensis.

Springhares live throughout semi-arid areas in southern Africa, preferentially in sandy plains and pans with short grasses. In agricultural areas, springhares can be considered a pest due to their destructive feeding on crops. However, they are not currently considered under an impending risk of extinction.

== Etymology and taxonomy ==
The springhare was named in English by William John Burchell in 1822, who derived "springhare" from the Afrikaans name springhaas. The generic name Pedetes comes from the Greek Πηδητές (Pidités), meaning "leaper or dancer". The specific name capensis, a Latin word meaning "of the Cape", refers to the Cape of Good Hope and Cape Province, the species' type locality.

Originally named as Yerbua capensis by Johann Reinhold Forster in 1778, using a genus that was applied to kangaroos in the previous year by Eberhard August Wilhelm von Zimmermann, the species (at the time considered monotypic, since the East African springhare was not identified until 1902) was renamed to Dipus cafer by Johann Friedrich Gmelin in 1788, placing it in the jerboa family. The genus Pedetes was created by Caroli Illigeri in 1811, when the species was renamed Pedetes cafer; contemporary naturalists would recognize the precedence of the specific name capensis and corrected the species to P. capensis in the early 19th century.

== Characteristics ==
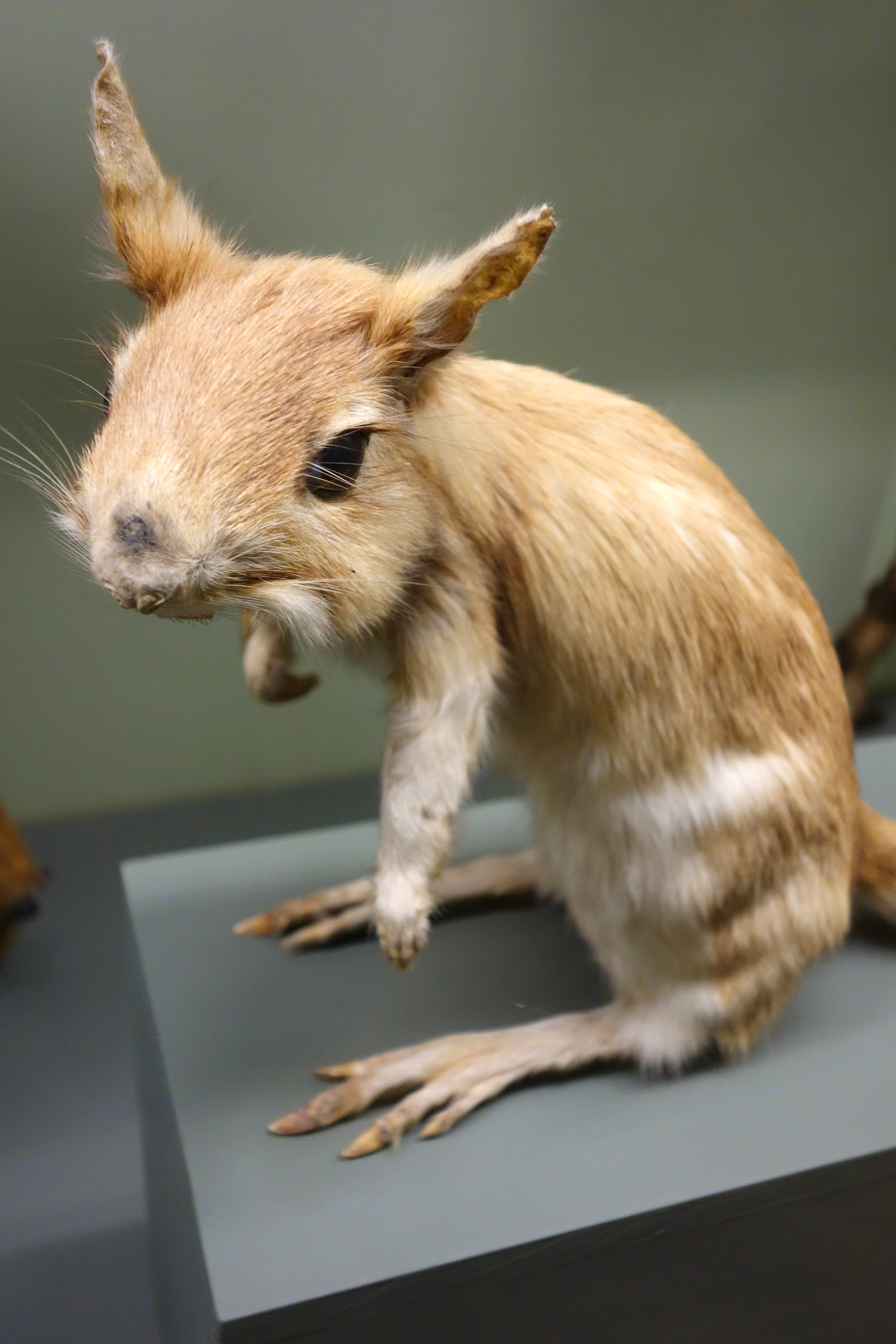
Taxidermied South African springhare

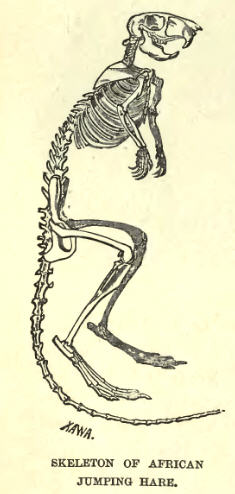
South African springhare skeleton

The springhare resembles a small kangaroo with well-developed hind legs, short front legs, and a long tail which comprises half of its body length. As well as a long tail, springhares have relatively large eyes and ears. Adults can attain 80 cm (31 in) in length (including the tail) and weigh an average of 2.5–3.5 kg (5.5–7.7 lb). Similar to kangaroos, they are also saltatorial animals who use their tails for balance. Springhares are reported to be able to make hops of 20 cm (7.9 in) and leaps of 2 m (6 ft 7 in).

Springhares have long, soft fur, which shortens around the legs, heads, and ears. The colour of this mammal varies from a reddish-brown on its upperparts to an off-white belly and a black tip on the tail. Sometimes the ear tips are also black. Young springhares have finer and fluffier fur and usually have black patches of fur under their hind feet and in a patch of black under their tail base.

Springhares have a different number of toes on their forelegs and hindlegs. Their short forelegs have five digits, each ending in a long, sharp, curved claw, which can be 16 millimetres long. their long hindlegs have four digits, three of which are visibly developed and equipped with a strong triangular nail.

The oldest recorded individual was 88 months (7 years and 4 months) old.

=== Biofluorescence ===
Springhare fur is biofluorescent. Their biofluorescence is patchy, with areas important to grooming and intra-specific interactions being the most biofluorescent. Little is known about its biofluorescence, but both species of springhare are the first thoroughly documented cases of biofluorescence in an Old World eutherian mammal.

=== Regeneration ===
In a study of ear regeneration in mammals, springhares were found to have the capacity for minimal ear tissue regeneration. This regeneration is far behind to that of rabbits.

== Ecology and behaviour ==
Springhares are nocturnal animals, who forage during the night and retreat to a burrow during the day. While sleeping in their burrows, springhares sleep standing, with their head and forelimbs bent down in between their hindlegs, and their tail wrapped around their feet.

These animals are predated upon by a variety of predators, including humans; at least 21 species prey on springhares in the Kalahari.

=== Burrowing ===
Springhares are burrowing animals. They dig their own burrows on well-drained sandy soils, preferentially during the wet season.

The front claws loosen soil from the burrow wall while the teeth cut through roots. The front feet toss the soil beneath the body and the hind feet kick it further back. When the pile of loosened soil is large enough, the springhare turns around, and with its chin, chest and front feet held up against the pile, it pushes the soil to the entrance with thrusts of the hind feet.

— Butynski & Mattingly, Burrow structure and fossorial ecology of the springhare Pedetes capensis in Botswana, African Journal of Ecology (1979)

Burrows are often located near trees or shrubs, which are sparse in the typical springhare habitat. It is thought they may help with concealment as well as providing a point of reference back to the burrow. A springhare's burrow is 20 cm in diameter, may be up to 1 meter deep and up to 7 meters long. Burrows may cover an area of up to 170 m^{2}. They usually have several entrances. Two types of entrances can be distinguished, one which is very visible thanks to the pile of sand present at the opening, and the other one which is a "hidden" entrance with no soil to mark its presence.

Springhares remain close to one of their burrow entrances while feeding and if disturbed, they return to their own burrows, ignoring other burrows in the way. Radio-tracked springhares used burrows in areas covering 0.6 to 28.5 ha.

Springhares tend to only reside in any given burrow for a few consecutive days at most. In a study of their burrowing activities in South Africa, they found that springhares used 4 to 27 different burrows, and most burrows (70%) were only ever used by a single springhare. Very few burrows were used by more than two animals. In the same study, they found cohabitation (two springhares using the same burrow at the same time) to be very rare. The same burrows may be used throughout generations and expanded, with new tunnels added as needed. While springhares have not been seen defending their burrows or territory, they mark the burrows with their perineal glands secretions, or by urinating at the burrow entrance, probably to warn other springhares that a specific burrow is occupied.

Springhares are able to plug entrances to their burrows with soil. Two plug types were distinguished. Temporary plugs formed from the inside of the burrow, probably aimed at avoiding predators entering a burrow. Permanent plugs were long (0.5 – 3 m) and sometimes filled entire tunnel branches.

The springhare's unoccupied burrows are sometimes used for hiding during the daytime by a number of other species, including the black-footed cat and the ground pangolin.

=== Feeding and foraging ===
Springhares are herbivorous, eating a variety of plant matter, such as roots, stems, leaves, and seeds. However, springhares are picky eaters and often leave abundant plant materials behind in their feeding grounds. On occasion, springhares may feed on insects such as beetles or locusts, or even carrion.

Springhares feed at night and can range 150 – 400 m away of one of their burrows. They may feed in large groups of up to nine individuals. In these instances, they do not display aggression or territorial behaviours.

=== Reproduction ===
Springhares breed throughout the year and have a gestation period of about 77 days. The females give birth to a single young about three times a year. Moreover, females can be lactating and in the early stages of pregnancy at the same time.

Their ability to reproduce year-round is thought to be attributable to their highly selective diet (choosing only the best parts of the plant), their wide range of foods available to them (above and underground), and their behavioural and physical adaptations to living in arid and semi-arid conditions.

Springhares give birth in a burrow to a furred young of about 250 - 300 g. Springhares usually give birth to a single young, but birthing twins is known to occur. While the young remains at the burrow, the mother stops the usual behaviour of moving burrows every couple of days. She is bound to same the burrow as her young, who depends entirely on her milk. The young stays in the burrow for approximately seven weeks until they attain a body weight of approximately 1.3 kg. The extended period of parental care may help mitigate a birthrate that is, among rodents, remarkably low.

== Traditional human uses ==
San and baTswana people both traditionally make use of springhares. Both groups of people hunt springhares, which can yield up to 1360 g (3 lb.) of meat. Aside from the meat, San people use springhare skins for a variety of uses, such as bags, mats, karosses (garments or blankets made from sewn animal skins) and hats. The tail provides sinew for sewing, and an ornamental belt that produces sounds can be made by tying springhare toes on a string.

== Gallery ==
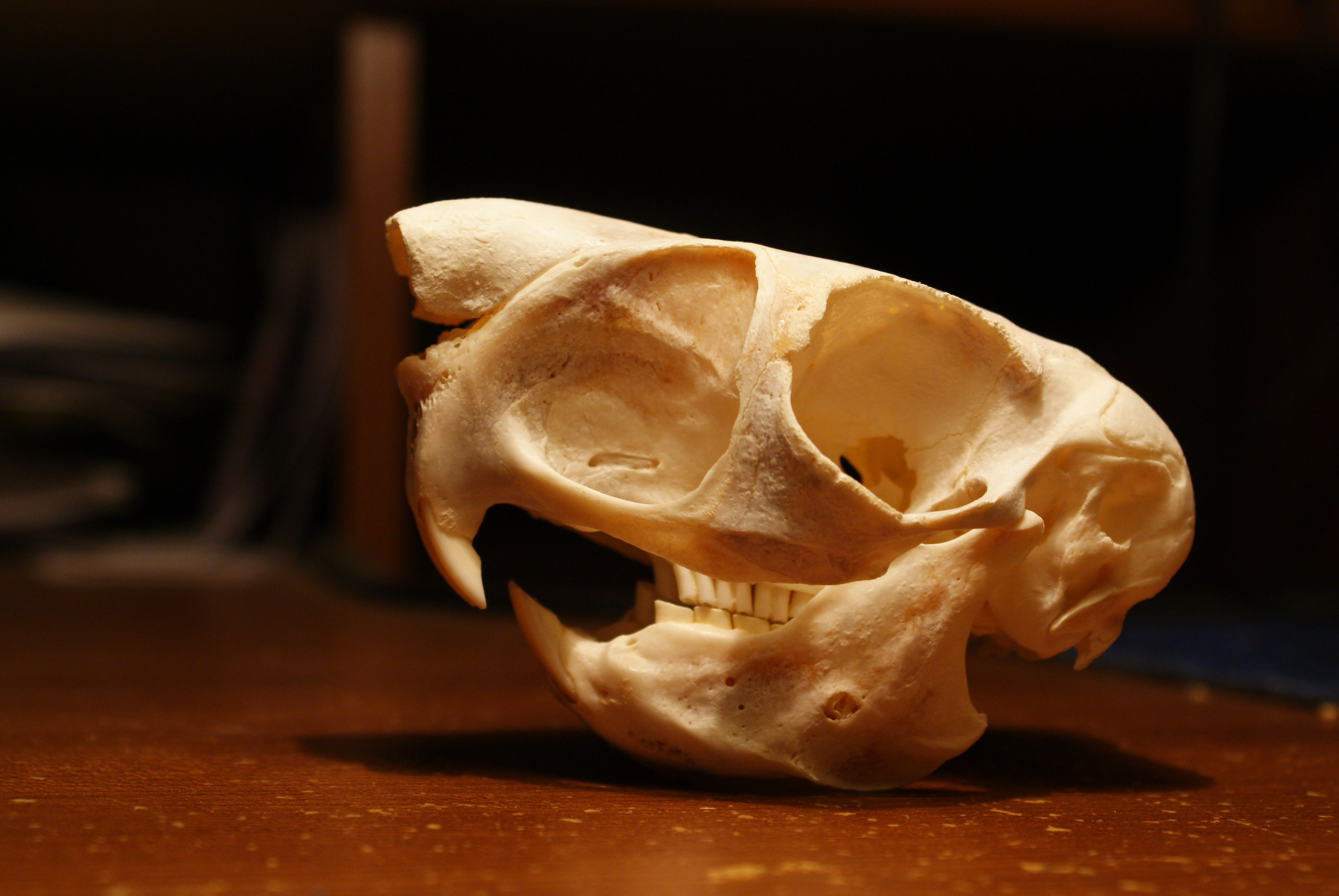
Skull of a South African springhare

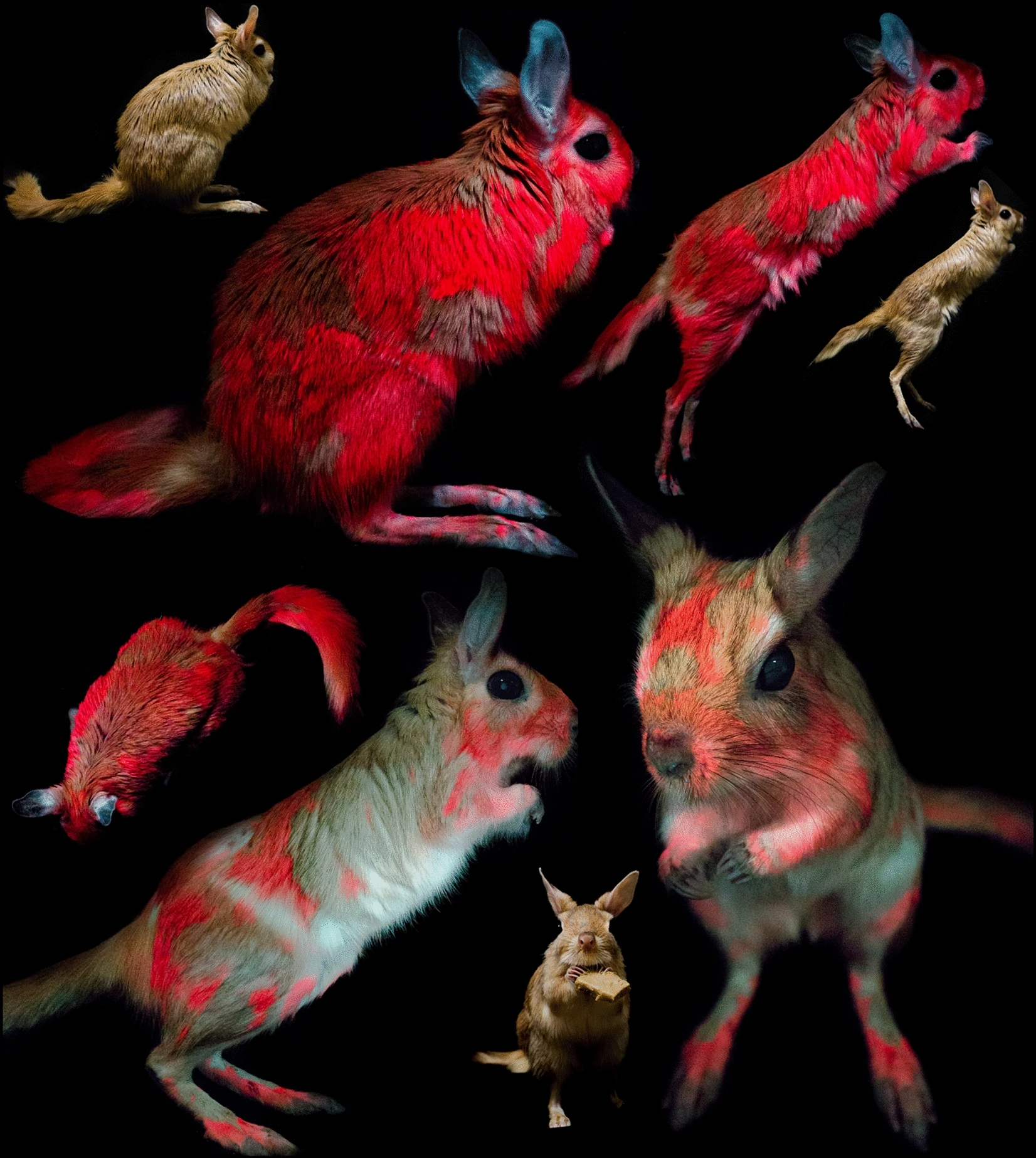
Biofluorescence in captive South African springhare

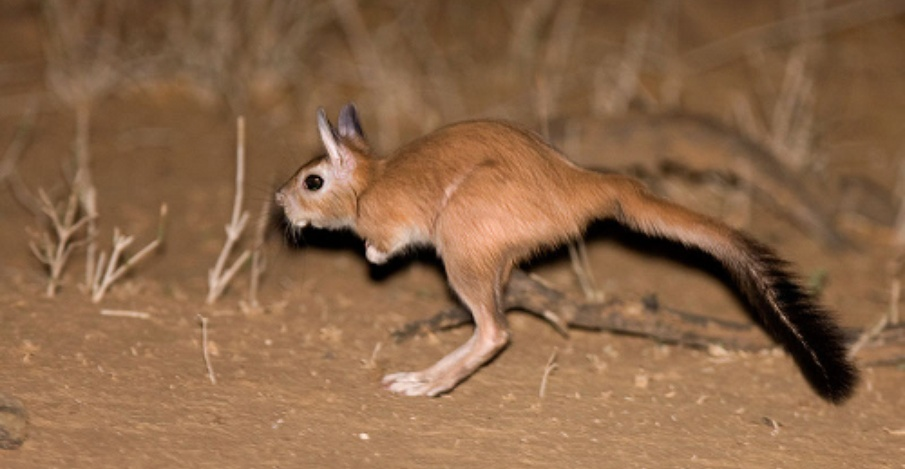
A hopping springhare.

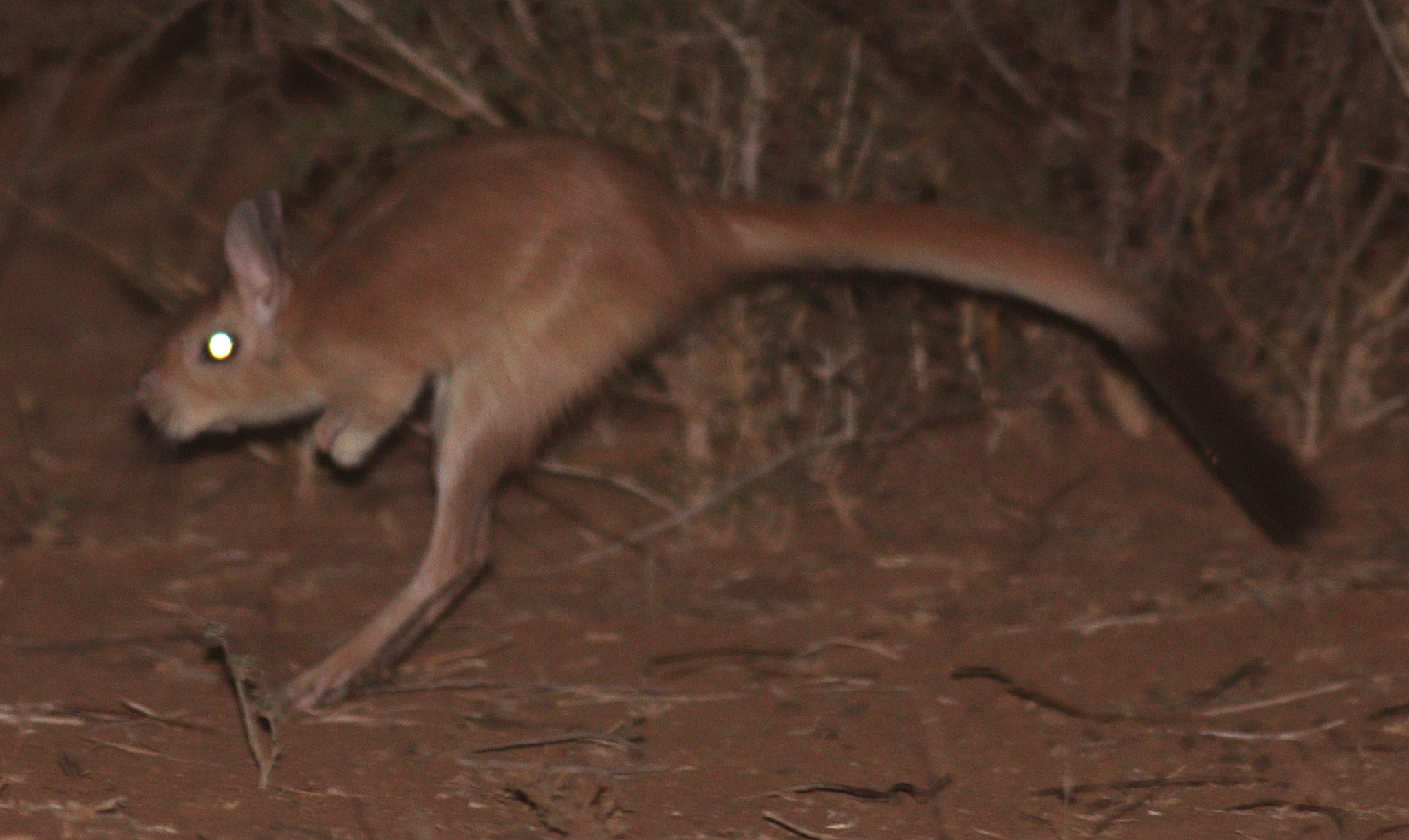
A jumping springhare.

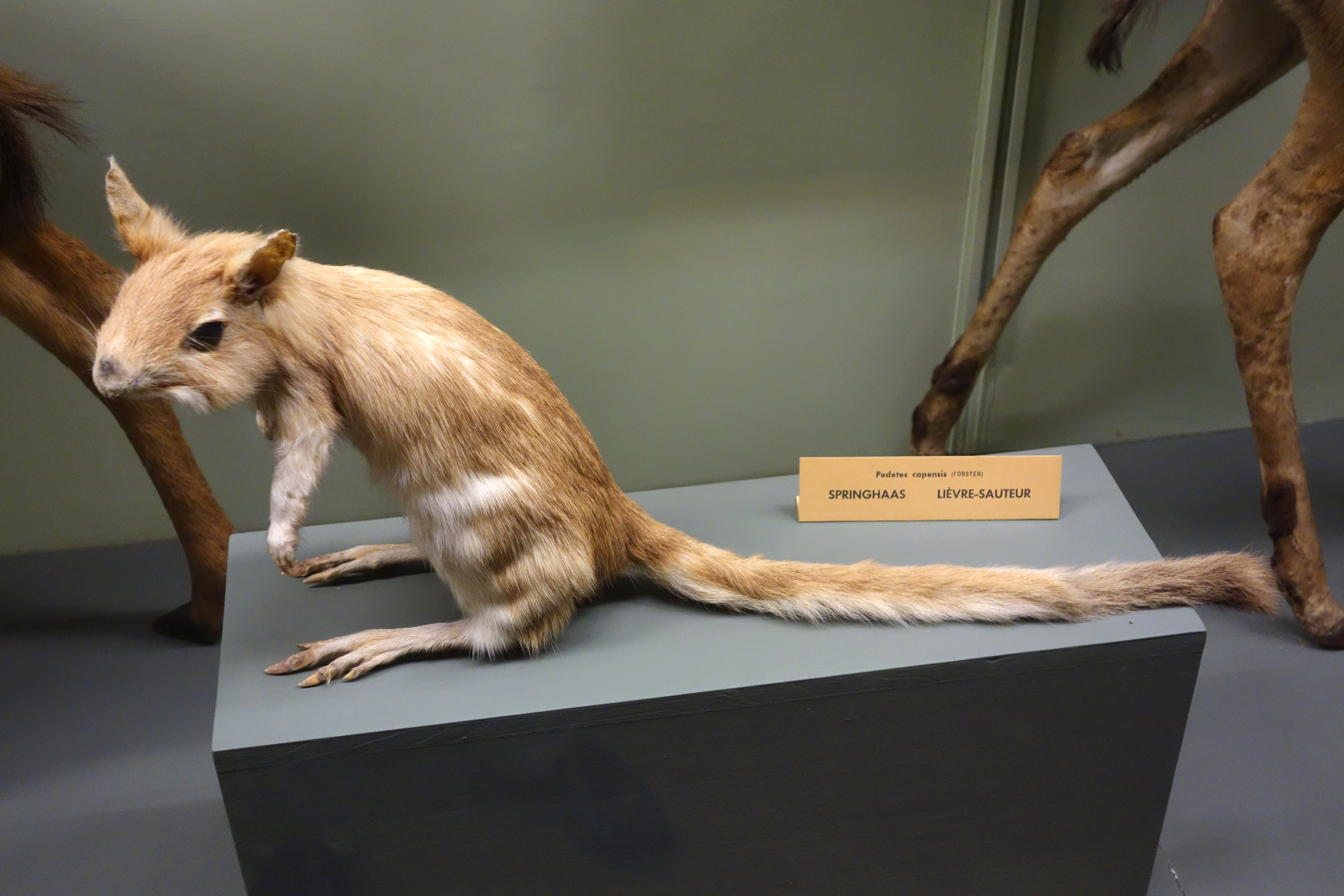
A taxidermied springhare in a museum collection.

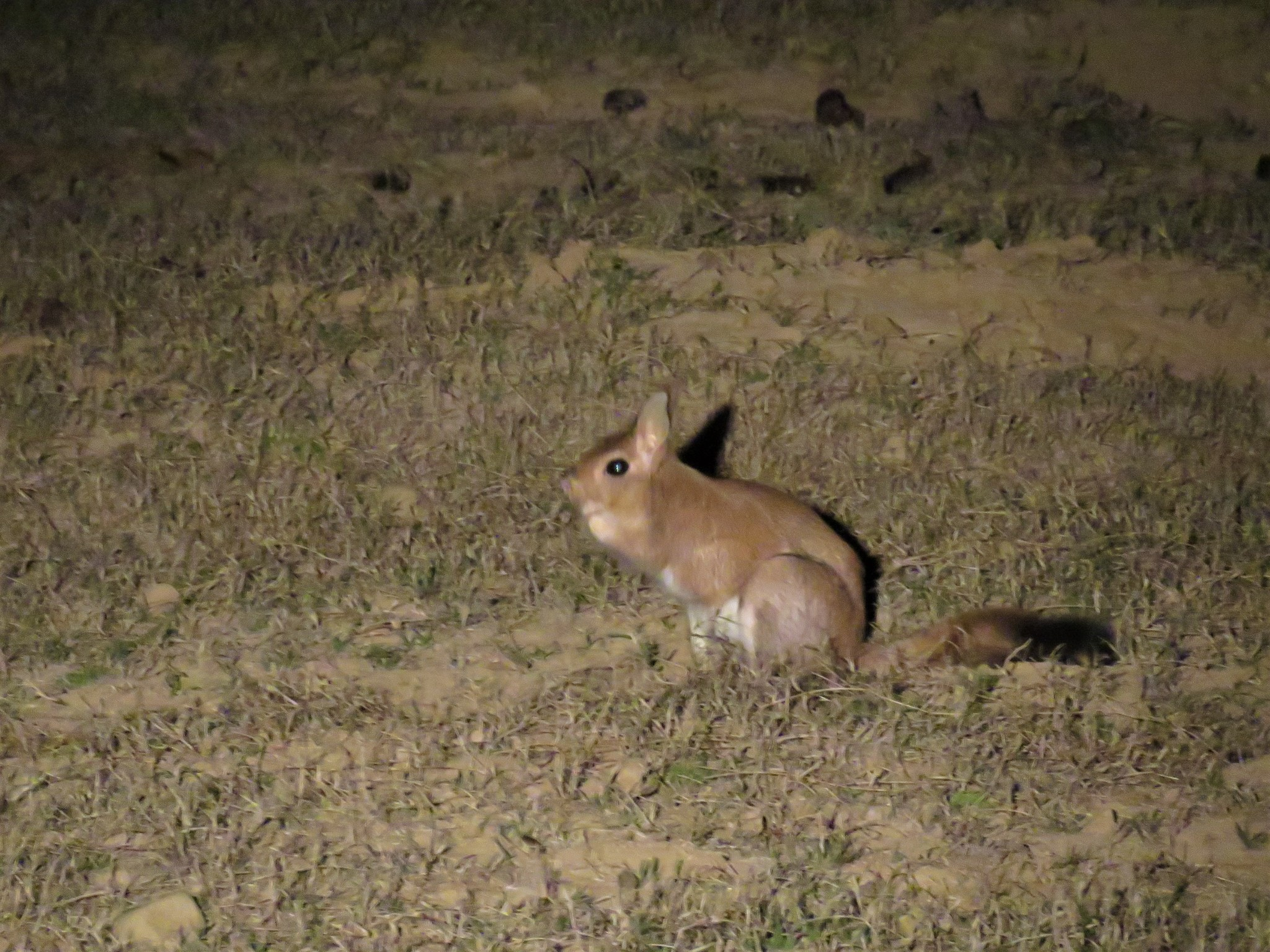
Springhare in South Africa

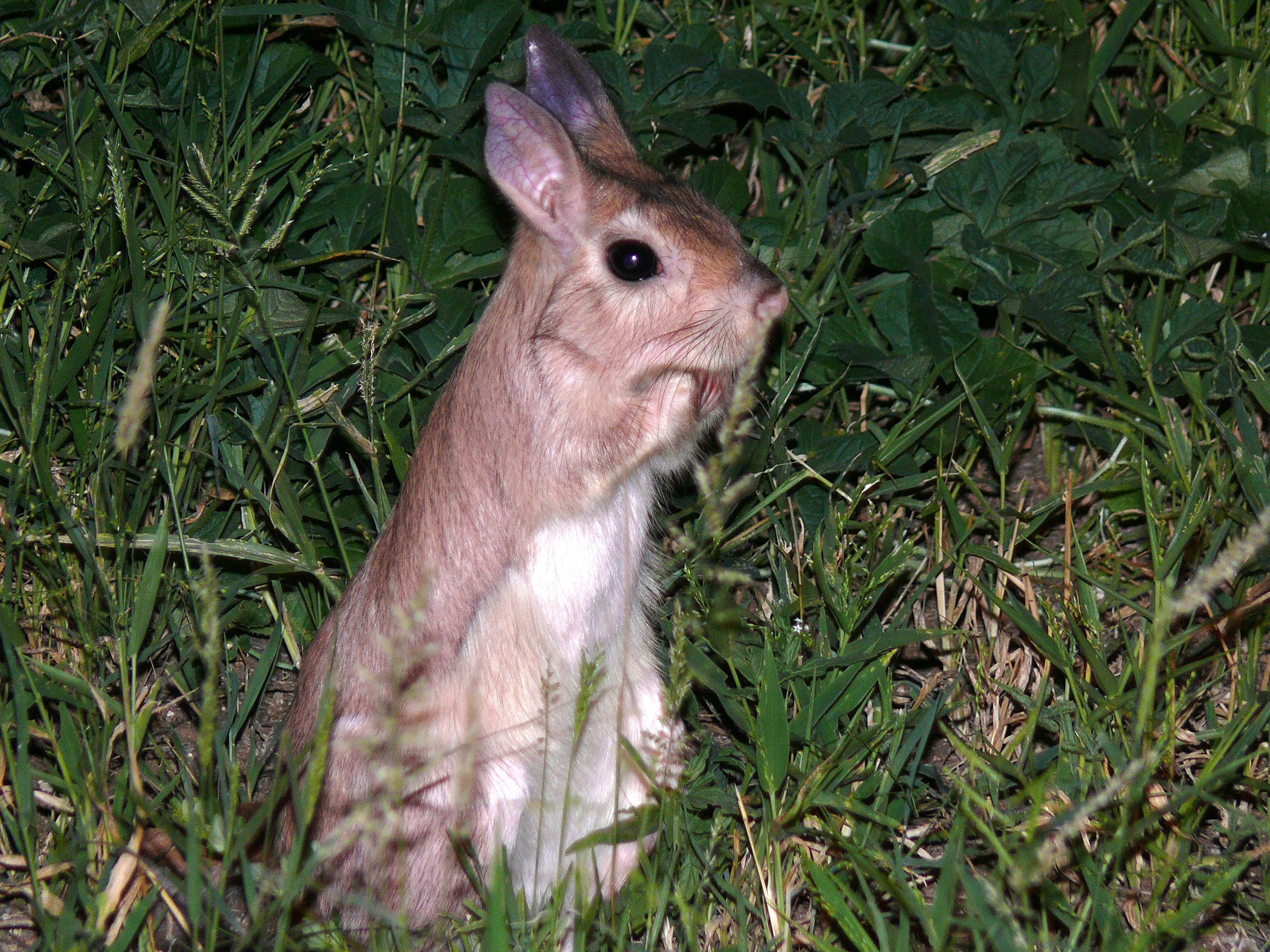
Springhare standing up.
