= Inopinatia =

Inopinatia Temporal range: Early Oligocene

Scientific classification
- Kingdom: Animalia
- Phylum: Chordata
- Class: Mammalia
- Infraclass: Placentalia
- Order: Rodentia
- Family: Diatomyidae
- Genus: †Inopinatia; Marković et al., 2017
- Species: †I. balkanica

Binomial name
- †Inopinatia balkanica Marković et al., 2017

Inopinatia is an extinct genus of diatomyid that lived during the Rupelian stage of the Oligocene epoch.

== Distribution ==
Inopinatia balkanica is known from Serbia.
