= Hòn La Economic Zone =

Special economic zone in Vietnam

Hon La Economic Zone ((in Vietnamese): Khu kinh tế Hòn La) is one of special economic zones in Vietnam. This zone is located by the Hon La Port in Quảng Trạch District, Quảng Bình Province, Bắc Trung Bộ, Vietnam. The economic zone covers 100 square kilometers, including communes: Quảng Đông, Quảng Phú, Quảng Tùng, Cảnh Dương, Quảng Hưng and Quảng Xuân. Hon La Economic Zone is situated 60 km north Đồng Hới, around 440 km south of Hanoi, at the foot of Ngang Pass, near the Vung Ang Economic Zone in Hà Tĩnh Province with deep-water Vung Ang Port. The National Route 1 and Vietnamese main railway runs along the zone. The economic zone is accessed by road, railway at Đồng Hới Railway Station or by air at Đồng Hới Airport (54 km south) or Phu Bai International Airport (220 km south).

To attract investment, preferentially reduced taxes, fees, land hire and investment incentives are applied to investors. As of 2009, Petrovietnam is operating a deep-water Hon La Port (a port capable to serve 10,000 tonne vessel, full capacity will reach up to 12 million tonnes of cargoes per annum). Petrovietnam is preparing to build a 2,400 MW coal-fuelled thermal power plant (Quang Trach Thermal Power Plant, total estimate is $1.5 billion) in this economic zone.

== See also ==
- Cha Lo Border Gate Economic Zone in Quảng Bình Province
- Bắc Trung Bộ
