= Nguyễn Đại Đồng =

Vietnamese footballer

Personal information
- Full name: Nguyễn Đại Đồng
- Date of birth: 5 September 1986 (age 40)
- Place of birth: Quảng Xương, Thanh Hóa, Vietnam
- Height: 1.75 m (5 ft 9 in)
- Position: Defender

Youth career
- 2002–2005: Haliada Thanh Hóa

Senior career*
Years	Team	Apps	(Gls)
2006–2008	Cảng Sài Gòn	25	(0)
2008–2011	Hà Nội T&T	37	(0)
2012–2013	Sài Gòn	13	(0)
2014–2015	Cần Thơ	10	(0)
2015–2019	Hà Nội	64	(0)

International career
2007–2009	Vietnam U23	3	(0)
- * Club domestic league appearances and goals as of 25 June 2019

Nguyễn Đại Đồng (born 5 September 1986, in Quảng Xương District, Thanh Hóa Province) is a retired Vietnamese footballer who plays as a defender for V.League 1 club Hanoi FC.

== Honours ==
=== Club ===
Hà Nội F.C.

- V.League 1:

(gold) Winners : 2010, 2013, 2016, 2018, 2019
(silver) Runners-up : 2011, 2012, 2014, 2015
(bronze) Third place: : 2017

- Vietnamese Super Cup:

(gold) Winners : 2018
(silver) Runners-up : 2013, 2015, 2016

- Vietnamese National Cup:

(gold) Winners : 2019
(silver) Runners-up : 2012, 2015, 2016

- AFC Cup
  - Quarter-finals 2014 AFC Cup
