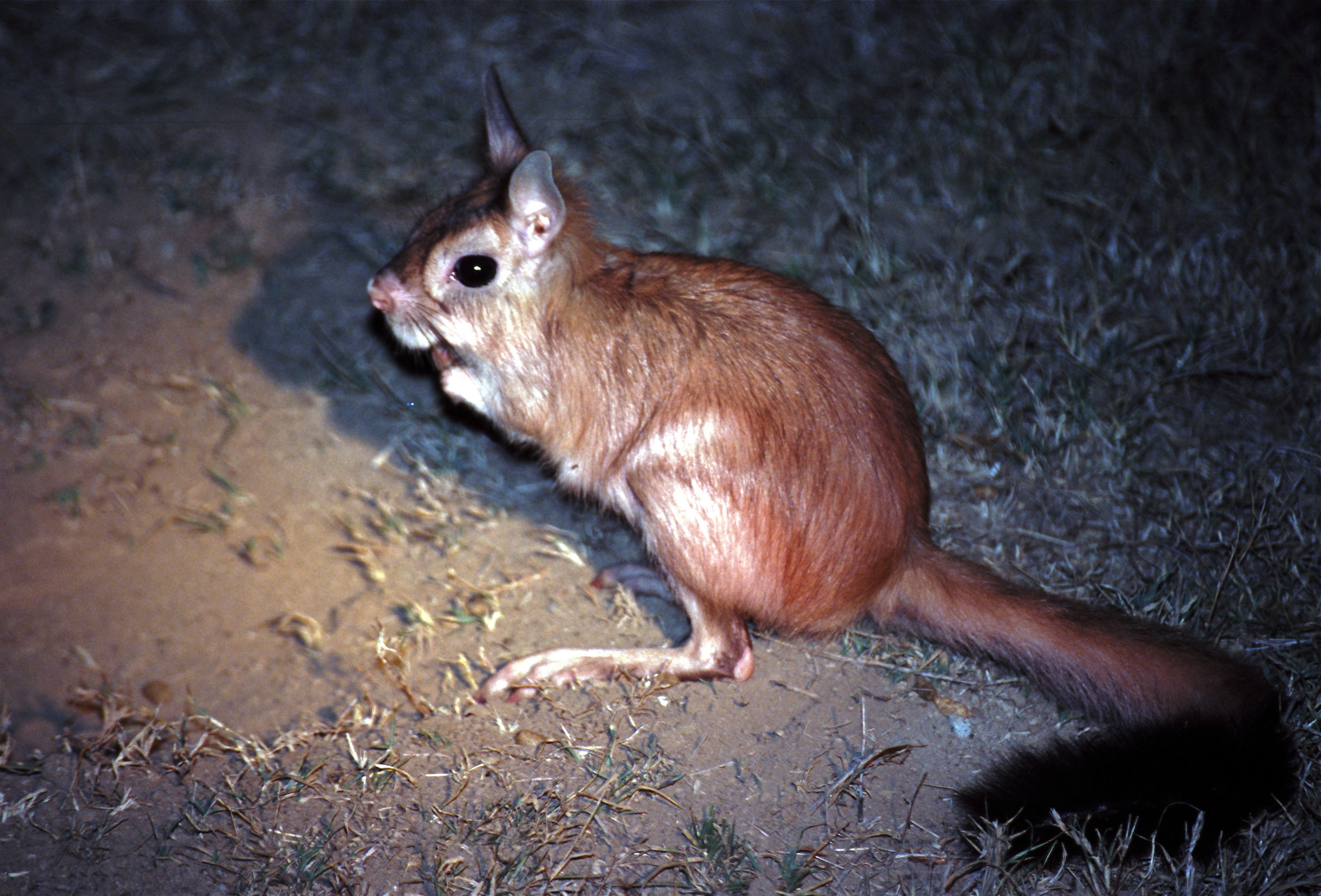
- In Mbwea Safari Camp, Nakuru, Kenya

Conservation status
- Least Concern (IUCN 3.1)

Scientific classification
- Kingdom: Animalia
- Phylum: Chordata
- Class: Mammalia
- Infraclass: Placentalia
- Order: Rodentia
- Family: Pedetidae
- Genus: Pedetes
- Species: P. surdaster

Binomial name
- Pedetes surdaster Thomas, 1902
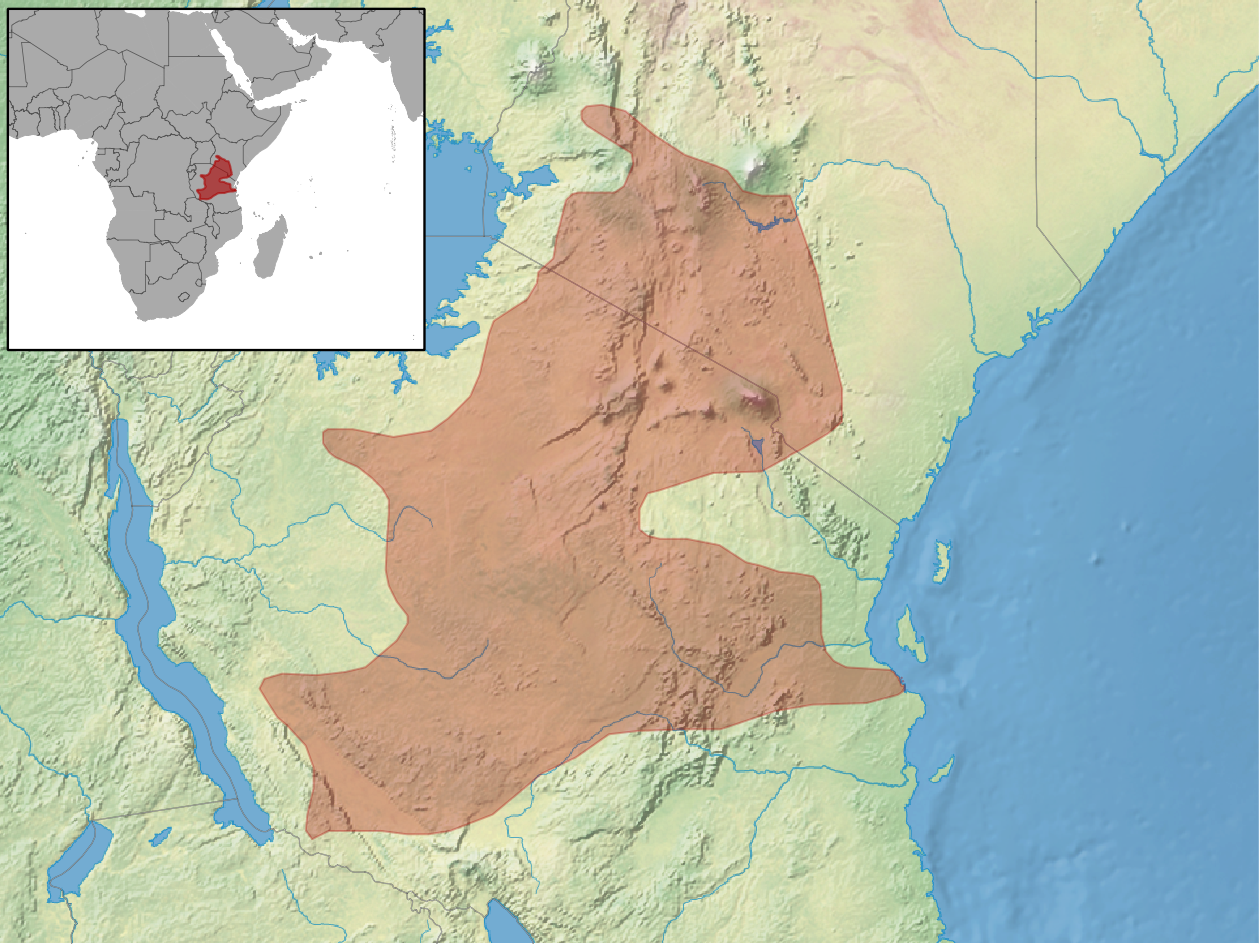

Synonyms
- P.currax - Hollister, 1918; P. dentatus - Miller, 1927; P. larvalis - Hollister, 1918; P. taborae - G. M. Allen and Loveridge, 1927

= East African springhare =

Species of rodent

The East African springhare (Pedetes surdaster) is an African mammal found in Kenya and Tanzania that is closely related to the South African springhare. It is a member of the Pedetidae, a rodent family, and resembles a small kangaroo.

== Taxonomy ==
Pedetes surdaster was recognised by Matthee and Robinson in 1997 as a species distinct from the southern African springhare (P. capensis) based on genetic, morphological, and ethological differences. P. capensis from South Africa has fewer chromosomes (2n= 38) than does P. surdaster which has (2n = 40) and some other genetic variations. The species was confirmed by Dieterlen in 2005.

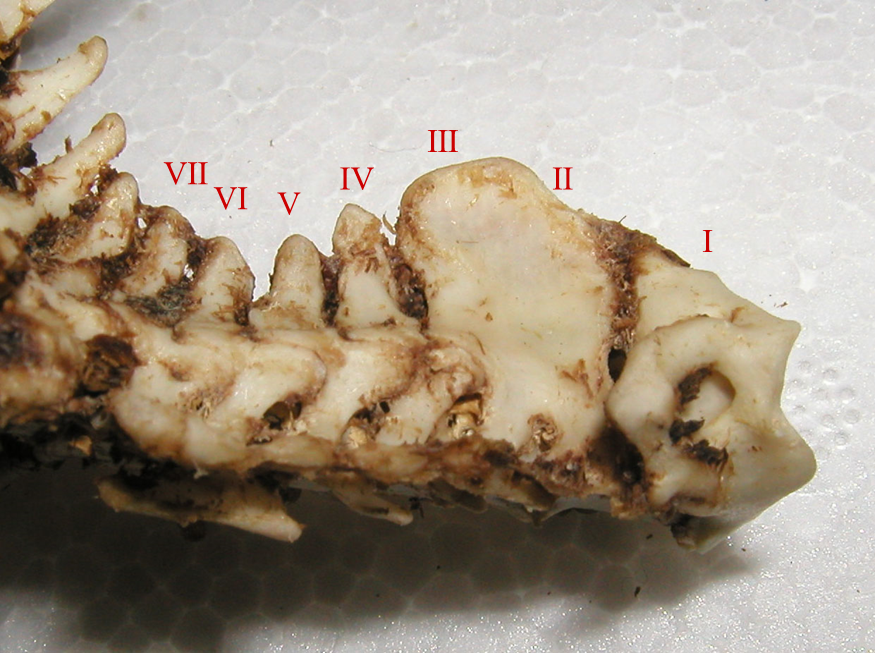
Cervical vertebrae of P. surdaster, congenital cervical fusion.

Unlike P. capensis, the second and third cervical vertebrae are fused in this species.

== Distribution ==
This species is found in central and southern Kenya and most of Tanzania. A single specimen has been recorded in Uganda near the Kenya border, at Mount Moroto. It is found from sea level up to an altitude over 2,000 m.

== Description ==
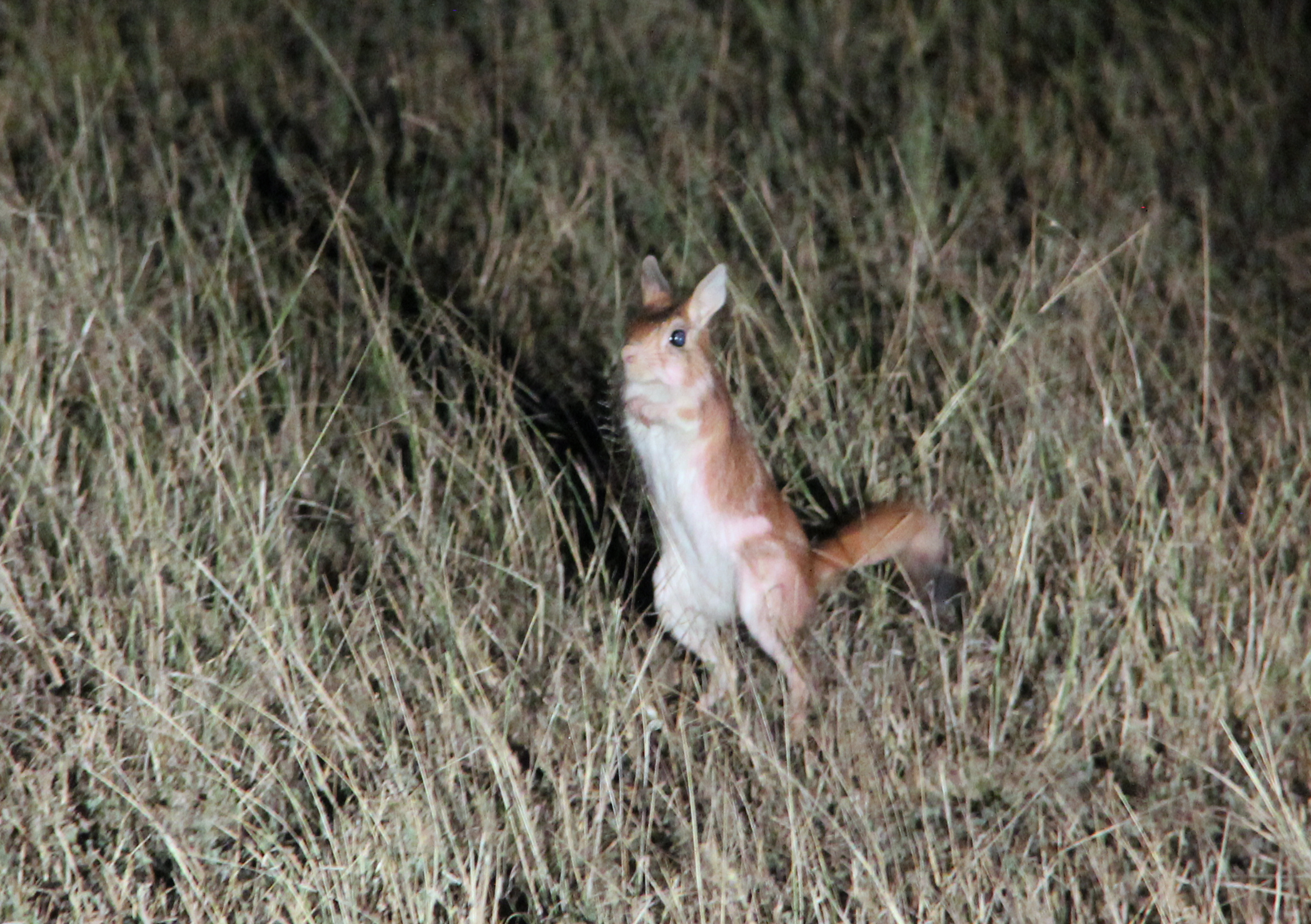
An East African springhare in Amboseli National Park, Kenya

The East African springhare resembles a small kangaroo (a marsupial in the family Macropodidae of Oceania), and is about the size of a rabbit (Oryctolagus cuniculus). It is mid-brown, has large erect ears, very short forelegs, and long powerful hind legs. It moves in bounds of up to 12 feet and has a long tail fringed with black hairs which provides balance.

== Ecology ==
The East African springhare is nocturnal and spends the day in an extensive system of burrows. It lives in semiarid grassland habitats. The diet is the green parts of plants, roots and other vegetable matter, and occasionally insects.
