= Rusingapedetes =

Rusingapedetes Temporal range: Early Miocene

Scientific classification
- Kingdom: Animalia
- Phylum: Chordata
- Class: Mammalia
- Order: Rodentia
- Family: Pedetidae
- Genus: †Rusingapedetes; Pickford & Mein, 2011
- Species: †R. tsujikawai

Binomial name
- †Rusingapedetes tsujikawai Pickford & Mein, 2011

Rusingapedetes is an extinct genus of pedetid that lived during the Neogene period.

== Distribution ==
Rusingapedetes tsujikawai is known from Early Miocene deposits in Kenya.
