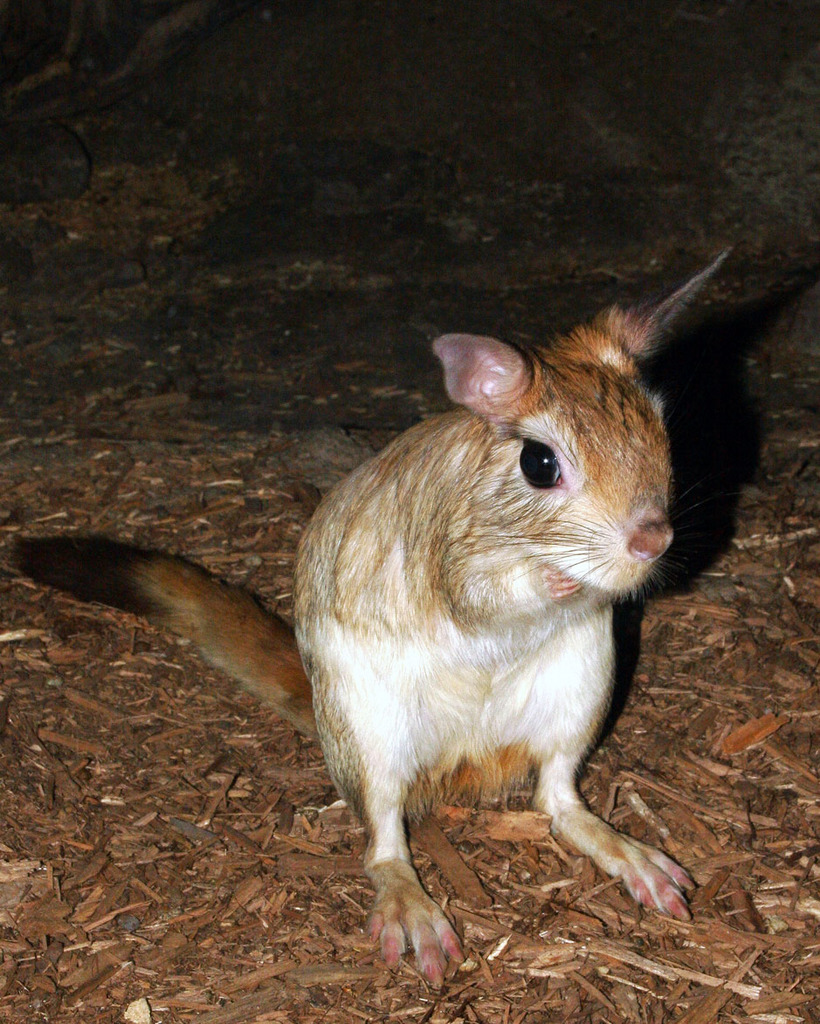
- Springhare (Pedetes sp.)

Scientific classification
- Kingdom: Animalia
- Phylum: Chordata
- Class: Mammalia
- Order: Rodentia
- Suborder: Anomaluromorpha
- Family: Pedetidae; Gray, 1825

Genera
- See text
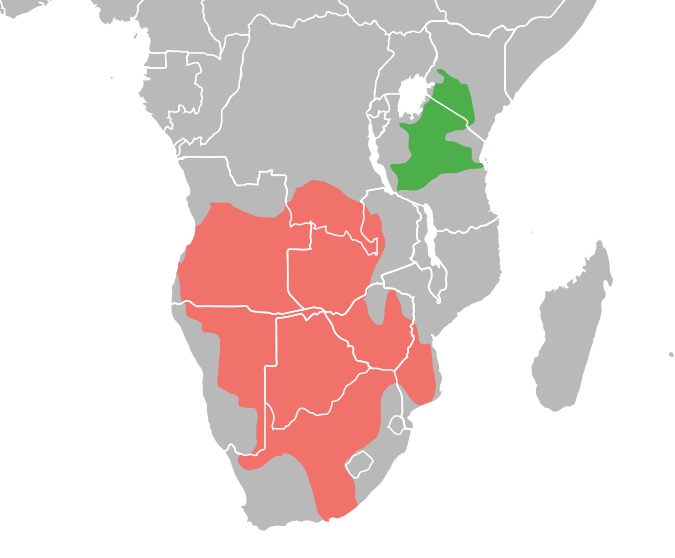
- Pedetidae distribution. Pedetes capensis in red, Pedetes surdaster in green.

= Pedetidae =

Pedetidae Temporal range: Early Miocene to Recent

Family of rodents

The Pedetidae are a family of rodents. The two living species, the springhares, are distributed throughout much of Southern Africa and also around Kenya, Tanzania, and Uganda. Fossils have been found as far north as Turkey. Together with the anomalures and zenkerella, Pedetidae forms the suborder Anomaluromorpha. The fossil genus Parapedetes is also related.

== Taxonomy ==
The family includes one living genus and four extinct genera. The Asian fossil Diatomys was previously included, but is now classified in the family Diatomyidae with the Laotian rock rat.

- Family Pedetidae
  - Genus Pedetes
    - South African springhare, P. capensis
    - †Pedetes gracilis
    - †Pedetes hagenstadti
    - East African springhare, P. surdaster
  - Genus †Megapedetes
    - †Megapedetes aegaeus
    - †Megapedetes gariepensis
    - †Megapedetes pentadactylus
  - Genus †Oldrichpedetes
    - †Oldrichpedetes brigitteae
    - †Oldrichpedetes fejfari
    - †Oldrichpedetes pickfordi
    - †Oldrichpedetes praecursor
  - Genus †Propedetes
    - †Propedetes efeldensis
    - †Propedetes laetoliensis
  - Genus †Rusingapedetes
    - †Rusingapedetes tsujikawai
