= Lê Anh Xuân (scientist) =

Vietnamese businessperson (born 1976)

- Born: Lê Thế Xuân; 19 May 1976 (age 49); Quảng Xương district, Thanh Hóa province
- Other names: Dr. Shrimp: Agricultural scientist; Dr. Shrimp
- Awards: Agricultural scientist (2018)

Lê Anh Xuân (born 19 May 1976) is a Vietnamese businessperson and scientist. He holds a doctorate in aquaculture from Vietnam. He is also known as "Dr. Shrimp" for his contributions to the aquaculture industry, particularly in shrimp breeding.

In 2018, he was recognized as an Agricultural scientist by the Vietnam Farmers' Union. He was also honoured in the science and technology enterprise sector for his research on microbial preparations for the shrimp farming industry.

== Biography ==
Lê Anh Xuân was born on 19 May 1976 in Thanh Hóa. He graduated from the University of Fisheries in Vinh – Nha Trang in 1999. After graduation, he worked for a company trading veterinary medicine for aquatic animals and moved to Bạc Liêu to distribute microbial products in the Mekong Delta provinces. In 2004, he founded Trúc Anh Company.

In 2012, Xuân obtained a master's degree in biotechnology from the Hanoi University of Science and Technology, with a thesis titled Developing a process for clean shrimp farming using microbial products instead of chemicals. The research aimed to provide a bacterial strain with antibacterial properties to treat shrimp diseases without antibiotics.

In 2017, the General Department of Fisheries of the Ministry of Agriculture and Rural Development recognized this work as a scientific and technological advance in super-intensive farming of whiteleg shrimp. The "Trúc Anh Technology" process involved two-phase super-intensive whiteleg shrimp farming with low water exchange and was officially recognized under Decision 502/QĐ-TCTS-KHCN&HTQT, dated 3 May 2017.

On 30 December 2020, he defended his doctoral thesis entitled Application of Bacillus sp. bacteria against Vibrio parahaemolyticus in industrial shrimp farming at Cần Thơ University. Based on this research, he introduced a product called Kill Para, which is used to treat acute hepatopancreatic necrosis disease and early mortality syndrome in one-month-old shrimp.

== Achievements ==
- Recognized as an outstanding entrepreneur in the local business sector in 2010.
- Awarded the Lương Đình Của Prize for outstanding young producers in 2011.
- Received a certificate of merit from Bạc Liêu Province in 2013 for outstanding achievements in "Studying and Following Ho Chi Minh's Moral Example".
- Received a certificate of merit in 2014 as a member of the 5th term of the Bạc Liêu City Youth Union Committee for contributions to youth union and movement activities during the 2009–2014 term.
- Recognized as an outstanding entrepreneur of the Mekong Delta region in 2014.
- Honored as an "Agricultural Scientist" by the Central Farmers' Association in 2018.
