= Quảng Bình =

- Commune
- Interactive map of Quảng Bình
- Coordinates: 19°40′58″N 105°49′26″E
- Country: Vietnam
- Region: North Central Coast
- Province: Thanh Hóa
- Established: 16 June 2025
- Administrative headquarters: Hiền Tây Hamlet

Area
  - Total: 23.51 km^{2} (9.08 sq mi)

Population (2024)
  - Total: 38,013
  - Density: 1,617/km^{2} (4,190/sq mi)
- Postal code: 42621
- Website: quangbinh.thanhhoa.gov.vn

Quảng Bình is a commune in Thanh Hóa province, Vietnam.

On 16 June 2025, Quảng Xương district was dissolved as part of the 2025 Vietnamese administrative reform, which abolished the district-level administrative system. Quảng Bình Commune was established under Resolution No. 1686/NQ-UBTVQH15 of the Standing Committee of the National Assembly of Vietnam, through the merger of the entire area and population of four communes: Quảng Lưu, Quảng Lộc, Quảng Thái, and Quảng Bình.

Quảng Bình was originally established as a commune of Quảng Xương district in 1954. Following the dissolution of Quảng Xương district on 16 June 2025, the commune became an administrative unit directly under Thanh Hóa province.
