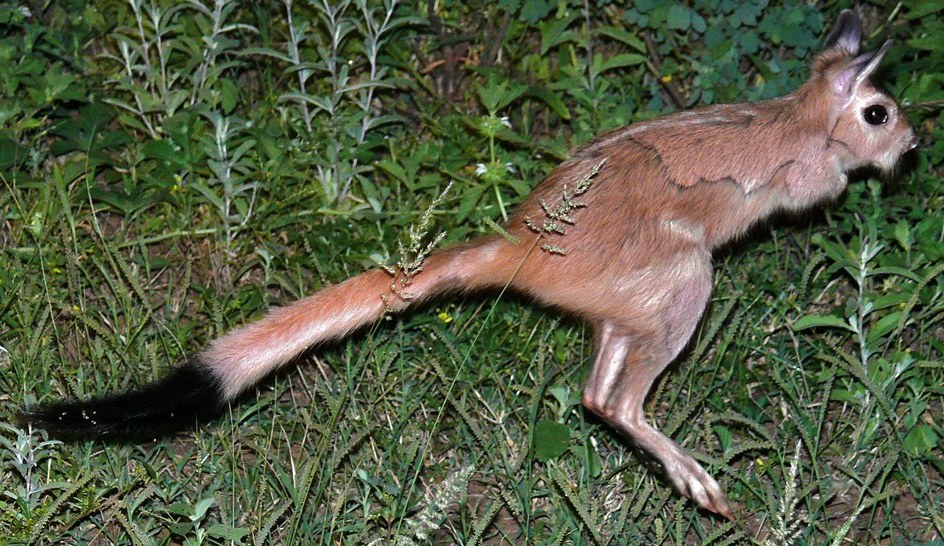
- South African springhare (P. capensis)

Scientific classification
- Kingdom: Animalia
- Phylum: Chordata
- Class: Mammalia
- Order: Rodentia
- Family: Pedetidae
- Genus: Pedetes; Illiger, 1811

Type species
- Yerbua capensis Forster, 1778

Species
- See text
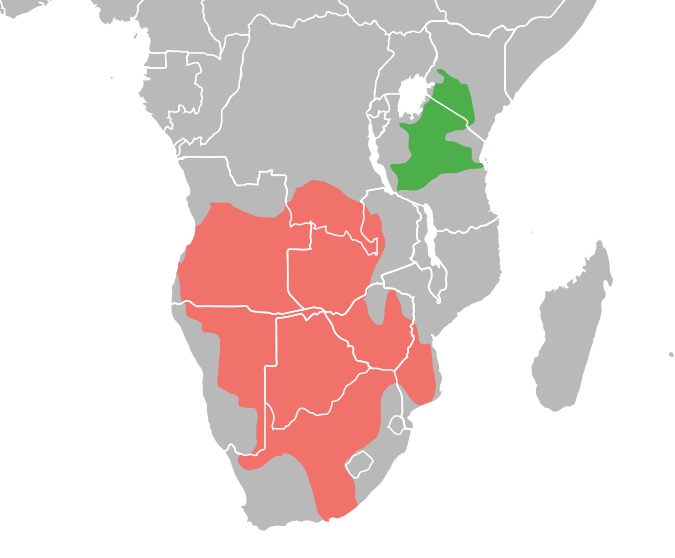
- Pedetidae distribution. P. capensis in red, P. surdaster in green.

= Pedetes =

Springhare Temporal range: Middle Pliocene to Recent3.85–0 Ma

Genus of rodents

Pedetes is a genus of rodent, the springhares, in the family Pedetidae. Members of the genus are distributed across southern and Eastern Africa.

== Species ==
A number of species both extant and extinct are classified in the genus Pedetes. They include:

- South African springhare or springhaas (Pedetes capensis)
- East African springhare (Pedetes surdaster)
- Pedetes laetoliensis (Davies, 1987) (Pliocene fossil)

Throughout the 20th century, the living species (and occasionally the prehistoric one) were merged into P. capensis, making the genus monotypic.

== Ecology ==
These rodents are generally nocturnal and sleep through the day in burrows they dig. They feed on foliage, roots and other vegetable matter, and occasionally arthropods. Outside the burrow they usually move around by hopping on their hind legs.

When only one springhare species was recognized, it was listed as vulnerable by the IUCN in 1996 due to an approximately 20% decrease in the population over the previous ten years. This has been caused by intense hunting and the loss of habitat. However, the negative trend has not persisted, and both species are now listed as Species of Least Concern. The coat of these rodents is known to glow a fluorescent color when viewed under black light.

=== Vocalisations ===
This rodent has a range of vocalisations at its disposal. They can grunt and bleat. They also have a piping contact call.

== See also ==
- Hopping mouse – a similar murid rodent native to Australia; an example of parallel evolution
- Jerboa – a similar dipodid rodent native to northern Africa and Asia
- Jumping mouse – a non-desert-dwelling dipodid rodent native to China and North America
- Kangaroo mouse and kangaroo rat – similar heteromyid rodents of North America
- Kultarr – an unrelated marsupial with a similar body plan and coloration; an example of convergence
