= Hòa Trạch =

Coordinates: 16°18′N 107°59′E

- Commune and village
- Interactive map of Hòa Trạch
- Country: Vietnam
- Province: Quảng Trị
- Time zone: UTC+07:00

Hòa Trạch is a commune (xã) and village in Quảng Trị Province, in Vietnam.

On June 16, 2025, the Standing Committee of the National Assembly issued Resolution No. 1680/NQ-UBTVQH15 on the reorganization of commune-level administrative units in Quảng Trị Province in 2025. Accordingly, the entire natural area and population of Quảng Châu, Quảng Tùng, and Cảnh Dương communes were reorganized to form a new commune named Hòa Trạch Commune.
