= Lưu Vệ =

Lưu Vệ Xã Lưu Vệ
- Commune
- Lưu Vệ commune
- Interactive map of Lưu Vệ
- Coordinates: 19°43′56″N 105°46′54″E
- Country: Vietnam
- Region: North Central Coast
- Province: Thanh Hóa

Area
  - Total: 5.65 sq mi (14.63 km^{2})

Population (2019)
  - Total: 20,603
  - Density: 3,650/sq mi (1,408/km^{2})
- Time zone: UTC+7 (UTC + 7)

Lưu Vệ is a commune of Thanh Hóa Province.
