= Tân Gianh =

- Commune and village
- Location in Vietnam
- Coordinates: 17°46′43″N 106°19′01″E
- Country: Vietnam
- Province: Quảng Trị
- Time zone: UTC+07:00

Tân Gianh is a commune (xã) and village in Quảng Trị Province, in Vietnam.

On June 16, 2025, the Standing Committee of the National Assembly issued Resolution No. 1680/NQ-UBTVQH15 on the reorganization of commune-level administrative units in Quảng Trị Province in 2025. Accordingly, Phù Cảnh Commune, Liên Trường Commune, and Quảng Thanh Commune were merged to form a new commune named Tân Gianh Commune.
