= Quảng Trạch =

- Commune and village
- Interactive map of Quảng Trạch
- Coordinates: 17°48′17″N 106°24′37″E
- Country: Vietnam
- Province: Quảng Trị
- Time zone: UTC+07:00

Quảng Trạch is a commune (xã) and village in Quảng Trị Province, in Vietnam. It is one of the 78 new wards, communes and special zones of the province following the reorganization in 2025.

On June 16, 2025, the Standing Committee of the National Assembly issued Resolution No. 1680/NQ-UBTVQH15 on the reorganization of commune-level administrative units in Quảng Trị Province in 2025. Accordingly, Quảng Phương Commune, Quảng Xuân Commune, and Quảng Hưng Commune were merged to form a new commune named Quảng Trạch Commune.
