= Kim Điền =

- Commune and village
- Interactive map of Kim Điền
- Country: Vietnam
- Province: Quảng Trị
- Time zone: UTC+07:00

Kim Điền [hoa˦ həp˧] is a commune and village in Quảng Trị Province, in Vietnam.

On June 16, 2025, the Standing Committee of the National Assembly issued Resolution No. 1680/NQ-UBTVQH15 on the reorganization of commune-level administrative units in Quảng Trị Province in 2025. Accordingly, Hóa Sơn Commune and Hóa Hợp Commune were merged to form a new commune named Kim Điền Commune.

== Geography ==
Hoa Hop commune is located in the center of Minh Hoa district. To the east, it borders Xuan Hoa commune The West borders on Dan Hoa commune To the south, it borders Hoa Son commune and Trung Hoa commune The North borders with Hoa Tien, Hoa Phuc and Hong Hoa communes.

Hoa Hop commune has an area of 51.84 km^{2}, and its population in 2019 is around 3,560 people with population density reaching 69 people/km^{2}.

Ho Chi Minh Road runs through Hoa Hop commune.

== Administration ==
Hoa Hop commune is divided into 8 villages: Da Nang, Lam Hoa, Lam Khai, Tan Binh, Tan Hoa, Tan Loi, Tan Thuan, Tan Tien.

== Economy ==
The local economy is mainly agriculture and forestry.

== Travel ==
In the commune, there is a scenic spot of Mo Minh Hoa Waterfall on the Khe Ve river, about 400 meters from Ho Chi Minh Road. 17°51′45″N 105°52′21″E. The service is organized into Thac Mo tourist area in Lam Sum village, about 6 km from the administrative center of the commune.
