= Bắc Gianh =

Coordinates: 20°09′N 106°01′E

- Ward
- Interactive map of Bắc Gianh
- Country: Vietnam
- Province: Quảng Trị
- Time zone: UTC+07:00

Bắc Gianh is a ward (phường) of Quảng Trị Province, Vietnam.

On June 16, 2025, the Standing Committee of the National Assembly issued Resolution No. 1680/NQ-UBTVQH15 on the reorganization of commune-level administrative units in Quảng Trị Province in 2025. Accordingly, the entire natural area and population of Quảng Phúc Ward, Quảng Thọ Ward, and Quảng Thuận Ward were reorganized to form a new ward named Bắc Gianh Ward.
