= Thượng Trạch =

Coordinates: 16°48′N 107°15′E

- Commune and village
- Interactive map of Thượng Trạch
- Country: Vietnam
- Province: Quảng Trị
- Time zone: UTC+07:00

Thượng Trạch is a commune (xã) and village in Quảng Trị Province, in the North Central Coast region of Vietnam.

On June 16, 2025, the Standing Committee of the National Assembly issued Resolution No. 1680/NQ-UBTVQH15 on the reorganization of commune-level administrative units in Quảng Trị Province in 2025. Accordingly, Tân Trạch Commune and Thượng Trạch Commune were merged to form a new commune named Thượng Trạch Commune.
