= Tân Thành, Quảng Trị =

Coordinates: 17°52′02″N 105°51′04″E

Tân Thành
- Commune and village
- Interactive map of Tân Thành
- Country: Vietnam
- Province: Quảng Trị
- Time zone: UTC+07:00

Tân Thành is a commune (xã) and village in Quảng Trị Province, in Vietnam.

On December 1, 2024, Hóa Phúc Commune, Hóa Tiến Commune, and Hóa Thanh Commune were merged to form Tân Thành Commune.
