= Minh Hóa =

Coordinates: 17°47′N 106°01′E

- Commune and village
- Interactive map of Minh Hóa
- Country: Vietnam
- Province: Quảng Trị
- Time zone: UTC+07:00

Minh Hóa is a commune (xã) and village in Quảng Trị Province, in Vietnam.

On June 16, 2025, the Standing Committee of the National Assembly issued Resolution No. 1680/NQ-UBTVQH15 on the reorganization of commune-level administrative units in Quảng Trị Province in 2025. Accordingly, the entire natural area and population of Quy Đạt township and the communes of Xuân Hóa, Yên Hóa, and Hồng Hóa were reorganized to form a new commune named Minh Hóa.
