= Quảng Xương district =

Coordinates: 19.717°N 105.700°E

Quảng Xương district Huyện Quảng Xương
- District
- Interactive map of Quảng Xương district
- Country: Vietnam
- Region: North Central Coast
- Province: Thanh Hóa
- Capital: Tân Phong

Area
  - Total: 88 sq mi (228 km^{2})

Population (2012)
  - Total: 245,000
- Time zone: UTC+7 (UTC + 7)

Quảng Xương is a former district (huyện) of Thanh Hóa province in the North Central Coast region of Vietnam.

As of 2012 the district had a population of 245,000. The district covers an area of 228 km^{2} (88 sq mi). The district capital lies at Tân Phong.

== Notable people ==
- Nguyễn Đại Đồng (born 1986), footballer
- Lê Anh Xuân (born 1976), scientist
