= Trung Thuần =

Coordinates: 17.8436°N 106.3461°E

- Commune and village
- Interactive map of Trung Thuần
- Country: Vietnam
- Province: Quảng Trị
- Time zone: UTC+07:00

Trung Thuần is a commune (xã) and village in Quảng Trị Province, in Vietnam.

On June 16, 2025, the Standing Committee of the National Assembly issued Resolution No. 1680/NQ-UBTVQH15 on the reorganization of commune-level administrative units in Quảng Trị Province in 2025. Accordingly, Quảng Lưu Commune, Quảng Thạch Commune, and Quảng Tiến Commune were merged to form a new commune named Trung Thuần Commune.
