= Phú Trạch =

Coordinates: 12°58′N 109°11′E

- Commune and village
- Interactive map of Phú Trạch
- Country: Vietnam
- Province: Quảng Trị
- Time zone: UTC+07:00

Phú Trạch is a commune (xã) and village in Quảng Trị Province, in Vietnam.

On June 16, 2025, the National Assembly Standing Committee issued Resolution No. 1680/NQ-UBTVQH15 on the reorganization of commune-level administrative units in Quảng Trị Province in 2025. Accordingly, the entire natural area and population of Quảng Đông, Quảng Phú, Quảng Kim, and Quảng Hợp communes were consolidated to form a new commune named Phú Trạch Commune.
