= Kim Phú =

Coordinates: 17°46′22″N 106°03′39″E

- Commune and village
- Interactive map of Kim Phú
- Country: Vietnam
- Province: Quảng Trị
- Time zone: UTC+07:00

Kim Phú is a commune (xã) and village in Quảng Trị Province, in Vietnam.

On June 16, 2025, the Standing Committee of the National Assembly issued Resolution No. 1680/NQ-UBTVQH15 on the reorganization of commune-level administrative units in Quảng Trị Province in 2025. Accordingly, Thượng Hóa Commune, Trung Hóa Commune, Minh Hóa Commune, and Tân Hóa Commune were merged to form a new commune named Kim Phú Commune.
