= Ba Đồn =

Ba Đồn Phường Ba Đồn
- Ward
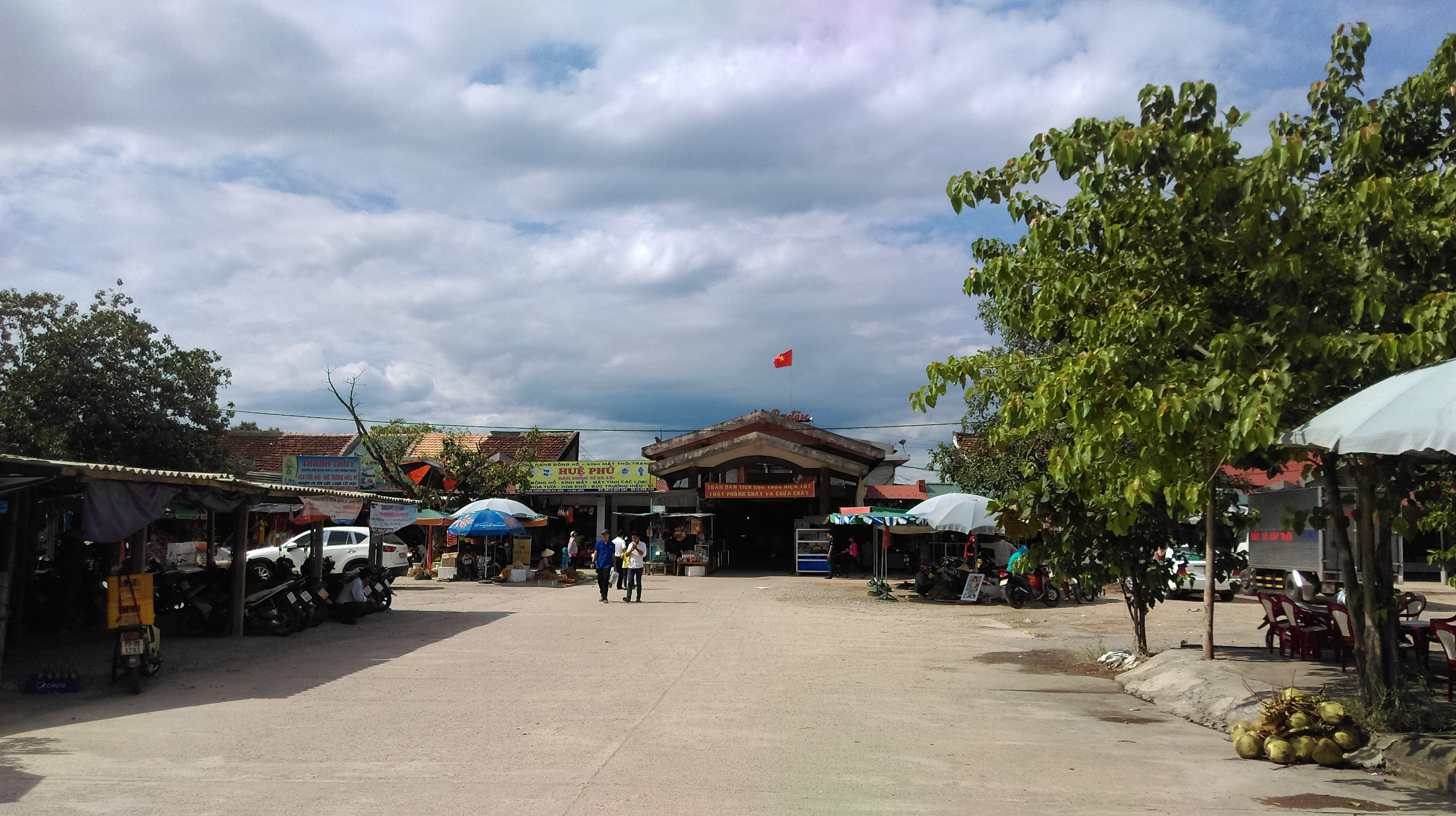
- View of the Cho Ba Don ward.

- Location in Vietnam
- Coordinates: 17°48′N 105°58′E
- Country: Vietnam
- Province: Quảng Trị
- Time zone: UTC+7 (UTC+7)

Ba Đồn is a ward (phường) in Quảng Trị Province, Vietnam. It is one of the 78 new wards, communes and special zones of the province following the reorganization in 2025.

On June 16, 2025, the Standing Committee of the National Assembly issued Resolution No. 1680/NQ-UBTVQH15 on the arrangement of commune-level administrative units in Quảng Trị province in 2025. Accordingly, the entire natural area and population of Quảng Phong Ward, Quảng Long Ward, Ba Đồn Ward, and Quảng Hải Commune were merged to form a new ward named Ba Đồn Ward.
