= Dân Hóa =

Dân Hoá
- Commune and village
- Country: Vietnam
- Province: Quảng Trị
- Time zone: UTC+07:00

Dân Hoá is a commune (xã) and village in Quảng Trị Province, Vietnam.

On June 16, 2025, the Standing Committee of the National Assembly issued Resolution No. 1680/NQ-UBTVQH15 on the reorganization of commune-level administrative units in Quảng Trị Province in 2025. Accordingly, Trọng Hóa Commune and Dân Hóa Commune were merged to form a new commune named Dân Hóa Commune.
