= Đồng Hới (city) =

Đồng Hới Thành phố Đồng Hới Động Hải
- Provincial city (Class-2)
- Đồng Hới City; Thành phố Đồng Hới
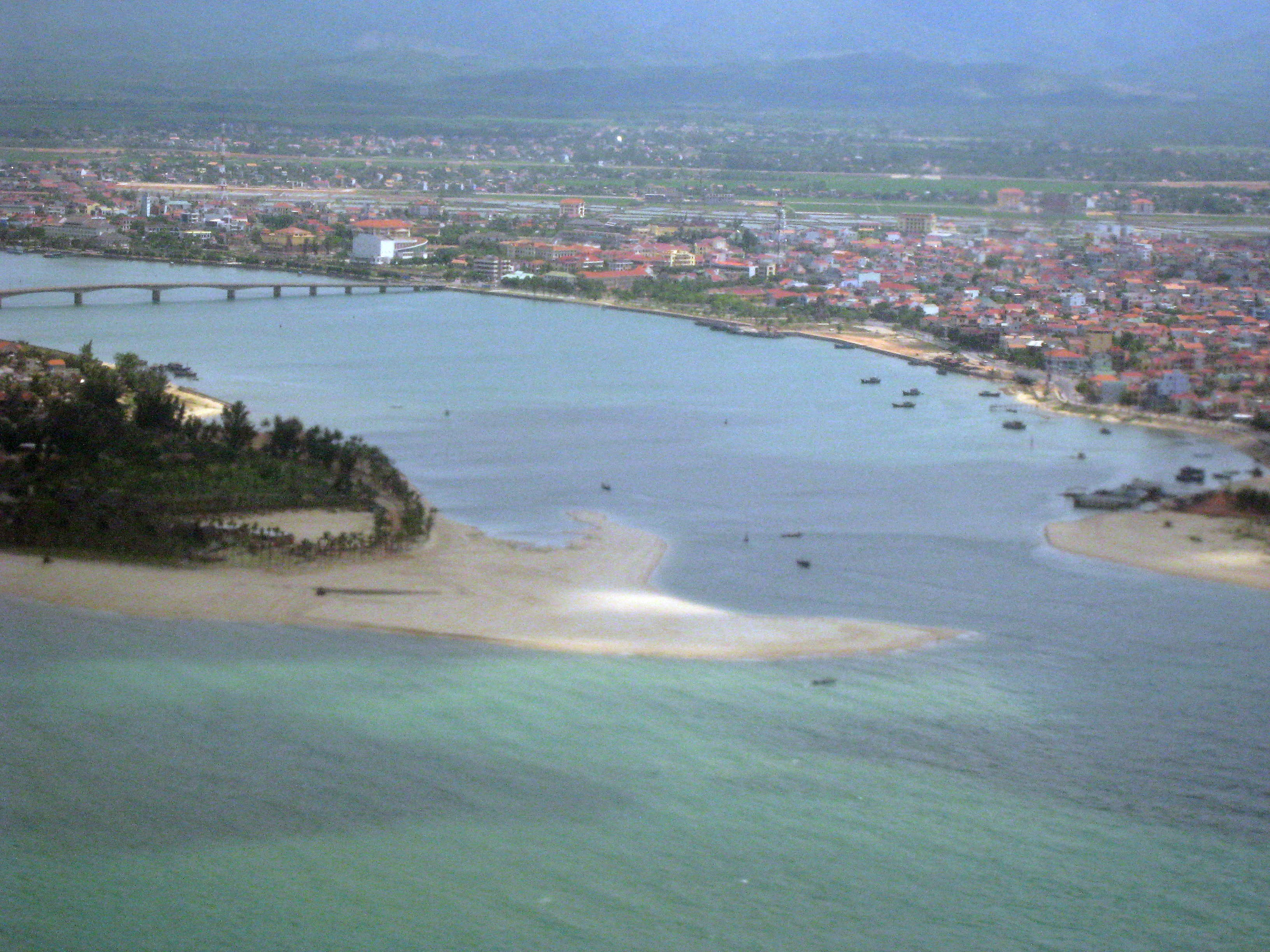
- Aerial view of the city with Nhật Lệ River flow into its mouth at South China Sea
- Nickname: City of Roses
- Interactive map of Đồng Hới
- Location in Vietnam
- Coordinates: 17°28′59″N 106°35′59″E
- Country: Vietnam
- Province: Quảng Trị

Government
  - Type: City municipality

Area
  - Provincial city (Class-2): 155.71 km^{2} (60.12 sq mi)

Population (2019 census)
  - Provincial city (Class-2): 133,672
  - Density: 858.47/km^{2} (2,223.4/sq mi)
  - Urban: 91,601 (69%)
- Time zone: UTC+7 (Vietnam)
- Airport: Đồng Hới Airport (domestic)
- Climate: Am

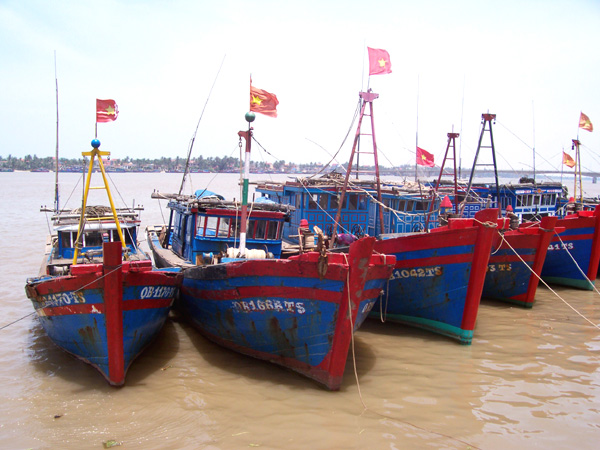
Fishing boats in Đồng Hới.

Đồng Hới is the former capital city of Quảng Bình Province in the North Central Coast of Vietnam. The city's area is 155.71 km^{2} (60.12 sq mi). Population as per the 2019 census was 133,672. It is served by National Highway 1A, the Đồng Hới Railway Station, and airport. By road, Đồng Hới is 486 kilometres (302 mi) south of Hanoi, 195 kilometres (121 mi) south of Vinh, 160 kilometres (99 mi) north of Huế and 1,204 kilometres (748 mi) north of Ho Chi Minh City. It borders Quảng Ninh District on the west and south, the South China Sea on the east, Bố Trạch District on the north.

Đồng Hới has a 12-km-long coastline with white sand beaches. It is the closest city to Phong Nha–Kẻ Bàng National Park, UNESCO's World Natural Heritage Site, 50 km north.

== History ==
Archaeological excavation in this area proved that humans lived in what is now Quảng Bình province in the Stone Age. Many artifacts, such as ceramic vases, stone tools, and china, have been unearthed in Quảng Bình.

In 1926, French archaeologist Madeleine Colani discovered and excavated many artifacts in caves and grottoes in west mountainous areas of Quảng Bình. She concluded that the Hòa Bình culture existed in this region. Through C14 testing, the artifacts dated back to 10,509 (plus or minus 950) years ago. From Quy Đạt township (Tuyên Hóa District) to south-west about 150 m, the Hum grotto contains many stone tools and animal stones from an ancient human community. Inside Khai grotto near the Quy Đạt township, similar artifacts were found, including ceramics from Đông Sơn culture. Additionally, artifacts of the Stone Age were unearthed in grottoes in the Quảng Bình region. Owners of these artifacts lived in the caves and grottoes and hunted for their food.

Human settlement in Đồng Hới can be traced 5,000 years back. Many relics and remnants have been found in Bau Tro, a lake in the city, most of which date to the Stone Age. Around 2880 BC, the site of modern Đồng Hới was a territory of the Viet Thuong tribe of Văn Lang during the reign of king Hùng Vương. The site was a long-disputed territory between the Champa kingdom and Đại Việt. It officially became Đại Việt territory in 1069 after Lý Thường Kiệt took victory over Champa as a result of the Đại Việt-Champa War (1069).

The area ceased to be the southernmost of Đại Việt following the political marriage of the Trần dynasty princess, Huyền Trân, to Champa king, Jaya Sinhavarman III (Vietnamese: Chế Mân). Princess Huyền Trân was king Trần Nhân Tông's daughter and king Trần Anh Tông's younger sister. Political matches made to acquire land was a traditional practice by Champa kings. Thanks to this marriage, Đại Việt acquired lands (as dowry) of what is now Quảng Trị Province and Huế city (provinces which were then known respectively as Chau O and Chau Ri or Chau Ly).

During the time of the Trịnh–Nguyễn War (1558–1775), Vietnam was divided into two countries: Dang Trong (South) and Dang Ngoai (North) with the Gianh River as frontier line. Đồng Hới was an important fortress of the southern Nguyễn lords. The Đồng Hới Wall (Vietnamese: Thành Đồng Hới) was considered the barrier that protected the Nguyễn lords from the attack by the northern Trịnh family.

During the First Indochina War (between the French and the Viet Minh in the 1950s), the Đồng Hới airbase was used by the French to attack the Viet Minh in north-central Vietnam and the Laotian Pathet Lao army in central and southern Laos. During the Vietnam War, Đồng Hới was heavily devastated by bombardments from United States B-52 bombers due to its location near the 17th parallel and the DMZ between North Vietnam and South Vietnam.

On February 11, 1965, bombing destroyed much of the city. The Tam Tòa Church, a Catholic cathedral, was severely damaged. Today the bell tower remains near the town center as a monument.

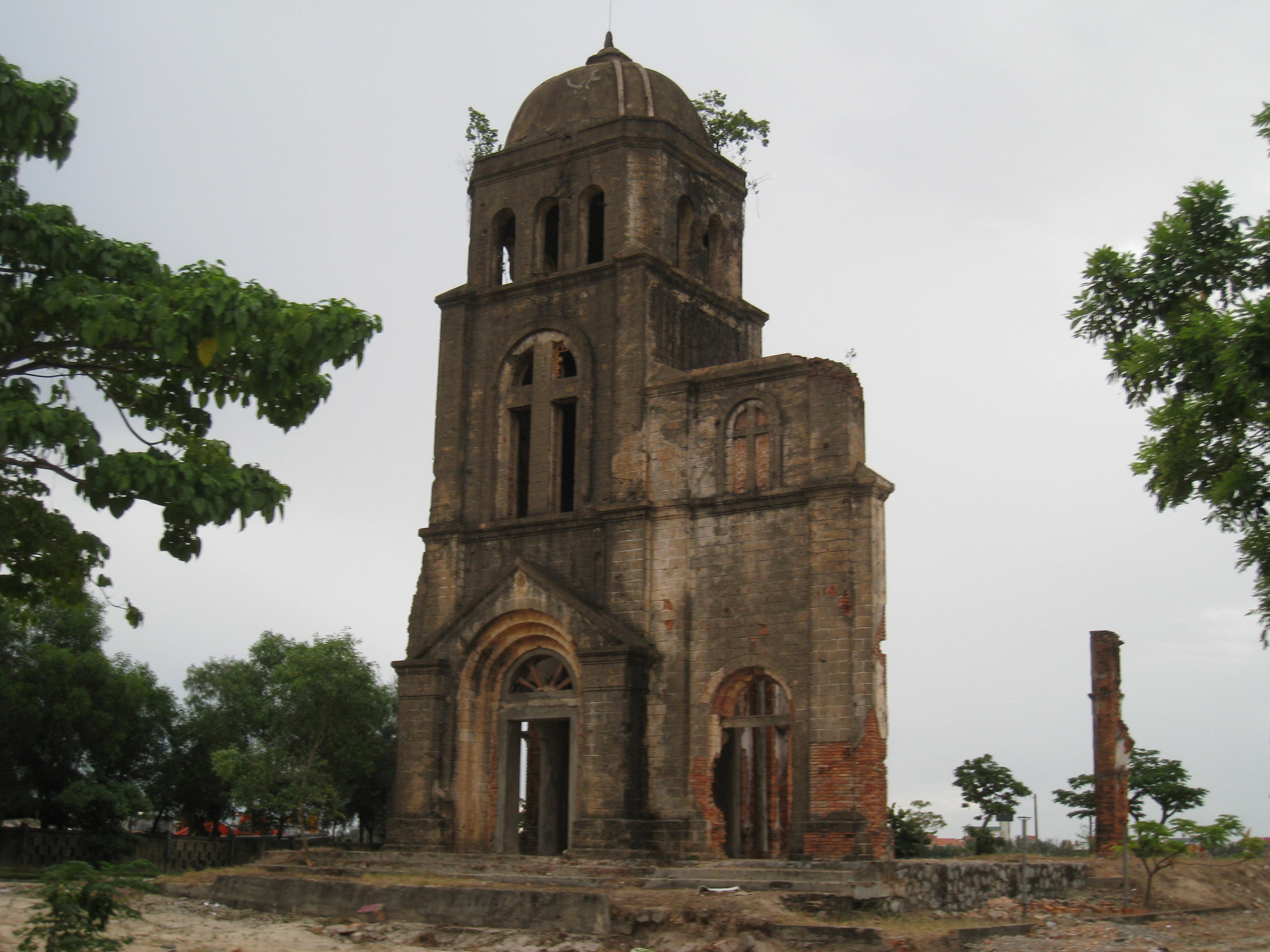
Ruins of Tam Tòa Church.

On 19 April 1972, during a major North Vietnam offensive, a task force of four US ships were sailing off the coast of Vietnam — USS Oklahoma City, USS Sterett, USS Lloyd Thomas and USS Higbee. They were attacked by three North Vietnamese MiG aircraft in the Battle of Đồng Hới. In an attempt to surprise the task force, the MiGs came in low, described as "getting their feet wet." Despite the official stories, they did not surprise the task force, which had spotted them long before engagement range and were ready to shoot. Two ships, Oklahoma City and Sterett, had anti-aircraft missiles, while Higbee and Lloyd Thomas were armed with dual purpose 5-inch (127 mm) guns. All ships were at battle stations.

This city is the narrowest land of Vietnam (around 40 km from the east to the west). After the fall of Saigon on 30 April 1975, Quảng Bình province was merged into Bình Trị Thiên province (Bình Trị Thiên is the abbreviation of Quảng Bình, Quảng Trị, and Thừa Thiên provinces). In 1990, Bình Trị Thiên was once again separated into three provinces as it had been before. Đồng Hới then became the capital of Quảng Bình province.

== Geography ==
=== Location ===
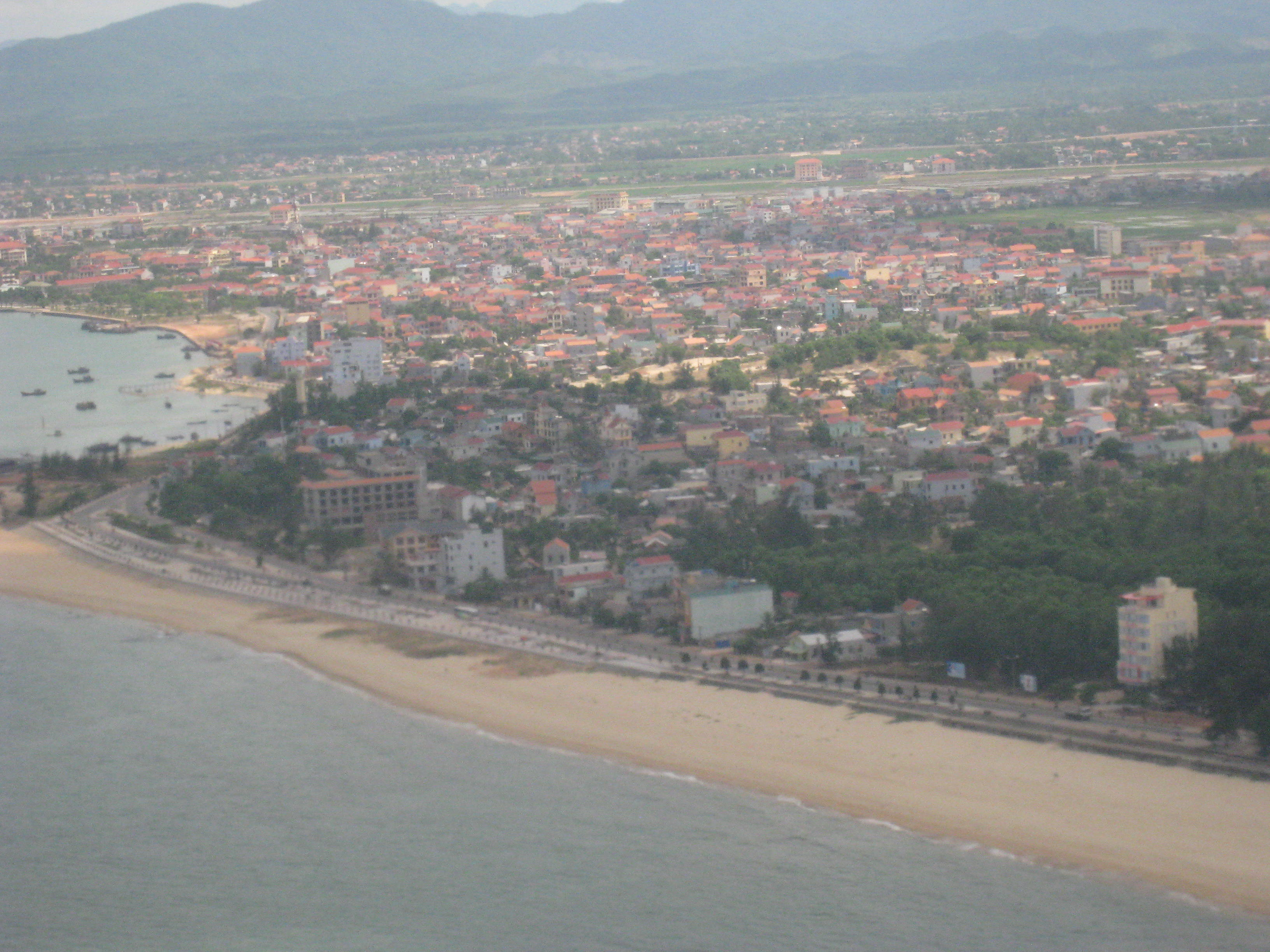
Đồng Hới seen from the air

Đồng Hới is on the National Route 1, North–South Railway, and Ho Chi Minh Highway, at the coordinates 17 21' N and 106 10’ E. This city is in the heart of Quảng Bình Province. It borders Bố Trạch on the north, Quảng Ninh on the south, the South China Sea on the east and Quảng Ninh on the west. It is 50 km south of Phong Nha–Kẻ Bàng National Park, 50 km north of Bang Spa, 180 km south-east of Cha Lo border gate with Laos. It has a coastline of 12 km. Nhật Lệ River is the only river that runs through the city. Tro Lake is the source of fresh water. The Nhật Lệ Beach is endowed with fine and white sand.

== Climate ==
Like all provinces in north and north central Vietnam, there are four distinct seasons in Đồng Hới. Despite these distinct seasons, and an annual temperature range of 11.0 °C or 19.8 °F, Đồng Hới still has a tropical monsoon climate (Köppen Am) as the mean temperature of the coolest month is 18.8 °C or 65.8 °F. The average annual temperature is 24.7 °C or 76.5 °F, average rainfall varies from 1,300 to 4,000 millimetres or 50 to 160 inches, total sunshine hours per year is 1,783 hours, and average annual humidity is around 82%. The city sees three types of wind: south-east (gió nồm), south-west (gió Lào), and north-east.

In the “spring”, Đồng Hới is very warm, humid and foggy. Although the city is by the sea, its climate is subject to drought and heat in the summer. This is largely due to the dry south-west wind from Gulf of Thailand. This flow of wind is wet but when it passes onto Vietnam, the Annamite Range releases its moisture to cause rains in Laos but drought in central Vietnam. It is rainy in the northeast monsoon (“fall”) and the weather is very warm (26 to 31 °C or 78.8 to 87.8 °F) although with extremely high relative humidity due to the moist air from the northeast monsoon. In the winter, due to the north-east wind blowing from the Siberia mainland, the temperature may go down below 18 °C or 64.4 °F, and there may be slight rain. The highest rainfall occurs in October (649 millimetres or 25.6 inches), compared to just 39 millimetres or 1.5 inches in Februarys. The highest temperature recorded was 43.2 °C on 30 April 2024, while the lowest was 6.7 °C on 24 January 2016.

Climate data for Đồng Hới
Month	Jan	Feb	Mar	Apr	May	Jun	Jul	Aug	Sep	Oct	Nov	Dec	Year
Record high °C (°F)	34.7 (94.5)	37.2 (99.0)	39.8 (103.6)	43.2 (109.8)	42.2 (108.0)	41.8 (107.2)	40.9 (105.6)	41.5 (106.7)	40.9 (105.6)	37.4 (99.3)	35.0 (95.0)	29.8 (85.6)	43.2 (109.8)
Mean daily maximum °C (°F)	21.7 (71.1)	22.3 (72.1)	24.9 (76.8)	28.8 (83.8)	32.4 (90.3)	34.0 (93.2)	33.9 (93.0)	33.1 (91.6)	30.9 (87.6)	28.2 (82.8)	25.5 (77.9)	22.6 (72.7)	28.2 (82.8)
Daily mean °C (°F)	18.8 (65.8)	19.5 (67.1)	21.7 (71.1)	24.9 (76.8)	28.1 (82.6)	29.8 (85.6)	29.8 (85.6)	29.0 (84.2)	27.1 (80.8)	25.1 (77.2)	22.6 (72.7)	19.8 (67.6)	24.7 (76.5)
Mean daily minimum °C (°F)	16.7 (62.1)	17.6 (63.7)	19.7 (67.5)	22.4 (72.3)	25.0 (77.0)	26.8 (80.2)	26.7 (80.1)	26.0 (78.8)	24.3 (75.7)	22.5 (72.5)	20.3 (68.5)	17.6 (63.7)	21.1 (70.0)
Record low °C (°F)	6.7 (44.1)	8.0 (46.4)	8.0 (46.4)	11.7 (53.1)	15.1 (59.2)	19.2 (66.6)	20.5 (68.9)	19.9 (67.8)	17.8 (64.0)	14.6 (58.3)	12.0 (53.6)	7.8 (46.0)	6.7 (44.1)
Average rainfall mm (inches)	59.4 (2.34)	39.9 (1.57)	43.2 (1.70)	60.8 (2.39)	115.6 (4.55)	78.9 (3.11)	75.5 (2.97)	166.1 (6.54)	472.5 (18.60)	649.1 (25.56)	318.7 (12.55)	125.1 (4.93)	2,189.7 (86.21)
Average rainy days	11.8	11.2	11.3	9.2	10.1	7.3	7.2	11.0	15.8	19.3	17.4	14.2	145.2
Average relative humidity (%)	87.5	89.4	89.0	86.7	79.5	72.2	70.6	75.3	83.5	86.0	85.3	85.4	82.5
Mean monthly sunshine hours	89.9	74.5	106.3	159.1	232.8	224.3	234.6	198.1	168.1	129.2	95.6	73.3	1,783.9
Source 1: Vietnam Institute for Building Science and Technology
Source 2: The Yearbook of Indochina

=== Topography and geology ===
The city has diverse topographical and geological features, including hill, mountainous, half mountainous, coastal plains and coastal sand dunes.

The hilly region is in the west, stretching from north to south (in parts of communes: Dong Son, Thuan Duc) with an average elevation of 12–15 m, with total area of 64.93 km^{2}, 41.7% of the city total area. Residents here live on agriculture, forestry, farming. The soil in this area is poor in nutrition, infertile and subject to continuous erosion due to its slope of 7-10%.

The half hilly region surrounds a plain with an average elevation of 10 m from north-east - north to north-west – south-west and south – south-east. This region covers communes and wards of Bắc Lý, Nam Lý, Nghĩa Ninh, Bắc Nghĩa, Đức Ninh, Đức Ninh Đông, Lộc Ninh and Phú Hải with total area of 62.87 km^{2}, or accounts for 40.2% of the city total area. Residents here lives on industrial, handcraft, trading and a small percentage lives on farming. This region is not very fertile, subject to alum. However, thanks to the heavy distribution of rivers and lakes, ponds and pools, it's better for agriculture than the hilly region. The plain with the average of 2.1 m, with little slope, accounting for 0.2% of the city area (5.76 km^{2}). Most of the city's commercial, administrative and main streets concentrate in this narrow regions. Coastal sand dune area is on the east of the city, with an area of 21.98 km^{2}, making up 14,3% of the total area.

== Administration ==
Đồng Hới is subdivided into 15 subdivisions:9 urban wards (phường) and 6 rural communes (xã).

List of administrative units under Đồng Hới city

Name	Area (km^{2})	Population 2020	Population size (pop/km^{2})
Ward: (9)
Bắc Lý	9,95	22.771	2.289
Bắc Nghĩa	7,49	8.747	1.168
Đồng Hải	1,93	6.122	3.172
Đồng Phú	3,82	10.937	2.886
Đồng Sơn	19,55	9.432	482
Đức Ninh Đông	2,78	6.325	2.275
Hải Thành	2,45	6.615	2.700
Nam Lý	4,01	17.926	4.437
Phú Hải	3,13	4.382	1.400

Name	Area (km^{2})	Population 2020	Population size (pop/km^{2})
Commune: (6)
Bảo Ninh	17,67	10.798	611
Đức Ninh	5,56	9.153	1.646
Lộc Ninh	13,32	9.557	717
Nghĩa Ninh	15,70	5.463	348
Quang Phú	3,22	3.205	995
Thuận Đức	45,30	4.645	103

Source: Statistical yearbook of Đồng Hới 2020

On March 19, 2025, Dong Hoi City submitted to the Provincial People's Committee for consideration of rearranging administrative units from 15 communes and wards to 3 wards, and at the same time expanding the administrative boundaries to 221km2, accordingly:

- The first ward plans to merge the communes and wards: Đồng Hải, Đồng Phú, Hải Thành, Đức Ninh, Đức Ninh Đông, Phú Hải, Bảo Ninh and proposes to expand the boundaries to Quán Hàu town, Lương Ninh commune, Quảng Ninh district.
- The second ward plans to merge the communes and wards: Nam Lý, Bắc Lý, Lộc Ninh, Quang Phú and proposes to expand the boundaries to Nam Trạch commune and part of Nhân Trạch commune (Bố Trạch district).
- The third ward is expected to merge the communes and wards: Nghĩa Ninh, Đồng Sơn, Bắc Nghĩa, Thuận Đức and propose to expand the boundary to Vĩnh Ninh commune, Quảng Ninh district.

The expansion of the administrative boundary of Đồng Hới city aims to create more space for development, reduce pressure on the central area, help meet the criteria on population, area size and necessary infrastructure to aim for the goal of becoming a Provincial city (Class-1) urban area.

== Tourism ==
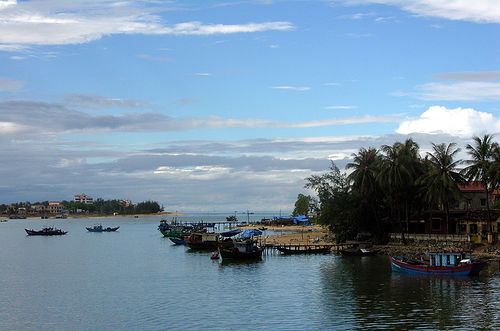
Nhật Lệ River

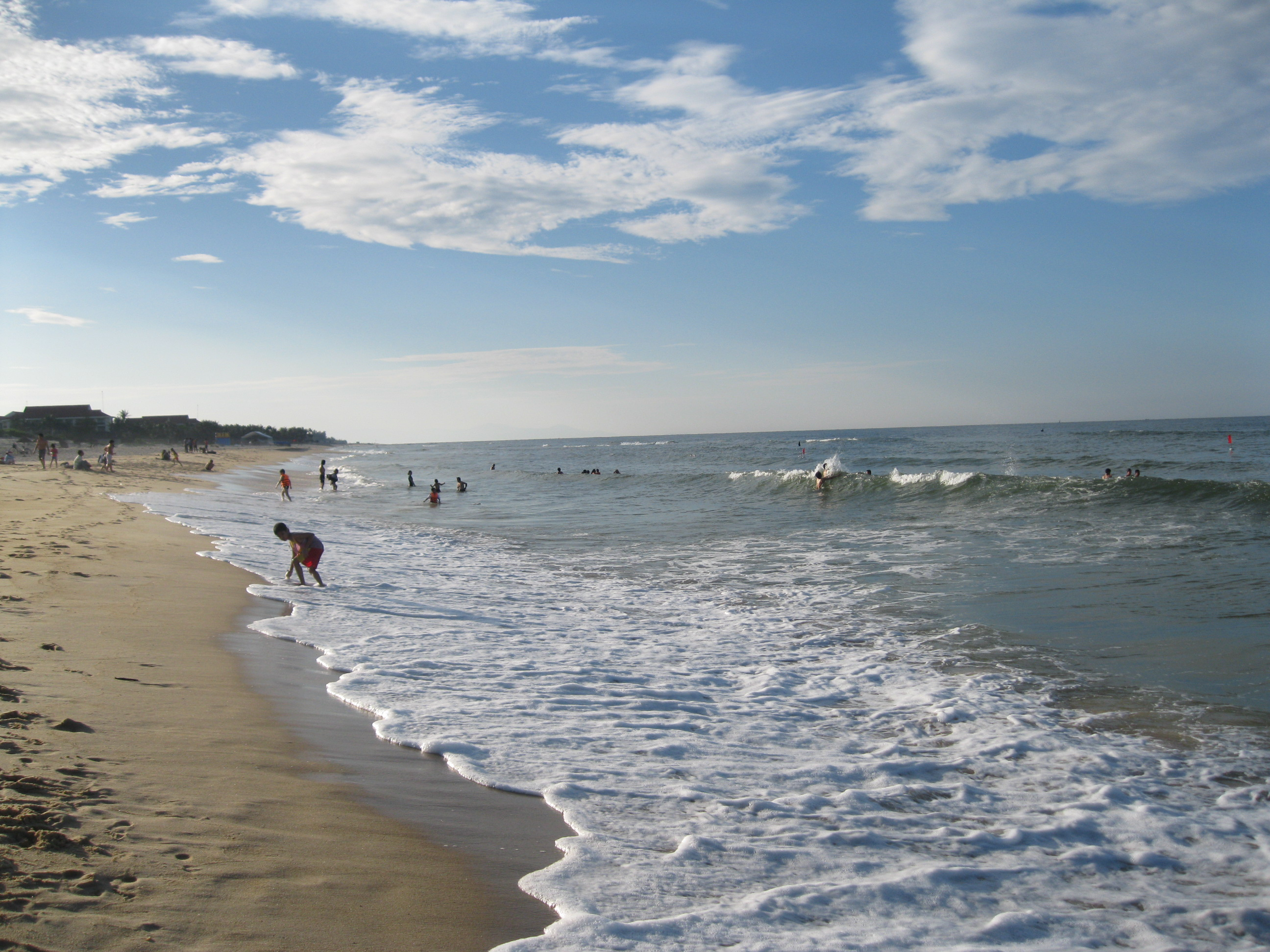
Bảo Ninh Beach

- Đồng Hới is endowed with beautiful beaches with fine sand and clean water of Nhật Lệ. The Da Nhay and Ly Hoa beaches (60 km north of the city) are popular tourist destinations. The Bang Spa (hot mineral spring) is ideal for those who enjoy spa baths. The city is 50 km south of the World Heritage Phong Nha–Kẻ Bàng National Park which is ideal for cave and grotto exploration and biological research activities (mainly Phong Nha Cave and, from September 2010, Thiên Đường Cave and Sơn Đoòng Cave are available for visitors).
- Đồng Hới is included in former battlefield tours where travelers can visit once-dangerous fields along the Annamite Range and the Hồ Chí Minh trail.
- The city provides tourists with 98 hotels and guest-houses from 1 to 4-star hotels. The cuisine includes seafood, the traditional "hot pot", Vietnamese and European-style meals. In 2005, the city welcomed nearly 300,000 visitors.
- Flagstick broke ground on another new project on February 1 – FLC Dong Hoi Golf Links in Quang Binh Province. A complex of 10 contiguous golf courses, three clubhouses, more than 1,000 villas, a large resort hotel, commercial village and convention centre is under construction in seaside area of Dong Hoi and Quang Ninh District, Le Thuy District, which is scheduled to achieve the completion of all construction of the first phase by November 2016, with spring 2017 set as the opening date for play.

== Transport ==
Đồng Hới has a diverse system of roads, railways, waterways and airways, including:

=== Roads ===
- National Route 9E
- National Route 15
- National Route 1
- Ho Chi Minh Highway
- , Bung–Van Ninh Expressway (Expected completion date is April 30, 2025)

=== Railways ===
- Đồng Hới station: 522 km south of Hanoi station and located on the North–South railway. Dong Hoi station is one of the eight main stations in the country, with a large number of passengers.

=== Waterways ===
- Nhật Lệ port

=== Air ===
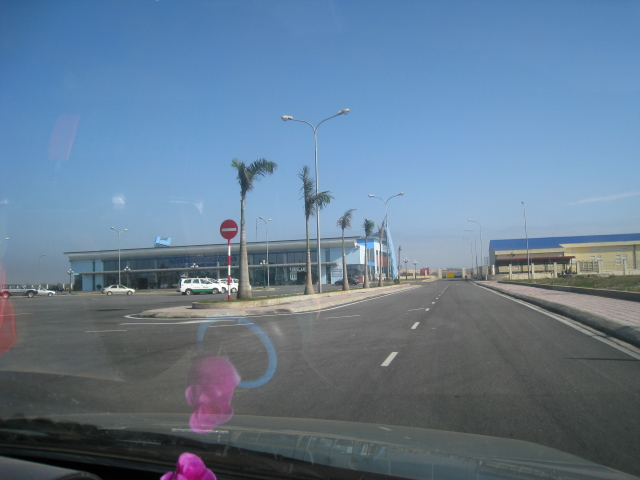
Đồng Hới Airport

Đồng Hới Airport was put into use on 18 May 2008, and the first commercial flight was from Hanoi's Noi Bai International Airport, followed by air link with Ho Chi Minh City's Tân Sơn Nhất International Airport from 1 July 2009.

== Education ==
According to 2016 statistics, the city has 46 general schools (23 primary schools, 17 secondary schools, 5 high schools, 1 secondary school), 19 preschool schools, and 1 university school.

- List of high schools in Đồng Hới
1. Võ Nguyên Giáp Gifted High School
2. Đào Duy Từ High School
3. Phan Đình Phùng High School
4. Đồng Hới High School
5. Quang Binh Province Ethnic Minority High School
6. Chu Van An Secondary and High School (Private)

Đồng Hới is home to Quảng Bình University, a multidisciplinary university.

== See also ==
- Đồng Hới Citadel
