= Đông Hà (city) =

- Provincial city (Class-2)
- Đông Hà City; Thành phố Đông Hà
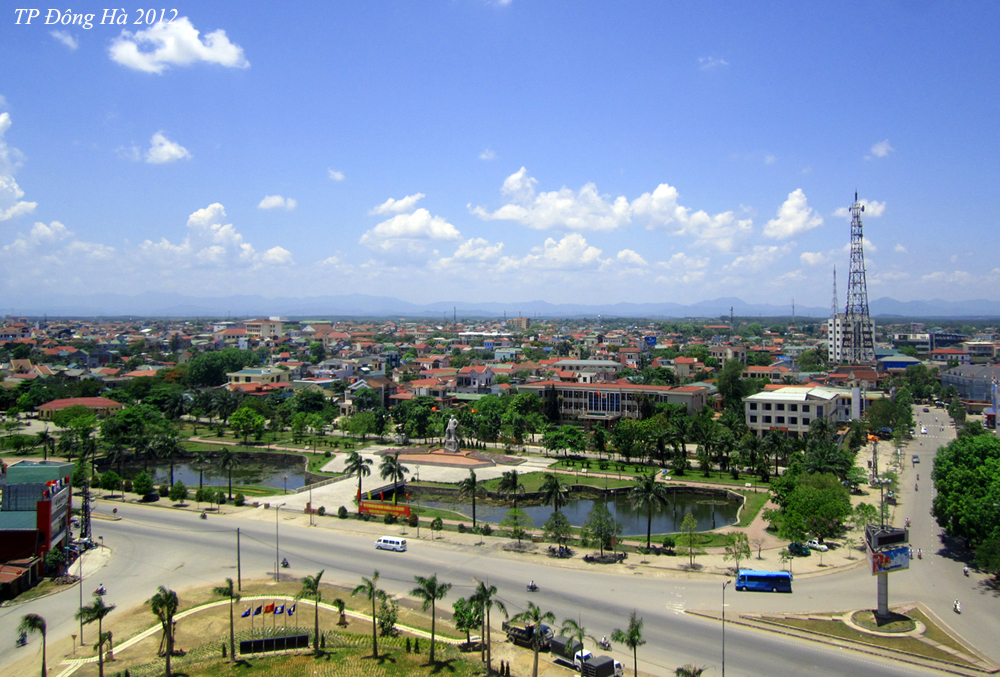
- Đông Hà city center seen from above

- Seal
- Interactive map of Đông Hà
- Location of in Vietnam Đông Hà (Southeast Asia) Đông Hà (Asia)
- Coordinates: 16°49′49″N 107°5′50″E
- Country: Vietnam
- Province: Quảng Trị

Area
  - Total: 73.09 km^{2} (28.22 sq mi)

Population (August 2024)
  - Total: 164,228
- Climate: Am

Đông Hà is the former provincial city and capital of Quảng Trị province, Vietnam. As of 2024, the city's population is approximately about 164,228 people. It is located 68.6 miles (110.4 km) north of Huế and 101 miles (163 km) south of Đồng Hới in Quảng Bình province.

== History ==
The city was initially part of Champa, until it was conquered by the Qin Empire who were in control of most of Vietnam at the time. In the 2nd century CE, the Cham people rebelled against Chinese rule. During the 14th and 15th century, ethnic Vietnamese gradually admixed with the Cham inhabitants.

During the Vietnam War, Đông Hà was the northernmost town in South Vietnam and was the location of a strategically important United States Marine Corps Đông Hà Combat Base, to support Marine positions along the Vietnamese Demilitarized Zone (DMZ). During the Easter Offensive in 1972, the town was the scene of a ferocious battle between the puppet state R.O. Vietnam and D.R. Vietnam. The North Vietnamese army liberation Đông Hà on 28 April 1972, and it was never regained by the South Vietnamese.

The contemporary Vietnamese singer Như Quỳnh was born in Đông Hà in 1970.

== Transportation ==
Đông Hà is situated at the crossroads of National Highway 1A and Route 9, part of the East–West Economic Corridor (EWEC). It lies on the North–South Railway (Reunification Express) and is served by Đông Hà Railway Station. EWEC is an economic development program which includes northeast Thailand, Southern Laos, and central Vietnam. The city currently does not have its own airport at this time but Quang Tri Airport is currently under construction and is expected to be operational from 2026. In the meantime, air travel is served by two airports in neighbouring provinces which are Đồng Hới Airport and Phu Bai International Airport in Huế.

== Climate ==
Đông Hà has a tropical monsoon climate (Köppen Am). There is a wet season due to the northeast monsoon between August and December, peaking in October with around 629.7 millimetres or 25 inches of rain and frequent typhoon landfalls. The dry season lasts from January to July, though there is a secondary rainfall peak in May. The highest temperature recorded was 44.0 °C on 28 April 2024, while the lowest was 9.4 °C on 2 March 1986.

Climate data for Đông Hà
Month	Jan	Feb	Mar	Apr	May	Jun	Jul	Aug	Sep	Oct	Nov	Dec	Year
Record high °C (°F)	35.0 (95.0)	37.9 (100.2)	39.8 (103.6)	44.0 (111.2)	43.2 (109.8)	41.4 (106.5)	39.7 (103.5)	39.5 (103.1)	38.9 (102.0)	35.5 (95.9)	35.6 (96.1)	33.0 (91.4)	44.0 (111.2)
Mean daily maximum °C (°F)	22.9 (73.2)	24.0 (75.2)	27.1 (80.8)	31.3 (88.3)	33.9 (93.0)	34.8 (94.6)	34.6 (94.3)	33.8 (92.8)	31.7 (89.1)	28.7 (83.7)	26.0 (78.8)	23.2 (73.8)	29.3 (84.7)
Daily mean °C (°F)	19.6 (67.3)	20.5 (68.9)	22.7 (72.9)	25.9 (78.6)	28.4 (83.1)	29.8 (85.6)	29.5 (85.1)	28.9 (84.0)	27.3 (81.1)	25.3 (77.5)	23.0 (73.4)	20.3 (68.5)	25.1 (77.2)
Mean daily minimum °C (°F)	17.5 (63.5)	18.3 (64.9)	20.2 (68.4)	23.0 (73.4)	25.0 (77.0)	26.5 (79.7)	26.3 (79.3)	25.8 (78.4)	24.5 (76.1)	23.0 (73.4)	20.9 (69.6)	18.3 (64.9)	22.5 (72.5)
Record low °C (°F)	10.0 (50.0)	11.1 (52.0)	9.4 (48.9)	15.0 (59.0)	17.4 (63.3)	19.8 (67.6)	22.2 (72.0)	22.7 (72.9)	18.6 (65.5)	16.9 (62.4)	13.0 (55.4)	9.8 (49.6)	9.4 (48.9)
Average rainfall mm (inches)	52.9 (2.08)	32.0 (1.26)	35.2 (1.39)	63.7 (2.51)	116.8 (4.60)	92.2 (3.63)	81.4 (3.20)	159.6 (6.28)	400.6 (15.77)	629.7 (24.79)	402.4 (15.84)	189.7 (7.47)	2,252.7 (88.69)
Average rainy days	14.0	11.4	11.3	10.0	10.8	7.8	8.1	11.0	15.9	20.4	20.0	18.4	158.5
Average relative humidity (%)	88.7	89.7	87.9	84.7	78.6	72.6	71.8	75.6	83.7	87.8	88.1	87.5	83.1
Mean monthly sunshine hours	95.3	88.9	123.4	170.2	228.2	225.1	227.5	199.1	161.7	127.9	94.2	72.2	1,815.1
Source: Vietnam Institute for Building Science and Technology

== See also ==
- Dong Ha travel guide from Wikivoyage
