= Quang Tri Airport =

Planned airport in Gio Linh District, Vietnam

Quảng Trị Airport Cảng hàng không Quảng Trị
- IATA: AQT; ICAO: unknown

Summary
- Airport type: Public
- Operator: Middle Airports Authority
- Serves: Đông Hà
- Location: Gio Linh Commune
- Coordinates: 17°00′55″N 106°35′28″E

Map
- Location within Vietnam

Runways
Direction	Length		Surface
Direction	ft	m	Surface
unknown		2,400	?

Quảng Trị Airport (Vietnamese language: Sân bay Quảng Trị) is a military/civil under construction in the province of Quảng Trị, Vietnam, around 560 km south of Hanoi. The airport will be located in the commune of Gio Linh, 7 km north of the ward of Đông Hà. The master plan was signed by the chairman of the Quảng Trị provincial people's committee. The investment cost is estimated VND 374.787 billion (equivalent to US$27 million). The airport is expected to be operational from 2026. The airport will cover 290 hectares, 93 km south of Đồng Hới Airport and 88 km north Phu Bai International Airport by road (National Route 1).
