= Long Đại River =

River in Vietnam

The Long Đại River (Vietnamese: Sông Long Đại) is a river in Quảng Ninh District of Quảng Bình Province, North Central Coast region of Vietnam. The river originates in the Annamite Range and flows generally northeastwards. Its total length is 77 km (48 mi). The Long Đại River creates a narrow fertile plain by its banks. Then it meets the Kiến Giang River, and together they form the Nhật Lệ River. The Nhật Lệ River flows generally northeastwards before emptying into South China Sea at Đồng Hới. The Long Đại River used to cause flooding in the rainy season (from September to December). However, the severe flooding has been prevented thanks to the dam at its headstreams.

== External links and references ==
- Rivers in Quang Binh Province on Official Website of Quang Binh government
