= Dong Son =

Dong Son may refer to several places in Vietnam, including:

== Đông Sơn ==
- Đông Sơn District, a rural district of Thanh Hóa Province
- Đông Sơn, Thanh Hóa City, a ward of Thanh Hóa city
- Đông Sơn, Bỉm Sơn, a ward of Bỉm Sơn in Thanh Hóa Province
- Đông Sơn, Hanoi, a commune of Chương Mỹ District
- Đông Sơn, Haiphong, a commune of Thủy Nguyên District
- Đông Sơn, Ninh Bình, a commune of Tam Điệp
- Đông Sơn, Thừa Thiên-Huế, a commune of A Lưới District
- Đông Sơn, Nghệ An, a commune of Đô Lương District
- Đông Sơn, Thái Bình, a commune of Đông Hưng District
- Đông Sơn, Bắc Giang, a commune of Yên Thế District
- Đông Sơn village, a village in Thanh Hóa city

== Đồng Sơn ==
- Đồng Sơn: ward in Quảng Trị province.
- Đồng Sơn: commune in Đồng Tháp province.

== See also ==
- Đông Sơn culture, the Bronze Age culture of the area that would later become Vietnam
- Đông Sơn drums, major artifacts of the culture
