= Dong Hoi Airport =

Airport in Vietnam

Dong Hoi Airport Sân bay Đồng Hới Cảng hàng không Đồng Hới
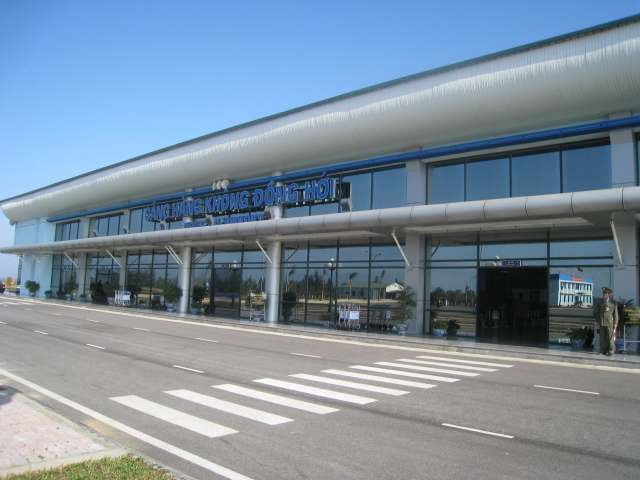
- IATA: VDH; ICAO: VVDH

Summary
- Airport type: Public
- Owner/Operator: Airports Corporation of Vietnam
- Location: Đồng Thuận Ward, Quảng Trị Province
- Time zone: UTC+7 ({{{utc}}})
- Elevation AMSL: 18 m (59 ft)
- Coordinates: 17°30′54″N 106°35′26″E
- Website: www.vietnamairport.vn/donghoiairport

Map
- Location of airport in Vietnam

Runways
Direction	Length		Surface
Direction	m	ft	Surface
11/29	2,400	7,874	Concrete

Statistics (2019)
- Aircraft movements: not available
- Total passengers: 539,908(▲ N/A%)

Dong Hoi Airport and the nearest two airports (Vinh about 195 km (121 mi) to the north, and Hue–Phu Bai), about 172 km (107 mi) to the south away by road

Dong Hoi Airport (IATA: VDH, ICAO: VVDH) is an airport located in Đồng Thuận Ward, 6 km (3.7 mi) north of Đồng Hới Ward, capital of Quảng Trị Province, in North Central Coast of Vietnam, about 500 km (310 mi) southeast of Hanoi by road. The facilities cover 173 ha, on a sandy area, by the coast of South China Sea. The runway approaches near the seashore and nearly parallel to the Highway 1. The airport, like all civil airports in Vietnam, is owned and operated by Airports Corporation of Vietnam.

The airstrip was built unpaved by French colonists in the 1930s to serve the First Indochina War and was later upgraded by North Vietnam as an airbase for the Vietnam War. On 30 August 2004, the reconstruction of the airport began and was scheduled to be completed in 2006 but not until May 2008 was it inaugurated. On May 18, 2008, the airport was officially put into operation with the first commercial flight from Hanoi's Noi Bai International Airport.

As of March 2015, this is one of 4 commercial airports in North Central Coast, the others are Phu Bai International Airport in Huế, Vinh Airport in Nghệ An Province, and Tho Xuan Airport in Thanh Hóa Province.

The airport handled 500,000 passengers in 2017, to its full designed capacity. The airport is estimated to handle 700,000 passengers in 2018.

An expansion project is planned to start in the Q4 2018, with the extension of the runway to 3600 m (category runway 4E) along with one parallel taxiway, capable of serving large aircraft like Airbus A350, Boeing 787, with two separate international and domestic terminals, with a combined designed capacity of 10 million passengers per annum.

== History ==
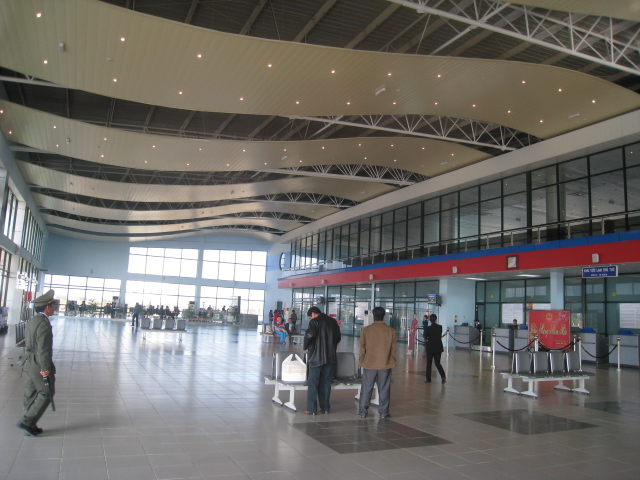
Inside the terminal of Dong Hoi Airport

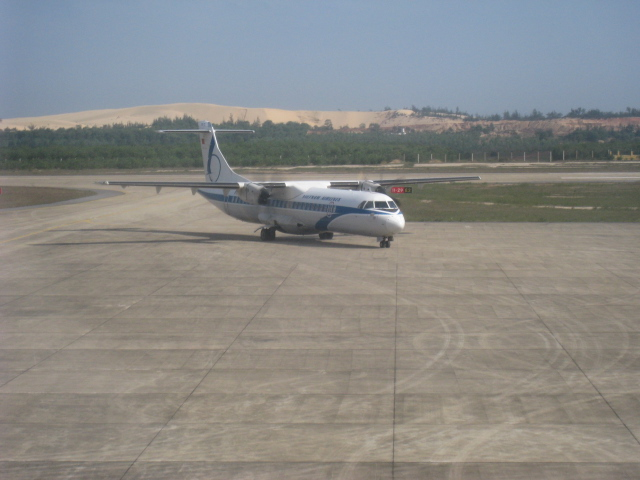
An ATR-72 of VASCO is approaching Dong Hoi Airport

The site of the airport was formerly an unpaved airstrip built by the French colonists and used from 1930 to 1954 to launch air raids against Viet Minh forces in the Central of Vietnam and Laotian communist forces Pathet Lao in the Central and Southern Laos during the First Indochina War.

In Vietnam War, the government of the Democratic Republic of Vietnam consolidated the runway surface of the airfield. This airstrip was used by North Vietnam as a transit point for air transport of personnel or cargo to the battlefields in the South Vietnam, especially those along the Ho Chi Minh trail.

However, during Vietnam War, this airstrip was not the base for North Vietnamese air attack on the United States battleships on South China Sea in an air raid known as Battle of Đồng Hới. The North Vietnamese fighters took off from Khe Gát Airfield near Phong Nha–Kẻ Bàng National Park instead.

This airstrip was the site Ho Chi Minh landed for his North Vietnamese southernmost visit ever to Quảng Bình during Vietnam War, he landed here at 8:30 am June 16, 1957 and took off back to Hanoi at 5 pm June 17, 1957. It was also the site then North Vietnamese prime minister Pham Van Dong and Cuban president Fidel Castro landed for a visit to the then newly occupied zone by North Vietnam of Quảng Trị in 1972. General Văn Tiến Dũng landed here before entering South Vietnam for direct command of communist forces in the last period of Vietnam War renowned as Ho Chi Minh Campaign in 1975.

After the fall of Saigon, this airfield was controlled by the Vietnam People's Army but used it for military and flood rescue activities on an irregular basis, and the airfield was actually almost abandoned.

In 2003, Phong Nha–Kẻ Bàng National Park was listed in UNESCO's World Heritage Sites list. The park contains systems of grottoes and caves, of which Vietnamese and British scientists have so far surveyed 20 with a total length of 70 km. Besides caves and grottoes, Phong Nha has the longest underground rivers, the largest caverns and passageways, the widest and prettiest sand banks, and the most astonishing rock formations in the world. Moreover, Phong Nha–Kẻ Bàng is rich in biodiversity. At the final conference of the National Council for Cultural Heritage held in Vietnam in 2007, scientists attending the meeting highly praised the scientific documentation of Phong Nha-Ke Bang park. Accordingly, the park is second to no other national parks listed in UNESCO's world heritage sites as far as biodiversity is concerned. Since Phong Nha–Kẻ Bàng National Park was listed in UNESCO's World Heritage Sites, the number of tourists to this park increased significantly, which required air links between this province with other major cities of Vietnam, namely Hanoi and Ho Chi Minh City.

The construction of Dong Hoi Airport was started on August 30, 2004, and was scheduled to be completed by the last quarter of 2007. The estimated cost to build the airport is $15 million, which was invested by the Northern Aviation Authority of Vietnam, an entity under the Civil Aviation Administration of Vietnam. The construction schedule of the airport was behind the schedule due to lack of capital from the government. It was scheduled to be completed in February 2008, but there were some pending items (10% of the total work), the deadline was extended. According to the next revised schedule, this airport would be completed and opened in 3rd quarter of 2008. Construction of the facilities achieved completion in May 2008. The Prime Minister of Vietnam signed a decision dated May 15, 2008 to put this airport into operation on May 18, 2008. The first commercial flight originated from Hanoi's Noi Bai International Airport landed at this airport on May 18, 2008, the official inaugural date of the airport. In April 2018, a Vietnamese private conglomerate, FLC Group (the owner of the Bamboo Airways) submitted to the Vietnamese authorities its proposal to expand this airport. The Ministry of Transport of Vietnam has approved this proposal to expand this airport in Q4 of 2018 and to launch more international flight routes. The expansion is scheduled to start in Q4/2018 with the expansion of the runway to 3600 m, construction of a new terminal with designed capacity of 10 million passengers per annum and other auxiliary facilities.

After the completion of the expansion project in 2020, this airport will have one 4E category runway (3600 m x 45 m) along with one parallel taxiway, capable of serving large aircraft like A350, B787, with two separate international and domestic terminals, designed capacity of 10 million passengers per annum.

== Facilities ==
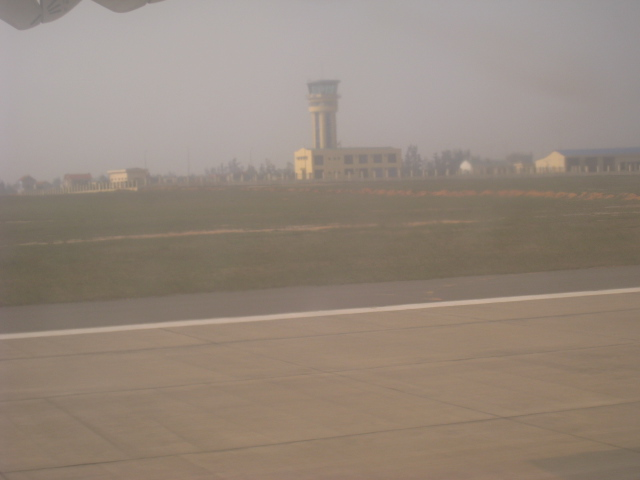
The Air Traffic Control Tower at Dong Hoi Airport

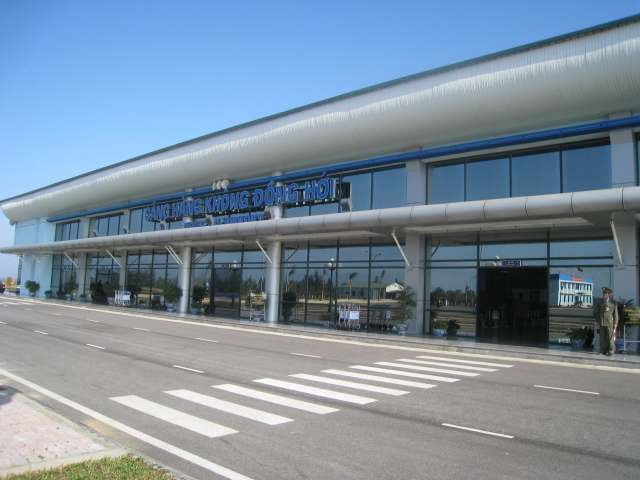
The terminal of Dong Hoi Airport

Dong Hoi Airport covers 173 ha, has one concrete paved runway (2,400 m x 45 m), ranked 4D according to ICAO, a two-story 4282-square-meter terminal, 15,000-square-meter apron for 2 Airbus A320 and Airbus A321s or equivalent, an air traffic control tower and six check-in counters and security equipment. The airport is capable of handling medium range aircraft like Airbus A320, A321 or equivalent. Expansion plan has been approved by the government of Vietnam to make this airport capable to serve jumbo jets like Boeing 767.

This airport has a designed capability of 300 passengers/peak hour or 500,000 passengers per annum. An instrument landing system was equipped in 2013. The apron was scheduled to be expanded in 2014 to add 2 more parking spaces for medium range aircraft. The installation of runway lighting was completed on October 16, 2014, allowing the operation 24/24.

== Airlines and destinations ==
=== Current destinations ===
The airport serves Dong Hoi city. It will serve mainly tourists to beaches in Dong Hoi city and World Natural Heritage of Phong Nha–Kẻ Bàng National Park, the starting point of The Middle World Heritage Road. As of July 2020, Vietnam Airlines, VietJet Air, Pacific Airlines are providing non-stop flights linking this airport with Noi Bai International Airport (Hanoi) and Tan Son Nhat International Airport (Ho Chi Minh City),

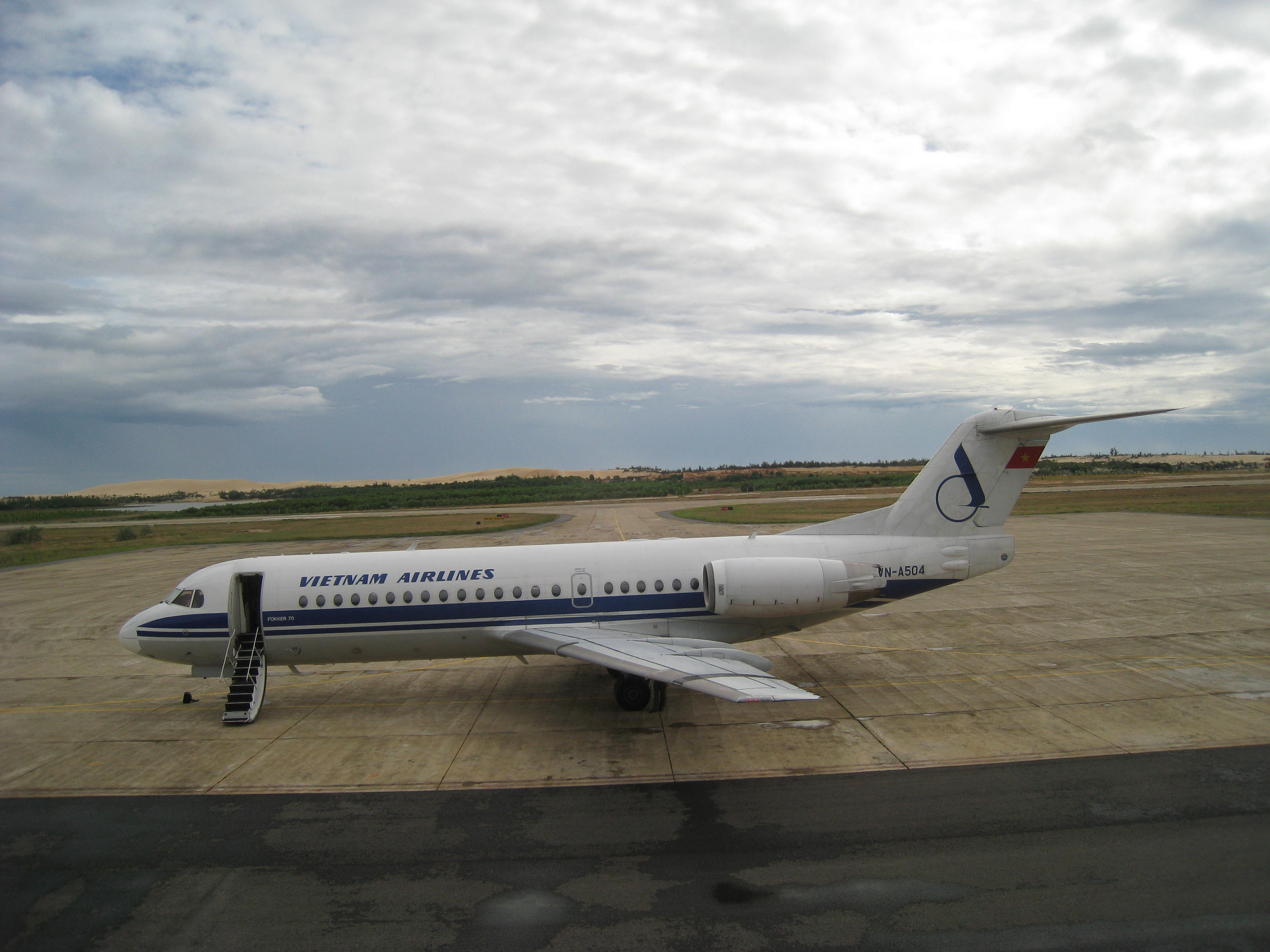
A Fokker 70 previously operated by VASCO at Dong Hoi Airport

The first international flight from this airport to Chiang Mai was launched by Jetstar Pacific (now Pacific Airlines) on August 11, 2017, with two flights per week

Airlines	Destinations
Hai Au Aviation	Charter: Da Nang
Sun PhuQuoc Airways	Hanoi,Nha Trang
VietJet Air	Ho Chi Minh City; Charter: Taipei–Taoyuan
Vietnam Airlines	Hanoi, Ho Chi Minh City

=== International destinations ===
There are currently no direct international routes from Dong Hoi Airport. If passengers would fly internationally from this airport, they would need to transit in either Hanoi or Ho Chi Minh City to get to other international destinations.

=== Statistics ===
Statistics in 2009-2011

- 2008: 104 aircraft movements, 2351 passengers
- 2009: 470 aircraft movements, 22,564 passengers
- 2010: 984 aircraft movements, 49,803 passengers
- 2011: 956 aircraft movements, 68,427 passengers
- 2012: 1104 aircraft movements, 90,000 passengers
- 2013: 105,586 passengers
- 2014: 114,000 passengers
- 2015: 261,372 passengers, an increase of 122,1% compared to that of 2014.
- 2016: 365,820 passenger (an increase of 39.96% vs 2015).
- 2017: 500,000 (an increase 36,67% compared to that of 2016)

== See also ==
- List of airports in Vietnam
