= Bang Spa =

Hot mineral springs in Vietnam

- Bang Hot Springs
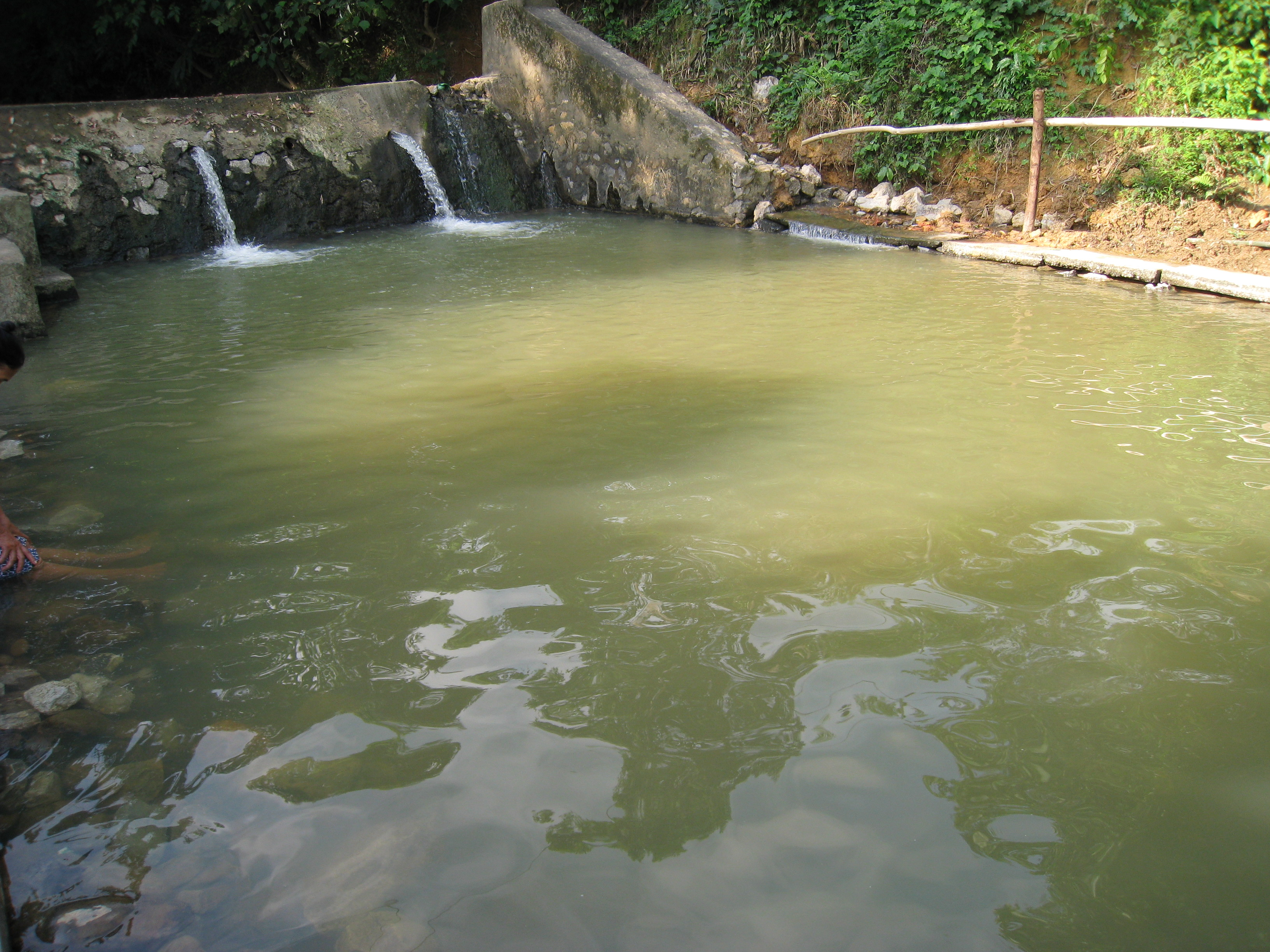
- A soaking pool in Bang Spa Service Park
- Interactive map of Bang Spa
- Location: Quảng Bình Province, Vietnam
- Coordinates: 17.067905°N 106.83894°E
- Type: geothermal
- Temperature: 105 °C (221 °F)

Bang Spa is an area of hot mineral springs in Bang hot spring in Kim Thuy Commune, Le Thuy District, Quảng Bình Province, Vietnam. The surface mineral water here is hot enough to boil eggs. This is a tourist attraction of the province as many see bathing in hot mineral water as a health treatment.

== Water profile ==
The hot springs emerge from the source at temperature of about 105°C. There are two hot streams and one cold stream 300m from the source at a temperature range of 40-45°C, for bathing. The underground geothermal reservoir reaches temperatures as high as 200°C. The mineral water is rich in calcium and other minerals and is now bottled for use by the Bang Mineral Water Company.

== Area ==
The Annamite Range runs across the western end of this province and features many limestone caves and small gorges along the rivers here. The province is also home to some other tourist attractions, such as Phong Nha-Kẻ Bàng National Park (a World Heritage Site listed by UNESCO) and the Đá Nhảy and Nhật Lệ beaches. The area around Bang Spa is being studied for potential geothermal energy uses.

== Gallery ==
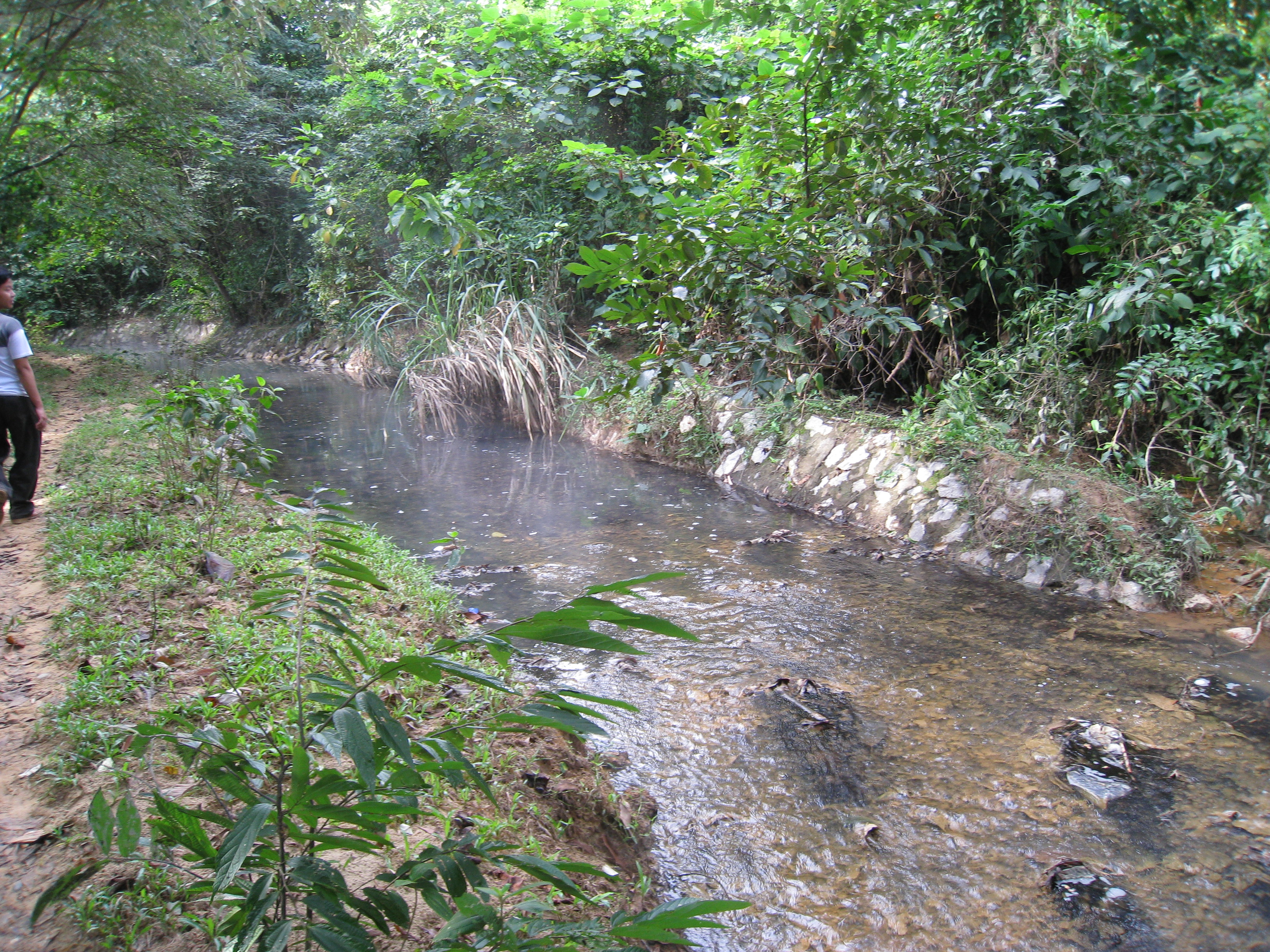

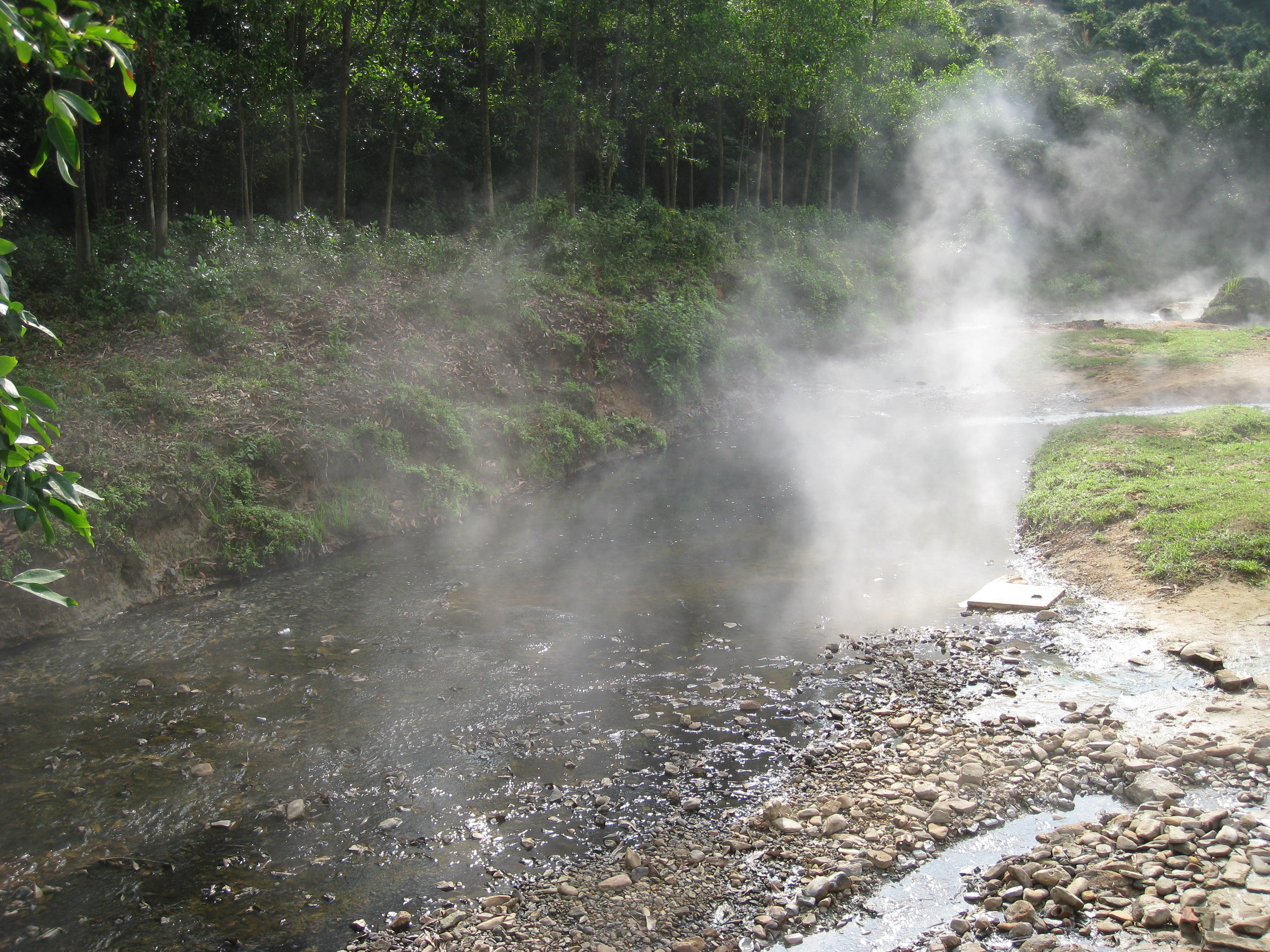

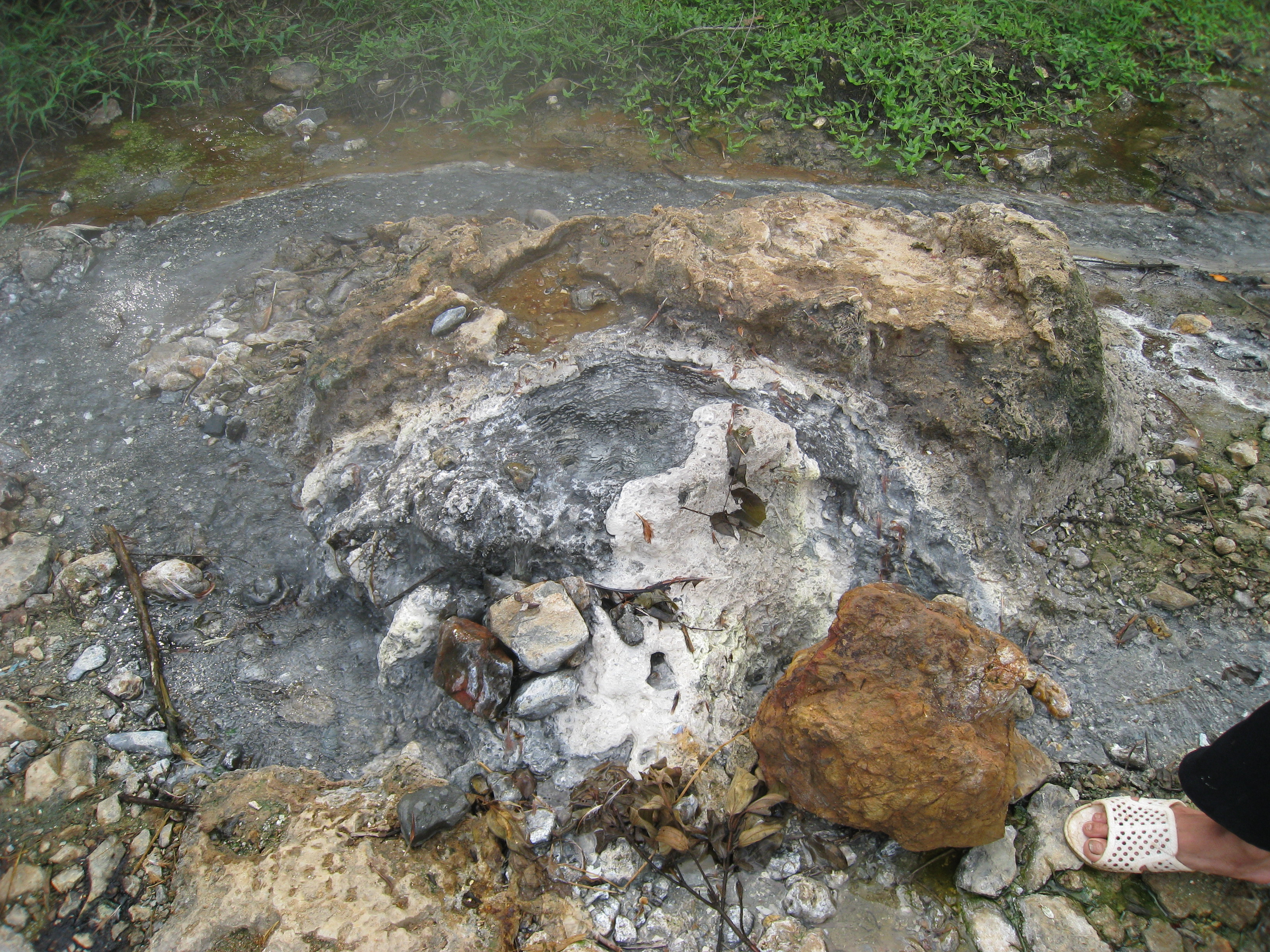

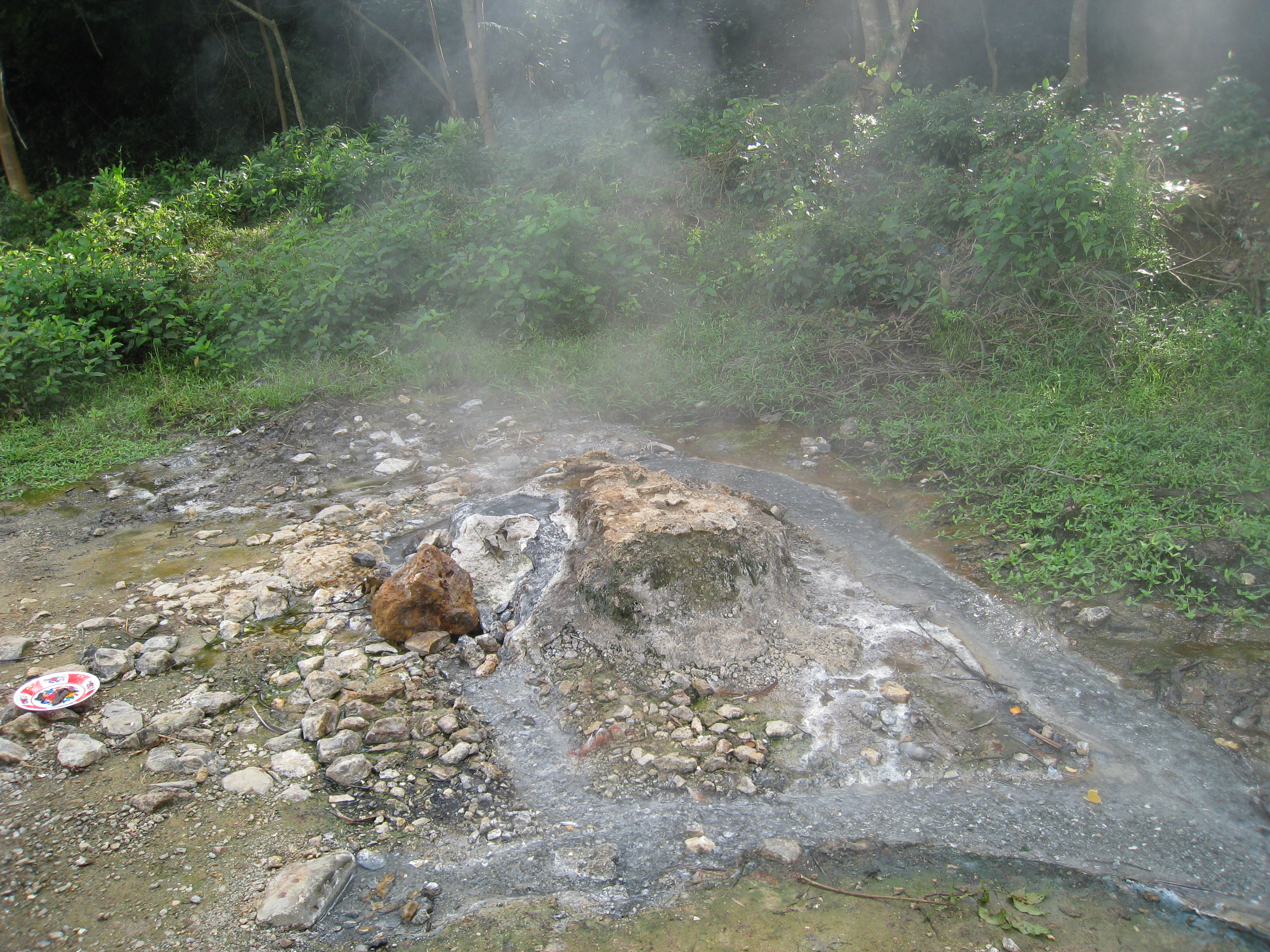

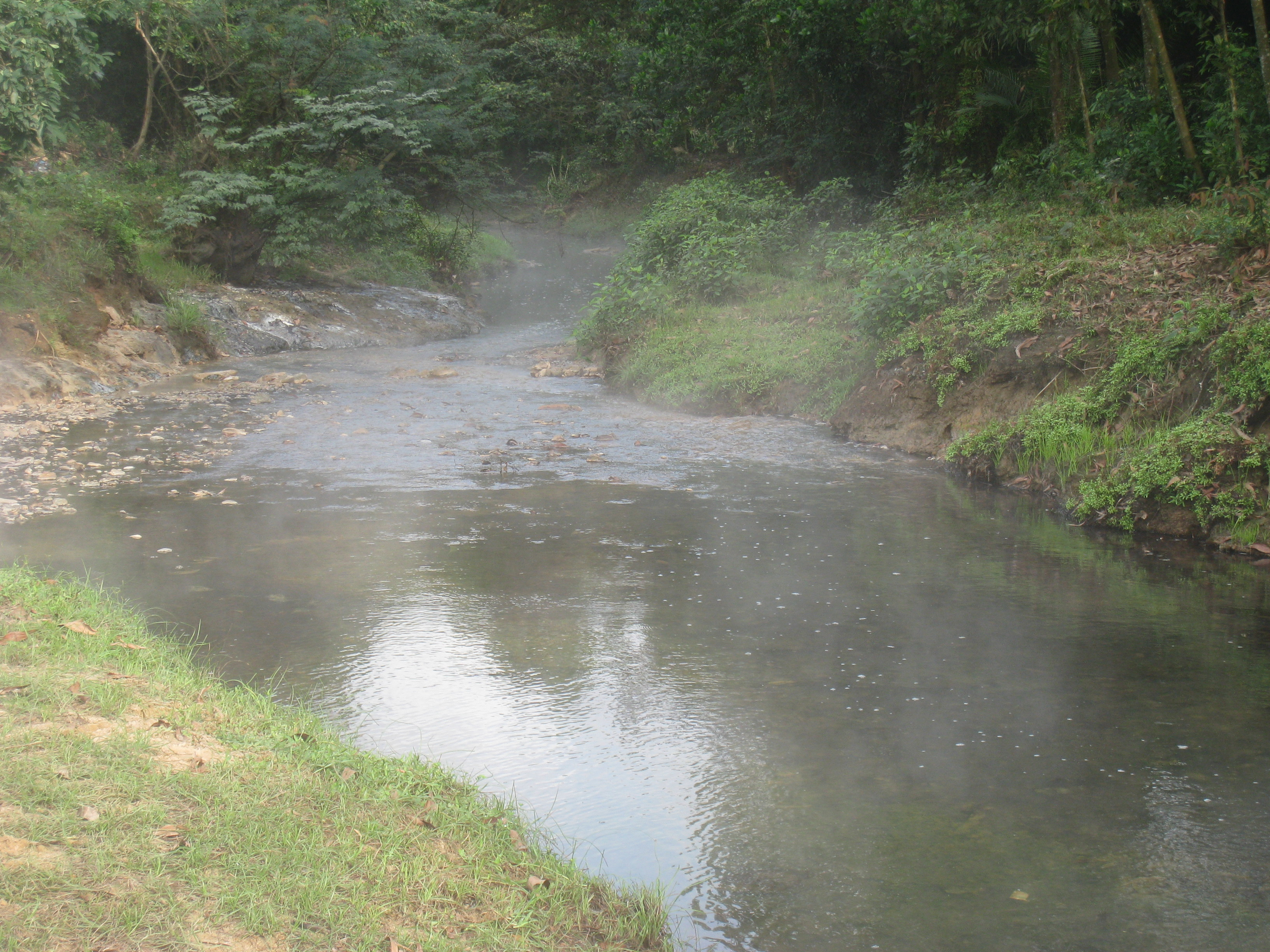

== Sources ==
- Bang Hot Spring in official of Vietnam Administration of Tourism
