= Quảng Bình University =

Coordinates: 17.4858°N 106.6045°E

- Đại học Quảng Bình
- Type: Public
- Chancellor: Dr. Hoang Duong Hung
- Location: 312 Lý Thường Kiệt street, Bắc Lý, Đồng Hới, Quảng Bình Province, Vietnam
- Language: Vietnamese
- Website: qbu.edu.vn

Quảng Bình University is a university established in 2006 after merging colleges with the Normal College in Đồng Hới city, the capital of Quảng Bình Province.

The university accepts entry exam candidate registers as of 2007. It provides education at university level of teacher's training (normal) (including maths, physics, chemistry, biology, literature, history, geology), law, business administration and English language.
