= Võ Nguyên Giáp Gifted High School =

Võ Nguyên Giáp Specialized High School
- Trường THPT Chuyên Võ Nguyên Giáp
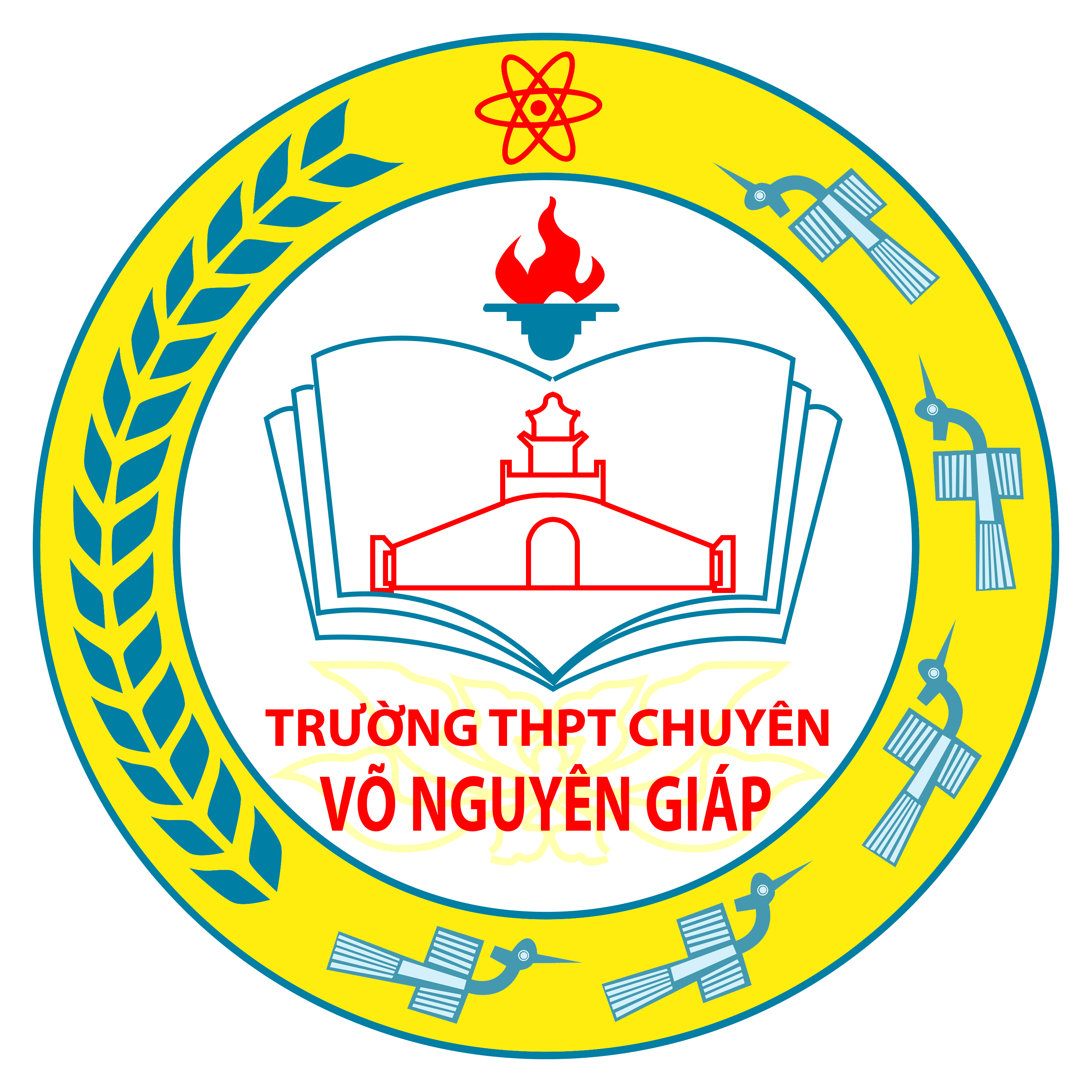
- Logo of Võ Nguyên Giáp Specialized High School

Location
- Sector 10, Nam Ly District; Đồng Hới, Quảng Bình; Vietnam

Information
- Type: Public, Magnet school
- Established: July 1996
- Principal: Hoàng Thanh Cảnh
- Faculty: 102
- Grades: 10-12
- Enrollment: approx. 1000

Võ Nguyên Giáp Specialized High School (up to 2014 Quảng Bình Specialized High School) is an entry selective school for high-performing children, located in Đồng Hới city in Quảng Bình province, Vietnam. The school offers a basic and advanced curriculum for students, many of whom have won several national and international prizes such as the International Mathematics Olympiad, Vietnamese Mathematics Olympiad, Asian Physics Olympiad, and many other fields.

== History ==
Võ Nguyên Giáp Gifted High School was established in 1991 as Đào Duy Từ High School. In 1996, it was separated and named Quảng Bình Gifted High School with the aim of fostering and training students in the natural sciences, social sciences, and humanities.

In May 2014, the school was renamed to Võ Nguyên Giáp Gifted High School, named after General Võ Nguyên Giáp, whose hometown was in Quảng Bình province.

== Education ==
Like many other Vietnamese high schools, Võ Nguyên Giáp High School for the Gifted includes students in grades 10, 11, and 12. The school aims to develop students' talents in one or two subjects as well as to ensure their comprehensive development. There are ten distinct classes per grade. Nine of those classes are ones in which students can specialize in a specific subject: Math, Chemistry, Physics, Information Technology, Biology, English, History, Geography, and Literature. All students are supposed to perform at a satisfactory level with an average mark above 7.0 in order to stay enrolled at the school. Students in the specialized classes study the advanced curriculum of their subject, and are encouraged to take part in national as well as international competitions.

== Admission ==
There is an annual entrance examination for 9th graders in July. Students are required to take tests in four subjects: Math, Literature, English, and the subject that they wish to specialize in. Many students prepare for many months prior to the exam since the acceptance rate is quite low. Each of the gifted classes accepts 35 students at best.

== Achievements ==
Over its 20 years of establishment, Võ Nguyên Giáp Gifted High School and its students have won a variety of awards and prizes.

- International Prize for the Gifted
- Asian Physics Olympiad
- Asian and Pacific Sea Competition for Gifted Students
- National Gifted Examination
- Provincial Tests for Specialized Students
- Two-time winner of the National Quality Award for Gifted High Schools:
  - 1st time in 2008
  - 2nd time in 2015
- Labour Medal for Dedication in Education in 2008 and 2015
- Governmental Honor Flag in 2015

== School facilities ==
The campus covers an area of around 24,000 square meters on Nguyen Van Linh street.

=== Academic facilities ===
There are 36 standardized classrooms, a language room, two science laboratories, four computer rooms, and a library with nearly 20,000 books.

=== Athletic facilities ===
Sporting facilities include a multifunctional room, which serves as an assembly hall and a sports stadium; basketball courts; and a football and track field, where students play soccer and participate in physical education classes.

=== Accommodation ===
The dormitory is a three-leveled building located next to the multifunctional room. There are 20 rooms, each of which can accommodate up to six students. There is a canteen on the first floor.

== Student life ==
Students can take part in various extracurricular activities, voluntary work or charity activities with the school.
