= Đông Hà =

- Ward
- People's Committee of Đông Hà Ward
- Interactive map of Đông Hà
- Coordinates: 16.832536067308222°N 107.08985636500645°E
- Country: Vietnam
- Region: North Central Coast
- Province: Quảng Trị
- Established: 16 June 2025
- Administrative headquarters: Huyền Trân Công Chúa Street

Area
  - Total: 38.04 km^{2} (14.69 sq mi)

Population (2025)
  - Total: 50,915
  - Density: 1,338/km^{2} (3,470/sq mi)
- Website: dongha.quangtri.gov.vn

Đông Hà is a ward in Quảng Trị province, Vietnam.

== History ==
On 16 June 2025, the Standing Committee of the National Assembly of Vietnam issued Resolution No. 1680/NQ-UBTVQH15 on the arrangement of commune-level administrative units in Quảng Trị province in 2025. Under the resolution, the entire area and population of Wards 1, 3 and 4, Đông Giang Ward, and Đông Thanh Ward, all formerly part of Đông Hà city, were merged to form a new ward named Đông Hà.
