= Bàu Tró =

Lake in Quảng Bình Province, Vietnam

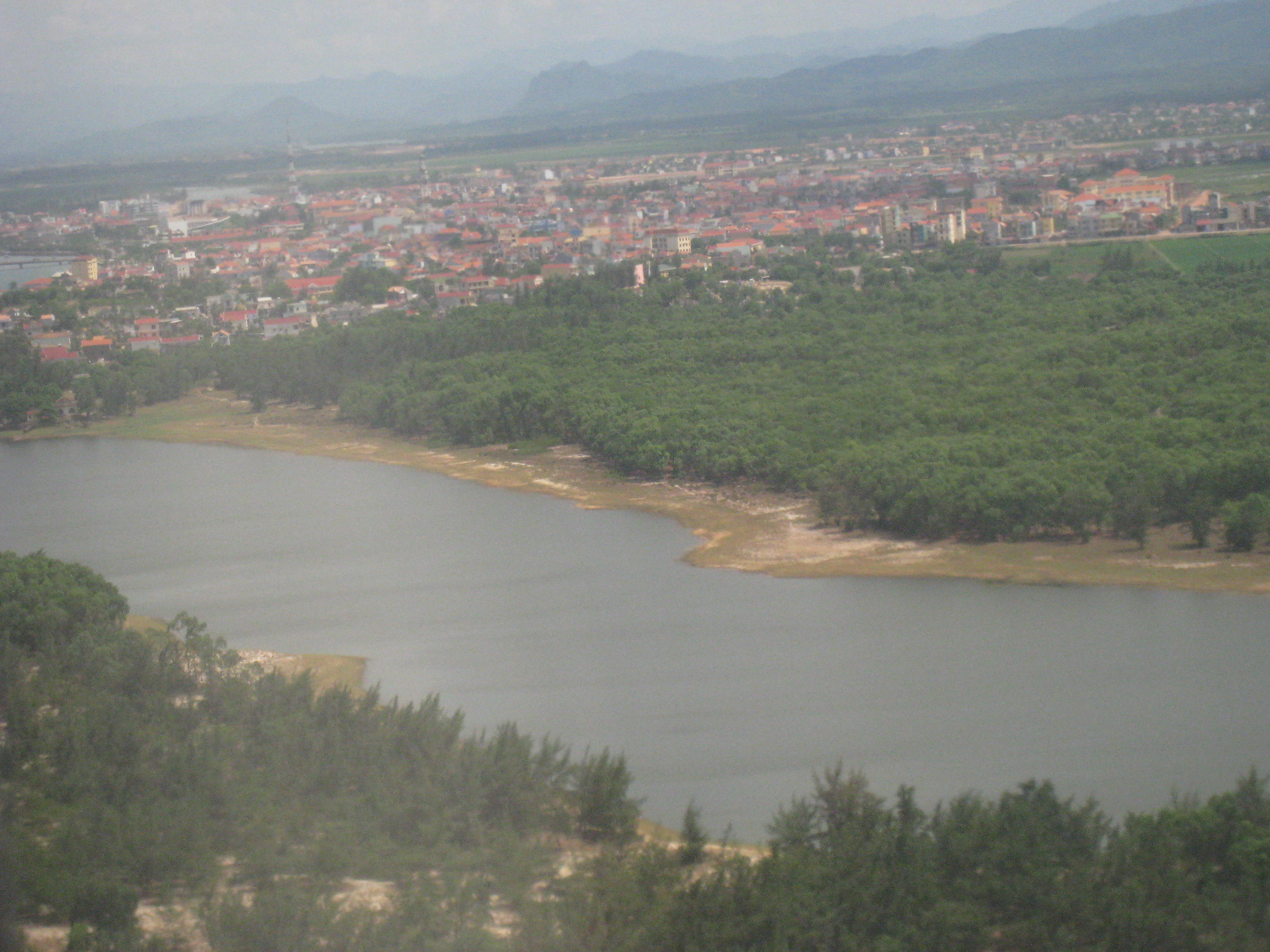
- Aerial view of Bàu Tró (Đồng Hới City is in the background)

- Location within Vietnam
- Location: Đồng Hới, Quảng Bình Province
- Coordinates: 17.491389°N 106.622778°E
- Basin countries: Vietnam

Bàu Tró (Bàu in Vietnamese dialect means pond) is a lake in Đồng Hới city, Quảng Bình Province, Vietnam. This lake is an important fresh water supply for more than 130,000 inhabitants of Đồng Hới. Bàu Tró is better known for archaeological findings by French archaeologists during French Indochina periods. The artefacts found here dated back as far as 5,000 years ago, displaying important proof of human settlements in this area.
