= Khe Gát Airfield =

Former military airfield in Quang Binh, Vietnam

- Sân bay Khe Gát
- Part of Vietnam People's Air Force

Site information
- Type: Airfield
- Controlled by: Vietnam People's Air Force
- Condition: abandoned

Location
- Coordinates: 17°39′35″N 106°13′04″E

Site history
- Built: 1969
- In use: 1969-72
- Battles/wars: Vietnam War; Battle of Dong Hoi

Khe Gát Airfield (Vietnamese: Sân bay Khe Gát, also known as Khe Phat Airfield) was a military airfield in Bo Trach District, Quang Binh, Vietnam. It was built within seven months in 1969 and played a major role for the Vietnam People's Air Force during the Battle of Dong Hoi in April 1972. Nowadays it is part of the Ho Chi Minh Highway.

== History ==
On 19 April 1972, two MiG-17s piloted by Lê Xuân Dị and Nguyễn Văn Bảy "B" took off from the airfield. At approximately 17:00, one of the MiG-17s scored a direct hit on USS Higbee with a BETAB-250 (250 kg; 550 lb) bomb, after failing to hit its target twice on two previous attack runs. The attack crippled Higbee's 5-inch gun turret, impaired its steering and propulsion, and wounded 4 sailors on deck. Another MiG-17 simultaneously aimed its bombs at USS Oklahoma City but missed the target.

The U.S. later responded by bombardment against Vinh and Dong Hoi on the same day and the following, and an air strike by 33 aircraft on April 22 at the airfield. The U.S claimed destroying one MiG and damaging another on the ground. According to the North Vietnamese, one MiG-17 was damaged.
