= Nhật Lệ River =

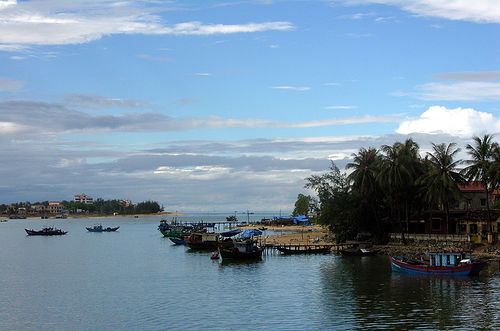
- Nhật Lệ River in Đồng Hới, Quảng Bình, Viet Nam

Location
- Country: Vietnam

Physical characteristics
- Length: 85 km (53 mi)

The Nhật Lệ River is a river in Đồng Hới city, Quảng Bình Province, Vietnam. The Nhật Lệ River is 152 km long, of which the Kiến Giang River is 58 km in length, and the Long Đại River is 77 km long. The river is formed by the confluence of the Kiến Giang River in Lệ Thủy District and the Long Đại River in Quảng Ninh District. The Nhật Lệ River flows northeast (unlike most rivers in Vietnam, which run southeast) before emptying into the South China Sea. At the mouth of this river are several white fine sand beaches which are popular tourist attractions. In the history of Vietnam, this river was the site of several wars between the Kingdom of Champa with Đại Việt as well as internal Đại Việt factions, especially the Trịnh–Nguyễn War.

== See also ==
- Nhật Lệ Beach
