= Tam Tòa Church =

Ruined building in Đồng Hới, Vietnam

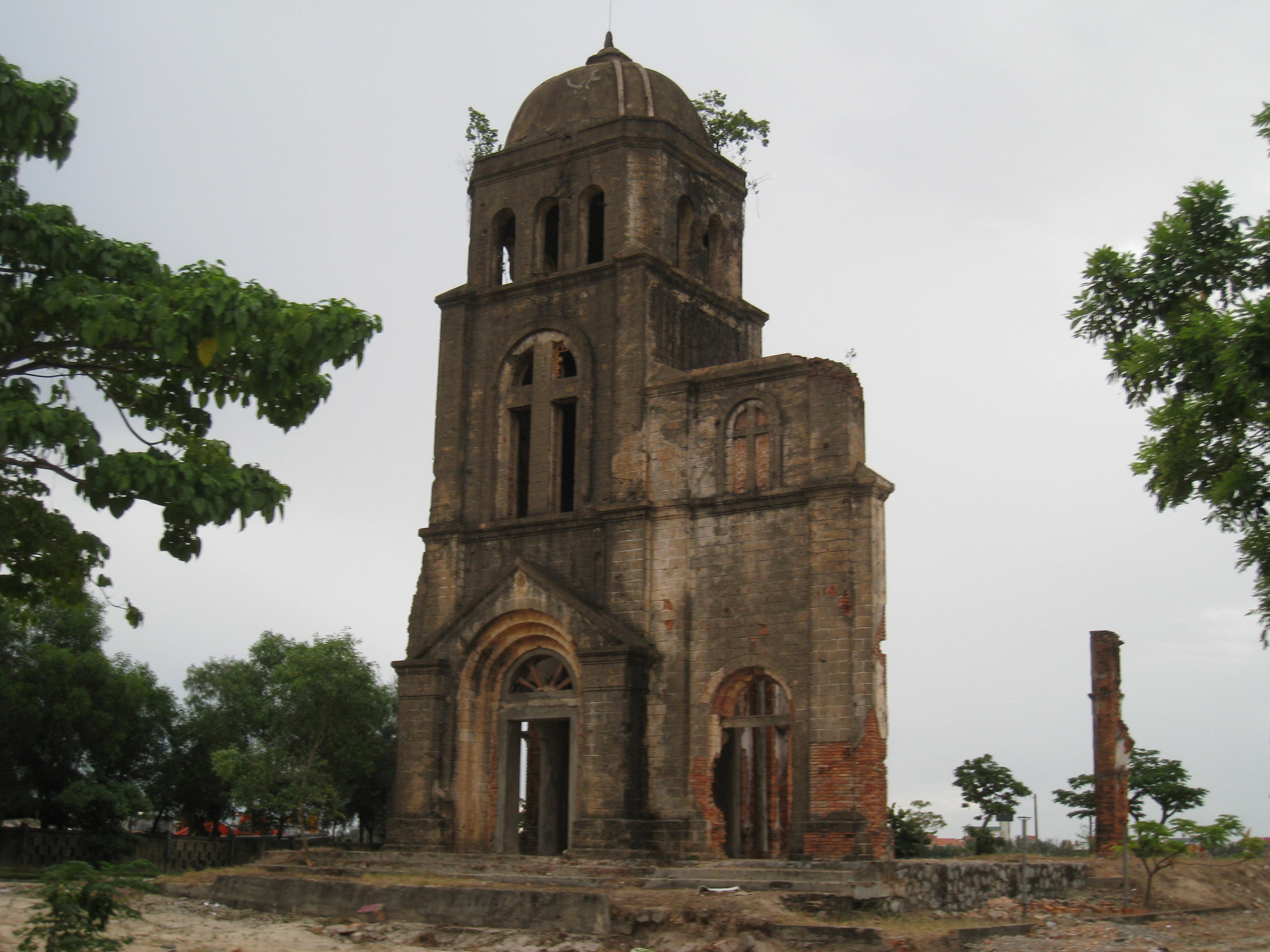
Ruins of Tam Tòa Church

Tam Tòa Church (Vietnamese: Nhà thờ Tam Tòa) is a ruined Catholic church in Đồng Hới, central Vietnam. Built in the late 19th century, the church was destroyed by American bombing on February 11, 1965, during the Vietnam War. It has remained undisturbed a

== History ==
Tam Tòa parish is one of the oldest Catholic parishes in Vietnam with its roots dating back to the mid 17th century.

There have been ongoing disputes between the government and the rebuilding of the church. The Diocese of Vinh and the Archdiocese of Huế have been trying to reclaim the church (what is left of it and its ground) since 1996 when it was taken back by the local government in an attempt to turn it into a war symbol of American aggression. Up until 1996, mass was celebrated weekly in front of the church's tower.

In February 2009 after years of fruitless negotiation, 14 parish priests and Bishop Cao of Vinh Diocese decided to concelebrate mass on the property without obtaining permission.

In July 2009 a rumor was spreading that the local government would build a tourist resort next to the church. Parishioners in response started building an altar and erecting a cross on the property. On July 21, the government sent in police to disperse the crowd gathering to continue its construction and protest. A dozen people were arrested and some were beaten by the police. The situation was made worse when the police attacked two priests from other parishes who went to Vinh Diocese to show support. The two are in critical condition.

Some of the Vietnamese Catholics in Vietnam (about seven million, or 7% of the population) responded by holding vigil masses and silent protests all weekend long in central Vietnam. This is a direct challenge to the government.

Even though the situation was viewed as conflict between the Catholic Church and the Vietnamese government by the rest of the country, the issue of confiscated land and the rights of land ownership have been a flashing point between government and the general public for years. Whether the Tam Tòa crisis will lead to changes in the government or force the government to take actions against those who challenge its authority remains to be seen.
