= Kiến Giang River =

River in Vietnam

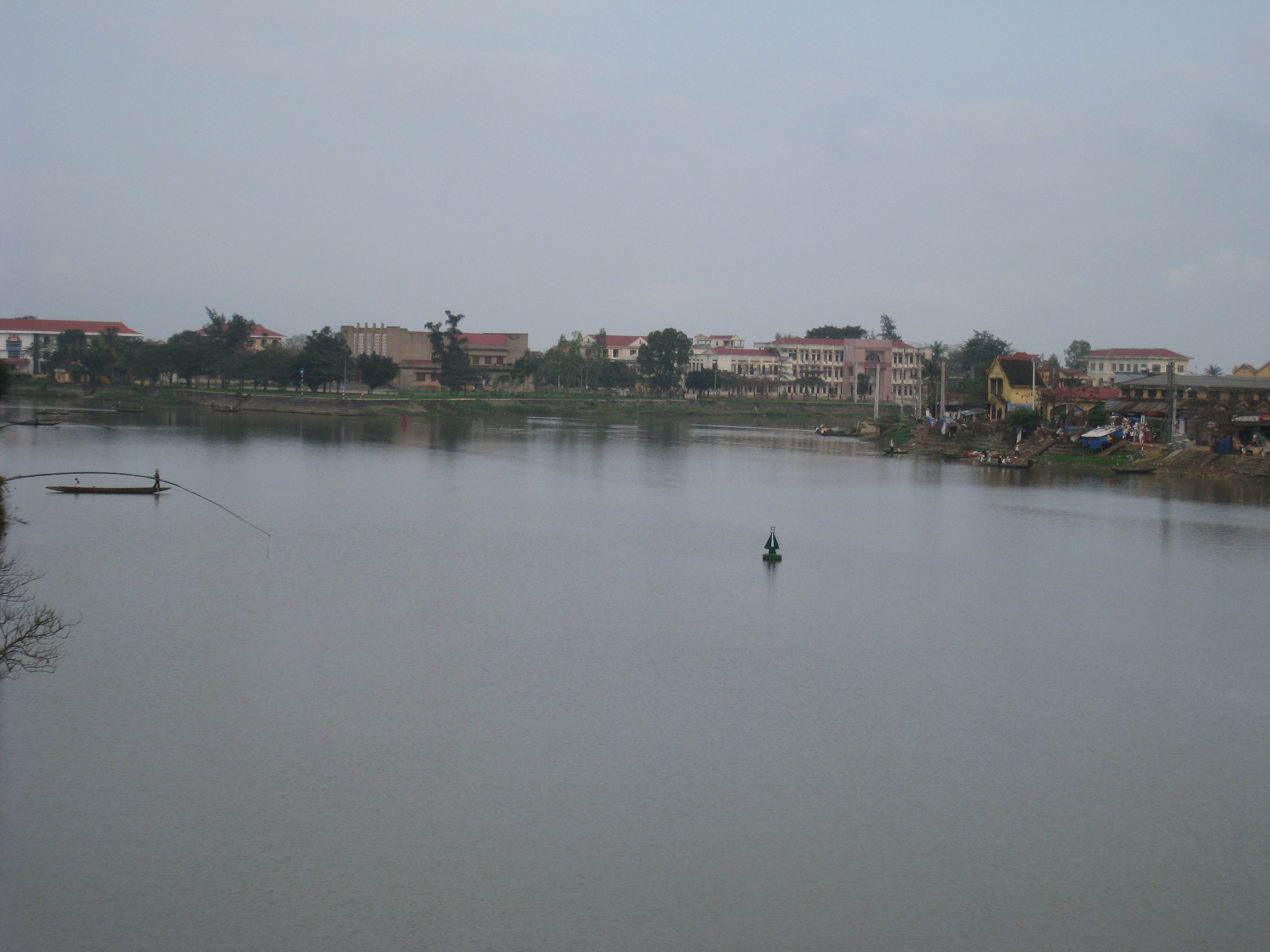
Kiến Giang River in Kiến Giang Town

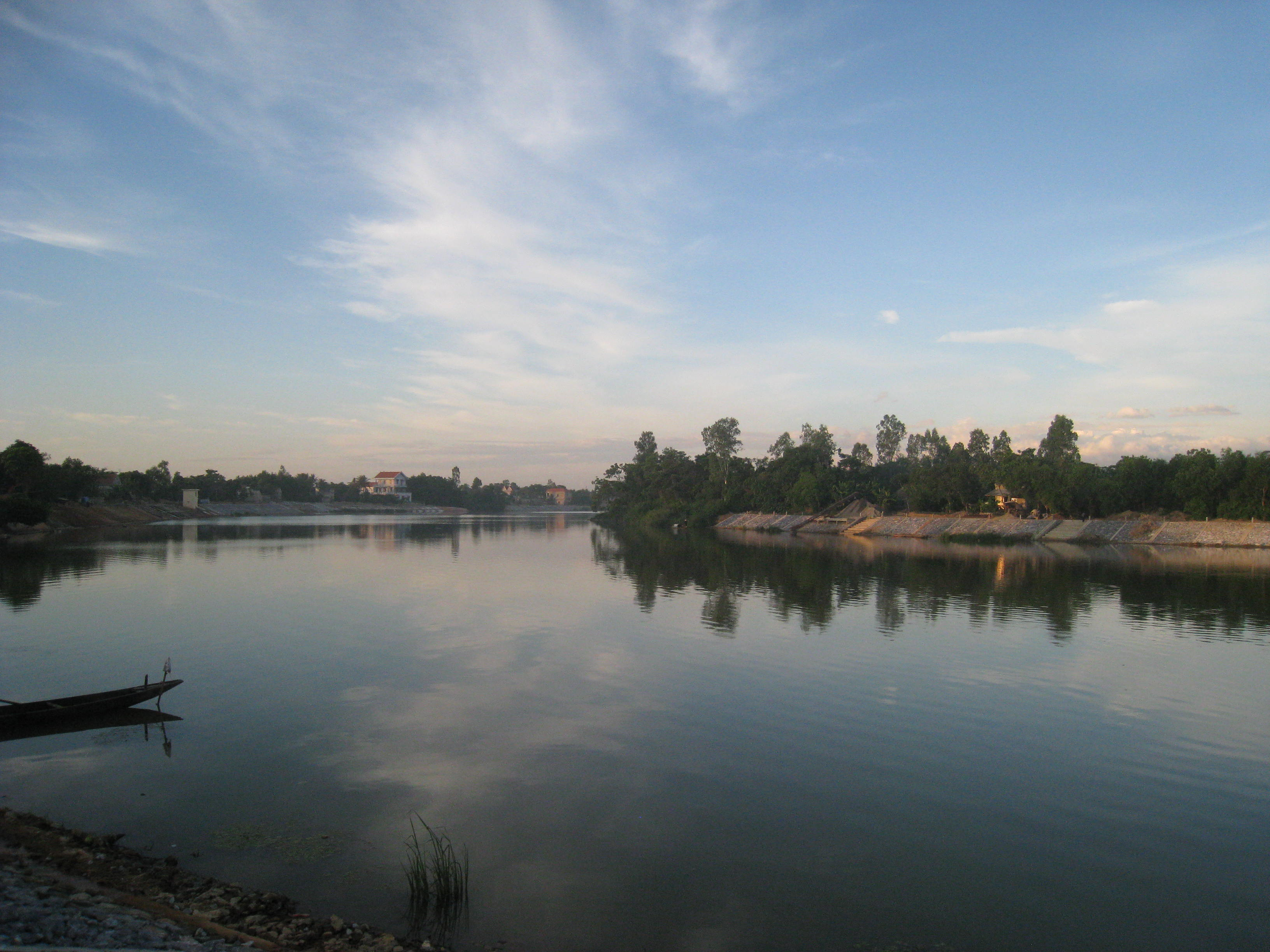
Kiến Giang River in Lệ Thủy District

The Kiến Giang River (Vietnamese: Sông Kiến Giang) is a river in Lệ Thủy District, Quảng Bình Province, North Central Coast, Vietnam. The length of the river is 58 km. It is a tributary of the Nhật Lệ River. The Kiến Giang River originates in the Annamite Range (Truong Son Range) where various streams add water to it. The upper part of this river is sloping, therefore rain water from Annamite Range flows violently to the lower part in rainy seasons (in autumn), causing floods in it basin. Thanks to An Ma Dam, this situation has been stopped. Unlike other rivers in Vietnam which flow southeast, the Kiến Giang River flows northeast, and creates a narrow delta in Lệ Thủy District. Like all of the rivers in Central Vietnam, this river water is clear, which means that it carries little alluvium. The Kiên Giang River meets the Long Đại River in Quảng Ninh District, Quảng Bình Province, and together they create the Nhật Lệ River.

On the banks of the Kiên Giang River, some famous Vietnamese politicians were born and grown up, such as Võ Nguyên Giáp, Ngo Dinh Diem, and Nguyễn Hữu Cảnh.

== External links and references ==
- Rivers in Quảng Bình Province Official Website of Quảng Bình government
