= Nam Trạch =

Coordinates: 19°03′N 105°33′E

- Commune and village
- Interactive map of Nam Trạch
- Country: Vietnam
- Province: Quảng Trị

Area
  - Total: 0.94 sq mi (2.44 km^{2})

Population (2006)
  - Total: 9,028
- Time zone: UTC+07:00

Nam Trạch is a commune (xã) and village in Quảng Trị Province, in the North Central Coast region of Vietnam.

On June 16, 2025, the Standing Committee of the National Assembly issued Resolution No. 1680/NQ-UBTVQH15 on the reorganization of commune-level administrative units in Quảng Trị Province in 2025. Accordingly, Việt Trung Plantation Township, Nhân Trạch Commune, and Lý Nam Commune were merged to form a new commune named Nam Trạch Commune.
