= Nhật Lệ Beach =

Beach in Vietnam

Coordinates: 17°28′01″N 106°34′59″E

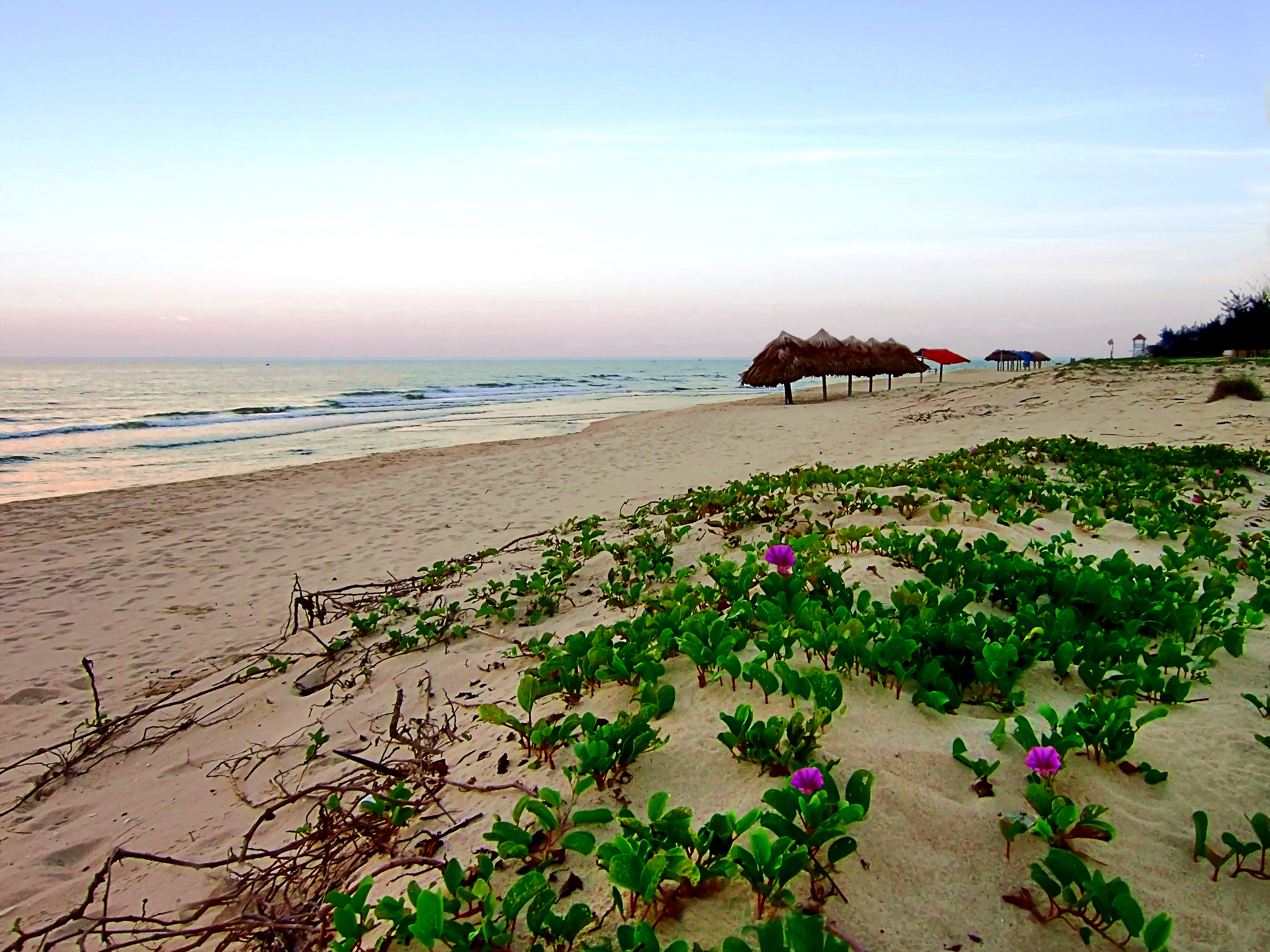
Nhật Lệ Beach

== Location ==
Nhật Lệ Beach is a beach in Đồng Hới city, the capital of Quảng Bình Province, home to World Heritage Site Phong Nha-Kẻ Bàng National Park. The beach is located on the mouth of the Nhật Lệ River emptying into the South China Sea.

== About ==
Nhat Le Beach has white sand and clear blue sea. Nhat Le Beach is also famous for a great deal of beautiful cultural activities and historical sight-seeings. It has inspired for composers, authors to make many songs, poems, pictures and so forth in a long time. The beach is good for families with kids, Seniors, Couples, Solos, Groups. It is completely free to visit the beach.
