= USS Lloyd Thomas (DD-764) =

Gearing-class destroyer

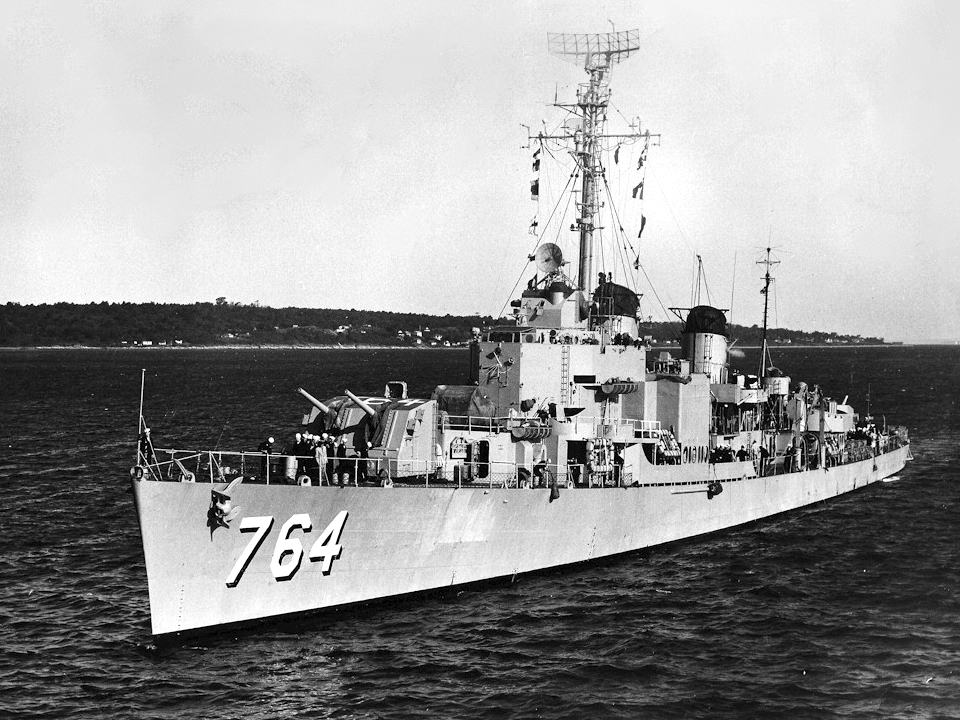
- USS Lloyd Thomas at Newport in 1951

History

United States
- Name: Lloyd Thomas
- Namesake: Lloyd Thomas
- Builder: Bethlehem Shipbuilding Corporation
- Laid down: 26 March 1944
- Launched: 5 October 1945
- Sponsored by: Mrs. Lloyd Thomas
- Commissioned: 21 March 1947
- Modernized: December 1961 (FRAM II)
- Decommissioned: 12 October 1972
- Reclassified: DDE-764, 4 March 1950; DD-764, 30 June 1962
- Stricken: 12 October 1972
- Identification: Callsign: NTKT; Hull number: DD-764
- Fate: Sold to the Republic of China, 12 October 1972

History

Taiwan
- Name: Dang Yang; (當陽)
- Namesake: Dang Yang
- Acquired: 12 October 1972
- Commissioned: 12 December 1972
- Reclassified: DDG-911, 1980s
- Decommissioned: 16 March 1999
- Stricken: 16 March 1999
- Identification: Hull number: DD-911
- Fate: Sunk as artificial reef, 31 October 2002

General characteristics
- Class & type: Gearing-class destroyer
- Displacement: 2,425 long tons (2,464 t)
- Length: 390 ft 9 in (119.10 m)
- Beam: 41 ft (12 m)
- Draft: 18 ft 6 in (5.64 m)
- Speed: 35 knots (65 km/h; 40 mph)
- Complement: 336 officers and enlisted
- Armament: 6 × 5 in (127 mm)/38 caliber guns; 12 × 40 mm (1.6 in) Bofors AA guns; 11 × 20 mm (0.79 in) Oerlikon AA cannons; 10 × 21 in (533 mm) torpedo tubes; 6 × depth charge projectors; 2 × depth charge tracks

The third USS Lloyd Thomas (DD/DDE-764) was a Gearing-class destroyer in the United States Navy during the Korean War and the Vietnam War.

== Namesake ==
Lloyd Thomas was born on 10 March 1912 in Nelsonville, Ohio. He was the second son and the fifth of six children of Perry Rice Thomas, a miner, and Donna Maria Fisher Thomas. He attended the local schools, graduating from Chauncey Dover High School and earning a degree from Ohio University in Athens, Ohio in June 1935. Thomas was appointed as an aviation cadet on 4 October 1938, and commissioned as an ensign on 26 October 1939. He joined Torpedo Squadron 6 (VT-6) aboard aircraft carrier USS Enterprise on 13 December 1939 and a year later was promoted to lieutenant, junior grade. He married Mildred Macklin, a Navy nurse, in Yuma, Arizona, taking out a marriage license on 1 March 1941.

Piloting a Douglas TBD Devastator torpedo bomber on 4 June 1942, he died in his squadron's attack during the Battle of Midway. He was posthumously awarded the Navy Cross.

The name Lloyd Thomas was assigned first to the destroyer escort USS Lloyd Thomas (DE-312) and then to the destroyer escort USS Lloyd Thomas (DE-374), but both were canceled in 1944 before their construction was complete.

== Construction and commissioning ==
Lloyd Thomas was laid down by Bethlehem Steel Corporation, Shipbuilding Division, San Francisco, California, 26 March 1944; launched 5 October 1945; sponsored by Mrs. Lloyd Thomas, widow of Lt(jg.) Thomas; and commissioned 21 March 1947.

=== Service in the United States Navy ===
After shakedown off San Diego, California and a training cruise in Hawaiian waters, the new destroyer departed the west coast 16 January 1948 for a round-the-world training and good will voyage. In company with the aircraft carrier USS Valley Forge and three other destroyers, Lloyd Thomas visited Sydney, Australia, Hong Kong, and Tsingtao, China. After Tsingtao, Lloyd Thomas, USS William C. Lawe, and Valley Forge proceeded westward, touching Singapore, Ceylon, and Saudi Arabia, transited the Suez Canal and the Straits of Gibraltar, then steamed north for calls at Bergen, Norway, and Southampton, England. The formation left England 13 March 1948, spent five days in New York City, and arrived at home port San Diego, Calif. 11 June, having steamed 46,168 nautical miles (85,503 km) during the five-month voyage.

During the rest of 1948, the destroyer trained reserves. In 1949, after conversion to a hunter-killer type destroyer at San Francisco Navy Yard, the ship joined the Atlantic Fleet at Newport, Rhode Island, in October and steamed north with the 2nd Task Fleet for cold weather exercises in the Arctic.

Returning home from the Arctic, the destroyer operated between Bermuda and Puerto Rico during the first two months of 1950. She was redesignated DDE-764 on 4 March 1950. Following four months of antisubmarine exercises and a midshipmen cruise early in July, the ship departed Newport 15 July for a five-day call at Reykjavík, Iceland. Returning from Iceland in early August, she left Newport for Naval Station Norfolk, Va. 6 September in company with three other destroyers. Just off Norfolk the destroyers rendezvoused with USS Coral Sea and escorted the big carrier to the Mediterranean. After rigorous operations with the 6th Fleet and calls at Sardinia, Sicily, and Golfe-Juan, France, Lloyd Thomas and her sister destroyers departed Gibraltar on 1 November to escort USS Midway home. They arrived Norfolk on 9 November and the destroyers made Newport the next day.

==== Operation Mainbrace ====
During the next two years, the ship conducted antisubmarine operations in the Caribbean and made yearly voyages to the Mediterranean. The 1952 voyage included a NATO amphibious landing on the coast of Denmark (Operation "Mainbrace") and port calls in Scotland in England. During 1953 she again operated with NATO, this time in the Mediterranean, and visited Cannes and Naples.

In early 1954, Lloyd Thomas checked out the new canted-deck carrier Antietam (CVS-36) in the intricacies of anti-submarine warfare. From August to January 1955 the destroyer again operated with NATO units in the Mediterranean. Except for a quick run to Lisbon, Lloyd Thomas spent the rest of 1955 operating in home waters. The highpoint of 1956 was a summer midshipman cruise to Spain and the British Isles in company with the battleship USS Wisconsin.

On 4 January 1957 the ship departed Newport with Destroyer Division 242 and submarine USS Batfish for South America to acquaint personnel in Colombia, Peru, Ecuador, and Chile with the techniques in antisubmarine warfare. Returning to Newport from Chile 18 March, she conducted local operations until departing 12 August for patrol duty in the Mediterranean and Red Seas.

She spent most of 1958 in the Caribbean, with Operation Springboard that spring and refresher training during September and October. In 1959, besides hunter-killer training off Norfolk and a summer midshipman cruise to Quebec, Lloyd Thomas again operated with NATO in European waters.

During 1960, the ship returned to the Mediterranean, spending June through September with the 6th Fleet. Between exercises she visited Palma de Majorca, Barcelona, and Naples.

From March to December 1961, Lloyd Thomas underwent a Fleet Rehabilitation and Modernization (FRAM) II conversion, a program designed to add years of service to destroyers built shortly after World War II. After leaving New York Naval Shipyard she commenced six weeks of refresher training at Guantanamo Bay, Cuba. Redesignated DD-764 on 30 June 1962, the destroyer operated along the east coast until departing 7 September 1962 for a six-month tour to the Mediterranean and Middle East. During her duty with the Middle East Force in January and February 1963, the ship visited Ceylon, crossed the equator, and called at the Indian Naval Base in Visakhapatnam. She arrived Newport early in March and resumed operations from her home port.

==== Operation Fairgame II ====
The ship returned to the Mediterranean in May 1964 for the joint Franco-American amphibious Operation Fairgame II. Then after a brief call at Athens, she spent June and July in the Near East, showing the flag and promoting good will in the nations bordering the Red Sea and Persian Gulf.

==== Operation Steel Pike I ====
From 10 October to 19 November 1964, Lloyd Thomas escorted 28,000 Marines from Little Creek, Va. to the coast of Spain during "Operation Steel Pike I", the largest peacetime amphibious operation ever conducted.

During 1965 the destroyer, after installing new electronic gear to update her antisubmarine capabilities, trained in Guantanamo Bay, then participated in the late summer antisubmarine operation, CANUS-SILEX, with the Royal Canadian Navy in the western Atlantic. On 15 February 1966 she deployed from Newport again to the Mediterranean.

Returning to Newport 8 July, the destroyer entered drydock for three weeks beginning 29 July, at Bethlehem Shipyard, Boston, Massachusetts. Resuming operations on 22 August, she was plane guard for USS Wasp during the recovery phase of the Gemini II operation, 4 through 18.November.

On 1 March 1967 Lloyd Thomas, with the rest of Destroyer Squadron 10 (Desron 10), departed Newport for another cruise to the Mediterranean during the Arab–Israeli war.

The ship arrived back at Newport on 20 July and operated out of her home port the remainder of the year. On 7 May 1968, after a brief tour of exercises in the Caribbean, DD-764 entered Boston for overhaul. Back in full fighting trim in the fall, she returned to local operations out of Newport into 1969.

==== Vietnam War ====
On 19 April 1972, in what would later be called the Battle of Đồng Hới, the Lloyd Thomas with three other US Navy warships were engaged in a naval strike just below the Vietnamese Demilitarized Zone against North Vietnamese coast artillery when attacked by artillery, MIGs and automatic weapons fire. Among other minor damage, the Lloyd Thomas was struck by a single artillery shell on the port bow above the waterline. Three sailors had minor injuries and the Lloyd Thomas remained on the firing line.

She was decommissioned on 12 October 1972 and struck from the Naval Vessel Register on the same day.

=== Service in the Republic of China Navy ===
She was sold to Taiwan on 12 October 1972, and renamed ROCS Dang Yang (DD-911).

In 1980s, she underwent Wu-Chin II modernization program and was reclassified as DDG-911.

She was decommissioned and stricken on 16 March 1999 and sunk as artificial reef on 31 October 2002.
