= Battle of Đồng Hới =

Part of the Vietnam War (1972)

Coordinates: 17°28′59″N 106°35′59″E

- Part of the Vietnam War
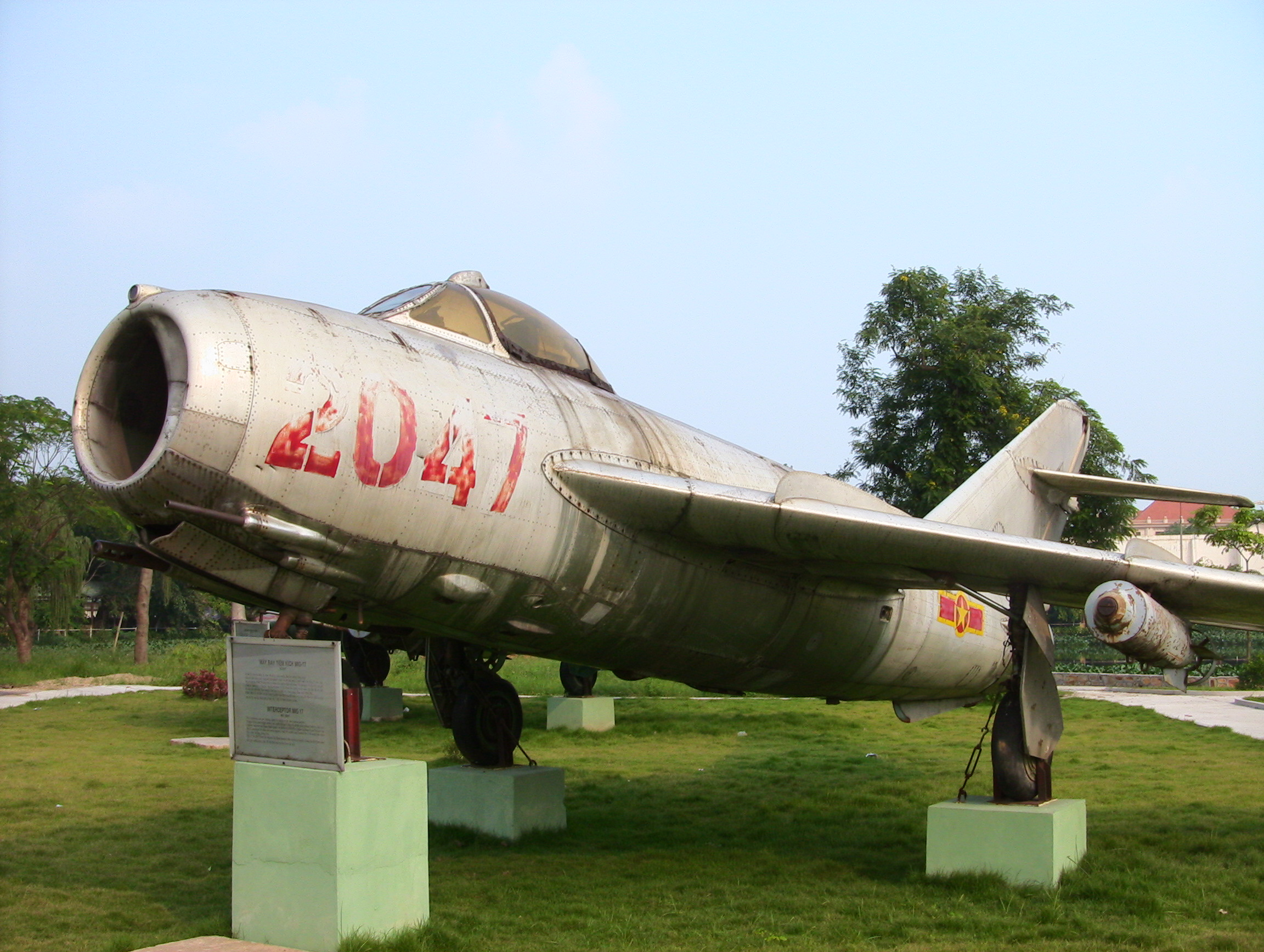
- MiG-17F (No. 2047) manned by pilot Nguyen Van Bay, which participated in the Battle of Đồng Hới
Date	19 April 1972; 54 years ago
Location	Offshore of Đồng Hới, Quảng Bình Province, North Vietnam
Result	North Vietnamese victory

Belligerents
North Vietnam	United States

Strength
Vietnamese figure: 2 MiG-17; U.S claimed: 2 torpedo boats 3 MiG-17	1 cruiser 2 destroyers 1 frigate

Casualties and losses
Vietnamese figure: none U.S claimed: 2 torpedo boats 1 MiG-17	4 wounded 1 destroyer damaged 1 cruiser damaged

The Battle of Đồng Hới was a clash between United States Navy (USN) warships and Vietnam People's Air Force (VPAF) MiG-17F fighter bombers and shore batteries on 19 April 1972, during the Vietnam War. This was the second time U.S. warships faced an air attack since the end of World War II, excluding the USS Liberty incident, which was officially recorded as an attack by mistake.

The Battle for Đồng Hới Gulf involved fierce firefights when Navy ships attempted to stop North Vietnamese troops and supplies transiting the coast highway in North Vietnam from reaching the battle front in Quảng Trị Province. The air raid described here marked the end of daylight raids by the Navy.

== Battle ==
The U.S. warships involved were the 7th Fleet flagship, guided missile cruiser USS Oklahoma City, the guided missile frigate USS Sterett, and destroyers USS Lloyd Thomas and USS Higbee.

The American warships operating in the Gulf of Tonkin were shelling North Vietnamese coastal targets around Đồng Hới, Quảng Bình Province, North Central Coast region near the DMZ along the 17th parallel, the provisional borderline between South Vietnam and North Vietnam when VPAF MiGs attacked them in the first air attack on U.S. naval forces in the Vietnam War.

At approximately 17:00, USS Sterett detected three hostile aircraft approaching the navy ships. One of the MiG-17s scored a direct hit on USS Higbee with a BETAB-250 (250 kg; 550 lb) bomb, after failing to hit its target twice on two previous attack runs. The explosion destroyed the aft 5-inch (127 mm) gun mount which was empty, as the 12-man crew had been evacuated following a "hang fire" (a round stuck in one of the barrels). Another MiG-17 simultaneously aimed its bombs at USS Oklahoma City but missed the target. The U.S. claimed that one of the MiGs was shot down by a Terrier surface-to-air missile from USS Sterett. One more MiG reportedly disappeared from Sterett's radar along with a Terrier missile fired at it from the frigate, indicating a probable kill. A North Vietnamese Styx anti-ship missile was alleged to have been fired and intercepted, but this was not confirmed by official documentation.

At approximately 18:00 as the U.S. ships withdrew to the northeast, USS Sterett detected two surface targets shadowing the U.S. ships; after 30 minutes, Sterett opened fire on the targets with its 5-inch (127 mm) gun and reported destroying the two suspected North Vietnamese P 6-class torpedo boats. However, the North Vietnamese claimed that their navy had not participated in any engagement until 27 August.

== Aftermath ==
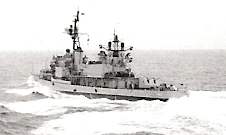
USS Higbee showing the aft 5"/38 gun mount bombed during the battle of Đồng Hới

The North Vietnamese claimed the sortie involved two MiG-17s piloted by Lê Xuân Dị and Nguyễn Văn Bảy, both of which returned safely to their base. The attack crippled Higbee's 5-inch (127 mm) gun turret, impaired its steering and propulsion, and wounded 4 sailors on deck. Oklahoma City only sustained minor damage on its stern. The U.S. later responded by bombardment against Vinh and Đồng Hới on April 19 and 20, and an air strike by 33 aircraft on 22 April at the Khe Gát Airfield, from which the attacking MiG-17s had taken off. The U.S claimed one destroyed MiG and another damaged on the ground. According to the North Vietnamese, one MiG-17 was damaged.

Although the losses inflicted were superficial, the North Vietnamese attack forced the Americans to employ more of their strength to prevent future incidents against the background of downscaling U.S. military activities in the area.
