= Đồng Thuận =

Coordinates: 17.5142°N 106.6056°E

- Ward and village
- Interactive map of Đồng Thuận
- Country: Vietnam
- Province: Quảng Trị
- Time zone: UTC+7 (UTC+7)

Đồng Thuận is a ward (phường) in Quảng Trị province, in Vietnam.

On June 16, 2025, the Standing Committee of the National Assembly issued Resolution No. 1680/NQ-UBTVQH15 on the reorganization of commune-level administrative units in Quảng Trị Province in 2025. Accordingly, the entire natural area and population of Bắc Lý Ward, Lộc Ninh Commune, and Quang Phú Commune were reorganized to form a new ward named Đồng Thuận Ward.
