= Đồng Sơn, Quảng Trị =

Coordinates: 17°25′24″N 106°33′00″E

Đồng Sơn
- Urban ward
- Interactive map of Đồng Sơn
- Country: Vietnam
- Province: Quảng Trị

Area
  - Total: 7.59 sq mi (19.65 km^{2})

Population
  - Total: 8,815
- Time zone: UTC+07:00 (Indochina Time)

Đồng Sơn is an urban ward (phường) in Quảng Trị Province, in Vietnam. It covers an area of 19.65 km^{2} and has a population of 8815.

On June 16, 2025, the Standing Committee of the National Assembly issued Resolution No. 1680/NQ-UBTVQH15 on the reorganization of commune-level administrative units in Quảng Trị Province in 2025. Accordingly, the entire natural area and population of Bắc Nghĩa Ward, Đồng Sơn Ward, Nghĩa Ninh Commune, and Thuận Đức Commune were reorganized to form a new ward named Đồng Sơn Ward.
