= Đồng Hới =

Coordinates: 17.4556°N 106.6119°E

- Urban ward
- Interactive map of Đồng Hới
- Country: Vietnam
- Province: Quảng Trị

Area
  - Total: 1.21 sq mi (3.13 km^{2})

Population
  - Total: 4,726
- Time zone: UTC+07:00 (Indochina Time)

Đồng Hới is an urban ward (phường) in Quảng Trị Province, in Vietnam. It is one of the 78 new wards, communes and special zones of the province following the reorganization in 2025.

On June 16, 2025, the Standing Committee of the National Assembly issued Resolution No. 1680/NQ-UBTVQH15 on the reorganization of commune-level administrative units in Quảng Trị Province in 2025. Accordingly, Đức Ninh Đông Ward, Đồng Hải Ward, Đồng Phú Ward, Phú Hải Ward, Hải Thành Ward, Nam Lý Ward, together with Bảo Ninh Commune and Đức Ninh Commune, were merged to form a new ward named Đồng Hới Ward.
