= La Gi (town) =

Coordinates: 10°39′36″N 107°46′19″E

La Gi Thị xã Lagi
- District-level town (Class-3)
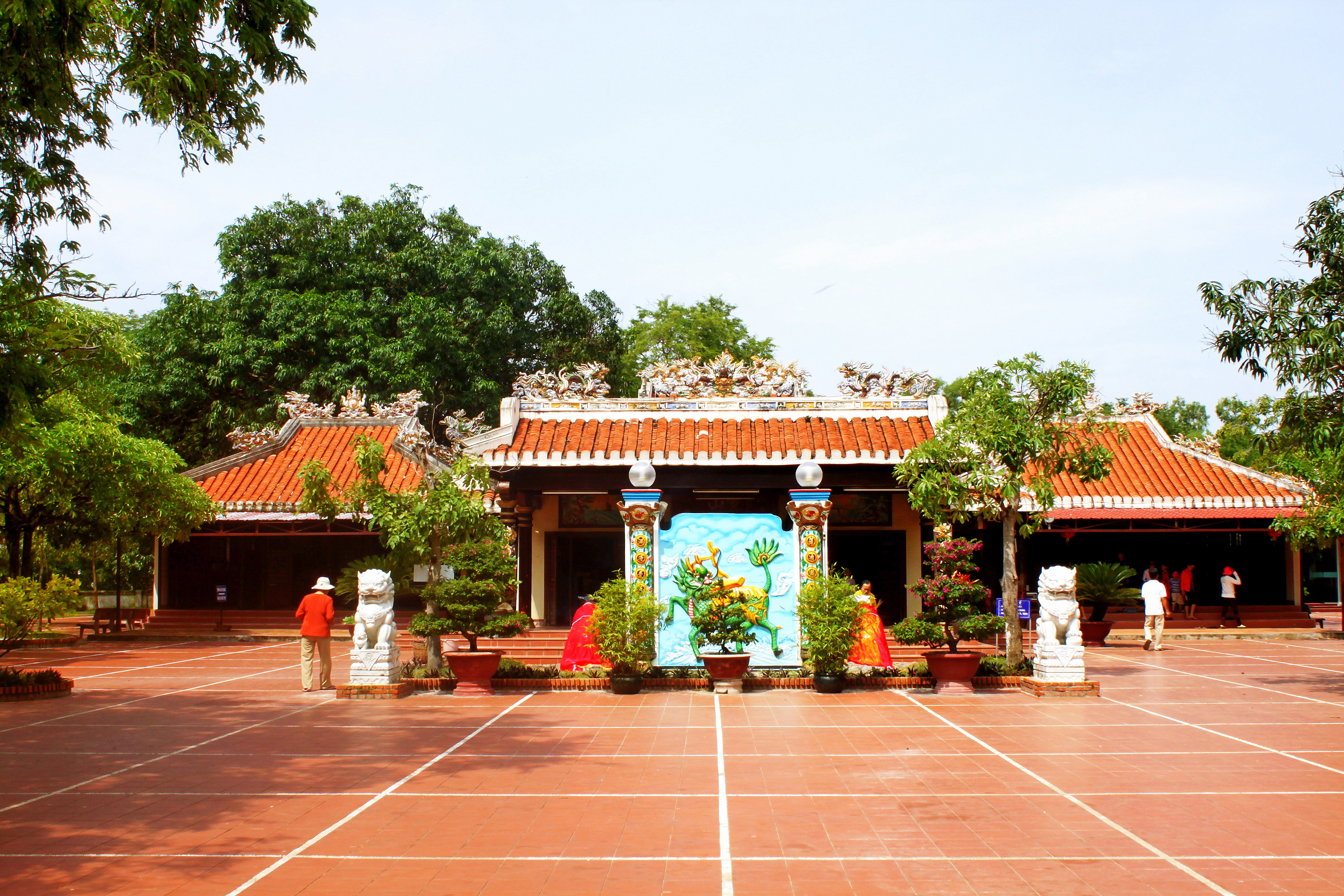
- Thầy Thím palace.

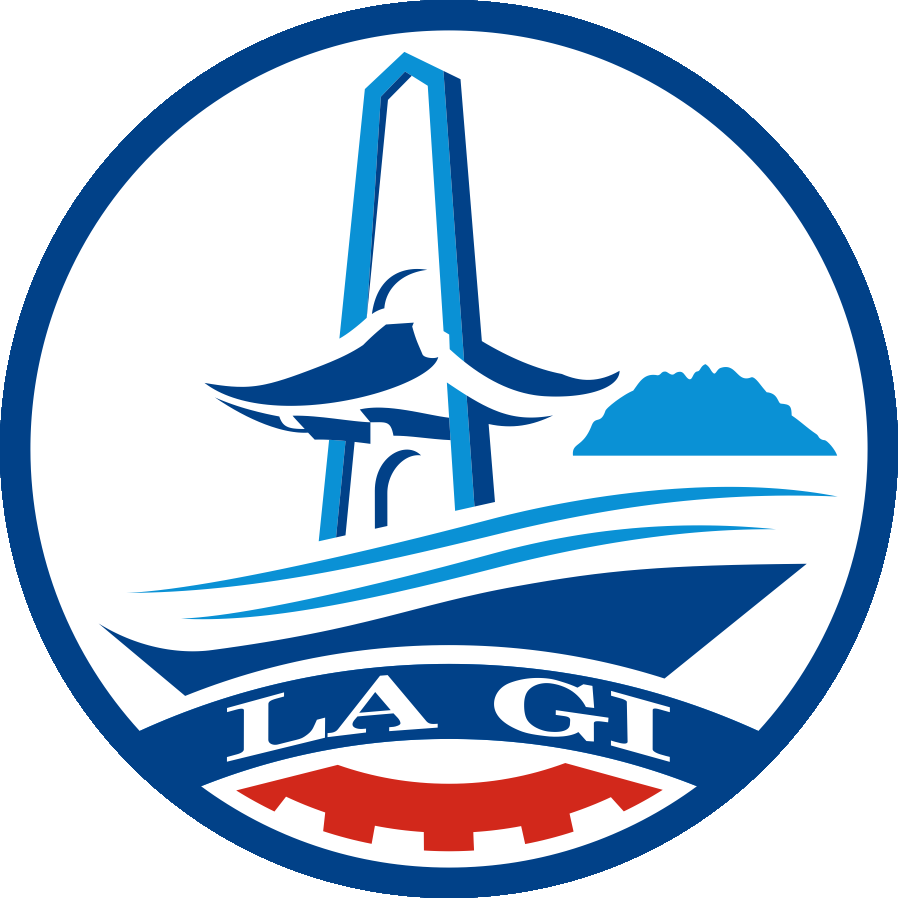
- Seal
- Interactive map of La Gi; Thị xã Lagi
- Location within Vietnam
- Country: Vietnam
- Region: South Central Coast
- Province: Bình Thuận
- Establishment: October 22, 1956
- Central hall: No.26, Hoàng Diệu road, Tân An ward, Lagi town

Government
  - Type: Town
  - People Committee's Chairman: Phạm Trọng Nhân
  - People Council's Chairman: Tôn Thất Muộn
  - Front Committee's Chairman: Võ Minh Vương
  - Party Committee's Secretary: Nguyễn Hồng Pháp

Area
  - Total: 185.37 km^{2} (71.57 sq mi)

Population (December 31, 2022)
  - Total: 108,519
  - Density: 585/km^{2} (1,520/sq mi)
  - Ethnicities: Kinh; Tanka; Champa
- Time zone: UTC+7 (Indochina Time)
- ZIP code: 800000–17000 (Note: An official code from May 1, 2024.)
- Website: Lagi.Binhthuan.gov.vn; Lagi.Binhthuan.dcs.vn

La Gi or Lagi is a former district-level town of Bình Thuận province in the South Central Coast region of Vietnam.

== History ==
Its name La Gi or Lagi [laː˧˧:ɣi˧˧] in Kinh language was originated from ladik [laː˧˧:ɗɨt˧˥] in Cham language, which means "swamp" to reflect the situation of this area before the 1960s.

Under the Republic of Vietnam regime, La Gi was the provincial capital of Bình Tuy province (present-day western Bình Thuận Province). After the Vietnam War, it became the capital of Hàm Tân District. It was established in 2005 with the split of La Gi away from Hàm Tân District.

== Geography ==
Currently, Lagi town is subdivided into :

- 5 wards : Tân An, Phước Hội, Phước Lộc, Tân Thiện and Bình Tân.
- 4 communes : Tân Phước, Tân Tiến, Tân Hải and Tân Bình.

Lagi borders with Hàm Tân District in the north and west, Hàm Thuận Nam District in the east and the East Sea in the south. It is also on the coastal road from Bình Châu via Lộc An beach to Phước Hải, Đất Đỏ. (Note: Vietnam Iain Stewart : "A beautiful road winds along the coast between Bình Châu and Long Hải, passing the upandcoming beaches of Hồ Cốc, Hồ Tràm and Lộc An, crossing through the towns of La Gi and Phước Hải, and eventually connecting Mũi Né".)
