= Bình Tuy province =

Historic province of South Vietnam

Bình Tuy was a province of South Vietnam. It now mostly corresponds to the western part of Bình Thuận, including Hàm Tân, Hàm Thuận Nam, Tánh Linh, Đức Linh districts and La Gi town.

Bình Tuy province was formed on 25 October 1956. In 1976, it was merged with Ninh Thuận and Bình Thuận to form Thuận Hải province. After the latter was divided again into Ninh Thuận and Bình Thuận in 1991, Bình Tuy remained part of Bình Thuận province.
