= Phước Hội (disambiguation) =

Phước Hội may refer to several places in Vietnam, including:

- Phước Hội, a ward of Lâm Đồng province
- Phước Hội, Bà Rịa–Vũng Tàu, a former commune of Đất Đỏ district
