= Phan Thiết (city) =

- Provincial city (Class-2)
- Phan Thiết City; Thành phố Phan Thiết
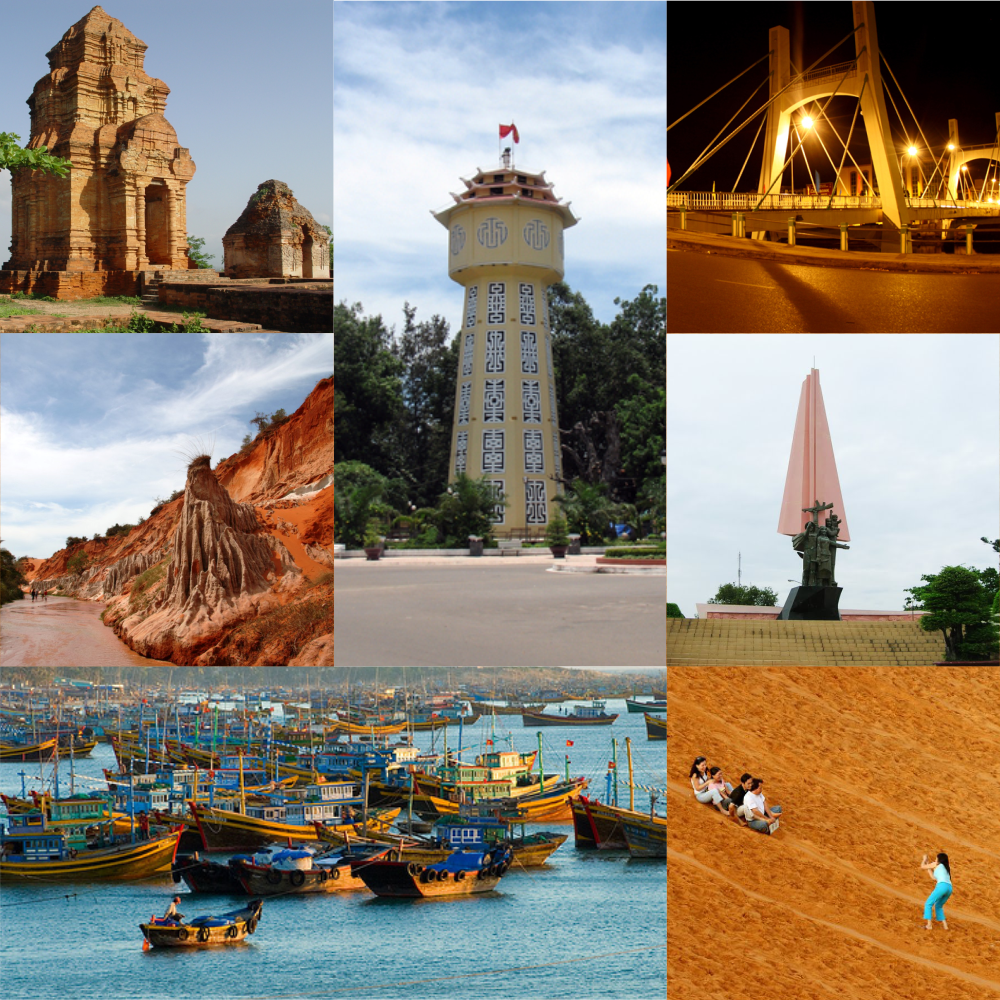
- "Phan Thiết Water Tower": symbol of Phan Thiết

- Seal
- Interactive map of Phan Thiết
- Location within Vietnam Location within Southeast Asia Location within Asia
- Coordinates: 10°56′N 108°06′E
- Country: Vietnam
- Province: Bình Thuận
- Founded: 1898, as Phan Thiết town, by Thành Thái
- Incorporated: 1933, as the Commune of Phan Thiết
- Consolidated: 1999, as the City of Phan Thiết
- Named for: Hamu Lithit (Cham language)

Area
  - Provincial city (Class-2): 210.9 km^{2} (81.4 sq mi)

Population (2020 census)
  - Provincial city (Class-2): 228.536
  - Density: 1.083/km^{2} (2.80/sq mi)
  - Urban: 195.760
- Time zone: UTC+07:00 (IST)
- ZIP codes: 80xxxx
- Area code: 62
- Climate: Aw

Phan Thiết (Vietnamese: [fān tʰiə̌t]) is the former capital of Bình Thuận Province on the southeast coast in Vietnam. While most of the inhabitants live in the city center, others reside in the four urban coastal wards, extending from Suối Nước beach in the northeast towards cape Kê Gà in the southwest.

Traditionally, fishing and the manufacturing of fish sauce served as the main source of Phan Thiết's local economy. The rise of tourism as the region's primary employer can be attributed to its beaches, and thus its growth is rapidly overshadowing its prevalent fishing industry.

== Name ==
There are several theories relating to the origin of the name Phan Thiết, most of which argue is not an authentic Vietnamese name:

- Before the Vietnamese conquest of the area in the 17th century, the Cham people called the land "Hamu Lithit" – with "Hamu", meaning 'hamlet in the field', and "Lithit", defined as 'near the sea'. Coinciding with the arrival of Vietnamese settlers, a new name in Vietnamese was gradually developed. Since the Vietnamese had already altered the Cham city of Panduranga into Phan Rang and another settlement into Phan Rí, they attached the prefix "Phan" into the shortening of "Lithit" to make the name Phan Thiết.
- Vietnamese people have been transliterating the Cham names into more 'traditional' Vietnamese sounding names: Pan(da)rang or Mang-lang into Phan Rang, Panrik or Mang-lý into Phan Rí and Hamu Lithit or Mang-thit into Phan Thiết respectively. The three places are referred to as "Tam Phan" (Triple Phan).
- The name of the Cham Prince who served as the area's military governor in the 15th century was Po Thit (brother of the princess Po Sah Inư and son of King Par Ra Chăm Chanh or Trà Chanh). The fortification was thus called Camp Po Thit. The Vietnamese subsequently pronounced the camp name as "Phan Thiết."

== History ==
The first resorts along the beaches of Hưng Long and Phú Thủy wards, as well as Phú Hài and Hàm Tiến wards east of the city center opened in the mid-nineties. Since then, tourism has significantly expanded and hundreds of hotels, restaurants, resorts, guesthouses and shops have been constructed along the coastline.

Rang Beach in Hàm Tiến ward was discovered by foreigners in 1995 while witnessing the solar eclipse. Misled by guidebooks, which incorrectly labelled Rang Beach as "Mũi Né Beach", they were the initial tourists, along with many succeeding tourists mistakenly calling every region east of the Phan Thiết city center "Mũi Né."

This area was under the jurisdiction of ancient kingdom of Champa and later absorbed into the Đại Việt Empire (former name of Vietnam). Vietnamese rule was established over the area, which has since become the present-day province of Bình Thuận, although the administrative level and the boundaries of the area hadn't been determined during this time.

In 1697, Bình Thuận was changed from a fort ("trấn") to a district (phủ), then to a dinh. Later, Phan Thiết was officially recognized as a đạo (along with Phan Rang, Phố Hài and Ma Ly of the Tam Tân area).

From 1773 to 1801, fierce conclict between the forces of the Nguyễn dynasty and Tây Sơn dynasty occurred in the area.

In 1825, during the reign of Emperor Minh Mạng, Bình Thuận officially became a province; part of Phan Thiết was converted into the district of Hàm Thuận. In 1854, during Tự Đức's reign, the district was renamed Tuy Lý.

In 1836 (the 17th year of Minh Mạng's reign), cabinet officer Đào Tri Phủ was sent to Bình Thuận to oversee the surveying tasks and establish land boundaries for 307 communes and villages in fifteen districts of Bình Thuận in order to determine taxation. On the right bank of the river (currently Cà Ty river) were Đức Thắng, Nhuận Đức and Lạc Đạo village. On the left bank were Long Bình and Minh Long.

Near the end of the 19th century, Phan Thiết was not yet officially recognized as an administrative unit (lower level) within Bình Thuận province.

In 1898 (the 10th year of the reign of Emperor Thành Thái), Bình Thuận's provincial capital was moved to Phú Tài village, a suburb of Phan Thiết. On 20 October of that year, Thành Thái signed a decree to make Phan Thiết a city and provincial capital (on the same day as the establishment of the cities of Bình Thuận, Huế, Hội An, Qui Nhơn, Thanh Hóa and Vinh).

In the 20th century, it was a center of the VNQDĐ independence movement.

== Geography ==
Each area of Phan Thiết possesses its own characteristics. The beaches of Kê Gà and Tiến Thành are characterized by their tranquility, inviting tourists to embrace relaxation and swimming. Congestion on the roads along the coastline is seldom, allowing for physical activities such as walking or riding to experience fewer difficulties in regards to noise pollution.

In comparison to Nha Trang, the density of resorts along the beaches of the city center in Phan Thiết is relatively lessened, allowing residents and tourists to enter the liveliness of the Vietnamese city. Phan Thiết houses many restaurants, museums, and shopping malls along with the school where Hồ Chí Minh served as a teacher prior to studying in Paris.

Phú Hài ward encompasses a hill-inclined area along the coastline and has many small beaches and hidden coves. Many of the resorts in this ward are constructed above the water on the hills and possess a relatively small beach. Sea Links City, composed of a hotel, condos, apartments, a winery, and a golf course, is also located here. Ba Nai Hill in Phú Hài ward houses the Po Sah Inư Cham Tower, constructed in the 8th century.

Rang Beach, Hàm Tiến ward lies alongside a 10 kilometre strip. Hundreds of resorts, hotels, bars, restaurants, shops, travel agencies, and spas are situated in this area.

In recent years advanced beach erosion has become a significant issue in Phan Thiết's beaches, particularly in Phú Hài and Hàm Tiến wards, resulting in a lack of a high tide for some resorts as the water directly reaches the sea wall. In recent years, a number of resorts have installed geotechnical tubes (geotubes) in order to prevent their beaches from further erosion.

The so-called “Fairy Stream” is considered one of the great tourist attractions of Hàm Tiến, where a small creek carves a canyon through the dunes, revealing colorful layers of sand and limestone.

Beyond Hàm Tiến is Mũi Né, consisting of two communities which summate to approximately 25,000 residents along with two beaches. The second community is Hon Rom, a fishing village with a few hundred residents. Mũi Né has the highest population outside the city center and can become lively in the morning. In the evening, locals gather together for coffee or dinner across the many cafés and restaurants, especially around the local market.

Another tourist attraction is Po Sah Inu Cham Tower, Mũi Né Fishing Village and the orange sand dunes, located on a hill between Mũi Né and Hon Rom. At the entrance of Hon Rom is the "Red Canyon", a small cliff that has eroded to display a beautiful ridge, consisting of fragile red sand. The larger white sand dunes (Bàu Trắng) are around 23 kilometers north of the town in Vietnam.

Phan Thiết operators usually correlate a distinction between the Winter and Summer seasons. During Winter, a substantial proportion of tourists originate from Northern Europe and Russia, in order to escape the harsh winter conditions and to partake in kitesurfing and windsurfing. In the Summer season, Phan Thiết is a popular destination for Australian and North American tourists, as well as many locals seeking fresh sea wind breezes.

== Climate ==
Phan Thiết has a relatively dry tropical savanna climate (Köppen Aw) with the wet season occurring from May to mid-November, which is more typical of Southeastern Vietnam than of the Central Coast. Because the northeast trade winds from the distant Siberian High run parallel to the coast, unlike further north in cities like Da Nang and Huế, the northern winter is typically dry as for most of Indochina or South and East Asia.

Climate data for Phan Thiết
Month	Jan	Feb	Mar	Apr	May	Jun	Jul	Aug	Sep	Oct	Nov	Dec	Year
Record high °C (°F)	35.4 (95.7)	34.5 (94.1)	35.8 (96.4)	37.5 (99.5)	38.7 (101.7)	37.9 (100.2)	35.9 (96.6)	36.1 (97.0)	36.5 (97.7)	35.3 (95.5)	35.0 (95.0)	34.5 (94.1)	38.7 (101.7)
Mean daily maximum °C (°F)	29.2 (84.6)	29.5 (85.1)	30.5 (86.9)	31.8 (89.2)	32.6 (90.7)	32.2 (90.0)	31.5 (88.7)	31.5 (88.7)	31.3 (88.3)	30.9 (87.6)	30.8 (87.4)	29.9 (85.8)	31.0 (87.8)
Daily mean °C (°F)	25.0 (77.0)	25.5 (77.9)	26.7 (80.1)	28.2 (82.8)	28.6 (83.5)	27.8 (82.0)	27.2 (81.0)	27.1 (80.8)	27.1 (80.8)	27.1 (80.8)	26.7 (80.1)	25.7 (78.3)	26.9 (80.4)
Mean daily minimum °C (°F)	21.3 (70.3)	22.0 (71.6)	23.5 (74.3)	25.3 (77.5)	25.7 (78.3)	25.2 (77.4)	24.7 (76.5)	24.7 (76.5)	24.6 (76.3)	24.3 (75.7)	23.4 (74.1)	22.2 (72.0)	23.9 (75.0)
Record low °C (°F)	14.2 (57.6)	16.3 (61.3)	17.2 (63.0)	19.9 (67.8)	22.0 (71.6)	21.7 (71.1)	20.8 (69.4)	20.6 (69.1)	21.7 (71.1)	20.3 (68.5)	18.1 (64.6)	12.4 (54.3)	12.4 (54.3)
Average rainfall mm (inches)	3.5 (0.14)	0.3 (0.01)	5.1 (0.20)	29.9 (1.18)	143.8 (5.66)	143.3 (5.64)	171.5 (6.75)	166.0 (6.54)	187.3 (7.37)	158.6 (6.24)	55.4 (2.18)	20.8 (0.82)	1,089 (42.87)
Average rainy days	0.8	0.4	0.8	3.3	13.2	15.6	17.6	18.6	17.3	13.8	6.5	3.1	111.4
Average relative humidity (%)	75.0	75.3	76.6	77.7	79.8	81.4	83.2	83.5	84.3	83.3	79.9	76.8	79.7
Mean monthly sunshine hours	266.2	264.5	296.6	284.1	248.5	217.6	215.9	208.9	199.8	209.2	215.6	229.0	2,856.9
Source: Vietnam Institute for Building Science and Technology

== Administrative divisions ==
Phan Thiết is subdivided into 18 wards and communes, of which 14 are wards, namely: Đức Thắng, Đức Nghĩa, Đức Long, Phú Hài, Phú Thủy, Phú Trinh, Phú Tài, Thanh Hải, Hàm Tiến, Mũi Né, Xuân An, Bình Hưng, Hưng Long and Lạc Đạo, and 4 communes, namely: Tiến Lợi, Tiến Thành, Thiện Nghiệp and Phong Nẫm.

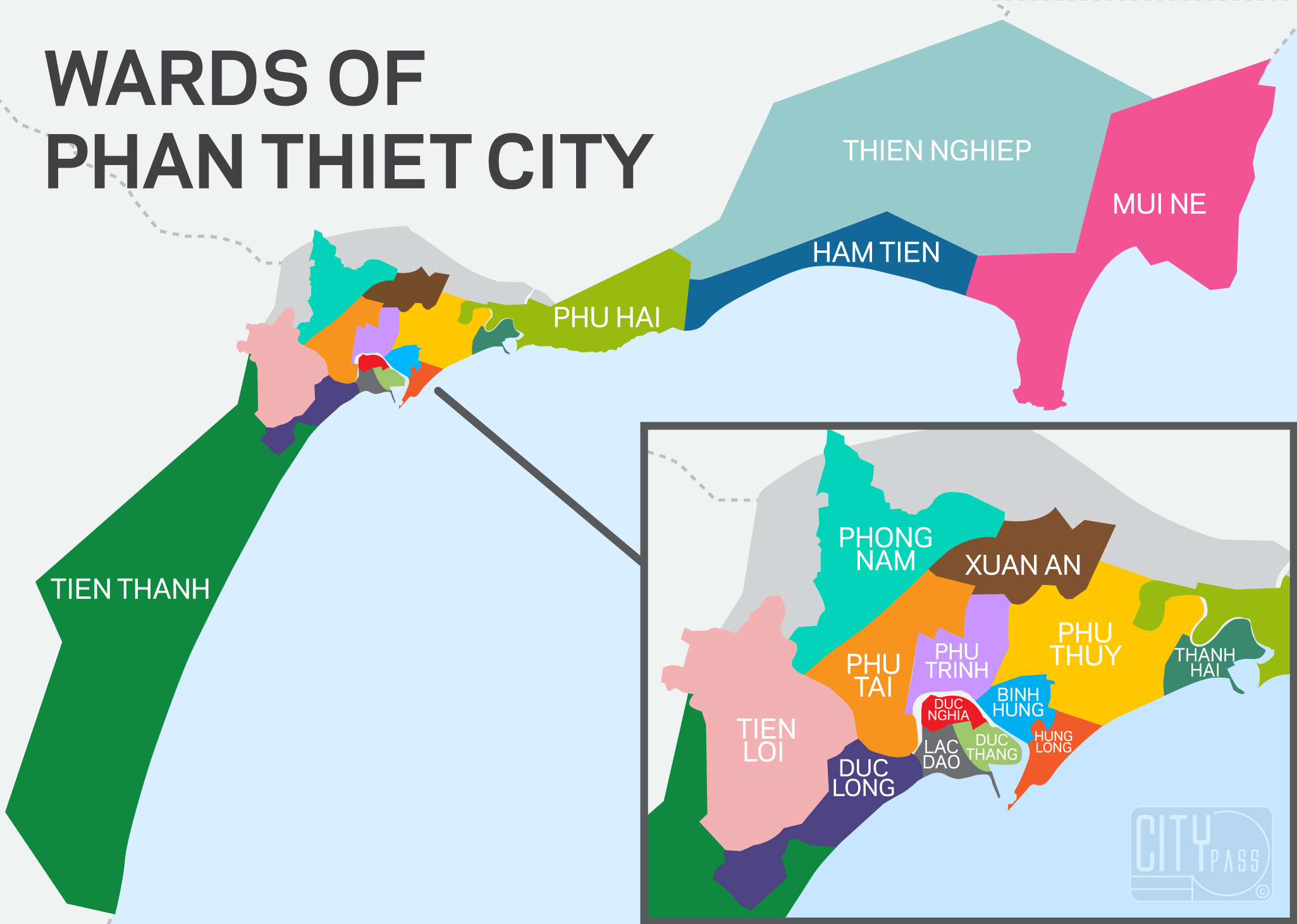
Color Map of the Wards of Phan Thiết

Located on an arm of the South China Sea, Phan Thiết is one of Vietnam's most significant fishing areas. Its population is roughly 230,000 (as of 2019). Hồ Chí Minh reportedly lived in Phan Thiết for a short time around 1910 and worked as a schoolteacher.

During the Vietnam War, Phan Thiết was the site of the U.S. military base known as Landing Zone Betty, which was located at the now closed airfield southwest of the city. In recent years, Phan Thiết (specifically Mũi Né Beach) has been transformed into a resort destination. 24 October 1995 is considered to be the birth of tourism in Phan Thiết, when thousands visited Mũi Né to witness the total solar eclipse. The event was commemorated on the same day in 2005 as the tenth anniversary of tourism for the province. Local people in Phan Thiết regularly practice a ceremony to a whale god, which is believed to provide good luck in nautical pursuits.

== Photos of Phan Thiết ==
Bridge in Phan Thiết

Hotel in Phan Thiết

Statue in Phan Thiết

Street in Phan Thiết

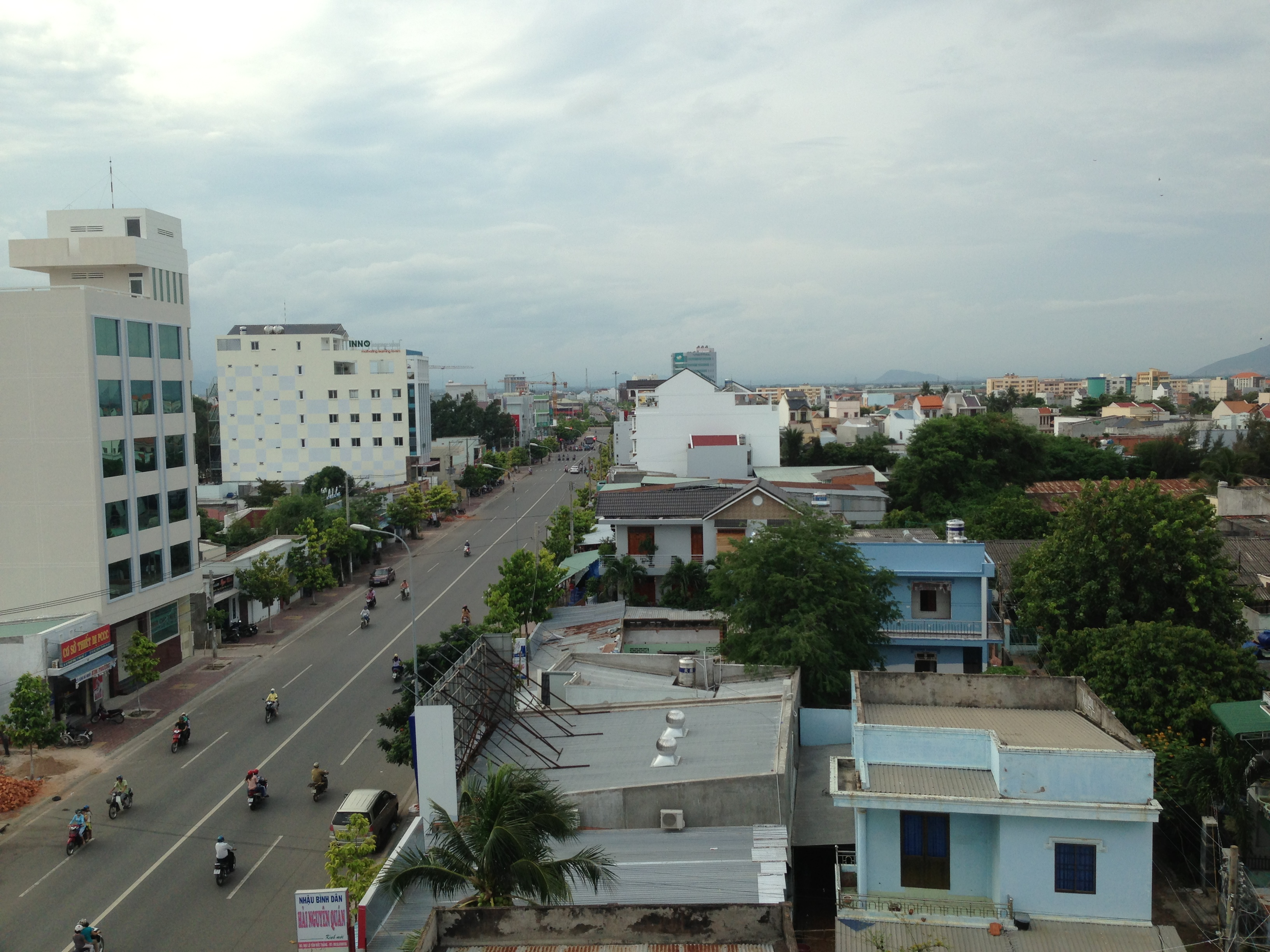
Street in Phan Thiết

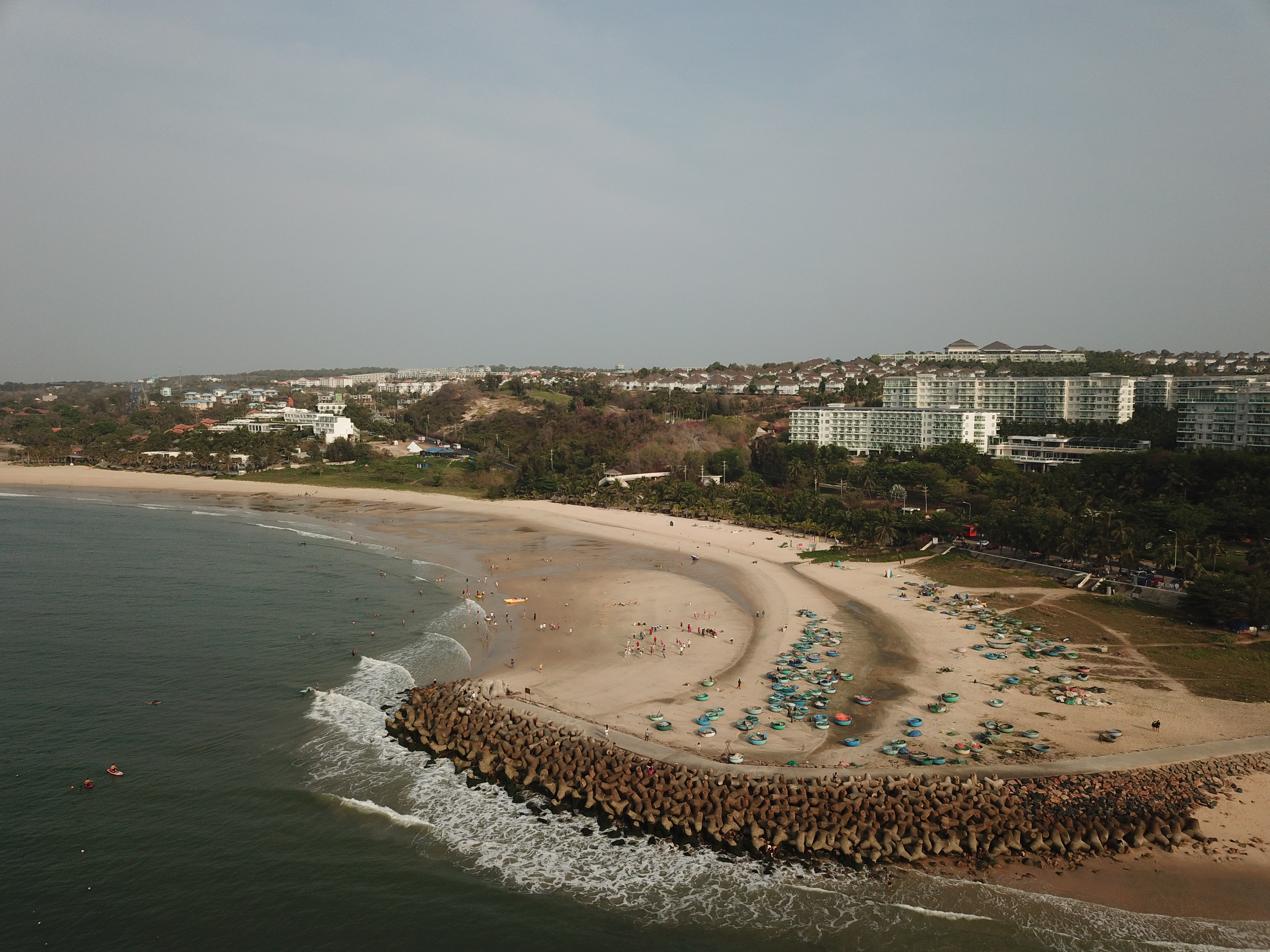
Beach in Phan Thiết

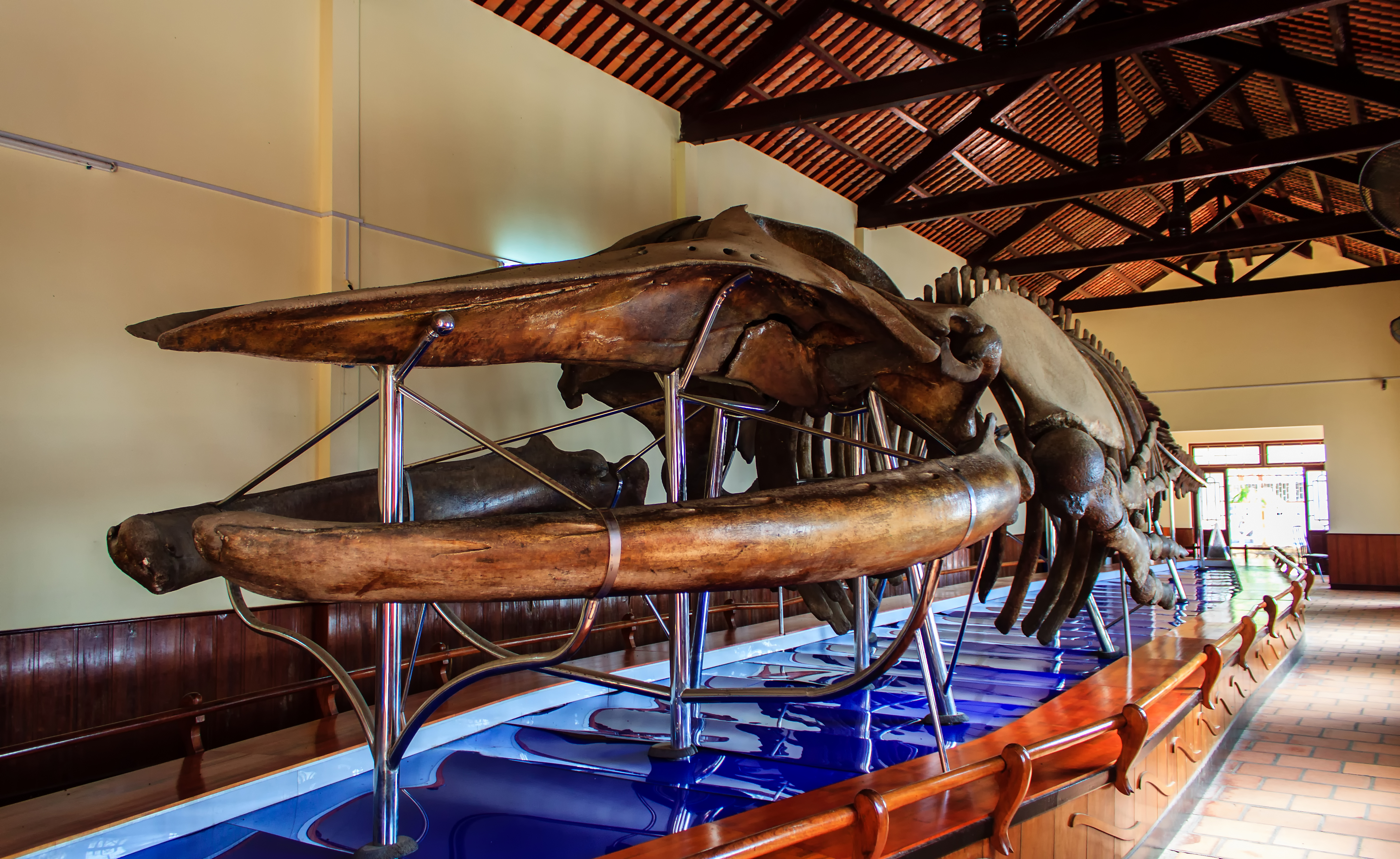
Vạn Thủy Tú temple, one of the Vietnamese Whale worship sites, hosts the largest whale skeleton in Vietnam.

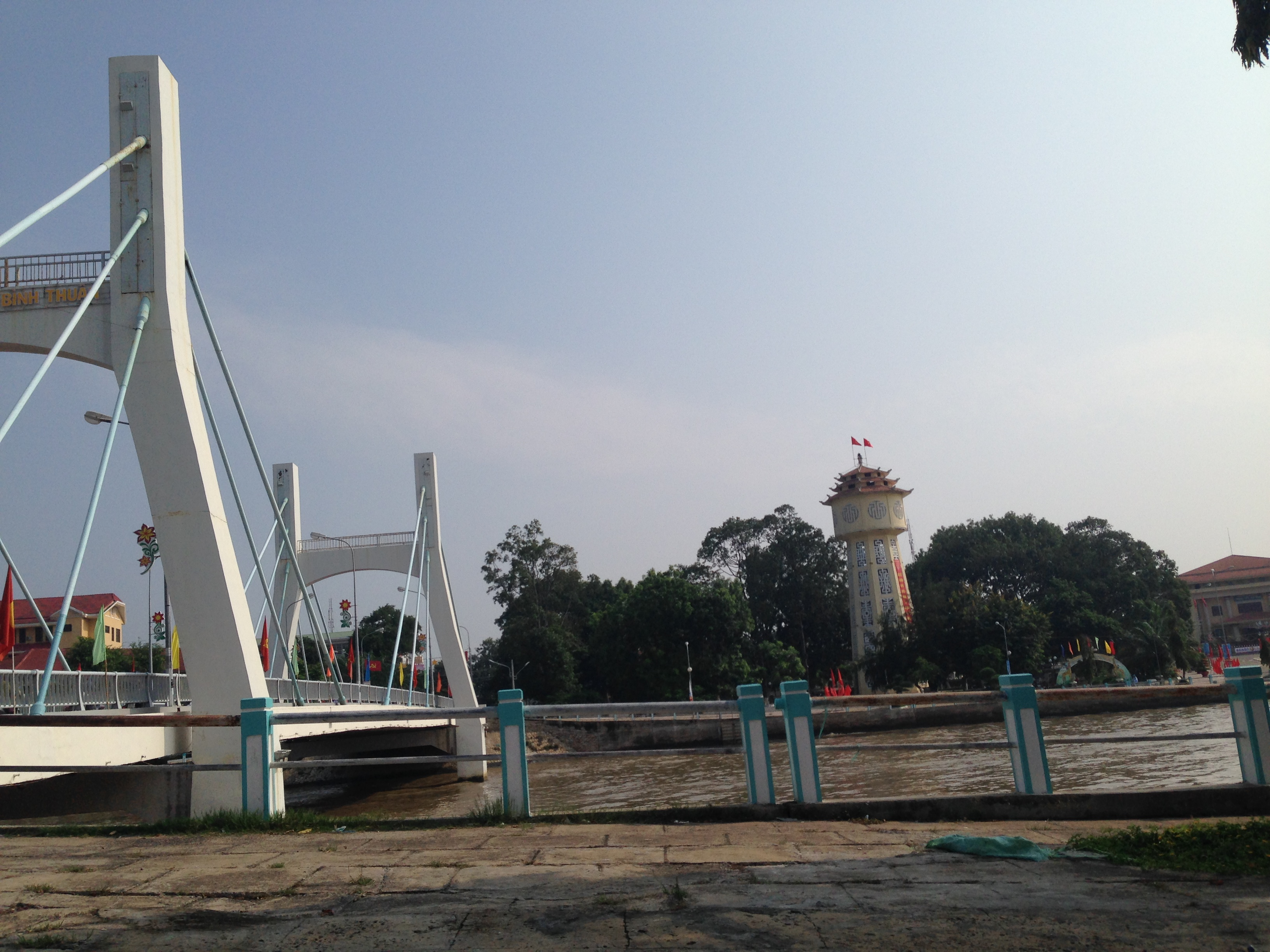
