= Phước Hội =

- Ward
- Diên Hồng 2 Street
- Interactive map of Phước Hội
- Coordinates: 10.658851237710675°N 107.77472044430473°E
- Country: Vietnam
- Region: South Central Coast and Central Highlands
- Province: Lâm Đồng
- Established: 5 September 2005
- Administrative headquarters: 01 Diên Hồng 2 Street, Residential Group 5

Area
  - Total: 38.09 km^{2} (14.71 sq mi)

Population (31 December 2024)
  - Total: 49,480
  - Density: 1,299/km^{2} (3,360/sq mi)
- Website: phuochoi.lamdong.gov.vn

Phước Hội is a ward in Lâm Đồng province, Vietnam.

On 16 June 2025, the Standing Committee of the National Assembly of Vietnam issued Resolution No. 1671/NQ-UBTVQH15 on the arrangement of commune-level administrative units in Lâm Đồng province in 2025. Under the resolution, the entire area and population of Phước Hội and Phước Lộc wards and Tân Phước commune, formerly part of La Gi, Bình Thuận province, were merged to form a new ward named Phước Hội.
