= La Gi =

- Ward
- Nguyễn Huệ Park
- Interactive map of La Gi
- Coordinates: 10.688253462455343°N 107.75723648416005°E
- Country: Vietnam
- Region: South Central Coast and Central Highlands
- Province: Lâm Đồng
- Established: 1 July 2025

Area
  - Total: 68.47 km^{2} (26.44 sq mi)

Population (31 December 2024)
  - Total: 60,549
  - Density: 884/km^{2} (2,290/sq mi)
- Website: lagi.lamdong.gov.vn

La Gi is a ward in Lâm Đồng province, Vietnam.

On 16 June 2025, the Standing Committee of the National Assembly of Vietnam issued Resolution No. 1671/NQ-UBTVQH15 on the arrangement of commune-level administrative units in Lâm Đồng province in 2025. Under the resolution, the entire area and population of Tân An, Bình Tân, and Tân Thiện wards and Tân Bình commune, all formerly part of La Gi town, Bình Thuận province, were merged to form a new ward named La Gi.
