= Bình Thuận mine =

Mine in Bình Thuận, Vietnam

Location
- Location: Bình Thuận Province, Vietnam

Production
- Products: Nickel

The Bình Thuận mine is a large mine in the south of Vietnam in the Bình Thuận Province. Bình Thuận represents one of the largest nickel reserve in Vietnam having estimated reserves of 520 million tonnes of ore grading 1% nickel. The 520 million tonnes of ore contains 5.2 million tonnes of nickel metal.
