= Đức Linh =

Đức Linh Xã Đức Linh
- Commune
- Đức Linh commune
- Location within Vietnam
- Coordinates: 11°11′16″N 107°34′00″E
- Country: Vietnam
- Region: South Central Coast
- Province: Lâm Đồng
- Time zone: UTC+7 (UTC + 7)

Đức Linh is a commune (xã) of Lâm Đồng Province, Vietnam. It is one of the 124 new wards, communes and special zones of the province following the reorganization in 2025.

On June 16, 2025, the Standing Committee of the National Assembly issued Resolution No. 1671/NQ-UBTVQH15 on the arrangement of commune-level administrative units in Lâm Đồng province in 2025. Accordingly, the entire natural area and population of Võ Xu township, Nam Chính commune, and Vũ Hòa commune (Đức Linh district) were consolidated into a new commune named Đức Linh commune.
