= Hàm Tân =

Hàm Tân Xã Hàm Tân
- Commune
- Hàm Tân commune
- Location within Vietnam
- Coordinates: 10°49′24″N 107°43′36″E
- Country: Vietnam
- Region: South Central Coast
- Province: Lâm Đồng
- Time zone: UTC+7 (UTC + 7)

Hàm Tân is a commune (xã) of Lâm Đồng Province, Vietnam. It is one of the 124 new wards, communes and special zones of the province following the reorganization in 2025.

On June 16, 2025, the Standing Committee of the National Assembly issued Resolution No. 1671/NQ-UBTVQH15 on the reorganization of commune-level administrative units in Lâm Đồng province in 2025. Accordingly, the entire natural area and population of Tân Nghĩa township and the communes of Tân Hà and Tân Xuân (Hàm Tân district) were merged to form a new commune named Hàm Tân Commune.
