= Bình Thuận province =

Former province of Vietnam

- Province
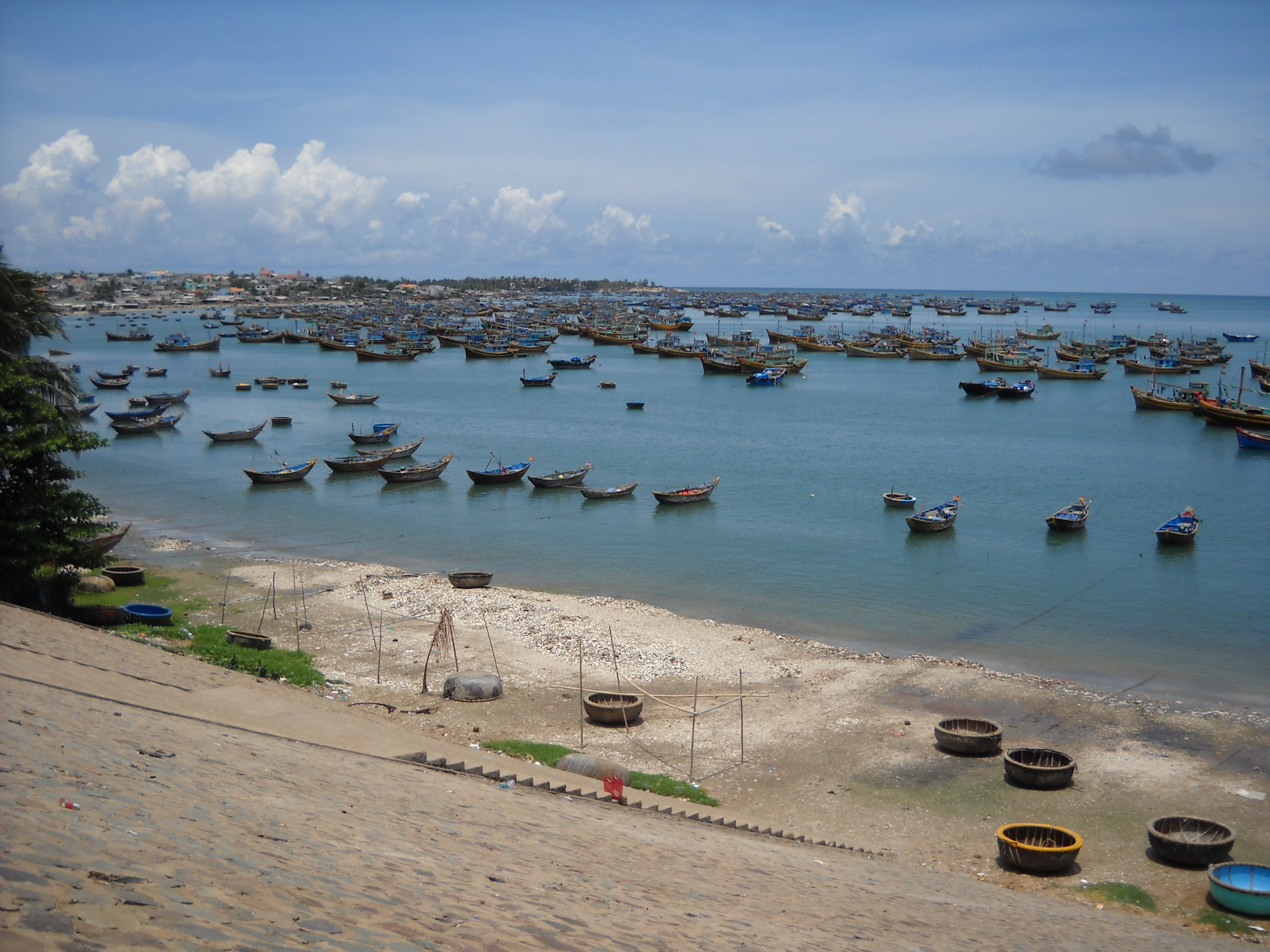
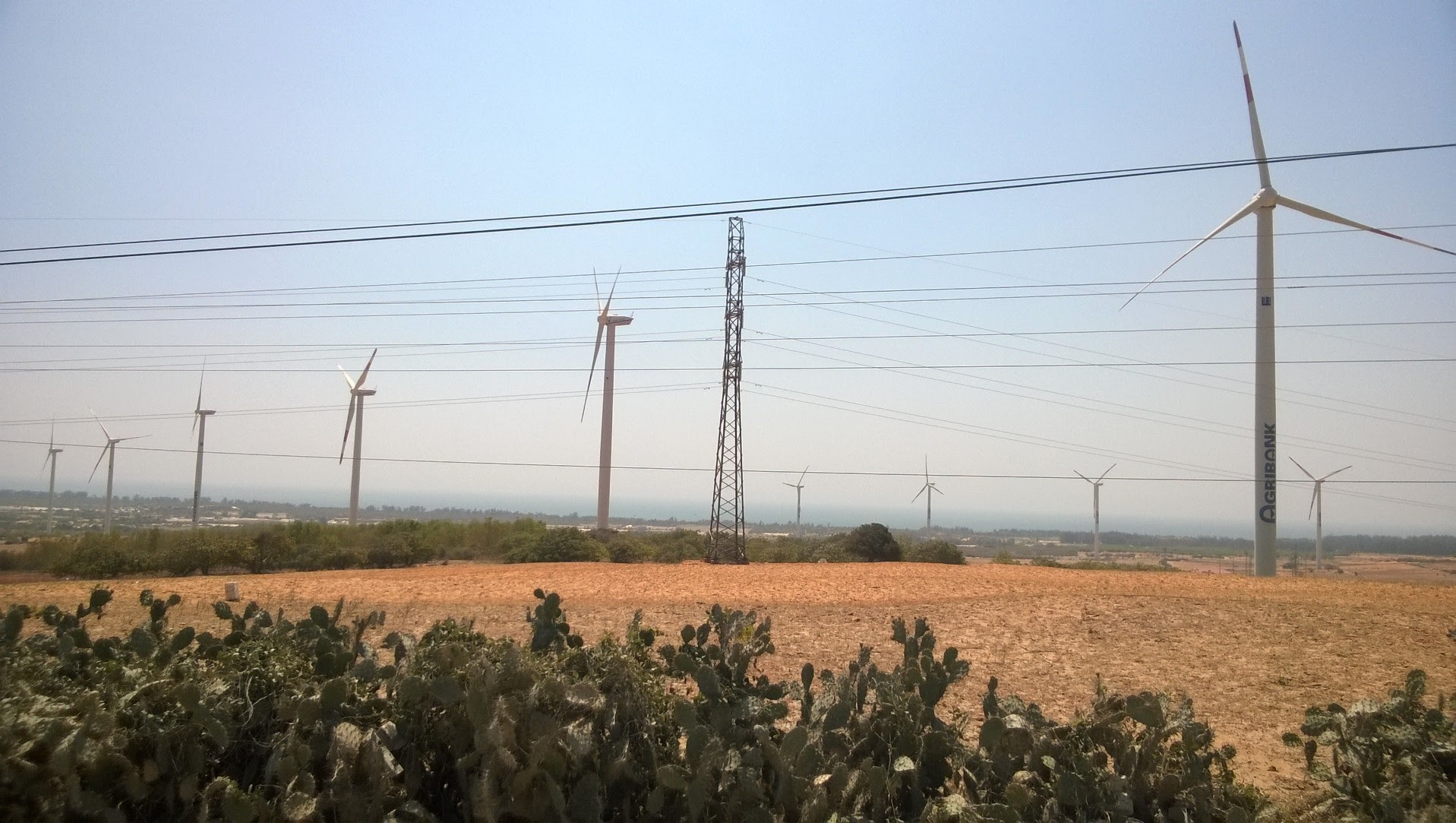
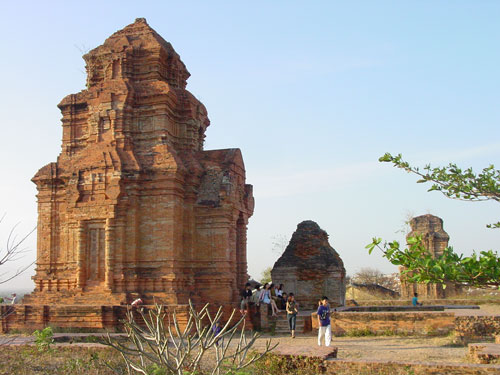
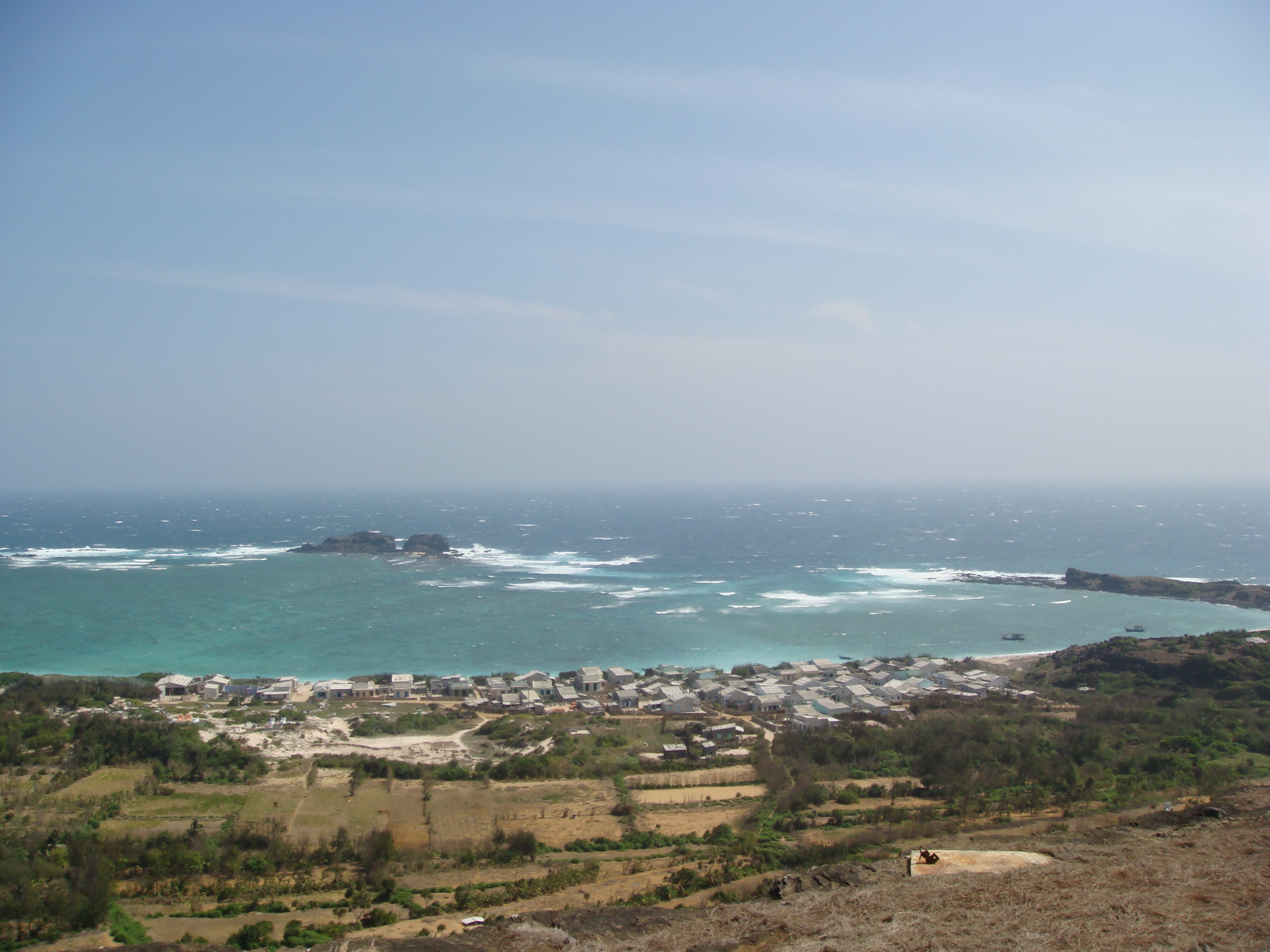
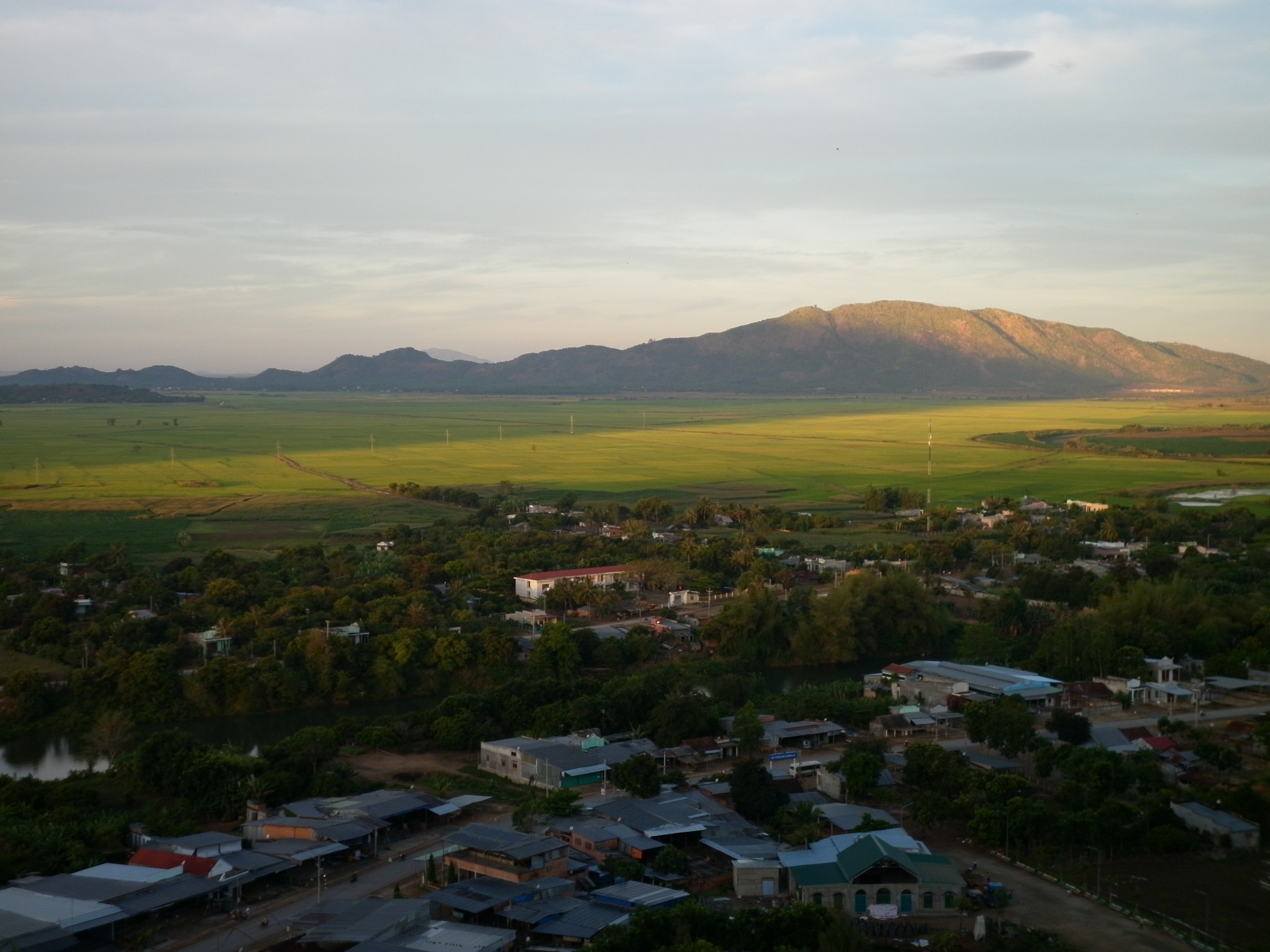
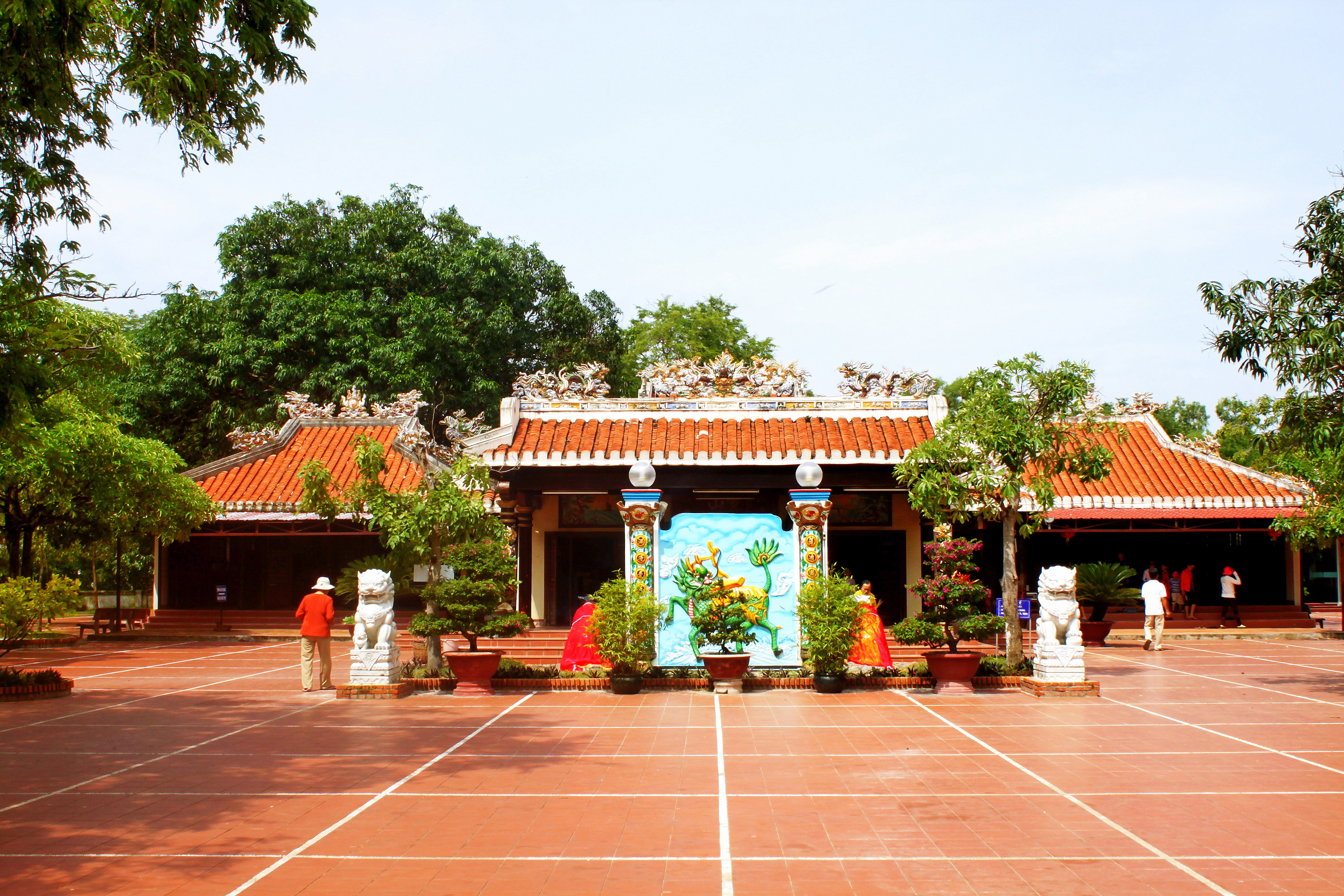
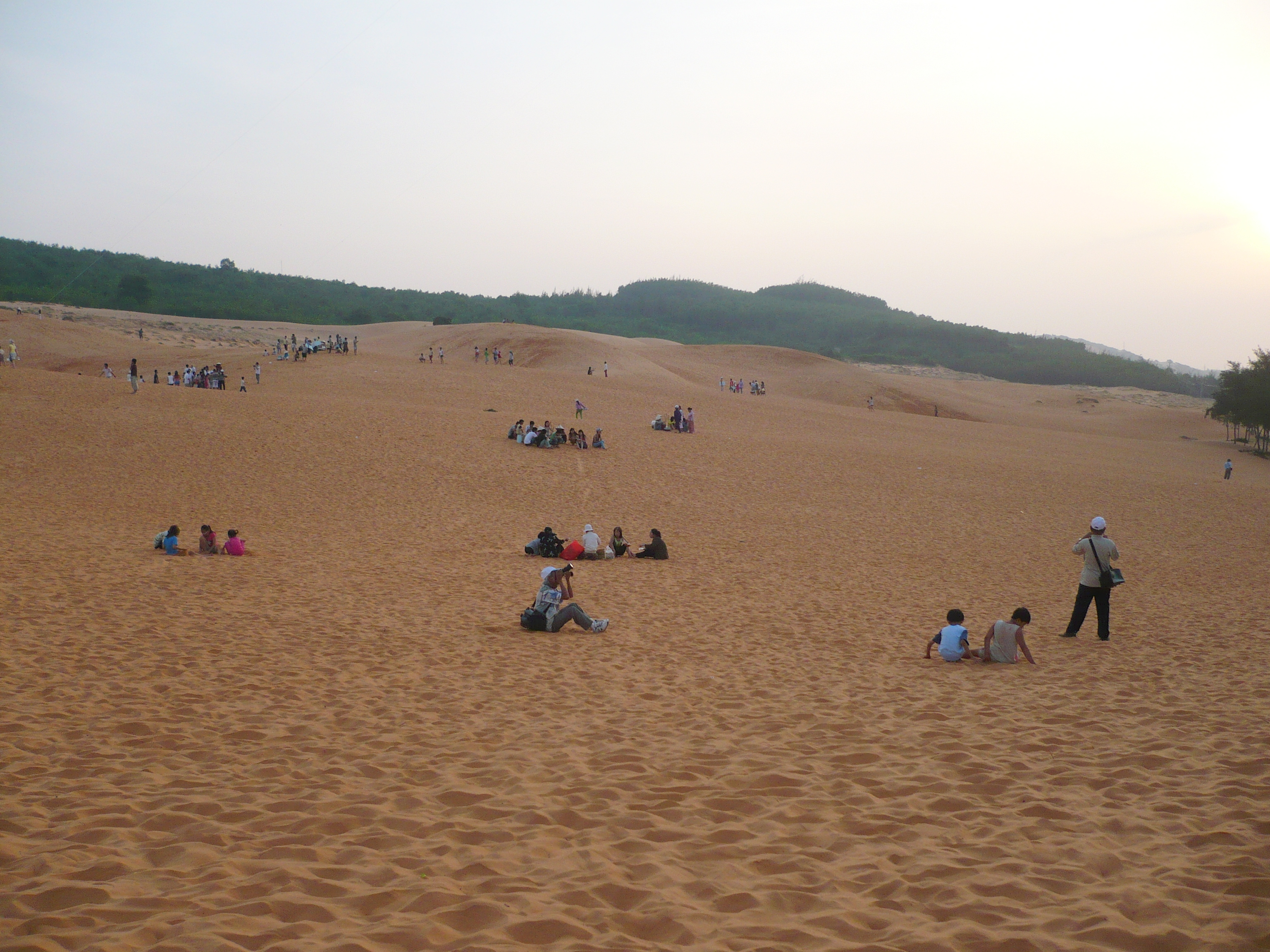
- (left-to-right, top-to-bottom) Fishing villages in Mũi Né, Phan Thiết • Bình Thạnh Windfarm • Po Sah Inư Tower • Phú Quý • Mt. Tà Pao • Thầy Thím Palace, La Gi • Mũi Né Sand Dunes

- Seal
- Nickname: Home of Pitaya
- Location of Bình Thuận within Vietnam
- Coordinates: 10°56′N 108°6′E
- Country: Vietnam
- Region: South Central Coast
- Capital: Phan Thiết

Government
  - People's Council Chair: Nguyễn Mạnh Hùng
  - People's Committee Chair: Nguyễn Ngọc Hai

Area
  - Total: 7,942.60 km^{2} (3,066.66 sq mi)

Population (2025)
  - Total: 1,531,253
  - Density: 192.790/km^{2} (499.324/sq mi)

Demographics
  - Ethnicities: Kinh, Cham, Tanka, K'Ho, Roglai

GDP
  - Total: VND 62.340 trillion US$ 2.745 billion
- Time zone: UTC+7 (ICT)
- Area codes: 62 (until 16 July 2017); 252 (from 17 June 2017)
- ISO 3166 code: VN-40
- HDI (2020): ▲0.703 (35th)
- Website: binhthuan.gov.vn

Bình Thuận was a former southernmost coastal province in the South Central Coast region, the Central of Vietnam. It borders Lâm Đồng to the north, Ninh Thuận to the northeast, Đồng Nai to the west, Bà Rịa–Vũng Tàu to the southwest and the South China Sea to the east.

Bình Thuận province is sometimes seen as part of the Southeast region. The province is known for its scenery and beaches. There are also a number of sites of archaeological significance.

On June 12, 2025, Bình Thuận was incorporated into Lâm Đồng province.

== History ==
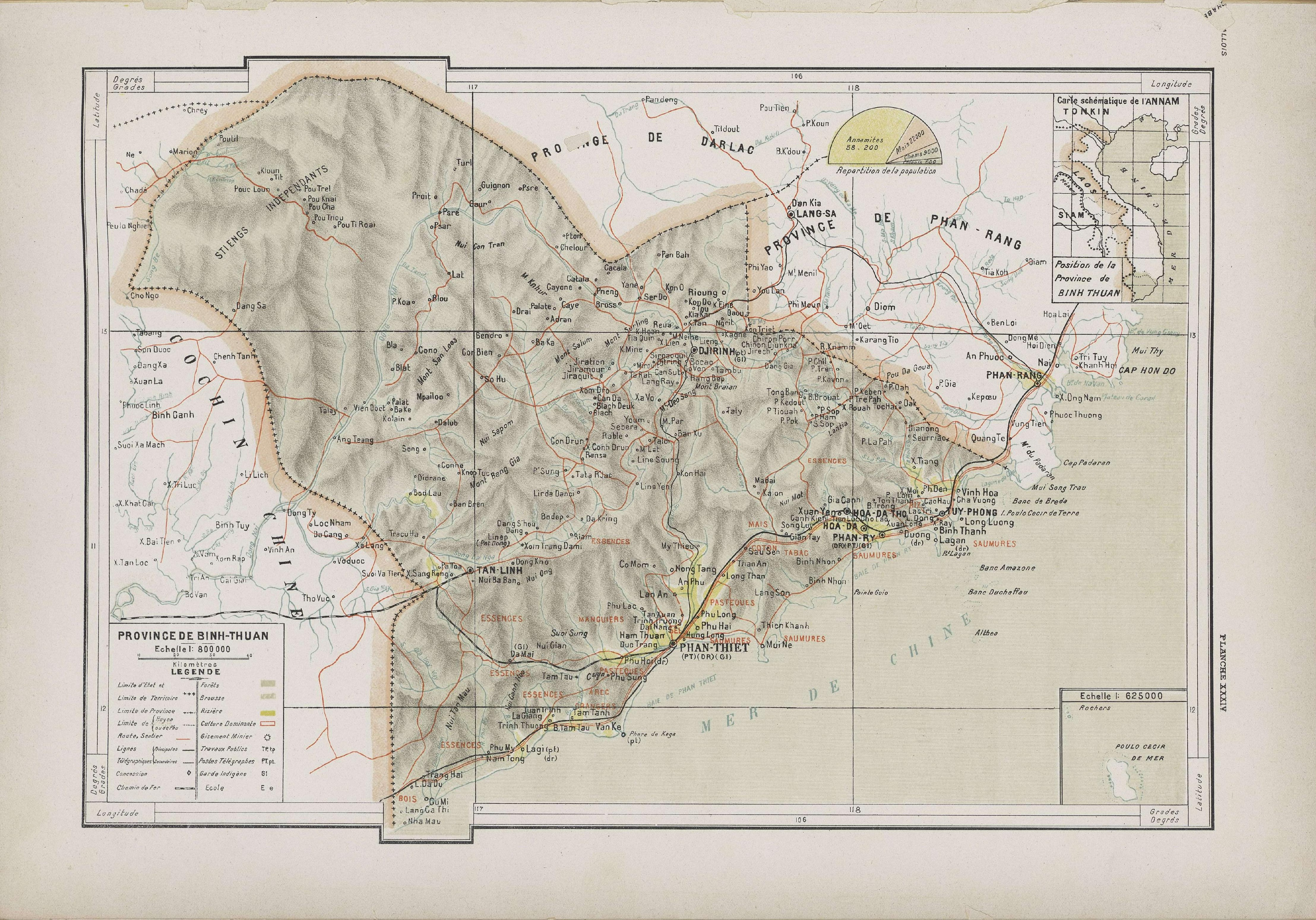
Map of Binh Thuan province in 1909

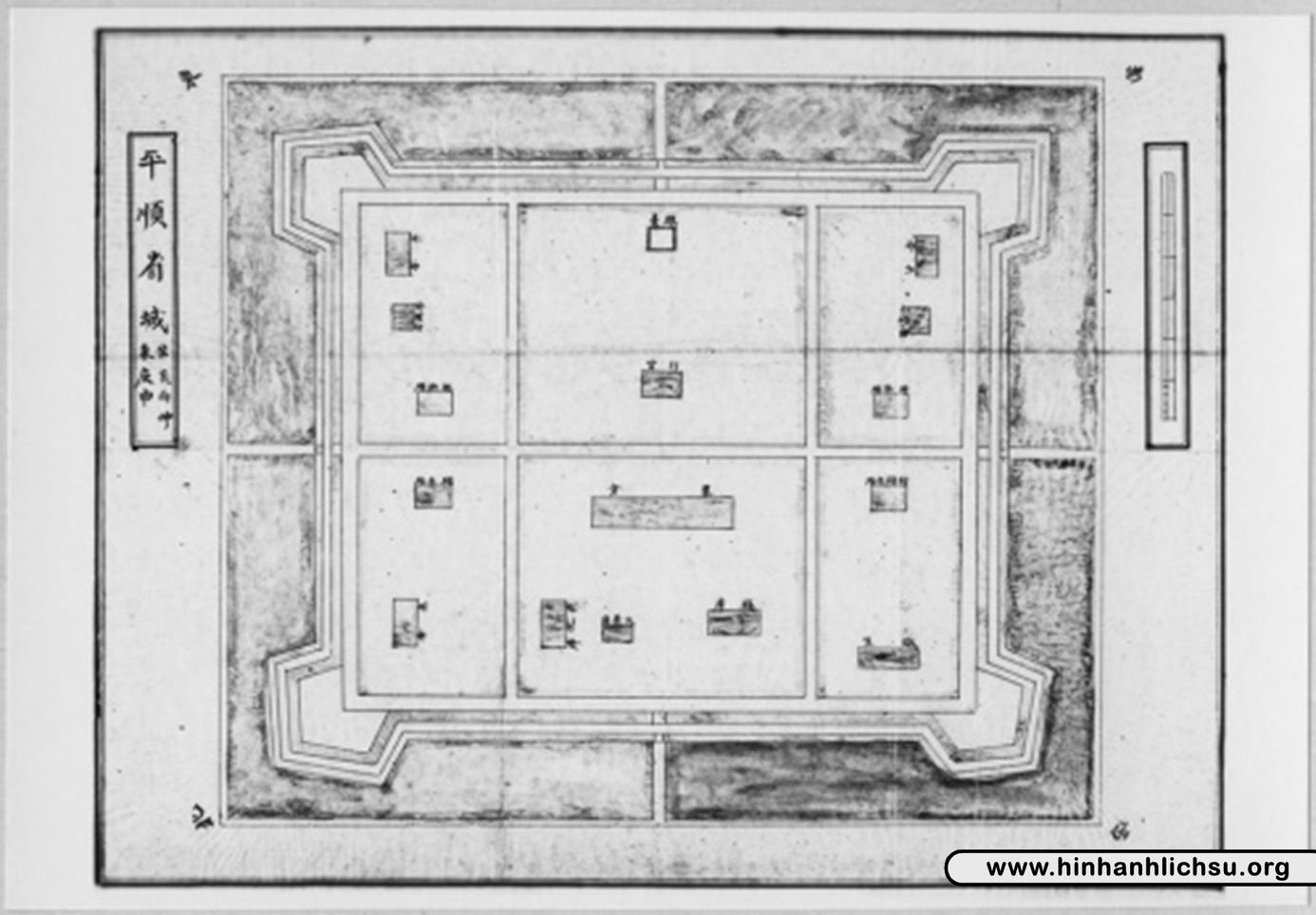
Drawing of Bình Thuận citadel in the Nguyễn dynasty

Much of what is now Bình Thuận province was part of the Cham principality of Panduranga, which had its political centre in neighbouring Ninh Thuận province. It was the last independent principality after the fall of Vijaya in 1471. Both Ninh Thuận and Bình Thuận were later incorporated into Vietnam in 1832. Before 1976, Bình Thuận province was much smaller because much of the west was in the separate Bình Tuy province). Bình Tuy, Bình Thuận and Ninh Thuận were merged in 1976 to form Thuận Hải province. It was divided again into Ninh Thuận and Binh Thuận in 1991, while Bình Tuy remained part of Bình Thuận Province.

On 12 June 2025, as part of major nationwide reforms, Bình Thuận province was dissolved and merged with Lâm Đồng province.

== Geography ==
Bình Thuận has much of the borders with Lâm Đồng and Ninh Thuận are mountainous, while much of the rest of the province is relatively flat. However, there are several hills with a height of at least 200 m along the coast of the province. The highest peak in the province (1548m) is in northwestern Tánh Linh District, near Lâm Đồng. Phú Quý island is located around 120 km south-east of Phan Thiết. It is a separate district. There are several much smaller islands off the coast of Bình Thuận, including Câu Island (cù lao Câu) in the east, Lao Island (hòn Lao) at Mũi Né, and Bà Island (hòn Bà) in the west.

Bình Thuận has several rivers mostly originating in the province itself or in the highlands of neighboring Lâm Đồng Province. Most flow into the South China Sea. Some of the major rivers are the Luỹ River (Sông Luỹ) in the east, the Cái River (Sông Cái) in the centre, and the Dinh River (Sông Dinh) in the west. La Ngà River (Sông La Ngà) flows through four districts in the northwest of the province and is a major tributary of the Đồng Nai River. The largest lake is Sông Quán Lake (hồ Sông Quán) in the centre of the province around 30 km north of Phan Thiết. Another major lake is Biển Lạc in the northwest region of the province.

As of 2007, 50% of the province (394,100 ha) is covered with forests, which is high compared to most other provinces of the South Central Coast region. Forests are mostly located in the province's mountainous regions in the northwest and northeast. Despite its large forested area, the province also has a lot of agricultural land. 284,200 ha were used for agriculture in 2007, which is the largest figure among all provinces of the central coast regions (both North Central and South Central).

Bình Thuận is one of the aridest provinces in Vietnam. Much of the province receives less than 800 mm of rain per year. The months from November to April are particularly dry, with less than 200 mm of rain. It has reserves of arsenic in the northwestern mountains and titanium along its western coast.

== Demography ==
Bình Thuận had a population of 1,170,700 people in 2007. The population grew by 1.35% per year on average between 2000 and 2007. Growth was particularly strong in urban areas at 4.42% per year on average. As a result, urbanisation increased from 30.4% in 2000 to 37.5% in 2007, making it one of the most urbanized provinces of the South Central Coast (second after Khánh Hòa province). Population density ranges from around 1000/km^{2} in Phan Thiết to less than 100/km^{2} in the districts of Bắc Bình, Hàm Tân, Hàm Thuận Nam and Tánh Linh.

Apart from the majority Kinh, there are several ethnic minorities in the province. Some Cham communities are in the coastal regions of eastern Bình Thuận. Other minorities mainly inhabit the mountainous regions along the border with Lâm Đồng province. They include the Koho and Raglai.

== Ethnic groups ==
The majority ethnic group in the province is Vietnamese (Kinh). There are also significant minorities such as the Cham, Raglai, Koho, and Hoa.

Ethnic group	Population	%
Kinh	1,133,802	91.53%
Cham	39,557	3.19%
Raglai	17,382	1.40%
Koho	13,531	1.09%
Hoa	9,917	0.80%
Tay	5,978	0.48%
Cho Ro	3,777	0.30%
Nung	2,529	0.20%
Jarai	1,778	0.14%
Khmer	830	0.07%
Muong	788	0.06%
Thai	230	0.02%
Ngai	188	0.02%
H're	116	0.01%
San Diu	74	<0.01%
Dao	47	<0.01%
Rade	42	<0.01%
San Chay	42	<0.01%
Tho	35	<0.01%
Ma	33	<0.01%
Mnong	27	<0.01%
Stieng	21	<0.01%
Nguoi Nuoc Ngoai (foreigner)	15	<0.01%
Cor	13	<0.01%
Churu	8	<0.01%
Khang	7	<0.01%
Ta Oi	6	<0.01%
Xo Dang	6	<0.01%
Bahnar	5	<0.01%
Bru–Van Kieu	5	<0.01%
Gelao	5	<0.01%
Khong Xac Dinh (unknown)	3	<0.01%
Jeh-Tariang	2	<0.01%
Khmu	2	<0.01%
Hmong	2	<0.01%
Pathen	2	<0.01%
Giay	1	<0.01%
O Du	1	<0.01%
Ksingmul	1	<0.01%
Bouyei	0	0%
Brau	0	0%
Chut	0	0%
Hani	0	0%
Katu	0	0%
Lachi	0	0%
Laha	0	0%
Lahu	0	0%
Lao	0	0%
Lo Lo	0	0%
Mang	0	0%
Phu La	0	0%
Phunoi	0	0%
Qabiao	0	0%
Ro Mam	0	0%
Si La	0	0%
Tai Lue	0	0%

== Administration ==
Bình Thuận is subdivided into 10 district-level sub-divisions :

- 8 districts:
- Bắc Bình
- Đức Linh
- Hàm Thuận Bắc
- Hàm Thuận Nam
- Hàm Tân
- Phú Quý
- Tánh Linh
- Tuy Phong

1 district-level town:

- La Gi

1 provincial city:

- Phan Thiết (capital)

They are further subdivided into 12 commune-level towns (or townlets), 96 communes, and 19 wards.

=== Cham villages ===
Cham names for Cham villages in Bình Thuận province are as follows (Sakaya et al. 2014:757-758).

- Tuy Phong District
  - Cawait: Lạc Trị
  - Mânâng Krueic: Cao Hậu and Phú Điền
  - Plom: Tuy Tịnh
  - Karang: Vĩnh Hanh
- Bắc Bình District
  - Dhaong Panan: Bình Tiến
  - Pa-aok: Bình Tiến
  - Ranjoh: Bình Tiến
  - Hamu Ak: Bình Tiến
  - Jraow: Bình Tiến
  - Hamu Rok: Bình Tiến
  - Ragaok: Bình Đức
  - Yok Yang: Bình Hiếu
  - Canan: Tịnh Mỹ
  - Bah Ribaong: Trí Thái
  - Sah Bingu: Mai Lãnh
  - Gaok Lithei: An Lạc
  - Aia Mâmih: Bình Minh
  - Panat: Bình Thắng
  - Dik: Bình Hòa
  - Cakak: Cảnh Diễn
  - Caraih: Châu Hanh
  - Njen: Thanh Kiết
- Hàm Thuận Bắc District
  - Hamu Kam: Ma Lâm 3
  - Craoh Tang: Lâm Thuận
  - Jamau: Giang Mâu
  - Lam Bal: Lâm Thành
  - Aia Ru: Hàm Trí
  - Hamu Ciét: Hàm Trí
  - Aia Ru: Đồng Tre
- Hàm Thuận Nam District
  - Hala Puen: Hiệp Nghĩa
  - Mali: Hiệp Hòa
- Tánh Linh District
  - Bicam: khu phố Chăm Lạc Tánh
  - Danaw Halin
- Hàm Tân District
  - Bhumi: Làng Chăm

== Economy ==
Bình Thuận had a GDP per capita of 11 million VND in 2007, which is the third highest in the South Central Coast after Đà Nẵng and Khánh Hòa province, and slightly higher than the regional average of 10.8 million. The economy has been the fastest growing in the South Central Coast with an average yearly growth of almost 14% from 2000 to 2007, with growth of all three sectors of the economy significantly exceeding the regional average. Agriculture, forestry and fishing had an average growth of 7.4%, industry 21.6%, and services 15.4%.

=== Agriculture, forestry, fishing ===
Bình Thuận is a relatively large producer of rice. 434,600 t were harvested in 2007. This is a significant increase from 2000 (321,500 t), although the area used for growing rice did not increase significantly (93,100 ha to 96,400 ha). Roughly one third of the province's agricultural land is used to cultivate rice, less than many other provinces.

Crop	Area	Output (2007)	% of national	Main location(s)
Cotton	1900 ha	2000 t	12.4%	Bắc Bình (E)
Cashew nuts	30,971 ha	17,565 t	5.82%	Đức Linh, Tánh Linh (NW), Hàm Tân, La Gi (SW)
Pepper	2091 ha	2326 t	2.58%	Đức Linh (NW)
Maize	19,800 ha	100,700 t	2.45%	Hàm Tân (SW)
Rubber	20,538 ha	12,332 t	2.05%	Đức Linh (NW)
Rice	96,400 ha	434,600 t	1.21%	Hàm Thuận Nam (central)

Bình Thuận has increased the area used for some crops significantly over the last few years, including rubber, pepper and cashew nuts, while cultivation of sugar-cane and sweet potatoes has been shrinking. There are large fishing grounds off the coast of Bình Thuận and around Phú Quý island, including shrimp, squid, and tuna. However, their contribution to the local economy is relatively small compared to agriculture. Forestry has made a very small contribution to the economy of the province and its growth has been slow from 2000 to 2007. The largest increase has actually been in forest cultivation rather than exploitation of forest products.

=== Industry ===
Bình Thuận's industry has been booming in the first years of the 21st century, with average an average growth rate of 21.6% until 2007. Bình Thuận's industrial development is currently facing problems of land management. Licensed industrial parks have been found to overlap with titanium reserves and their development may be delayed as a result. The province has seen a decline in state industry from 2000 to 2007. The private sector now makes up most of industrial output and even the foreign-invested sector has overtaken state-owned industry. Despite its spectacular growth, industry was not able to absorb much of the growth of the labour force. It created 17,200 new jobs between 2000 and 2007, while the slower growing service sector created 44,100 and even agriculture, forestry and fishing created 57,600 jobs.

=== Mining ===
- Bình Thuận mine

== Infrastructure ==
=== Transport ===
Bình Thuận is located along Vietnam's main north-south transport corridors. National Route 1 runs through the province, connecting 6 out of the province's 10 districts to the rest of the country. Bình Thuận's main railway station along the North–South Railway is Mương Mán Railway Station, located around 10 km northwest of Phan Thiết. Four smaller railway stations are in Phan Thiết and the eastern part of the province.

The province is connected to the Central Highlands by two national roads: 28 from Phan Thiết to Di Linh and Đắk Nông province and 55 from Vũng Tàu to La Gi and Bảo Lộc. Bình Thuận does not have an airport; the nearest commercial airport is located near Đà Lạt.

=== Energy ===
Hàm Thuận hydropower plant is located in the northwest of the province. Bình Thuận is the site of several new energy projects and will be important for Vietnam's diversification away from hydropower. Bình Thuận has significant potential for wind power generation, estimated at 3,000 MW. The wind power project in Tuy Phong District, was set to be hooked up to the national electricity grid by 2009. The large wind energy project is expected to help boost regional socio-economic development and pave the way for further exploitation of renewable energy sources in the country. Located on Highway 1, the section running through Bình Thuận Commune, the Wind Power Plant 1 is about 300 meters from the coast. This is an arid area usually short in rainfall but abundant in wind. Other wind power projects are in preparation, with 12 licenses issued as of August 2010. However, the land for many of these projects overlaps with land with rich titanium reserves. These overlaps have remained unresolved for several years.

A thermoelectric plant is under construction in Tuy Phong District in the east of the province. It is a cooperation of EVN and Chinese investors and projected to generate 1,200MW of electricity.
