= Đức Linh district =

Coordinates: 11°11′43″N 107°31′34″E

Đức Linh district Huyện Đức Linh
- District
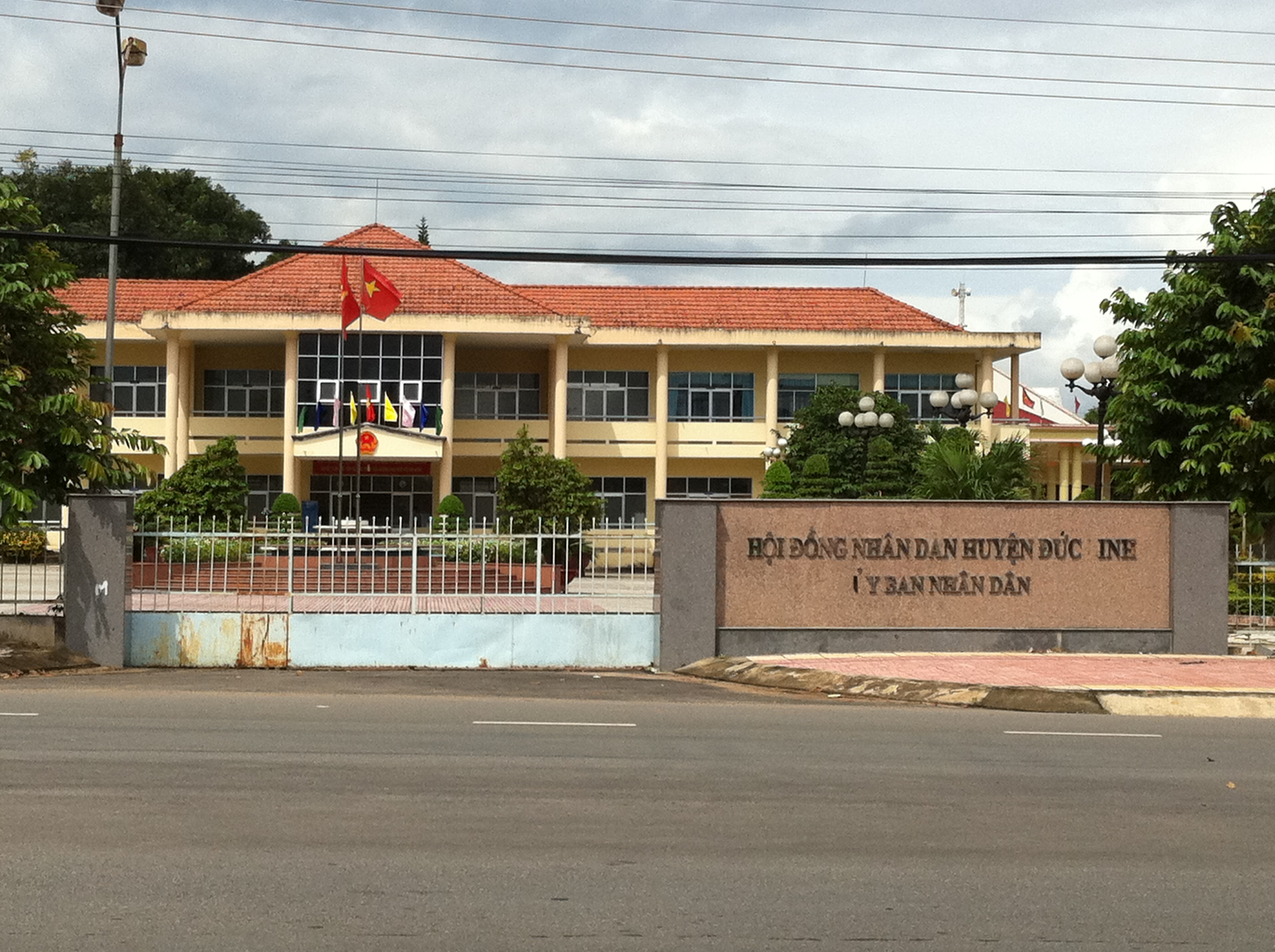
- Đức Linh's People committee building

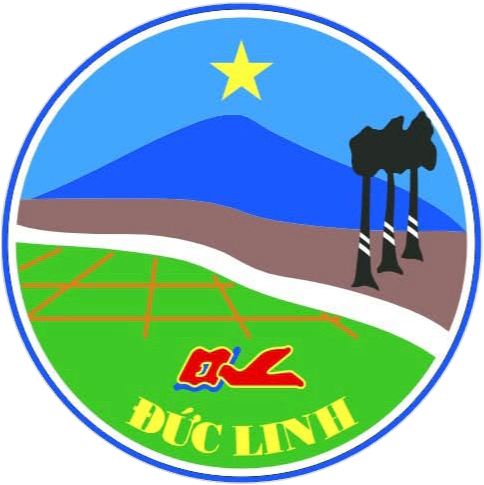
- Seal
- Interactive map of Đức Linh district
- Country: Vietnam
- Region: Southeast
- Province: Bình Thuận
- Capital: Võ Xu

Area
  - Land: 207 sq mi (536 km^{2})

Population (2019 census)
  - District: 126,035
  - Density: 609/sq mi (235/km^{2})
  - Urban: 35,201
- Time zone: UTC+07:00 (Indochina Time)

Đức Linh is a former rural district of Bình Thuận province in the Southeast region of Vietnam. As of 2003, the district had a population of 126,035. The district covers an area of 536 km^{2}. The district capital lies at Võ Xu.
