= Hàm Thuận Nam =

Hàm Thuận Nam Xã Hàm Thuận Nam
- Commune
- Hàm Thuận Nam commune
- Location within Vietnam
- Coordinates: 10°50′41″N 107°52′30″E
- Country: Vietnam
- Region: South Central Coast
- Province: Lâm Đồng
- Time zone: UTC+7 (UTC + 7)

Hàm Thuận Nam is a commune (xã) of Lâm Đồng Province, Vietnam. It is one of the 124 new wards, communes and special zones of the province following the reorganization in 2025.

On June 16, 2025, the Standing Committee of the National Assembly issued Resolution No. 1671/NQ-UBTVQH15 on the arrangement of commune-level administrative units in Lâm Đồng province in 2025. Accordingly, the entire natural area and population of Thuận Nam township and Hàm Minh commune (Hàm Thuận Nam district) were merged to form a new commune named Hàm Thuận Nam commune.
