= Mũi Né =

Mui Ne Phường Mũi Né
- Ward
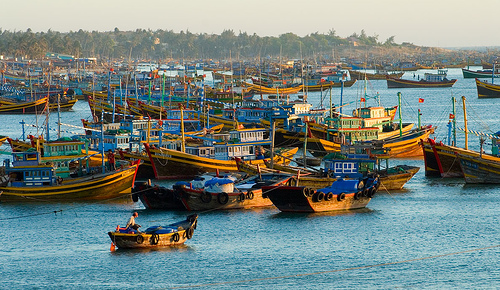
- Fishing boats in Mũi Né harbour
- Nickname: "The resort capital of Vietnam" "Thủ đô resort của Việt Nam"
- Location in Vietnam
- Coordinates: 10°56′N 108°17′E
- Country: Vietnam
- Province: Lâm Đồng (since 2025); Bình Thuận (formerly)

Population (2005)
  - Religions: Buddhism

Mũi Né is a coastal fishing ward in the Lâm Đồng Province of Vietnam. The ward has approximately 25,000 residents. Mui Ne and the other wards of Phan Thiet stretch along the coast for approximately 50 kilometers and have been transformed into a resort destination since the mid-1990s, when many visited the area to view the solar eclipse of October 24, 1995.

Mũi Né ward has two beaches; Ganh Beach and Suoi Nuoc Beach, both with a number of resorts and a few shops and restaurants. But the most highly developed area is Rang Beach in Ham Tien ward (often erroneously called "Mui Ne Beach" by foreigners), which extends west of Mui Ne.

The tourist season is from December to April. The average temperature is 27 °C, and the climate is hot and dry much of the year.

== Geography ==
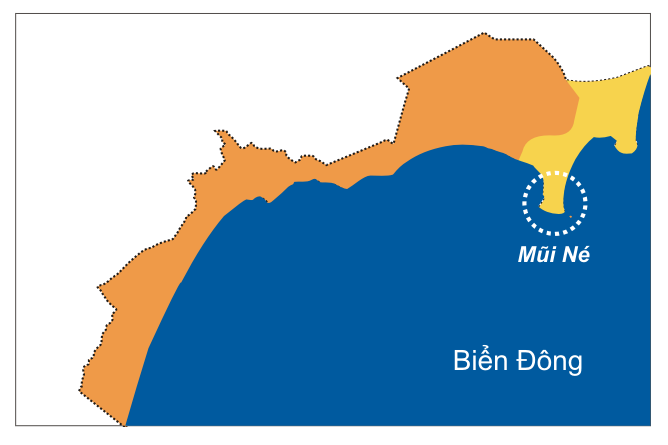
The image shows the boundaries of Mũi Né ward, with the northern headland pointing towards Hòn Rơm.

Mũi Né ward is geographically located as follows: - To the east and south, it borders the South China Sea. - To the west, it borders Hàm Tiến ward and Thiện Nghiệp commune. - To the north, it borders Thiện Nghiệp commune and Bắc Bình district.

The ward covers an area of 35.41 km², with a population of 24,275 as of 1999, resulting in a population density of 686 people per km².

== History ==
During the Republic of Vietnam era, Mũi Né was the district capital of Hải Long district, Bình Thuận province. After 1975, Hải Long district merged with Hàm Thuận and Thiện Giáo districts to form Hàm Thuận district, Thuận Hải province. At that time, Mũi Né was part of Hàm Dũng commune, Hàm Thuận district.

On March 13, 1979, the Government Council issued Decision 104-CP. According to this decision, Hàm Dũng commune was dissolved to establish Mũi Né town as the district capital of Hàm Thuận district.

On December 30, 1982, the Council of Ministers issued Decision 204-HĐBT. According to this decision, Hàm Thuận district was divided into two new districts: Hàm Thuận Bắc and Hàm Thuận Nam. At the same time, Mũi Né town was placed under the administration of Phan Thiết town and was renamed Mũi Né ward.

== Cuisine ==
Mui Ne is famous for seafood. Sand dunes are inhabited by the butterfly lizard, called nhông cát in Vietnamese. Local people cook lizard in seven ways: grilled, steamed, fried, roasted, raw, served in porridge, iguana pie, and served alongside vegetables. Therefore, the local people call this the seven dishes from iguana.

== Beaches ==
- Mui Ne Beach: The main stretch of coastline.
- Ham Tien Beach: A quieter beach with beachfront resorts.
- Hon Rom Beach: A secluded beach.

== Tourist attraction ==
Mũi Né is a coastal destination in Bình Thuận Province known for outdoor activities. Major attractions include the Red and White Sand Dunes, Fairy Stream, Mũi Né Beach. And Mũi Né Fishing Village, Mũi Né Market offer local culture and daily life.

== Gallery ==
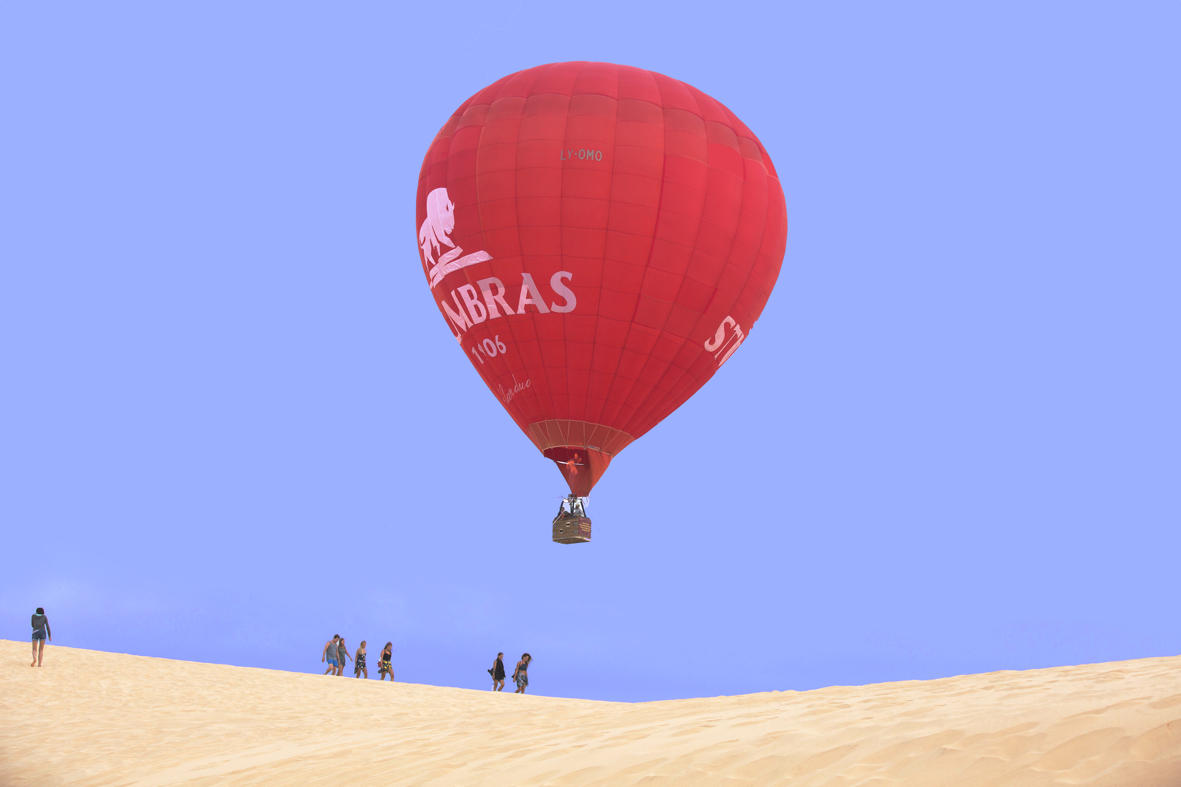
Hot Air Balloon over white sand dunes

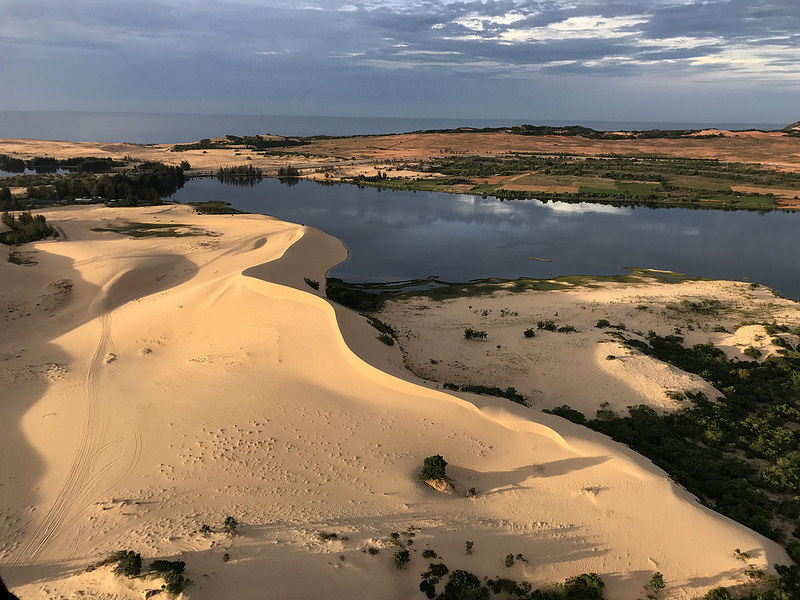
White sand dunes: view from hot air balloon

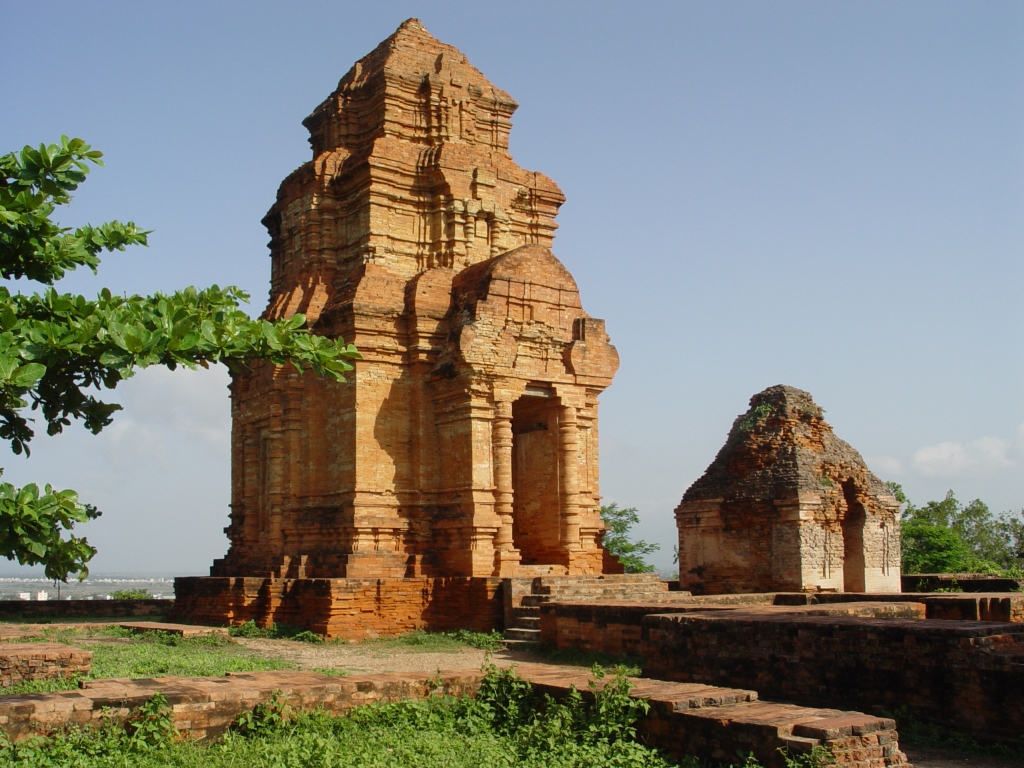
Cham Tower at Phu Hai

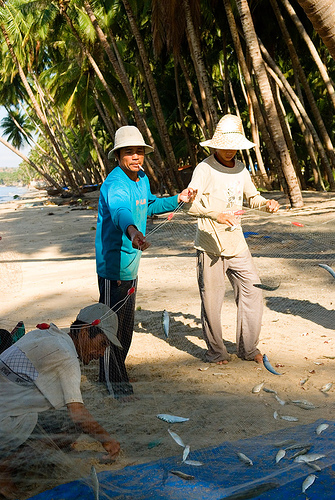
Local fishermen

Fisherman at Mũi Né Beach

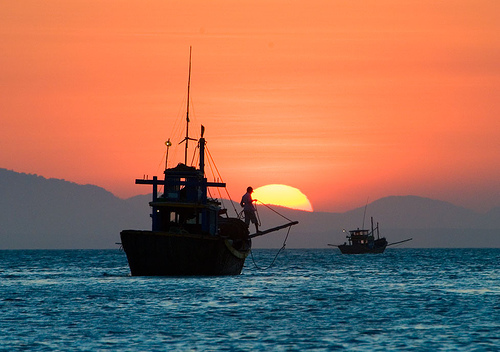
Fishing at dawn near Mũi Né

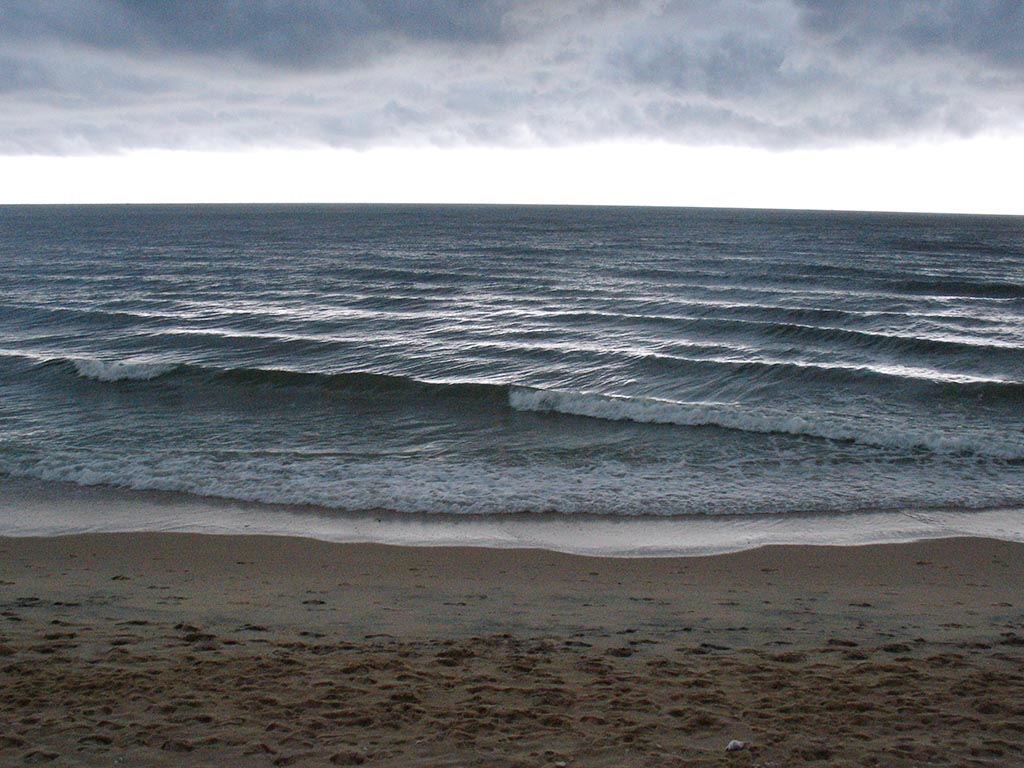
Before the storm

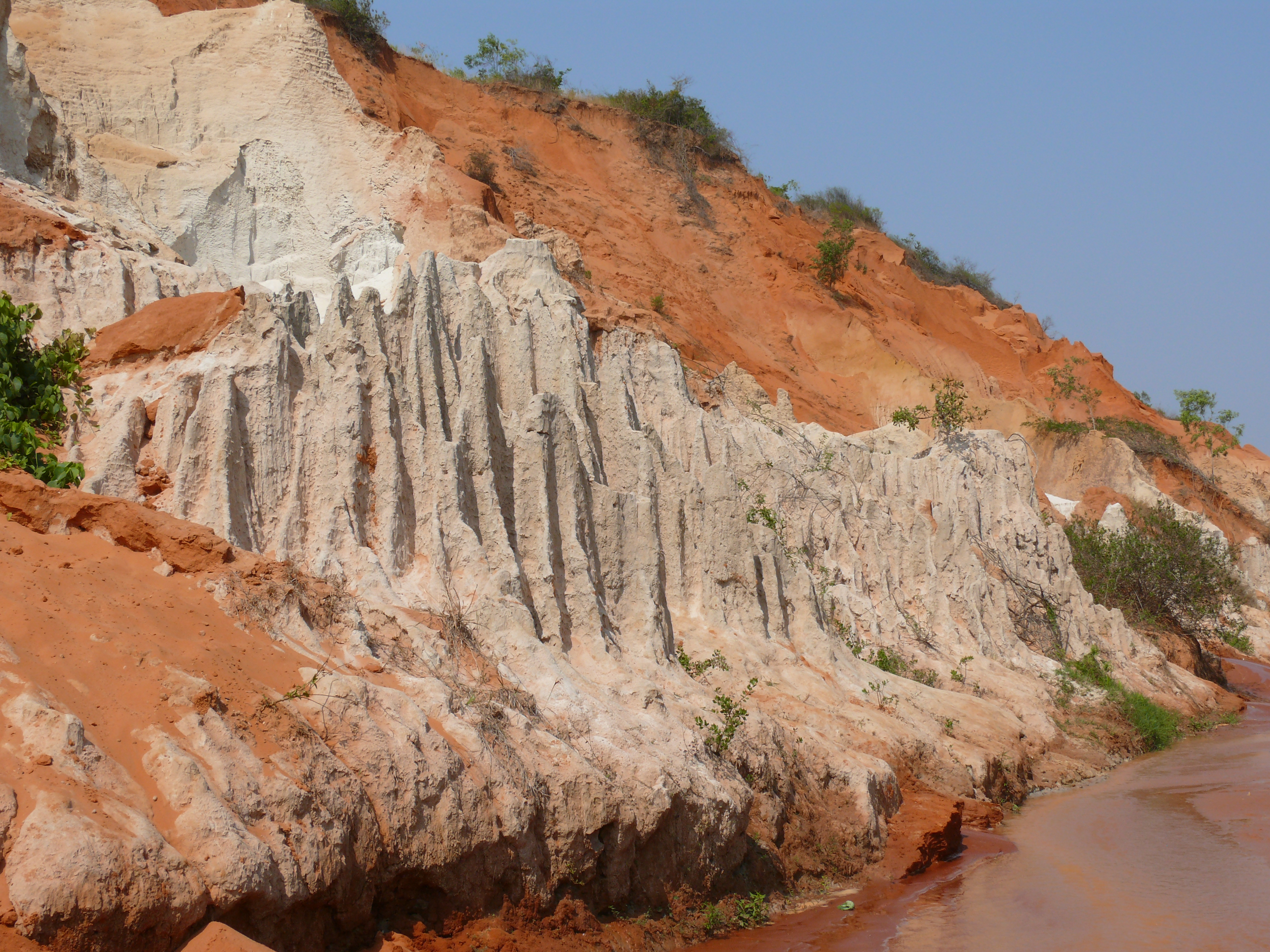
Mũi Né Fairy Stream

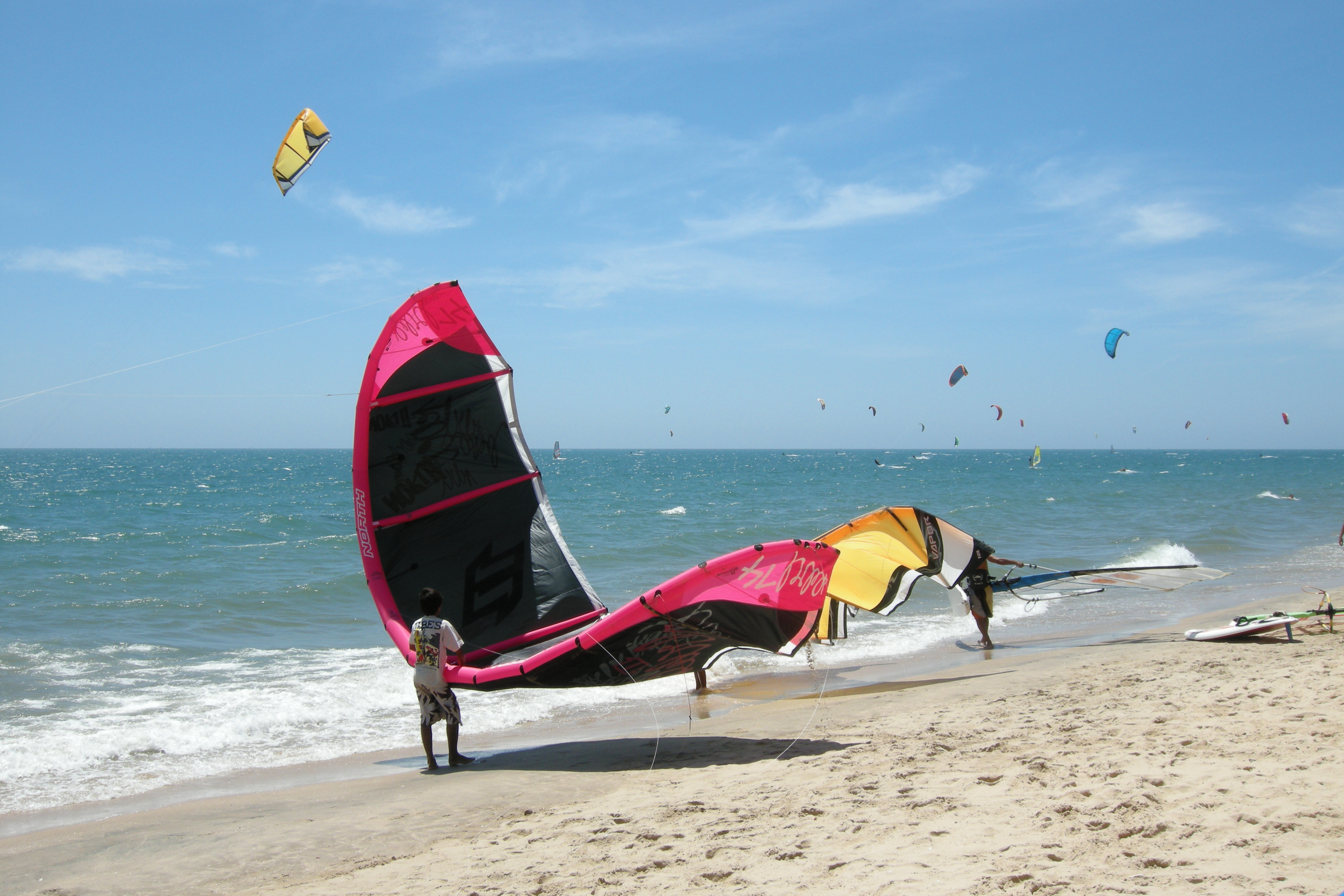
Kitesurfing on the beach

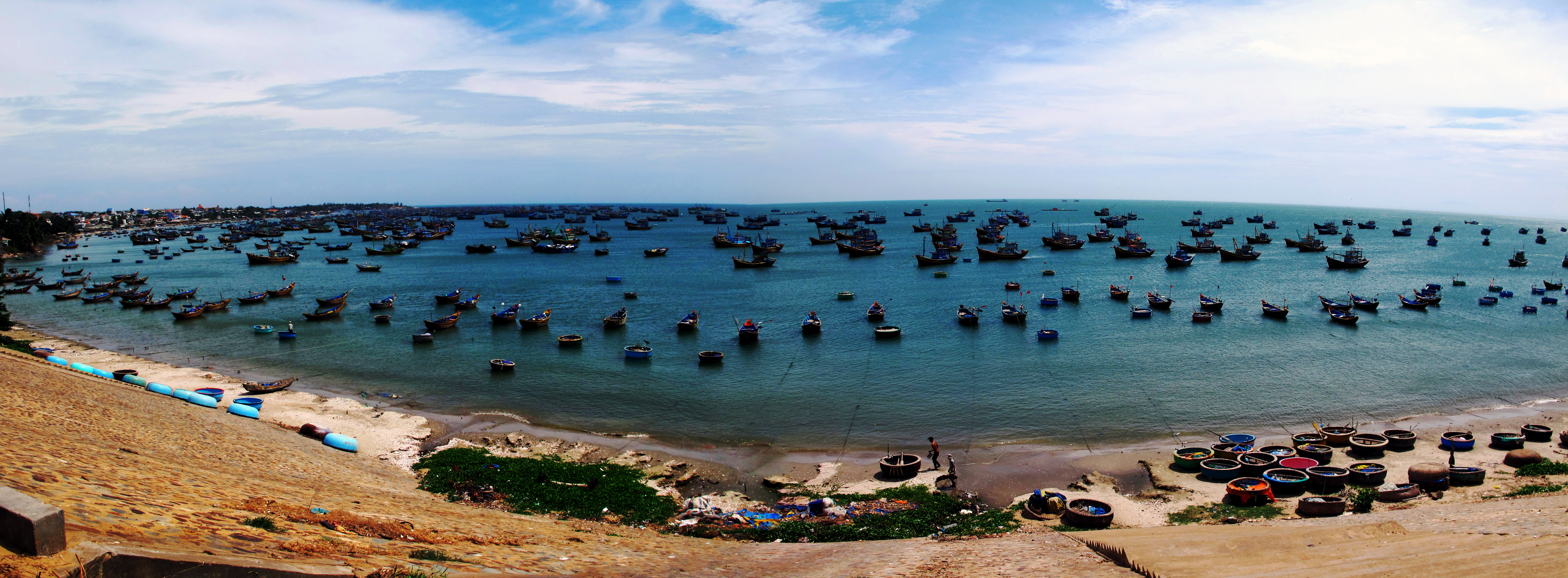
Mũi Né panorama

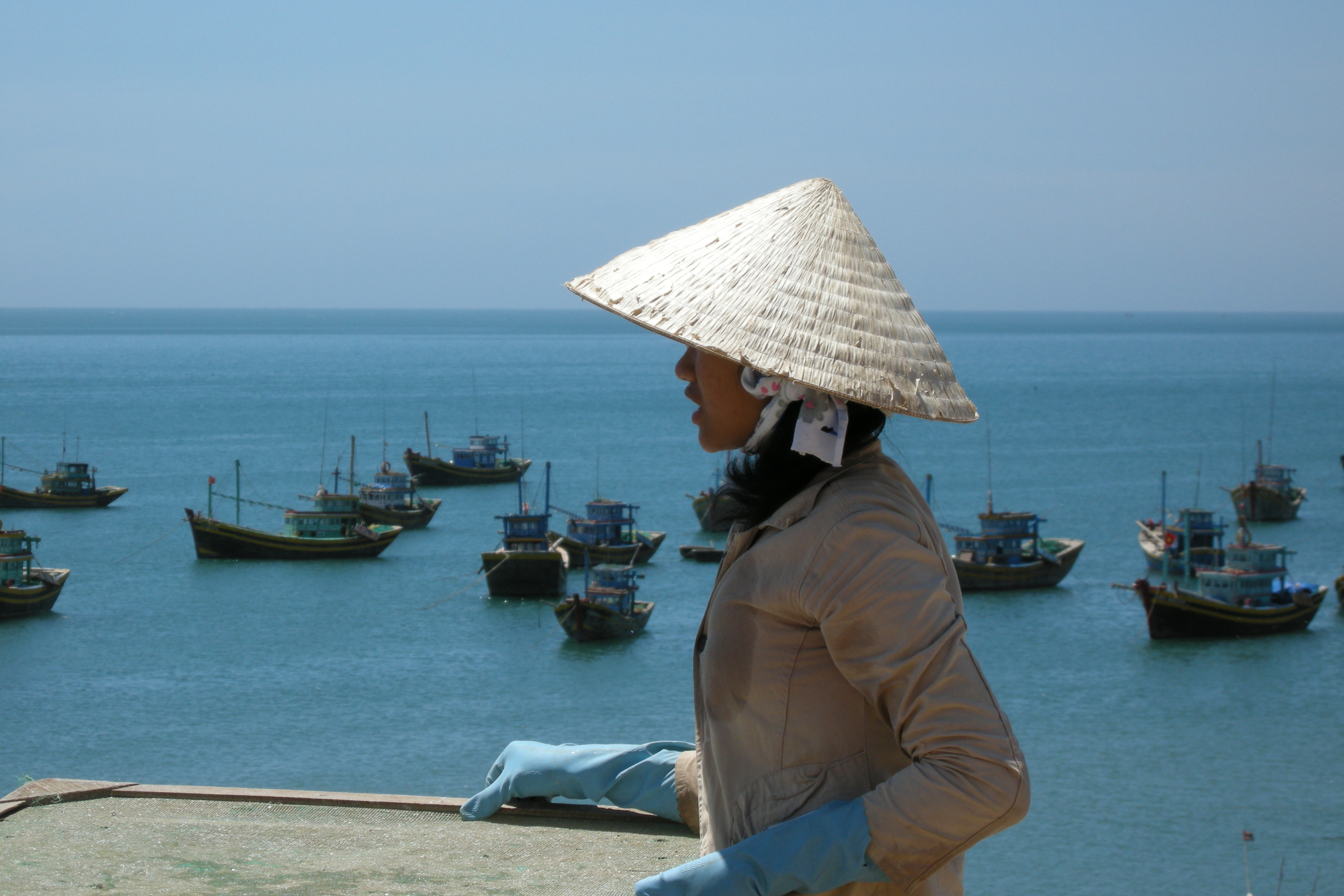
Harbour

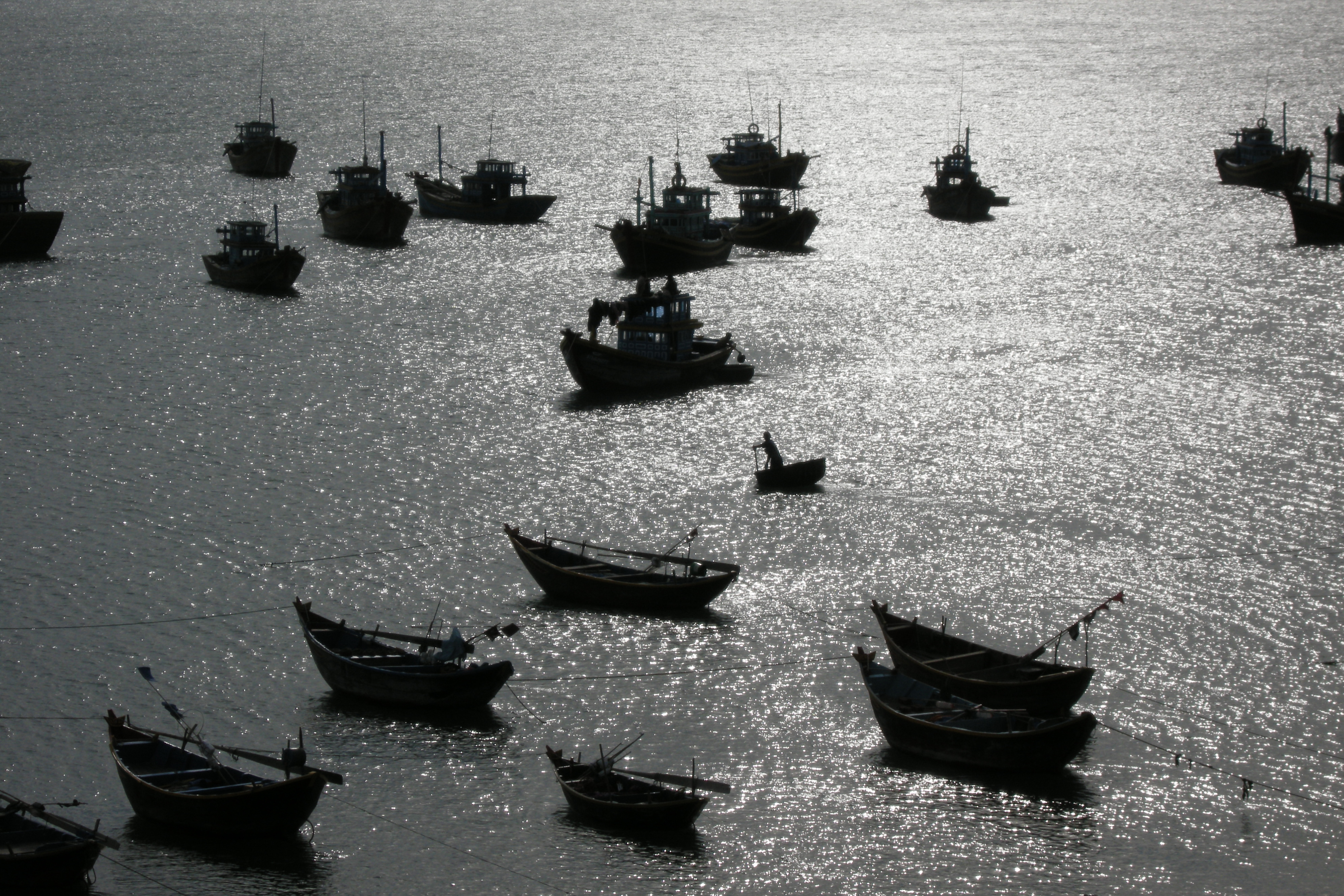
Fishing boats in harbour

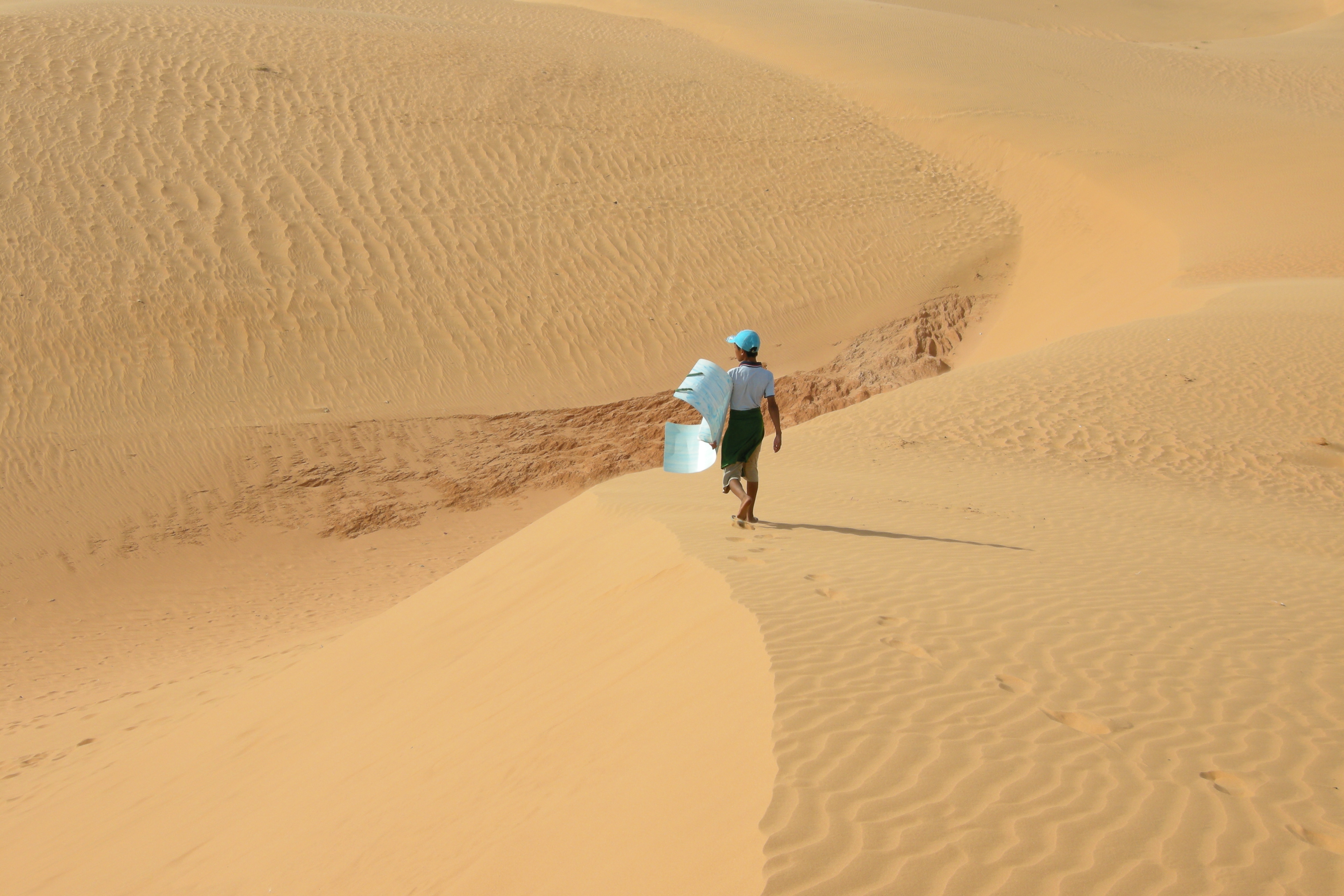
Sand dunes

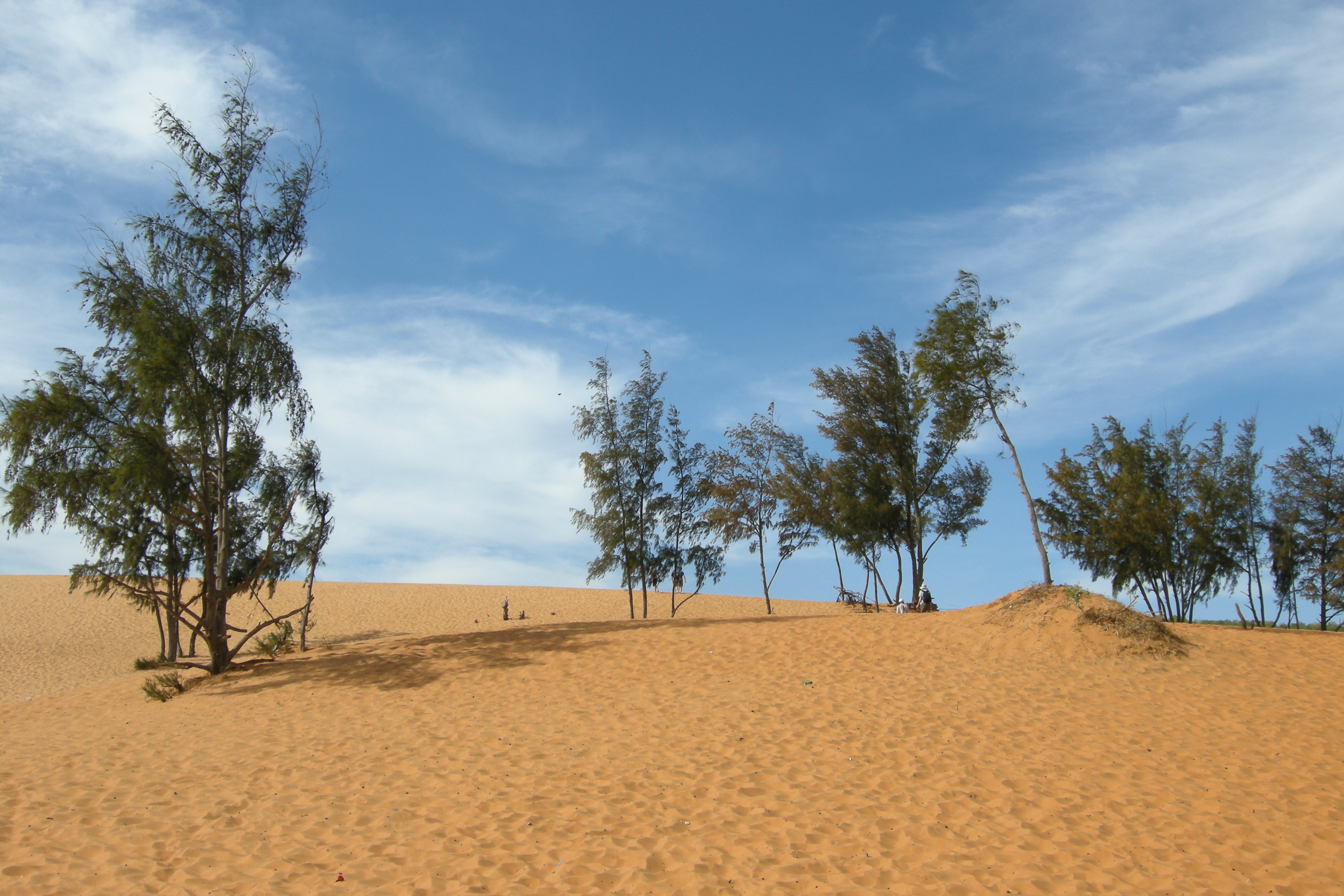
Sand dunes
