= Notre-Dame de Tà Pao =

Our Lady of Tà Pao Statue (Vietnamese: Tượng Đức Mẹ Tà Pao) is a statue located in Đồng Kho, Lâm Đồng, Vietnam. It is one of five statues of the Virgin Mary placed in Central, Southern and Central Highlands section of Vietnam in 1959 by former South Vietnamese president Ngô Đình Diệm. The statue is cast in white cement, 3m high, set on a square pedestal 2m high.
