= Hàm Tân district =

Coordinates: 10.750°N 107.667°E

Hàm Tân district Huyện Hàm Tân
- District
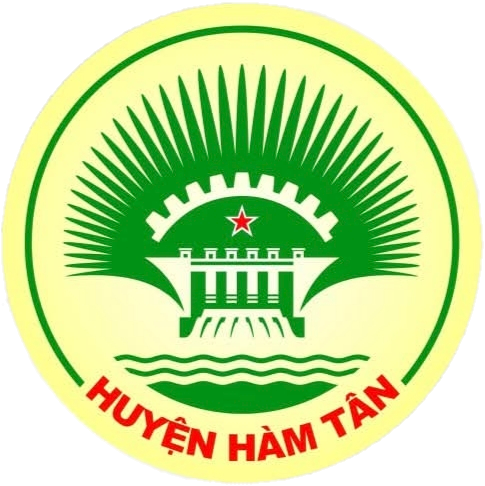
- Seal
- Interactive map of Hàm Tân district
- Country: Vietnam
- Region: Southeast
- Province: Bình Thuận
- Capital: Tân Nghĩa

Area
  - Total: 363 sq mi (941 km^{2})

Population (2003)
  - Total: 168,717
- Time zone: UTC+07:00 (Indochina Time)

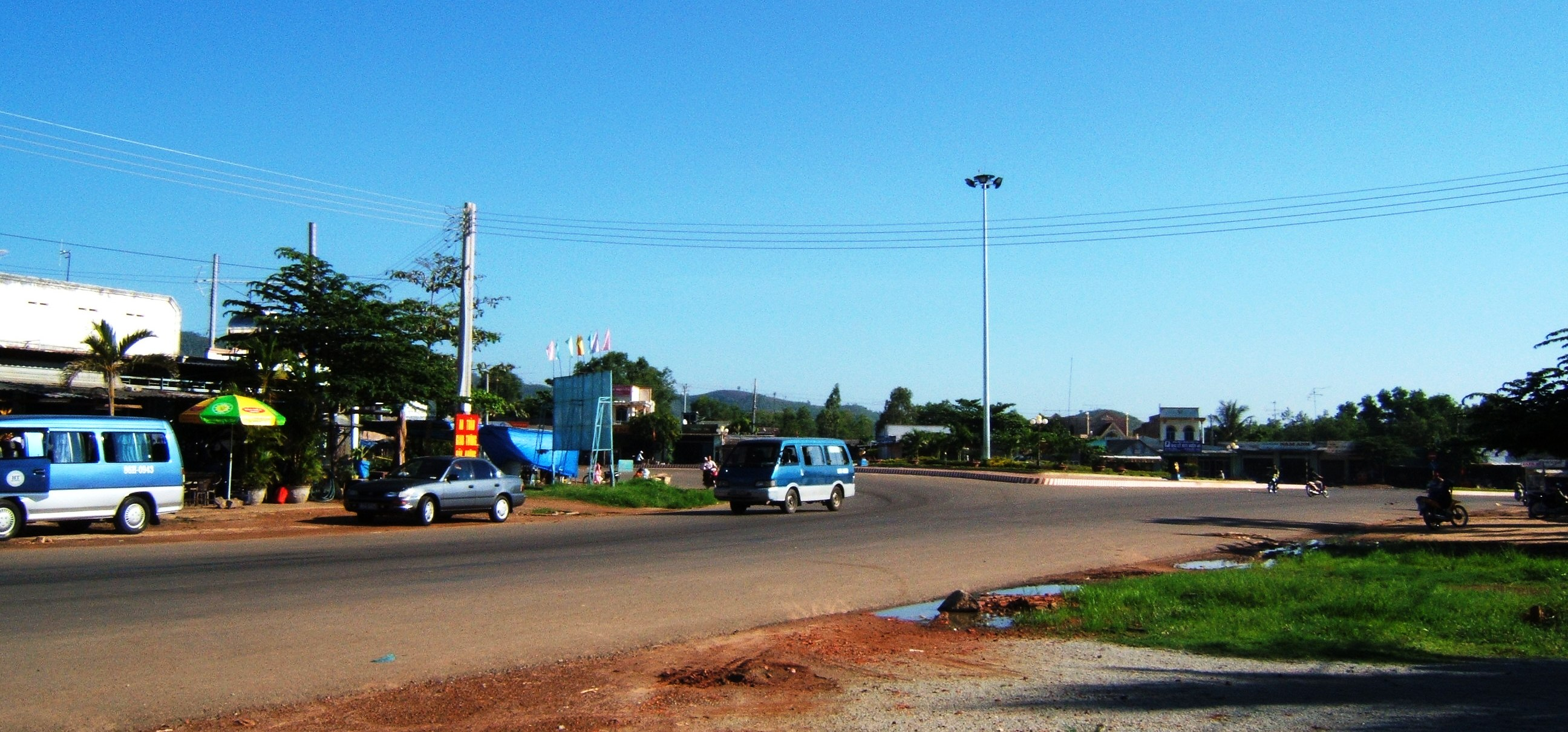
Road Junction to HW 1A, Tân Nghĩa, Hàm Tân district, towards La Gi

Hàm Tân is a former rural district of Bình Thuận province in the Southeast region of Vietnam. As of 2003 the district had a population of 168,717. The district covers an area of 941 km^{2} (363 sq mi). The district capital lies at Tân Nghĩa.

== Climate ==
Climate data for Hàm Tân
Month	Jan	Feb	Mar	Apr	May	Jun	Jul	Aug	Sep	Oct	Nov	Dec	Year
Mean daily maximum °C (°F)	29.5 (85.1)	30.0 (86.0)	30.9 (87.6)	32.0 (89.6)	32.2 (90.0)	31.3 (88.3)	30.9 (87.6)	30.9 (87.6)	30.7 (87.3)	30.5 (86.9)	30.4 (86.7)	29.8 (85.6)	30.8 (87.4)
Daily mean °C (°F)	24.9 (76.8)	25.5 (77.9)	26.8 (80.2)	28.2 (82.8)	28.3 (82.9)	27.2 (81.0)	26.9 (80.4)	26.8 (80.2)	26.6 (79.9)	26.6 (79.9)	26.3 (79.3)	25.4 (77.7)	26.6 (79.9)
Mean daily minimum °C (°F)	21.4 (70.5)	22.1 (71.8)	23.7 (74.7)	25.3 (77.5)	25.2 (77.4)	24.6 (76.3)	24.3 (75.7)	24.3 (75.7)	24.1 (75.4)	24.0 (75.2)	23.4 (74.1)	22.1 (71.8)	23.7 (74.7)
Average precipitation mm (inches)	2.1 (0.08)	0.3 (0.01)	8.1 (0.32)	42.1 (1.66)	190.9 (7.52)	265.1 (10.44)	292.8 (11.53)	292.2 (11.50)	258.9 (10.19)	203.4 (8.01)	48.1 (1.89)	24.2 (0.95)	1,623.2 (63.91)
Average rainy days	0.8	0.4	0.9	3.6	15.5	20.3	22.0	22.1	20.5	15.2	6.5	3.2	130.8
Average relative humidity (%)	77.2	76.9	77.8	78.6	81.7	84.7	85.7	86.1	86.5	85.3	81.3	78.6	81.7
Mean monthly sunshine hours	264.2	265.0	295.6	279.2	237.3	192.2	201.8	195.6	184.0	198.5	216.3	225.5	2,751.7
Source: Vietnam Institute for Building Science and Technology
