= Hàm Thuận Nam district =

Coordinates: 11.000°N 107.917°E

Hàm Thuận Nam district Huyện Hàm Thuận Nam
- District
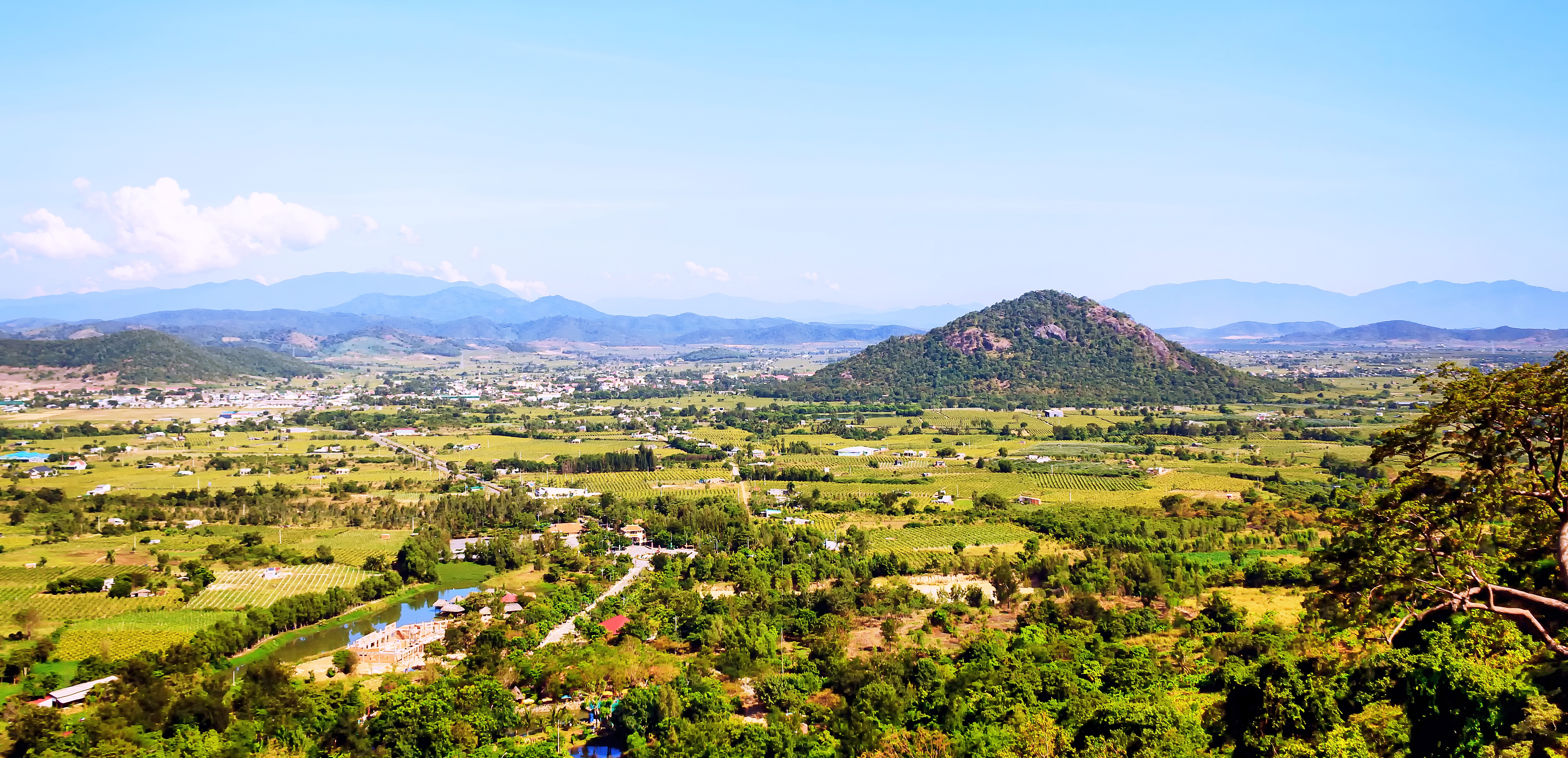
- View from above of the Hàm Thuận Nam landscape

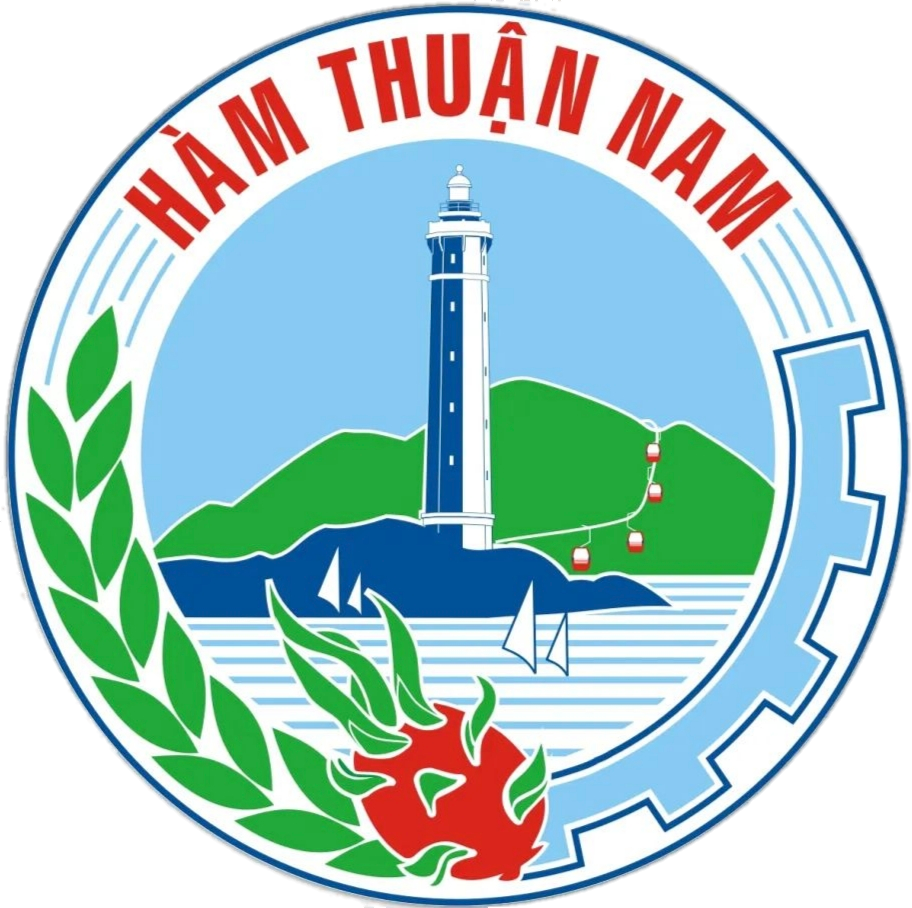
- Seal
- Interactive map of Hàm Thuận Nam district
- Country: Vietnam
- Region: Southeast
- Province: Bình Thuận
- Capital: Thuận Nam

Area
  - District: 406 sq mi (1,052 km^{2})

Population (2019)
  - District: 116,544
  - Density: 286.9/sq mi (110.8/km^{2})
  - Urban: 14,697
  - Rural: 101,847
- Time zone: UTC+07:00 (Indochina Time)

Hàm Thuận Nam is a former rural district of Bình Thuận province in the Southeast region of Vietnam.

As of 2019, the district had a population of 116,544. The district covers an area of 1,052 km^{2} (406 sq mi). The district capital lies at Thuận Nam.
