= Thanh Thủy =

Thanh Thủy in Vietnamese language can be:

== Place name ==
Thanh Thủy may refer to several places in Vietnam:

- Thanh Thủy district, a formerly rural district of Phú Thọ province.
- Thanh Thủy, Phú Thọ, a township and capital of Thanh Thủy district.
- Thanh Thủy, Thanh Hóa, a rural commune of Nghi Sơn district-level town

- Thanh Thủy, Hà Giang, a rural commune of Vị Xuyên district
- Thanh Thủy, Hà Nam, a rural commune of Thanh Liêm district
- Thanh Thủy, Hải Dương, a rural commune of Thanh Hà district
- Thanh Thủy, Nghệ An, a rural commune of Thanh Chương district
- Thanh Thủy, Quảng Bình, a rural commune of Lệ Thủy district

- Border gate Thanh Thủy, in Hà Giang province, trade between Vietnam and China
- Border gate Thanh Thủy, in Nghệ An province, trade between Vietnam and Laos

== Person ==
- Huỳnh Thanh Thủy (1963–), full name Huỳnh Thị Thanh Thủy, comedian
- Huỳnh Thị Thanh Thủy (2002–), Miss Vietnam 2022, Miss International 2024
- Phạm Thanh Thủy (1937–), full name Phạm Thanh Thủy, movie actor
- Mâu Thủy (1992–), full name Mâu Thị Thanh Thủy, Vietnam's Next Top Model season 4
- Trương Thanh Thủy (1985 – 2020), businesswoman
