= List of lighthouses in Vietnam =

This is a list of lighthouses in Vietnam, sorted by region.

== Lighthouses ==
=== Northwest Region (Tây Bắc Bộ) ===
Name	Image	Year built	Location & coordinates	Class of light	Focal height	NGA number	Admiralty number	Range nml
Bãi Cháy Lighthouse	Image	n/a	Hạ Long; 20°57′30.8″N 107°03′36.6″E	Fl R 2s.	17 metres (56 ft)	20224	F3296	n/a
Cẩm Phả Range Front Lighthouse		n/a	Cẩm Phả; 21°01′20.2″N 107°22′38.7″E	F R	8 metres (26 ft)	20214.6	F3313	3
Cẩm Phả Range Rear Lighthouse		n/a	Cẩm Phả; 21°01′41.3″N 107°22′46.2″E	F R	12 metres (39 ft)	20214.7	F3313.1	3
Cô Tô Lighthouse	Image	1961	Quảng Ninh province 20°59′57.8″N 107°45′26.9″E	Fl (2+1) W 12s.	116 metres (381 ft)	20213.8	F3314.8	15
Đảo Hạ Mai Lighthouse	Image	2005	Quảng Ninh province 20°43′06.7″N 107°27′16.6″E	Fl (3) W 10s.	181 metres (594 ft)	20215.5	F3306.5	12
Đảo Trần Lighthouse		1996	Quảng Ninh province 21°14′14.9″N 107°57′47.2″E	Fl (4) 15s.	201 metres (659 ft)	20213.5	F3314.5	28
Hòn Bài Lighthouse	Image	2000	Hạ Long; 20°44′15.4″N 107°10′44.0″E	Fl (3+1) W 16s.	45 metres (148 ft)	n/a	F3293.5	n/a
Le Cancrelat Lighthouse		1964	Quảng Ninh province 20°49′36.7″N 107°17′40.9″E	F W	47 metres (154 ft)	20214	F3306	20
Vĩnh Thực Lighthouse	Image	1962	Quảng Ninh province 21°23′46.5″N 108°0′08.9″E	Fl W 5s.	85 metres (279 ft)	20216.5	F3315	21

=== Red River Delta (Đồng Bằng Sông Hồng) ===
Name	Image	Year built	Location & coordinates	Class of light	Focal height	NGA number	Admiralty number	Range nml
Ba Lạt Lighthouse	Image	1962	Tiền Hải District; 20°15′23.9″N 106°35′46.8″E	Fl (3+1) W 20s.	37 metres (121 ft)	20272.5	F3233	18
Cửa Nam Triệu Bar Range Rear Lighthouse	Imahe	n/a	Hai Phong; 20°46′37.3″N 106°49′51.1″E	F W	21 metres (69 ft)	20252	F3268.1	n/a
Đảo Bạch Long Vĩ Lighthouse	Image	1995	Bạch Long Vĩ island 20°08′03.3″N 107°43′43.8″E	Fl (2) W 10s.	80 metres (260 ft)	20273	F3230	26
Diêm Điền Lighthouse	Image	1997	Thái Thủy; 20°33′35.4″N 106°34′39.6″E	Fl W 5s.	26 metres (85 ft)	20270	F3235	18
Đình Vũ Entrance North Side Lighthouse	Image	n/a	Haiphong; 20°50′54.7″N 106°45′45.8″E	Fl W 3s.	11 metres (36 ft)	20265	F3268	n/a
Đình Vũ Entrance South Side Lighthouse	Image	n/a	Haiphong; 20°50′47.1″N 106°45′48.8″E	Fl R 3s.	11 metres (36 ft)	20265.1	F3267	n/a
Hòn Dấu Lighthouse	Image	1894	Hòn Island; Hai Phong; 20°39′59.5″N 106°48′58.8″E	Fl (2) W 15s.	63 metres (207 ft)	20268	F3236	22
Lạch Giang Lighthouse	Image	2001	Nghĩa Hưng District; 19°59′11.9″N 106°10′52.8″E	Fl (2+1) W 10s.	21 metres (69 ft)	20279.9	F3228	14
Long Châu Lighthouse	Image	1894	Quần đảo Long Châu; Hai Phong; 20°37′23.5″N 107°09′33.6″E	Fl (3) W 20s.	110 metres (360 ft)	20216	F3232	27
Quất Lâm Lighthouse	Image	1966 est.	Giao Thủy District; 20°11′01.3″N 106°21′44.0″E	Fl W 4s.	26 metres (85 ft)	20278.8	F3229	15
Van Châu Lighthouse		1900	Thủy Nguyên District; 20°52′47.8″N 106°45′00.4″E	L Fl (3+1) WR 6s.	8 metres (26 ft)	20264.5	F3280.4	n/a

=== North Central Coast (Bắc Trung Bộ) ===
Name	Image	Year built	Location & coordinates	Class of light	Focal height	NGA number	Admiralty number	Range nml
Biển Sơn Lighthouse	Image	1962	Nghi Sơn; Thanh Hóa province 19°20′32.5″N 105°49′24.1″E	Fl W 5s.	31.5 metres (103 ft)	n/a	F3224	n/a
Chân Mây Lighthouse	Image	2001	Chân Mây Port; 16°20′17.9″N 108°01′02.0″E	Fl W 5s.	54 metres (177 ft)	20279	F3212	12
Cồn Cỏ Lighthouse	Image	n/a	Cồn Cỏ Island, Quảng Trị province 17°09′27.6″N 107°20′18.5″E	Fl (3) W 15s.	78 metres (256 ft)	n7a	F3218.25	n/a
Cửa Gianh Lighthouse	Image	1970	Thanh Trạch; 17°42′04.4″N 106°29′27.6″E	Fl W 16s.	20 metres (66 ft)	20276.5	F3218.5	15
Cửa HộI Lighthouse	Image	1966	Cửa Lò; 18°45′53.3″N 105°45′32.6″E	Fl (2+1) W 15s.	25 metres (82 ft)	20276	F3220	15
Cửa Nhượng Lighthouse	Image	1967	Cẩm Xuyên District; 18°15′56.5″N 106°07′20.9″E	Fl W 6s.	35 metres (115 ft)	20276.3	F3219.2	15
Cửa Sót Lighthouse	Image	1969 est.	Hà Tĩnh; 18°28′04.7″N 105°56′29.4″E	Fl (2) W 6s.	90 metres (300 ft)	n/a	F3219.3	19
Cửa Tùng Lighthouse	Image	n/a	Quảng Trị province 17°01′11.20″N 107°06′34.8″E	Fl (3+1) W 20s.	44 metres (144 ft)	20276.92	F3218	12
Cửa Việt Lighthouse	Image	1980	Triệu Phong District; 16°54′07.5″N 107°11′30.4″E	Fl (2) W 6s.	22 metres (72 ft)	20277	F3216	13
Hòn Mát Lighthouse	Image	2004	Nghệ An province 18°47′44.7″N 105°57′41.6″E	Fl (2+1) W 10s.	202 metres (663 ft)	20276.1	F3219.5	20
Hòn Mê Lighthouse	Image	1977	Thanh Hóa province 19°22′07.0″N 105°55′52.9″E	Fl (2+1) W 15s.	154 metres (505 ft)	20274	F3225	21
Lạch Trào Lighthouse	Image	1965	Sầm Sơn; 19°47′24.7″N 105°55′43.0″E	Fl (2) W 10s.	27 metres (89 ft)	n/a	F3227	n/a
Mũi Lay Lighthouse	Image	1976	Vĩnh Linh District; 17°05′02.5″N 107°06′50.9″E	Fl (2) W 10s.	37 metres (121 ft)	20276.9	F3218.2	18
Mũi Ròn Lighthouse	Image	1999	Kỳ Anh District; 18°07′08.1″N 106°25′50.3″E	Fl (4) W 20s.	205 metres (673 ft)	n/a	n/a	n/a
Nhật Lệ Lighthouse	Image	1974	Đồng Hới, Quảng Bình province 17°29′00.0″N 106°37′33.3″E	Fl (2+1) W 12s.	35 metres (115 ft)	n/a	F3218.3	n/a
Thuận An Lighthouse	Image	1979	Thừa Thiên-Huế province 16°34′11.8″N 107°37′42.1″E	Fl (3) W 10s.	37 metres (121 ft)	20278	F3213+	12

=== South Central Coast (Nam Trung Bộ) ===
Name	Image	Year built	Location & coordinates	Class of light	Focal height	NGA number	Admiralty number	Range nml
Ba Làng An Lighthouse	Image	1982	Quảng Ngãi province 15°14′30.3″N 108°56′24.0″E	Fl (2) W 6s.	36 metres (118 ft)	20321	F3181	12
Cù Lao Chàm Lighthouse	Image	2003	Cù Lao Chàm Island; 15°57′22.3″N 108°32′12.9″E	Fl (3+1) W 16s.	128 metres (420 ft)	20318	F3203.2	20
Cửa ĐạI Lighthouse	Image	2013	Quảng Nam province 15°52′35.9″N 108°23′22.1″E	Fl (3+1) W 15s.	25 metres (82 ft)	20316.5	F3203	12
Kỳ Hà Lighthouse	Image	1995	Núi Thành District; 15°28′55.6″N 108°41′29.1″E	Fl (2+1) W 12s.	25 metres (82 ft)	20317	F3202	15
Lý Sơn Lighthouse	Image	1900 est.	Lý Sơn District; 15°23′11.6″N 109°08′30.8″E	Fl W 5s.	50 metres (160 ft)	20320	F3184	15
Lý Sơn East Beakwater Lighthouse	Image	2000	Lý Sơn District; 15°22′48.4″N 109°08′46.8″E	Fl (3+1) W 15s.	11 metres (36 ft)	20320.2	F3184.2	12
Lý Sơn Harbor Lighthouse	Image	2000 est.	Lý Sơn District; 15°22′49.9″N 109°05′44.0″E	Fl (3) W 12s.	14.5 metres (48 ft)	n/a	F3184.5	n/a
Quản Tượng Lighthouse	Image	1093	Sơn Trà District; 16°07′20.6″N 108°12′50.1″E	Fl W 3s.	42 metres (138 ft)	20296	F3206	5
Sa Huỳnh Lighthouse	Image	2004	14°40′03.8″N 109°04′52.5″E	Fl (2) W 10s.	87 metres (285 ft)	20323	F3178	20
Sa Kỳ Lighthouse	Image	2000	Quảng Ngãi province 15°12′28.5″N 108°55′25.4″E	Fl (3) W 10s.	15 metres (49 ft)	20321.2	F3180	12
Sơn Chà Lighthouse	Image	n/a	Sơn Chà Island; Thừa Thiên-Huế province 16°13′00.4″N 108°10′20.4″E	Fl (2+1) W 6s.	238 metres (781 ft)	20279.5	F3211.5	12
Tân Hiệp Lighthouse	Image	2000	Cù Lao Chàm Island; 15°57′29.7″N 108°30′12.9″E	Fl W 5s.	42 metres (138 ft)	20318.1	F3203.3	12
Tiên Sa Lighthouse	Image	1903	Sơn Trà District; 16°08′22.7″N 108°19′19.7″E	Fl (2) W 10s.	158 metres (518 ft)	20292	F3204	23
Vạn Ca Lighthouse	Image	2000	Bình Sơn District; 15°25′26.0″N 108°47′55.0″E	Fl (3) W 10s.	33 metres (108 ft)	20319	F3200	12

=== South Central Coast (Duyên hải Nam Trung Bộ) ===
Name	Image	Year built	Location & coordinates	Class of light	Focal height	NGA number	Admiralty number	Range nml
An ThớI Lighthouse	Image	2000	Phú Quốc; 10°00′43.0″N 104°00′43.7″E	Fl (2) W 6s.	14 metres (46 ft)	20518	F3025	15
Aval Lighthouse	Image	1864	offshore Vũng Tàu; 10°24′05.2″N 107°00′50.4″E	Fl W 5s.	22 metres (72 ft)	20444	F3082	12
Ba Động Lighthouse	Image	n/a	Duyên Hải District; 9°41′10.1″N 106°34′33.8″E	Fl W 5s.	30 metres (98 ft)	n/a	F3058	n/a
Ba Kiềm Lighthouse	Image	2006	Xuyên Mộc District; 10°30′28.4″N 107°30′34.7″E	Fl (3) G 10s.	87 metres (285 ft)	n/a	F3115	20
Ba Ngòi Lighthouse	Image	2003	Cam Ranh; 11°52′52.0″N 109°12′14.4″E	Fl (3+1) W 7s.	89.5 metres (294 ft)	n/a	F3136	24
Ba Yen Range Front Lighthouse		n/a	Can Gio District; 10°28′43.8″N 106°56′09.4″E	Fl (2) W 6s.	9 metres (30 ft)	20448	F3084	5
Ba Yen Range Rear Lighthouse		n/a	Can Gio District; 10°28′56.6″N 106°56′03.7″E	Fl (2) W 6s.	12 metres (39 ft)	20452	F3084.1	6
Bồ Đề Lighthouse	Image	2001	Năm Căn district 8°45′24.2″N 105°13′21.7″E	Fl (4) W 12s.	20 metres (66 ft)	n/a	F3053	n/a
Cao Trang	Image	2007	Vũng Tàu; 10°21′24.7″N 107°03′37.3″E	Fl (3) G 10s.	20 metres (66 ft)	20428	F3070	6
Cù Lao Xanh Lighthouse	Image	1975	Cù Lao Xanh Island; Qui Nhơn; 13°36′52.4″N 109°21′27.9″E	Fl (3+1) W 12s.	118 metres (387 ft)	20364	F3158	27
Cửa Tiểu Lighthouse	Image	1898 est.	Tiền Giang province 10°12′33.2″N 106°50′09.5″E	Dir Fl (3+1) W10s.	22 metres (72 ft)	20472	F3060	n/a
Đà Rằng Lighthouse	Image	n/a	Tuy Hòa; 13°05′27.7″N 109°19′36.1″E	Fl (2) W 6s.	20.5 metres (67 ft)	n/a	F3155.8	13
Đá Trắng Lighthouse	Image	2001	Côn Sơn Island; 8°39′27.2″N 106°36′16.3″E	Fl W 5s.	17 metres (56 ft)	20486	F3049.5	12
Đại Lãnh Lighthouse	Image	n/a	Đông Hòa District; 12°53′47.7″N 109°27′25.6″E	Fl (3) W 15s.	110 metres (360 ft)	20368	F3154	16
Dương Đông Lighthouse	Image	1993	Phú Quốc; 10°13′02.2″N 103°57′23.3″E	Fl (3) W 10s.	15 metres (49 ft)	20516	F3022	15
Gành Đèn Lighthouse	Image	2002	Tuy An District; 13°21′50.4″N 109°17′38.2″E	Fl W 5s.	22.5 metres (74 ft)	n/a	F3156	17
Ghành Rái Lighthouse	Image	1911 est.	Vũng Tàu; 10°22′51.7″N 107°03′23.2″E	Fl (2) G 7s.	19 metres (62 ft)	20432	F3076	6
Hồ Tàu Lighthouse		n/a	Duyên Hải District; 9°31′51.9″N 106°22′36.6″E	Fl (2) W 7s.	22 metres (72 ft)	n/a	F3056	n/a
Hòn Bảy Cạnh Lighthouse	Image	1887	Bảy Cạnh Island; Bà Rịa–Vũng Tàu province 8°40′00.8″N 106°42′22.6″E	Fl (2) W 10s.	212 metres (696 ft)	20476	F3046	27
Hòn ChuốI Lighthouse	Image	n/a	Trần Văn Thời district 8°56′51.1″N 104°31′30.7″E	Fl (2) W 7s.	131 metres (430 ft)	20493	F3040	23
Hòn Chông Lighthouse	Image	2005	Kiên Lương District; 10°08′37.1″N 104°36′03.7″E	Fl (3+1) W 16s.	36.6 metres (120 ft)	n/a	F3033	16
Hòn Chút Lighthouse	Image	1988	Cam Ranh; 11°46′57.1″N 109°13′17.0″E	Fl W 5s.	59 metres (194 ft)	20384	F3134	10
Hòn Đỏ Lighthouse	Image	1997	Hòn Đỏ Island; Ninh Hòa; 12°28′53.2″N 109°21′34.6″E	Fl (2) W 10s.	81 metres (266 ft)	n/a	F3152	22
Hòn Hải Lighthouse	Image	2004	Hòn Hải Island; Bình Thuận province 9°58′26.5″N 109°05′03.8″E	Fl (2+1) W 10s.	122 metres (400 ft)	n/a	F3120.7	20
Hòn Khô Lighthouse		2000	offshore Kiên Giang province 9°17′50.1″N 103°27′02.2″E	Fl R 5s.	15 metres (49 ft)	n/a	F3039.7	n/a
Hòn Khoai Lighthouse	Image	1904	Hòn Khoai Island; Cà Mau province 8°25′46.4″N 104°49′56.0″E	Fl W 10s.	300 metres (980 ft)	20492	F3042	27
Hòn Lớn Lighthouse	Image	1890	Hòn Lớn Island; Nha Trang; 12°11′39.9″N 109°20′02.7″E	Fl (3) W 10s.	102 metres (335 ft)	20372	F3148	26
Hòn Nưa Lighthouse	Image	2002	Hòn Nưa Island; Vạn Ninh District; 12°49′41.2″N 109°23′35.6″E	Fl (4) W 15s.	87.5 metres (287 ft)	n/a	F3151	23.5
Hòn Nước Lighthouse	Image	1997	Phù Mỹ District; 14°14′56.2″N 109°11′33.0″E	Fl W 5s.	62.5 metres (205 ft)	n/a	n/a	n/a
Kê Gà Lighthouse		1900	Hòn Bà; 10°41′42.4″N 107°59′29.7″E	Fl (3+1) W 20s.	22 metres (72 ft)	20412	F3116	18
Mũi Chụt Lighthouse	Image	F W	Nha Trang; 12°12′38.5″N 109°12′59.3″E	Fl (2) W 7s.	42 metres (138 ft)	20376	F3150	9
Mũi Dinh Lighthouse	Image	1904	Ninh Phước District; 11°21′38.8″N 109°00′51.1″E	FL (2+1) W 20s.	186 metres (610 ft)	20404	F3122	26
Nam Du Lighthouse	Image	2001	Kiên Hải District; 9°40′43.7″N 104°21′11.4″E	Fl (3) W 10s.	195 metres (640 ft)	20494	F3039	25
Núi Nai Lightouse	Image	2000	Hà Tiên; 10°21′57.5″N 104°26′39.8″E	Fl (2) W 10s.	112 metres (367 ft)	20512	F3030	19
Ông Đốc Lighthouse	Image	n/a	Sông Đốc; 9°02′19.5″N 104°48′41.9″E	Fl (2+1) W 12s.	19 metres (62 ft)	n/a	F3041	13
Phan Rí Lighthouse	Image	2004	Tuy Phong District; 11°09′52.8″N 108°33′50.9″E	Fl (4) W 10s.	19 metres (62 ft)	n/a	F3121	13
Phan Thiết Lighthouse	Image	2000	Phan Thiết; 10°55′02.8″N 108°06′23.2″E	Fl (3) W 10s.	15 metres (49 ft)	20408	F3118	13
Phú Quý Lighthouse	Image	1997	Phú Quý; 10°32′19.7″N 108°55′41.8″E	Fl (2) W 15s.	124 metres (407 ft)	20406	F3120	32
Phước Mai Lighthouse	Image	1904	Qui Nhơn; 13°45′41.0″N 109°15′03.0″E	Fl (2+1) W 15s.	52 metres (171 ft)	20332	F3162	18
Rạch Giá Lighthouse	Image	1993	Rạch Giá; 10°00′29.5″N 105°04′35.5″E	Fl (2) W 8s.	17 metres (56 ft)	20504	F3036	3
Sông Sài Gòn Lighthouse	Image	n/a	Can Gio District; 10°23′35.6″N 106°49′56.2″E	green light	18 metres (59 ft)	n/a	n/a	n/a
Thổ Chu Lighthouse	Image	2000	Phú Quốc; 9°17′34.3″N 103°28′28.2″E	Fl (4) W 15s.	140 metres (460 ft)	20494.5	F3039.5	12
Triều Dương Lighthouse	Image	2001	Phú Quý; 10°29′59.5″N 108°57′11.4″E	Fl (3+1) W 12s.	11.5 metres (38 ft)	n/a	F3120.5	12
Vũng Tàu Lighthouse		1913	Xuyên Mộc District; 10°20′02.8″N 107°04′39.6″E	Fl (2) W 12s.	193 metres (633 ft)	20416	F3066	23

=== Spratly Islands (Quần đảo Trường Sa) ===
Name	Image	Year built	Location & coordinates	Class of light	Focal height	NGA number	Admiralty number	Range nml
An Bang Lighthouse		1938	Amboyna Cay; 7°53′30.9″N 112°55′17.7″E	Fl (2) W 10s.	22 metres (72 ft)	20290.8	F2825.18	15
Ba Kè Lighthouse	Image	1995	Bombay Castle (South China Sea); 7°49′09.8″N 110°30′03.4″E	Fl (3+1) W 12s.	22 metres (72 ft)	20290.6	F2825.19	12
Bãi Phúc Nguyên Lighthouse	Image	n/a	Prince Consort Bank; 7°48′48.0″N 109°56′54.0″E	Fl (2) W 8s.	22 metres (72 ft)	20291	F2825.195	12
Bãi Tư Chính A Lighthouse		n/a	Southwest of Prince Consort Bank; 7°33′00.0″N 109°42′00.0″E	Fl (2) W 13s.	22 metres (72 ft)	20291.4	F2825.192	12
Bãi Tư Chính B Lighthouse		n/a	Southwest of Prince Consort Bank; 7°33′12.0″N 109°48′00.0″E	Fl (3) W 8s.	22 metres (72 ft)	20291.6	F2825.193	12
Đá Đông Lighthouse	Image	2010	East London Reef; 8°50′24.4″N 112°35′40.0″E	n/a	15 metres (49 ft)	n/a	n/a	n/a
Đá Lát Lighthouse	Image	1994	Ladd Reef; 8°39′58.3″N 111°39′51.3″E	Fl W 5s.	40 metres (130 ft)	20290	F2825.1	15
Đá Tây Lighthouse	Image	1994	8°50′42.2″N 112°11′42.9″E	Fl (3) W 10s.	22 metres (72 ft)	20290.1	F2825.15	15
Đảo Dá Lớn Lighhtouse	Image	n/a	Discovery Great Reef; 10°01′20.7″N 113°51′17.2″E	n/a	~ 13 metres (43 ft)	n/a	n/a	n/a
Huyền Trân Lighthouse	Image	1994	Alexandra Bank; 8°01′12.6″N 110°37′51.2″E	Fl (2+1) W 10s.	23 metres (75 ft)	20290.4	F2825.186	12
Nam Yết Lighthouse	Image	2010	Namyit Island; 10°10′45.2″N 114°21′47.2″E	Fl (3) W 15s.	25 metres (82 ft)	n/a	F2823.4	n/a
Núi Le Lighthouse	Image	n/a	Cornwallis South Reef; 8°44′51.8″N 114°10′46.1″E	n/a	15 metres (49 ft)	n/a	n/a	n/a
Phan Vinh Lighthouse		2010	Pearson Reef; 8°58′32.6″N 113°42′34.2″E	n/a	~ 15 metres (49 ft)	n/a	n/a	n/a
Phúc Tần Lighthouse	Image	1997	Southwest Bank; 8°09′59.1″N 110°35′47.5″E	Fl W 5s.	23 metres (75 ft)	20290.2	F2825.197	12
Quế Đường Lighthouse		1994	Grainger Bank; 07°49′09.8″N 110°30′03.4″E	Fl (3) W 10s.	23 metres (75 ft)	20291.2	F2825.194	12
Sinh Tồn Lighthouse	Image	2010	Sin Cowe Island; 9°53′09.2″N 114°19′48.0″E	Fl (2+1) R 15s.	25 metres (82 ft)	n/a	F2823.2	n/a
Sơn Ca Lighthouse	Image	2009	Sand Cay; 10°22′26.3″N 114°28′53.1″E	Fl (2) W 10s.	28 metres (92 ft)	n/a	n/a	15
Song Tử Tây Lighthouse	Image	1993	Southwest Cay; 11°25′41.5″N 114°19′52.2″E	Fl W 15s.	36 metres (118 ft)	20289.2	F2824.5	21
Tiên Nữ Lighthouse	Image	2000	Dangerous Ground (South China Sea); 8°51′00.1″N 114°38′19.6″E	Fl (2+1) W 10s.	22 metres (72 ft)	n/a	F2825.06	15
Trường Sa Lớn Lighthouse		2009	Spratly Island; 8°38′47.2″N 111°55′08.9″E	Fl W 10s.	25 metres (82 ft)	n/a	F2825.08	18

== See also ==
- Lists of lighthouses and lightvessels
