= Phú Thủy (disambiguation) =

Phú Thủy may refer to:

- Phú Thủy a ward of Lâm Đồng province
- Phú Thủy, Quảng Bình, a former rural commune of Lệ Thủy district
