= Sơn Thủy =

Sơn Thủy may refer to several places in Vietnam, including:

- Sơn Thủy, Hòa Bình, a rural commune of Mai Châu District
- Sơn Thủy, Lào Cai, a rural commune of Văn Bàn District
- Sơn Thủy, Phú Thọ, a rural commune of Thanh Thủy District
- Sơn Thủy, Quảng Bình, a rural commune of Lệ Thủy District
- Sơn Thủy, Quảng Ngãi, a rural commune of Sơn Hà District
- Sơn Thủy, Thanh Hóa, a rural commune of Quan Sơn District
- Sơn Thủy, Thừa Thiên-Huế, a rural commune of A Lưới District
