= Hồng Thủy =

Hồng Thủy may refer to several places in Vietnam, including:

- Hồng Thủy, Quảng Bình, a rural commune of Lệ Thủy District.
- Hồng Thủy, Thừa Thiên-Huế, a rural commune of A Lưới District.
