= Lệ Thủy district =

Lệ Thủy District Huyện Lệ Thủy
- District
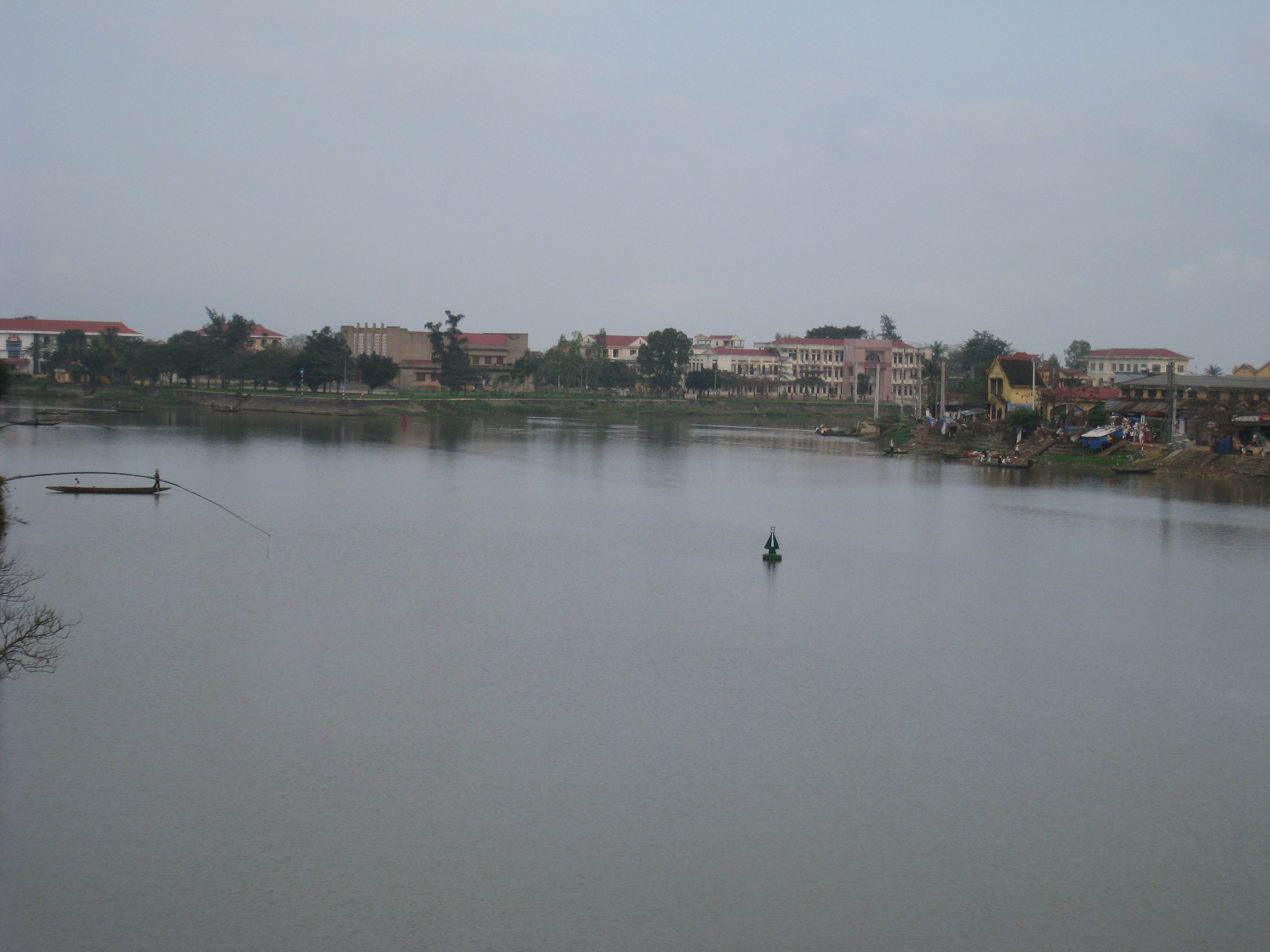
- Kiến Giang Town, the district seat of Lệ Thủy
- Interactive map of Lệ Thủy District
- Location of the district capital in Vietnam
- Coordinates: 17°13′N 106°48′E
- Country: Vietnam
- Region: North Central Coast
- Province: Quảng Bình
- Established: 1831
- Capital: Kiến Giang

Government
  - Chairman of the People's Committee: Đặng Đại Tình

Area
  - District: 548.47 sq mi (1,420.52 km^{2})

Population (2003)
  - District: 137.831
  - Urban: 11,238
- Time zone: UTC+07:00 (Indochina Time)
- Website: lethuy.quangbinh.gov.vn

Lệ Thủy is a former district of Quảng Bình province in the North Central Coast of Vietnam. The district borders Quảng Ninh district on the north, Vĩnh Linh district (Quảng Trị province) on the south, Laos on the west (with the Annamite Range as natural borderline). Lệ Thủy central is 40 km south of the provincial capital Đồng Hới. The district government seat is Kiến Giang Township. The district area is 1420.52 km^{2}, population: 140,804 (1998). Lệ Thủy district is home to Võ Nguyên Giáp and the family of Ngô Đình Diệm. Economy bases on agriculture, mainly rice culture. Mỹ Trạch massacre by French army happened here on 29 November 1947.

== Subdivisions ==
This district has two townlets and 25 communes (xã)

- Two townlets: Kiến Giang and Nông Trường Lệ Ninh.
- 26 communes:

Hồng Thủy, Ngư Thủy Bắc, Ngư Thủy, Thanh Thủy, Lộc Thủy, Hoa Thủy, Cam Thủy, Liên Thủy, Phong Thủy, An Thủy, Sơn Thủy, Ngân Thủy, Hải Thủy, Hưng Thủy, Tân Thủy, Xuân Thủy, Dương Thủy, Mai Thủy, Phú Thủy, Mỹ Thủy, Sen Thủy, Trường Thủy, Văn Thủy, Kim Thủy, Thái Thủy.

| Communes | Area (km^{2}) | Population (2009) | Density (inhabitants/km^{2}) |
|---|---|---|---|
| Kiến Giang | 3.14 | 6,341 | 2019.4 |
| Lệ Ninh | 11.35 | 4,836 | 426 |
| An Thủy | 22.76 | 9,610 | 433.66 |
| Cam Thủy | 13.80 | 3,684 | 266.95 |
| Dương Thủy | 9.3 | 4,146 | 445.8 |
| Hoa Thủy | 17.25 | 7,273 | 421.6 |
| Hồng Thủy | 29.5 | 8,191 | 380.97 |
| Hưng Thủy | 21.7 | 6,138 | 282.8 |
| Kim Thủy | 484.75 | 3,309 | 6.82 |
| Lâm Thủy | 242.97 | 1,260 | 5.18 |
| Liên Thủy | 6.98 | 8,083 | 160.59 |
| Lộc Thủy | 7.75 | 4,155 | 536.1 |
| Mai Thủy | 19.77 | 6,060 | 306.5 |
| Mỹ Thủy | 13.64 | 5,011 | 367.37 |
| Phong Thuỷ | 9.96 | 7,016 | 704.4 |
| Phú Thủy | 45.66 | 6,748 | 147.78 |
| Sen Thủy | 75.2 | 5,409 | 71.9 |
| Sơn Thủy | 25.88 | 7,184 | 277.5 |
| Ngân Thủy | 167.71 | 1,742 | 10.38 |
| Ngư Thủy Bắc | 31.38 | 3,584 | 114.2 |
| Ngư Thủy Nam | 9.7 | 2,831 | 311 |
| Ngư Thủy Trung | 13.4 | 2,152 | 160.59 |
| Tân Thủy | 19.91 | 5,942 | 298.4 |
| Thanh Thủy | 14.2 | 5,380 | 378.87 |
| Thái Thủy | 55.3 | 4,570 | 82.6 |
| Trường Thủy | 20.75 | 1,579 | 76 |
| Văn Thủy | 15.1 | 2,698 | 178.67 |
| Xuân Thủy | 6.8 | 5,241 | 770.73 |

== Geography ==
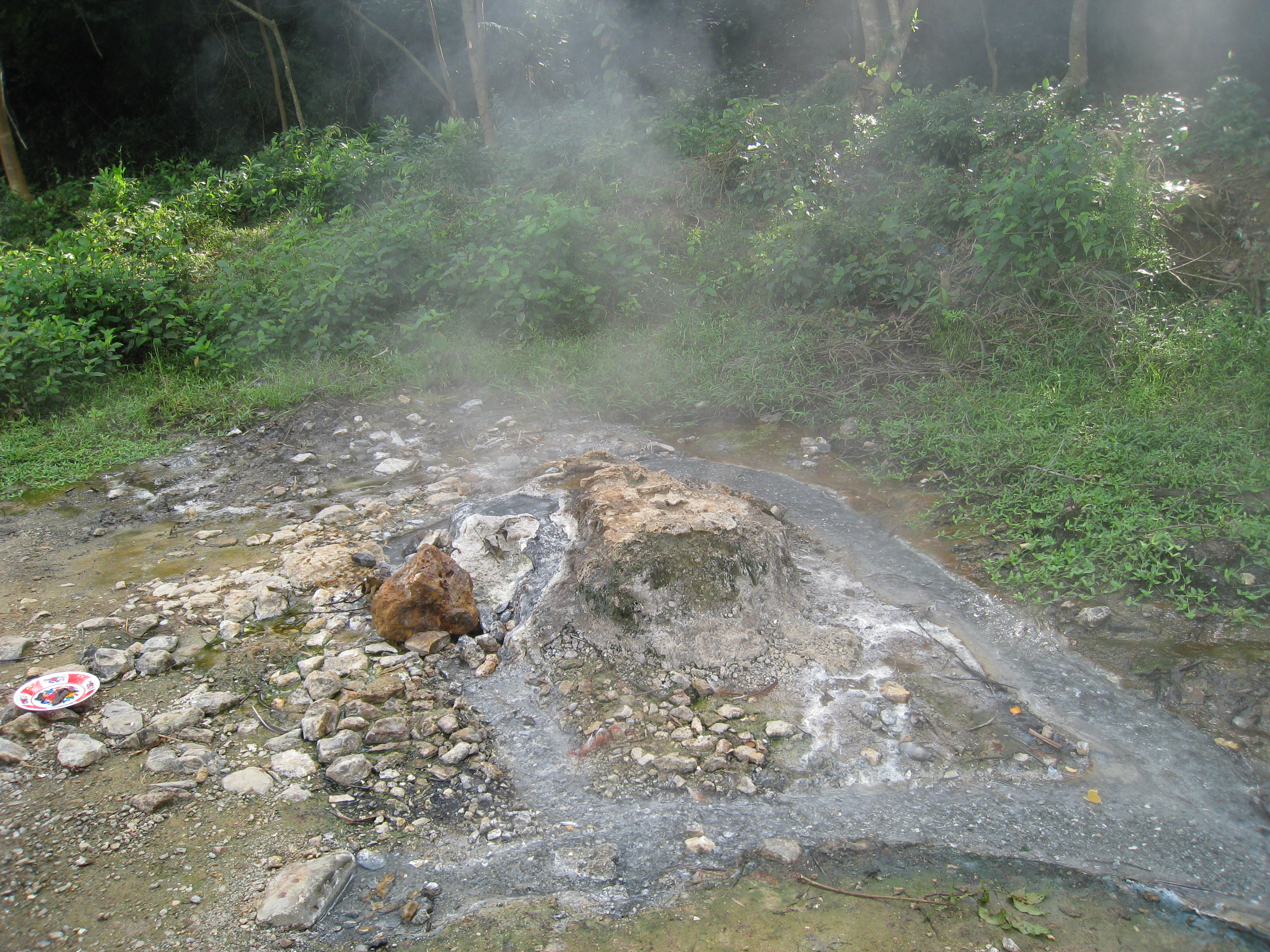
Bang Spa in Lệ Thủy

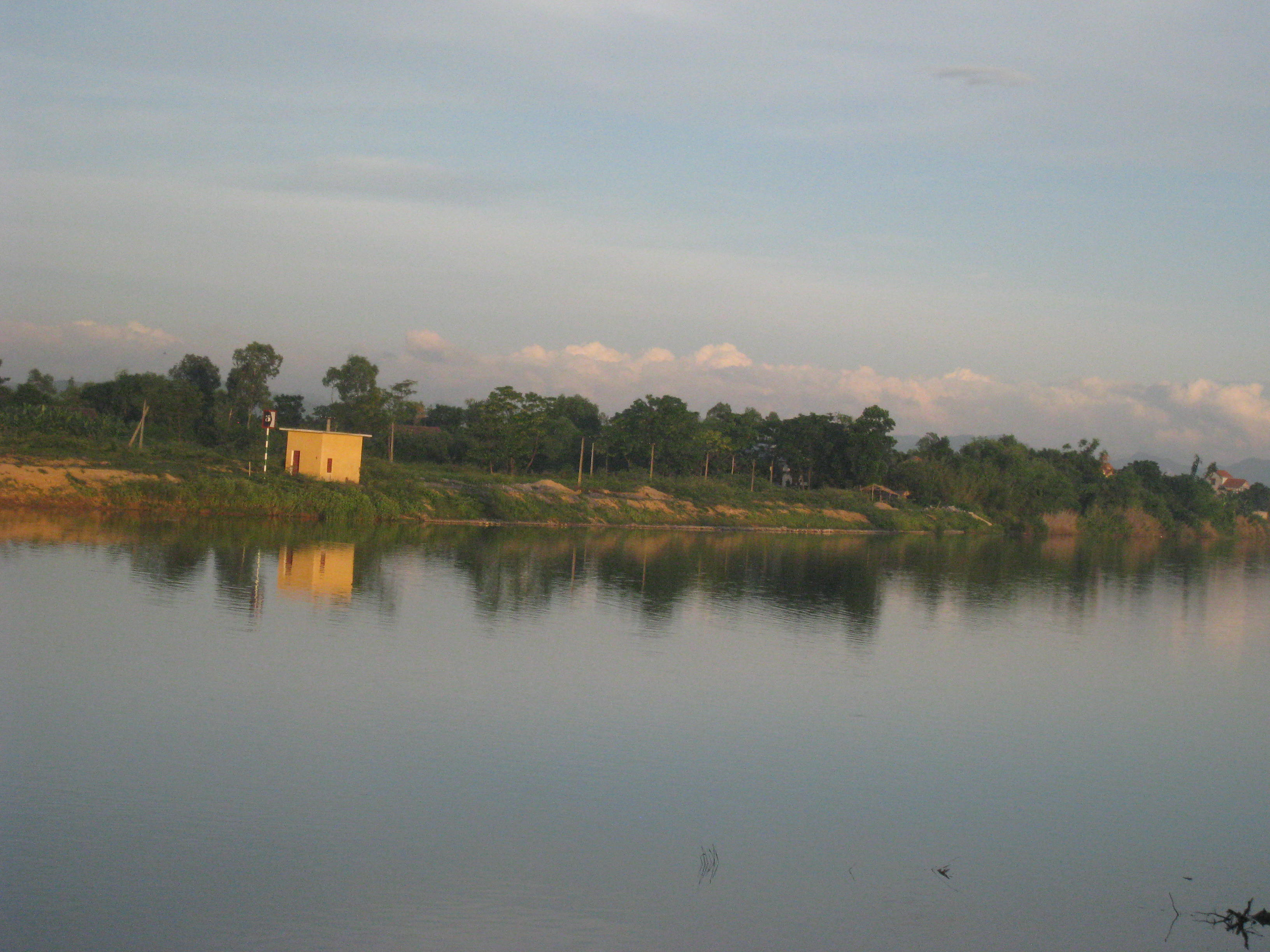
Kiến Giang River in Lệ Thủy

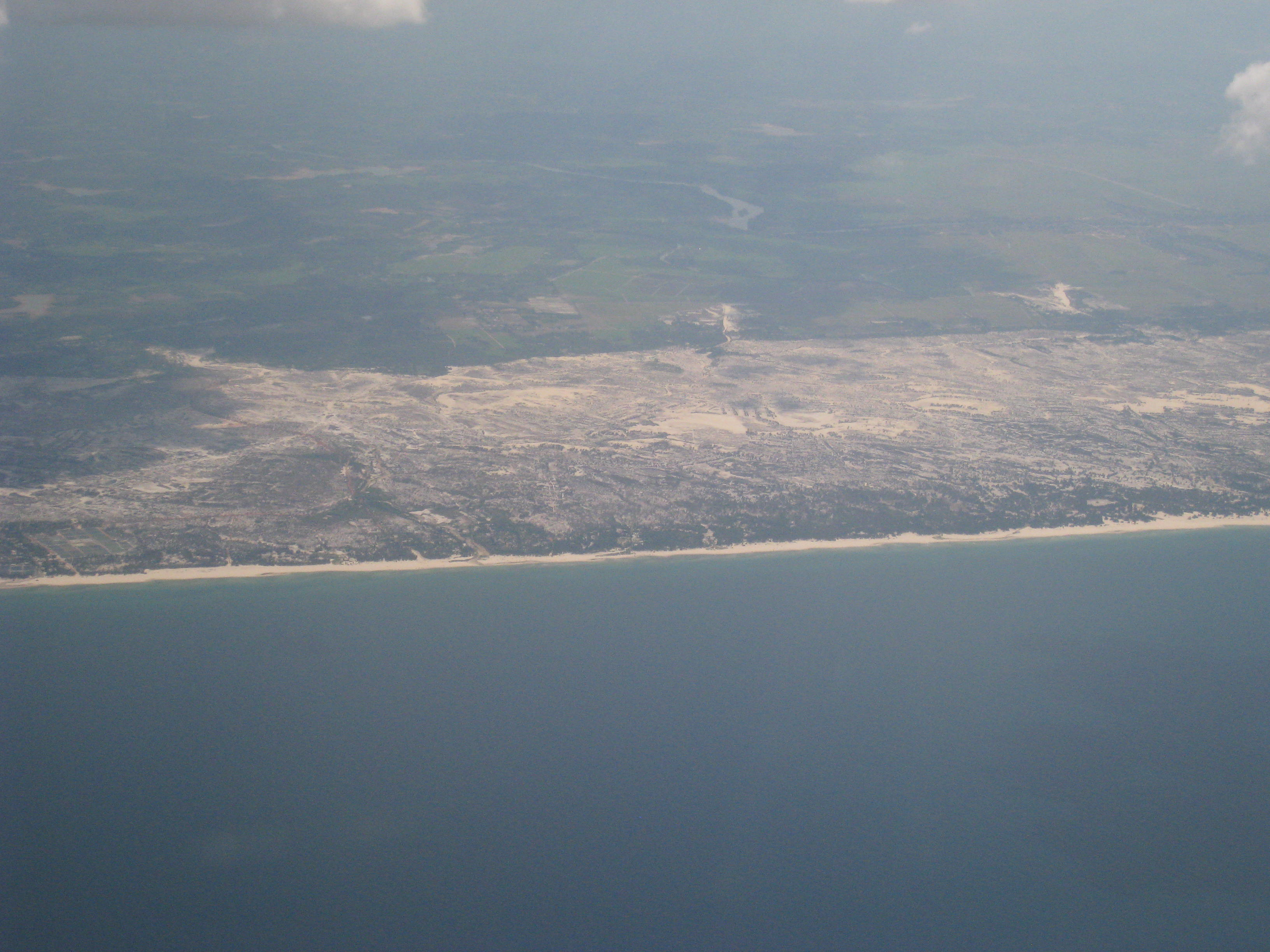
The seaside with sand dunes in Lệ Thủy

The western portion of the district is characterized by the Annamite Range, where the Ho Chi Minh trail ran through in Vietnam War. The area slope is lower towards the east to the narrow plain of Kiến Giang River. The east side is the coastline with a range of sand dunes (with the width of around 10 km). The seasides here are wild and clean with several fishing villages. The district is home to Bang Spa, a mineral hot spring and is also a regular tourist destination.

== Economy ==
The district's economy is largely based on agriculture and forestry. The district has two townships: Kiến Giang Township and Nông Trường Lệ Ninh. There are some fine sand beaches along the South China Sea coast and a hot mineral spring in the west of this district but they are mainly visited by local inhabitants only.

== Transportation ==
The National Route 1, Ho Chi Minh Highway, and Hanoi-Saigon Railway run through the district.

== Famous residents ==
- Ngô Đình Diệm - the first president of South Vietnam.
- Ngô Đình Khả - Ngô Đình Diệm's father.
- Võ Nguyên Giáp - a general of Vietnam People's Army.
- Dương Văn An - a mandarin, historian in the Nguyễn dynasty.
- Nguyễn Hữu Cảnh - a mandarin of Nguyễn lords who established Vietnam's sovereignty in Saigon.
- Lâm Thị Mỹ Dạ - poet.
- Hoàng Kế Viêm - a mandarin of the Nguyễn dynasty

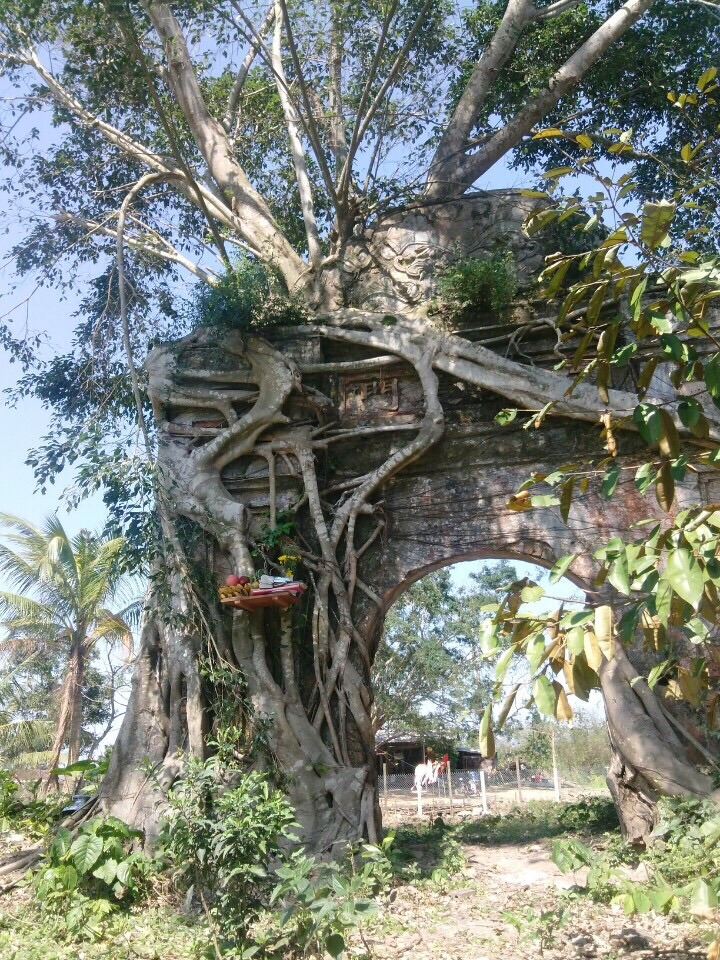
Hoang Phuc Pagoda in My Thuy, Le Thuy

== Culture ==
This district is home to Hò khoan Lệ Thủy.

== Former location name before 1945 ==
=== Thủy Liên Canton (Tổng Thủy Liên) ===
- Đặng Lộc xã
- Phò Chánh xã (Cung)
- Thủy Liên thôn (Quán Sen)
- Hòa Luật Đông (Hòa Đông)
- Thủy Liên Nam (Quán Trảy)
- Hòa Luật Bắc (Hòa Bắc)
- Trung Luật Thôn (Cây Cúp)
- Thử Luật Tây
- Hòa Luật Nam (Ngoại Hải)
- Liêm Luật xã
- Trung Luật xã
- Thương Luật xã
- Thủy Liên Đông (Quán Cát)
- Phò Thiết ấp (Hủ Thiết)
- Thủy Liên Hạ (Quán Bụt)

=== Mỹ Trạch Canton ===
- Cổ Liễu xã (Tréo)
- Liêm Thiện xã (Làng Liêm)
- Mỹ Thổ xã (Làng Ngói)
- Luật Sơn ấp
- Quy Hậu xã
- Dương Xá xã (Làng Dương)
- Mỹ Trạch Thượng
- Mỹ Trạch Hạ
- Tâm Duyệt xã
- Uẩn Áo xã (Nha Ngo)
- Thuận Trạch phường (Trạm)
- Tân Hậu phường
- Mỹ Son ấp (Thượng Lâm)
- Dương Xuân xã (Ba Canh)
- Tân Mỹ phường (Mỹ Lê)
- Tiểu Giang phường (Phường Tiểu)

=== Phong Lộc Canton ===
- Đại Phong Lộc xã (đợi)
- Mỹ Phước Thôn (Nhà Cồn)
- Tuy Lộc xã (Tuy)
- An Lạc phường
- An Xá xã (Thá)
- An Xá Hạ

=== Thạch Xá Canton ===
- Tân Việt phường
- Binh Phú ấp

=== Thượng Phong Lộc Canton ===
- Xuân Hồi xã (Hồi)
- Phú Thọ xã (Nhà Ngô)
- Thượng Phong Lộc xã (Làng Tiểu)

=== Xuân Lai Canton ===
- Xuân Lai xã
- Xuân Bồ xã
- Hoàng Giang xã (Nhà Vàng)
- Phan Xá xã (Nhà Phan)
- Quảng Cư xã (Làng Chềng)
- Lệ Xã xã (Kẻ Lê)
- Thái Xá xã (Nhà Cai)
- Thạch Bàn Thượng (Chợ Thẹc)
- Mai Xá Thượng
- Mai Xá Hạ (Nhà Mòi)
- Châu Xả Xã (Kẻ Châu)
- Phú Bình Phong

=== Mỹ Lộc Canton ===
- Mỹ Lộc xã (Mỹ Lược)
- Quy Trình xã
- Văn Xá xã
- Phú Hòa xã
- Lương Thiện xã
- Phu Gia xã
- Lộc An xã
- Phú Kỳ xã
