= Tân Thủy (disambiguation) =

Tân Thủy may refer to several places in Vietnam:

- Tân Thủy, a rural commune of Vĩnh Long province
- Tân Thủy, Quảng Bình, a former rural commune of Lệ Thủy district
