= Cam Thủy =

Cam Thủy may refer to several places in Vietnam, including:

- Cam Thủy, Quảng Bình, a rural commune of Lệ Thủy District.
- Cam Thủy, Quảng Trị, a rural commune of Cam Lộ District.
