= Tân Mỹ =

Tân Mỹ may refer to:

- Tân Mỹ, Ho Chi Minh City, Vietnam
- Tân Mỹ, Quảng Trị, Vietnam
- Tân Mỹ, An Giang, Vietnam
- Tân Mỹ, Bắc Giang, Vietnam
