= Nguyễn Hữu Cảnh =

Vietnamese military general

Marquess Lễ Thành Nguyễn Hữu Cảnh
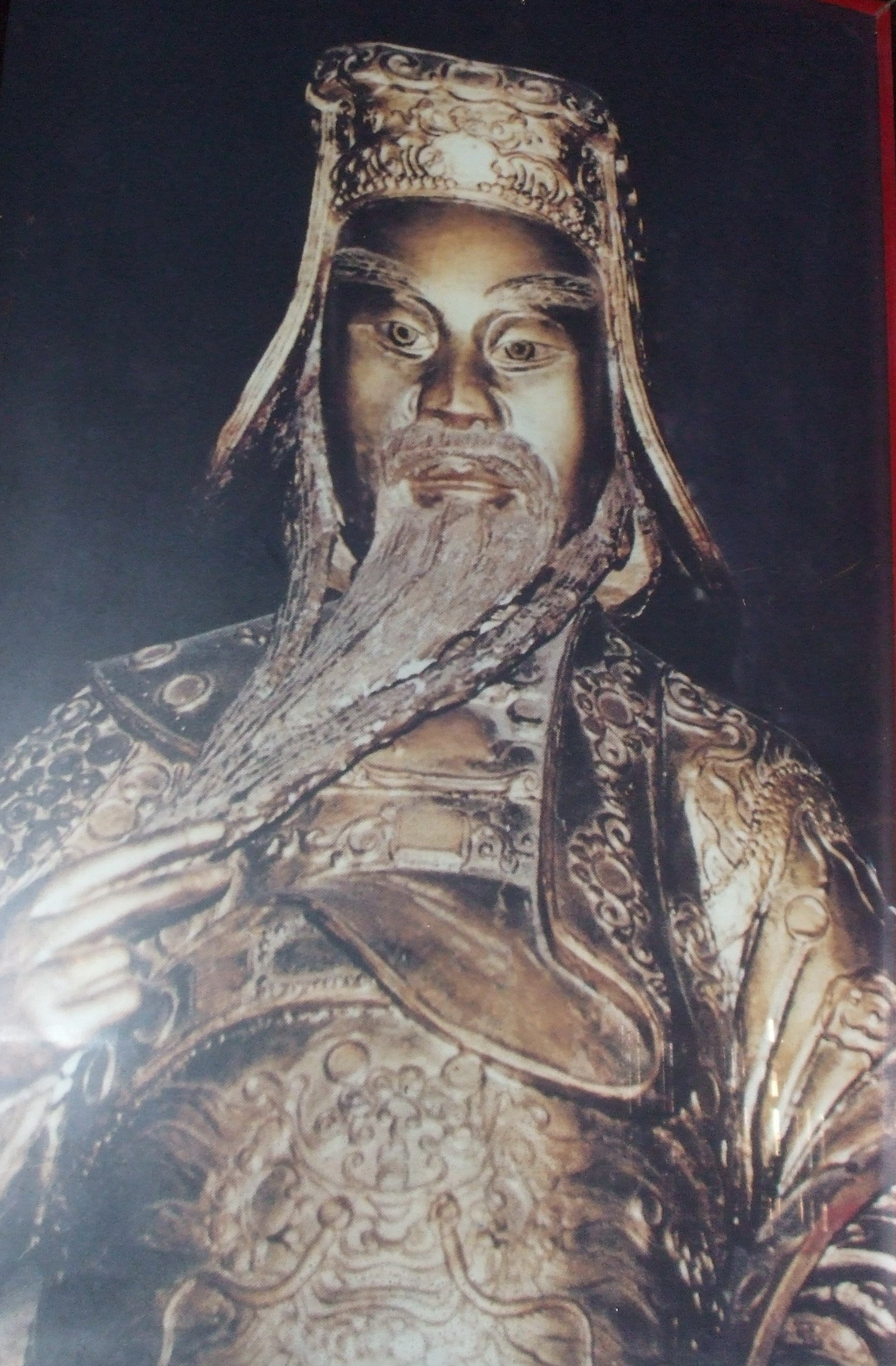
- Born: Nguyễn Hữu Kính; 1650; Quảng Ninh District, Quảng Bình Province, Đàng Trong, Đại Việt
- Died: 1700 (aged 49–50); Rạch Gầm, Mỹ Tho, Đàng Trong, Đại Việt
- Burial place: Trường Thủy, Quảng Bình Province
- Relatives: Nguyễn Hữu Dật (father); Nguyễn Thị Thiện (mother); Nguyễn Hữu Hào (elder brother)
- Military career
- Allegiance: Nguyễn lords
- Conflicts: Battle of Phan Rang (1693); A Ban's revolt (1694); Capture of Saigon (1698); Battle of An Giang (1699); Battle of Rạch Giá (1699); Battle of Kampot (1700); Capture of Phnom Penh (1700)
- Awards: Founder of Saigon-Gia Định

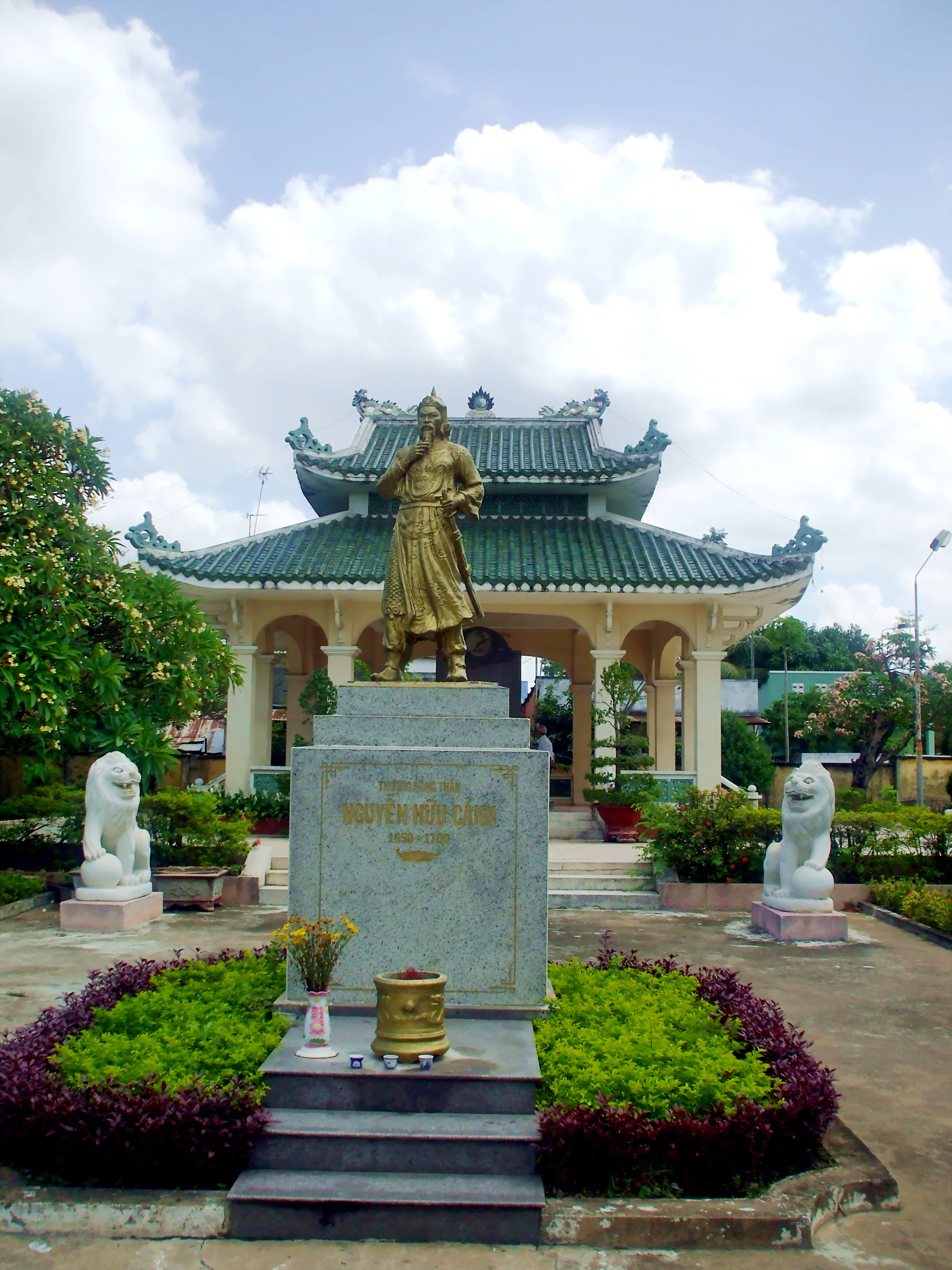
Statue Nguyễn Hữu Cảnh in Biên Hòa

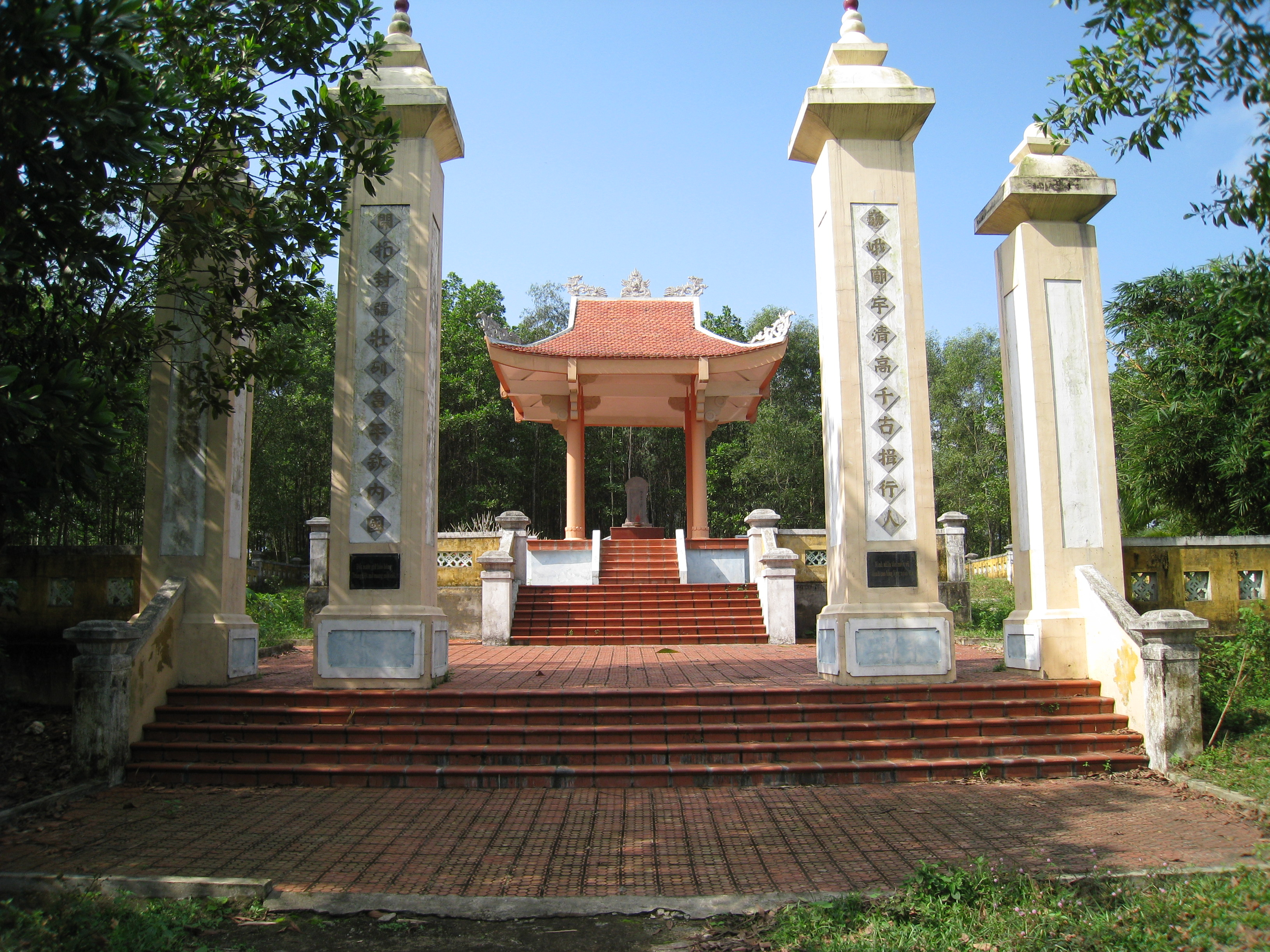
Nguyễn Hữu Cảnh Tomb in Truong Thuy Commune, Lệ Thủy District, Quang Binh

Nguyễn Hữu Cảnh (chữ Hán: 阮有鏡, 1650–1700), also known as Nguyễn Hữu Kính and his noble rank Lễ Thành Hầu, was a high-ranking general of Lord Nguyễn Phúc Chu. His military expeditions into the Mekong Delta placed the region firmly under Vietnamese administrative control. Considered to be the most famous military general during the time of Vietnam's southward expansion (Nam tiến), Nguyễn Hữu Cảnh founded the city of Saigon in 1698. His establishment of Saigon and military forts in and around the Mekong Delta served as the foundation for later military expeditions by the Vietnamese imperial court in its quest to expand its southern territory. In Vietnam, Nguyễn Hữu Cảnh is widely beloved and revered by the Vietnamese as a national hero with various shrines (miếu) and communal houses (đình) dedicated to him.

== Biography ==
Nguyễn Hữu Cảnh was born in Lệ Thủy District in Quảng Bình Province, Bắc Trung Bộ, Vietnam (then part of Đàng Trong). In 1698, Canh was sent by Nguyễn Phúc Chu to the south. He founded Gia Dinh garrison there. He called on people from many places in Central Vietnam to settle in these regions. He ordered the building of roads, canals, markets. Saigon has turned into a busy port city since then.

== Conferred titles and posthumous name ==
Below is the list of conferred titles and posthumous name bestowed upon Lễ Thành Hầu Nguyễn Hữu Cảnh by Vietnamese monarchs.

- was bestowed before 1692
  - Lễ Thành Hầu
    - English: the Marquis of Ideal Ritual Observation
    - Vietnamese: Hầu thông suốt lễ nghi
- was bestowed upon his death, in 1767
  - Hiệp tán công thần, đặc tiến Chưởng dinh, thụy Trung Cần
    - English: His Honorable Military Assistant Attaché, specifically promoted to the post of Provincial Commanding Officer, posthumously named Loyal & Diligent Statesman
    - Vietnamese: phong cho ông mỹ hiệu quan Hiệp tán, và đặc phong cho ông chức Chưởng dinh, với thụy hiệu là vị quan trung thành với triều đình và cần mẫn trong việc nước
- was posthumously bestowed by emperor Gia Long in 1805
  - Tuyên lực công thần, đặc tấn Phụ quốc Thượng tướng quân, Cẩm Y vệ Đô chỉ huy sứ ty Đô chỉ huy sứ, Đô đốc phủ Chưởng phủ sự, phó tướng chưởng cơ Lễ Tài hầu, thụy Tuyên Vũ
    - English: His Exalted Utmost Dedication Official, specifically promoted to Bulwark General of the State, Chief Military Commission for the Imperial Bodyguard, Marshal of the Area Command, Regional Vice Commander & General, Duke of Gifted Ritual Observation, posthumously named Promulgation of Martial Power
    - Vietnamese: phong cho ông mỹ hiệu là vị công thần tận lực với đất nước, đặc tấn chức thượng tướng quân phò trợ đất nước, được lãnh trọng trách đứng đầu cơ quan Cẩm Y Vệ bảo vệ hoàng đế, cùng chức Ngũ quân Đô Thống (là chức của 5 vị tướng lãnh cao nhất thời Nguyễn như Tả Quân, Hữu Quân, v.v) thống lĩnh quân đội toàn quốc, phó tướng, chưởng cơ, với tước là vị Hầu có tài năng về việc lễ nghi, ban thụy hiệu là vị võ quan tuyên dương võ nghiệp
- was posthumously bestowed by emperor Minh Mạng in 1832
  - Thần cơ doanh Đô thống chế, Vĩnh An Hầu
    - English: Supreme Commandant of the Firearms Division, the Marquis of Perpetual Peace
    - Vietnamese: phong cho ông chức quan võ đứng đầu cơ quan Thần Cơ Doanh, là cơ quan với trọng trách bảo vệ kinh thành và kho vũ khí, cùng với các trách nhiệm liên quan đến vũ khí như chế tạo ống phun lửa, súng đạn, pháo hoa, v.v., và phong cho ông tước là vị Hầu (phù hộ cho đất nước được) đời đời bình an
- was bestowed in 1822 in the royal decree conferred to đình Bình Kính (Binh Kinh Communal House), Bien Hoa
  - Thác Cảnh Uy Viễn Chiêu Ứng Thượng Đẳng Thần
    - English: Top-Rank Deity for which His contribution in frontier development & Numinous Grace is far reaching and profound
    - Vietnamese: phong cho ông mỹ hiệu là vị Thượng đẳng thần linh ứng và uy danh khai khẩn đất đai vang dội lẫy lừng
- was bestowed in 1843 in the royal decree conferred to đình Bình Kính (Binh Kinh Communal House), Bien Hoa - added 2 honorific words - Thành Cảm
  - Thác Cảnh Uy Viễn Chiêu Ứng Thành Cảm Thượng Đẳng Thần
    - English: Top-Rank Deity for which His contribution in frontier development & Numinous Grace with Influential Reply is far reaching and profound
    - Vietnamese: phong cho ông mỹ hiệu là vị Thượng đẳng thần linh ứng, chứng giám cho lòng thành khấn vái, và uy danh khai khẩn đất đai vang dội lẫy lừng
- was bestowed in 1843 in the second royal decree conferred to đình Bình Kính (Binh Kinh Communal House), Bien Hoa - added 2 honorific words - Hiển Linh
  - Thác Cảnh Uy Viễn Chiêu Ứng Thành Cảm Hiển Linh Thượng Đẳng Thần
    - English: Celestial Top-Rank Deity for which His contribution in frontier development & Numinous Grace with Influential Reply is far reaching and profound
    - Vietnamese: phong cho ông mỹ hiệu là vị Hiển linh Thượng đẳng thần linh ứng, chứng giám cho lòng thành khấn vái, và uy danh khai khẩn đất đai vang dội lẫy lừng
- was bestowed in 1850 in the royal decree conferred to đình Bình Kính (Binh Kinh Communal House), Bien Hoa - added 2 honorific words - Trác Vĩ
  - Thác Cảnh Uy Viễn Chiêu Ứng Thành Cảm Hiển Linh Trác Vĩ Thượng Đẳng Thần
    - English: Eminently Celestial Top-Rank Deity for which His contribution in frontier development & Numinous Grace with Influential Reply is far reaching and profound
    - Vietnamese: phong cho ông mỹ hiệu là vị Hiển linh Kiệt xuất Thượng đẳng thần linh ứng, chứng giám cho lòng thành khấn vái, và uy danh khai khẩn đất đai vang dội lẫy lừng
