= Hoằng Phúc Temple =

- Vietnamese: Chùa Hoằng Phúc
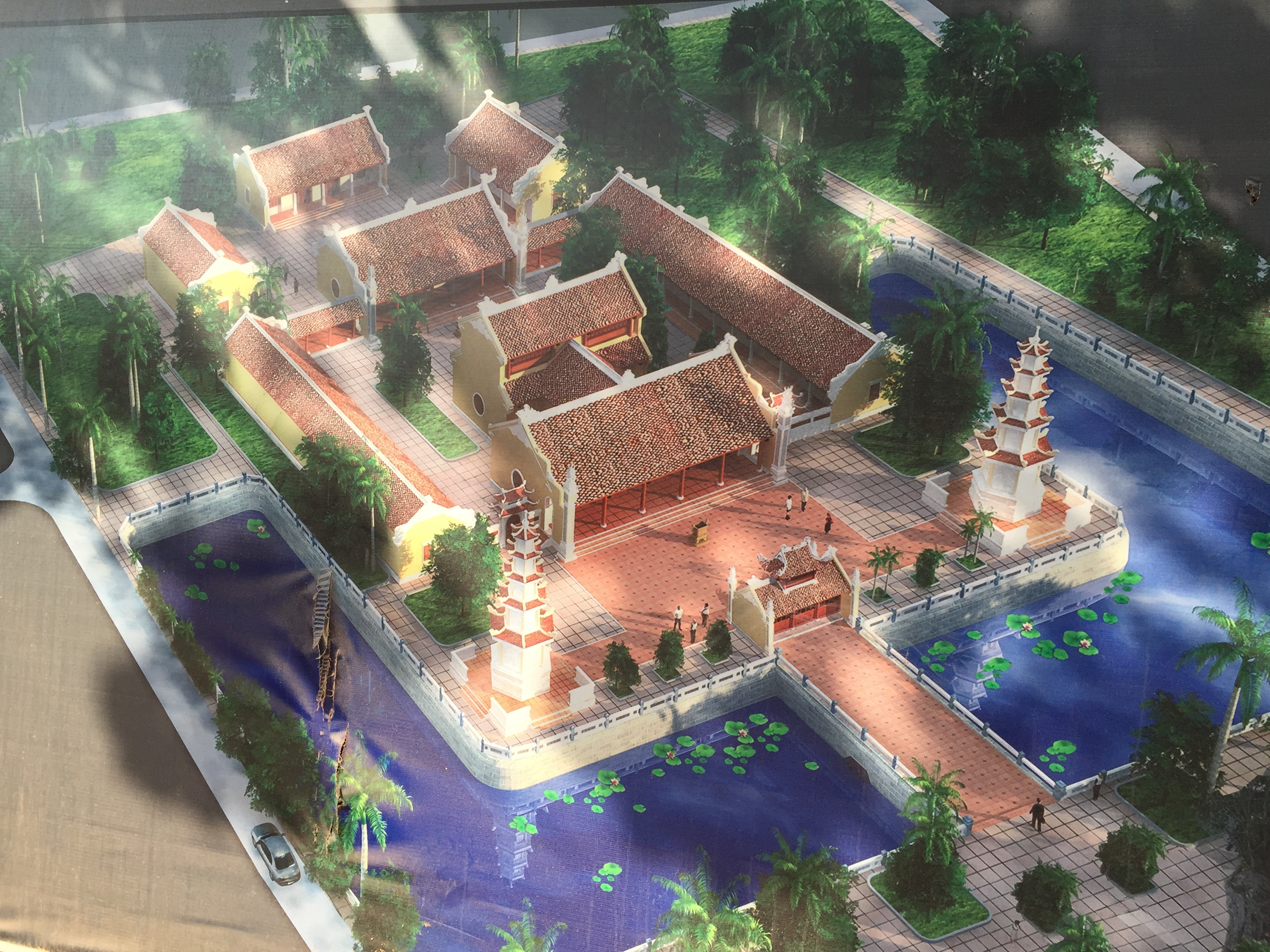
- Image of Hoằng Phúc Temple after reconstruction

- Location within Vietnam
- Former names: Kính Thiên Temple, Quan Temple
- Alternative names: chùa Kính Thiên chùa Quan

General information
- Location: Lệ Thủy District, Quảng Bình Province, Vietnam, Thuan Trach Village, Mỹ Thủy Commune, Lệ Thủy, Quảng Bình, Vietnam
- Coordinates: 17°11′57″N 106°48′50″E

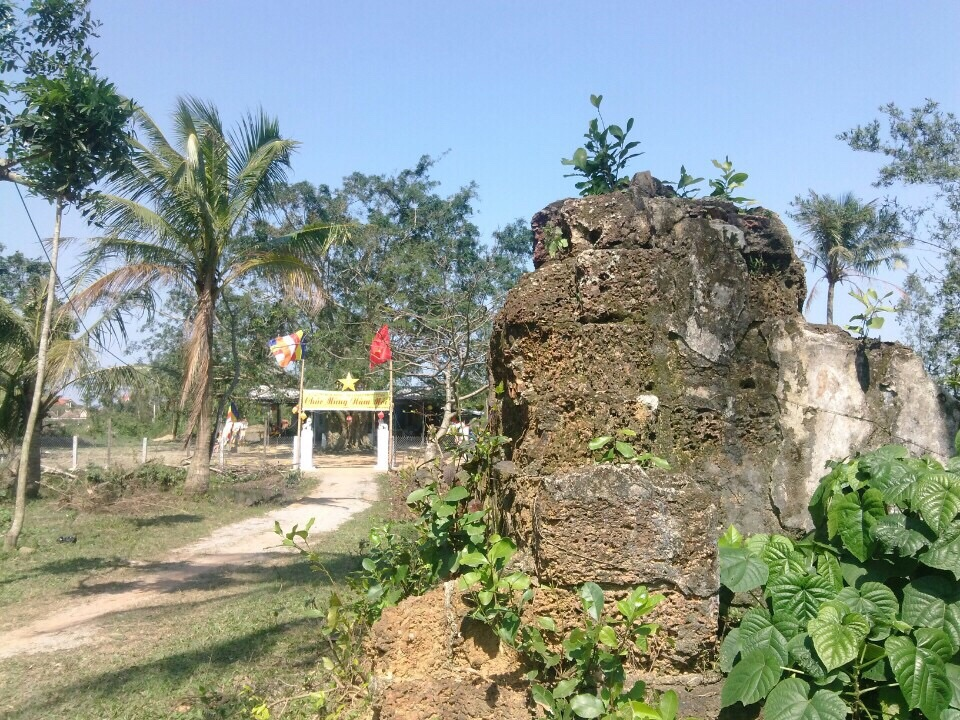
Remaining temple gate

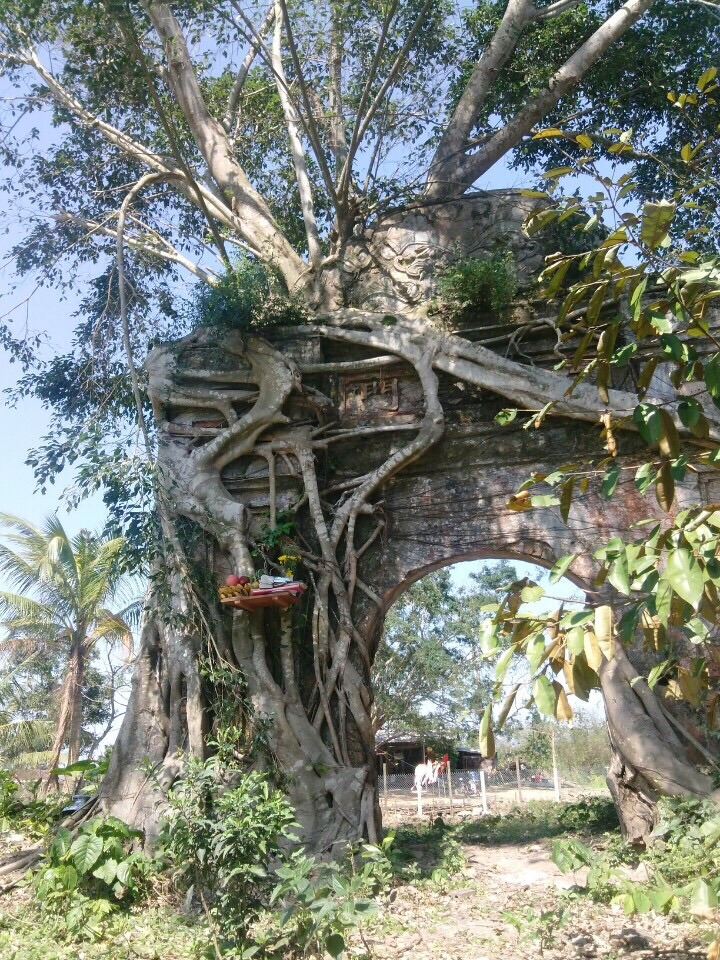
Remaining temple gate

Hoằng Phúc Temple (Vietnamese: Chùa Hoằng Phúc, literally: Great Blessing, chữ Hán: 弘福寺) is a temple located in Thuan Trach Village, Mỹ Thủy Commune, Lệ Thủy District, Quảng Bình Province, North Central Coast Region of Vietnam. The temple has a history of more than 700 years, one of the oldest temples in Central Vietnam.

== History ==
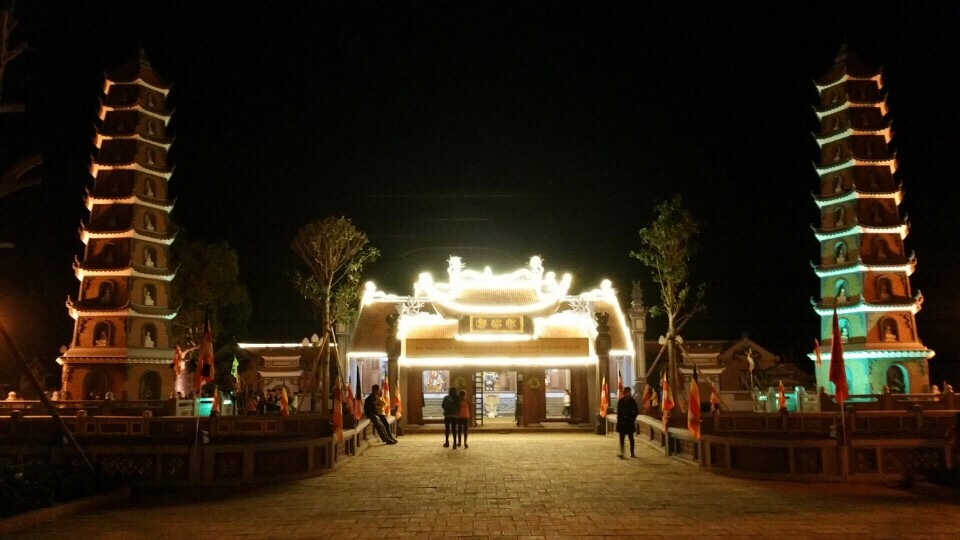
Hoằng Phúc Temple at night

In 1301 Emperor of Trần dynasty, Trần Nhân Tông visited this temple, then called Tri Kien Temple. Nguyễn Phúc Chu, a lord of Nguyễn family renamed this temple Kính Thiên Tự (Kinh Thien Temple) in 1716. Emperor Minh Mạng of Nguyễn dynasty visited this temple in 1821 and renamed this temple Hoằng Phúc Tự (chữ Hán: 弘福寺), colloquially called chùa Trạm or Chùa Quan (Trạm Temple or Quan Temple).

The temple has been rebuilt several times. It was severely devastated by a tropical hurricane in 1985, nothing much remained but the gate and the foundation of the temple and its 80-kg bell, some old Buddha statues. The temple was included in the list of Quảng Bình provincial relics.

In December 2014, the reconstruction of the temple started. On 16 January 2016, the new temple was inaugurated with the participation of several officials from the government of Vietnam, members of the Buddhist Shanghas of Vietnam and Myanmar, Cambodian King of the Monk Tep Vong, and Buddhist followers across Vietnam. Hoằng Phúc Temple is recognized as a national historical relic of Vietnam. On the inaugural day, The Myanmar Buddhist Sangha presented Buddha's śarīra from Shwedagon Pagoda in Yangon to Hoang Phuc Temple.

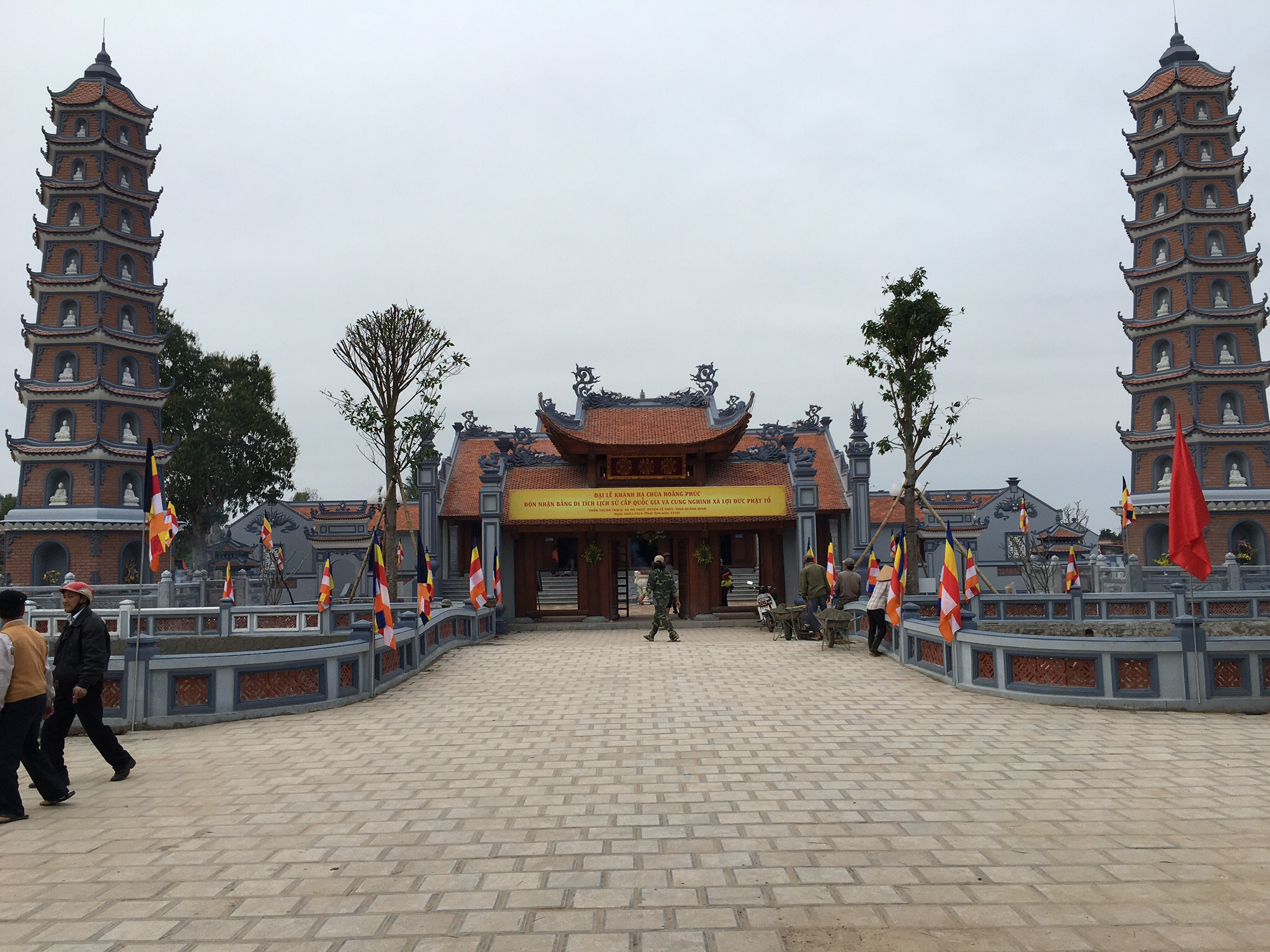
Hoằng Phúc Temple

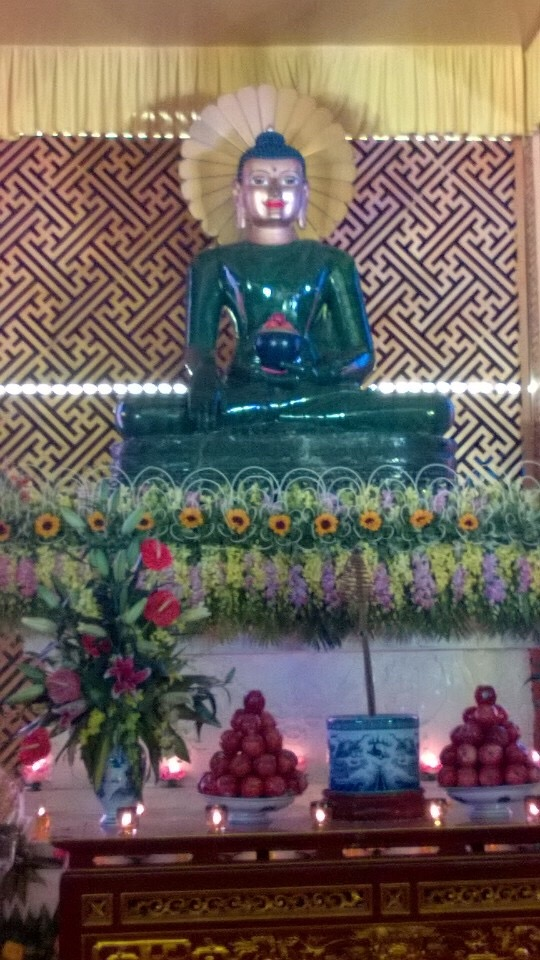
Statue of Jade Buddha for Universal Peace on display at Hoang Phuc Temple from 27 March 2016 to 5 April 2016
