= Kim Thuy =

Kim Thuy may refer to:

- Kim Thủy, a village in the Lệ Thủy District of Vietnam
- Kim Thúy (born 1968), Vietnamese-born Canadian writer
