= Lâm Thị Mỹ Dạ =

Vietnamese poet (1949–2023)

- Pronunciation: /ləm˧ tʰi˨˩ mǐ˧˩˧ za˨˩ʔ/
- Born: September 18, 1949; Lệ Thủy, Quảng Bình, Việt Nam Dân chủ Cộng hòa
- Died: 6 July 2023 (aged 73); Bình Thạnh, Thành phố Hồ Chí Minh, Việt Nam
- Occupations: Poet, Writer
- Notable work: The Heart Gives Birth (Trái tim sinh nở); A Patch of Sky – A Bomb Crater (Khoảng trời – Hố bom)

Lâm Thị Mỹ Dạ (18 September 1949 – 6 July 2023) was a Vietnamese poet. In 2007, she was awarded the State Prize for Literature and Arts.

Lâm was born in Lệ Thủy, Quảng Bình, on 18 September 1949, and died on 6 July 2023, at the age of 73.

== Works ==
- Collection: Green Rice (English translation)
