= Mỹ Trạch massacre =

1947 massacre of civilians by French soldiers in Quảng Bình Province, Vietnam

- Part of the First Indochina War
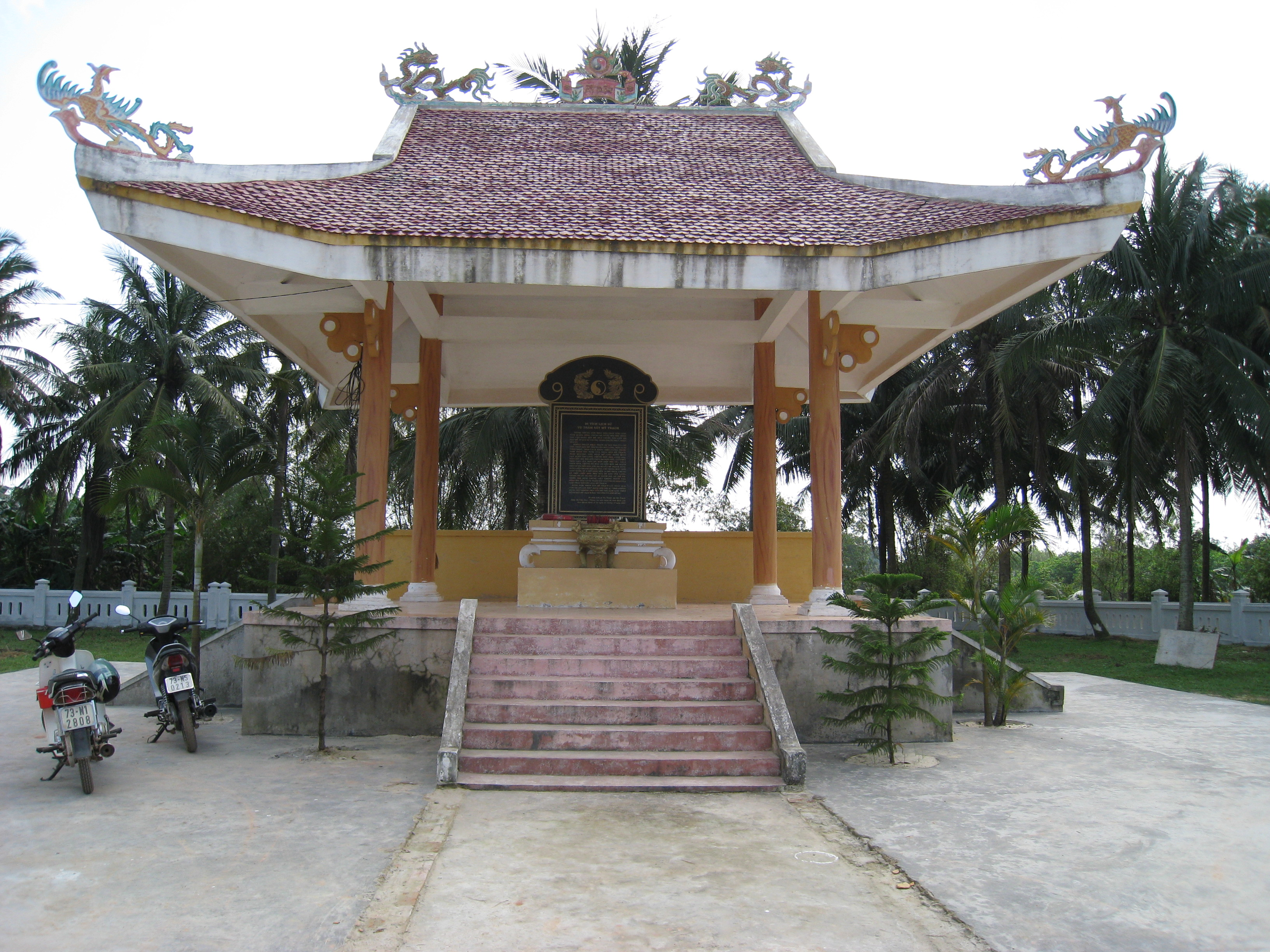
- Memorial park with the memorial stele to the victims of the massacre
- Native name: Thảm sát Mỹ Trạch
- Location: Mỹ Trạch village, Mỹ Thủy commune, Lệ Thủy District, Quảng Bình Province, Vietnam
- Date: 29 November 1948
- Target: Vietnamese civilians
- Attack type: Massacre, mass rape, torture
- Weapon: Automatic firearms
- Deaths: Over 300
- Perpetrator: French Army
- Motive: Anti-Vietnamese racism

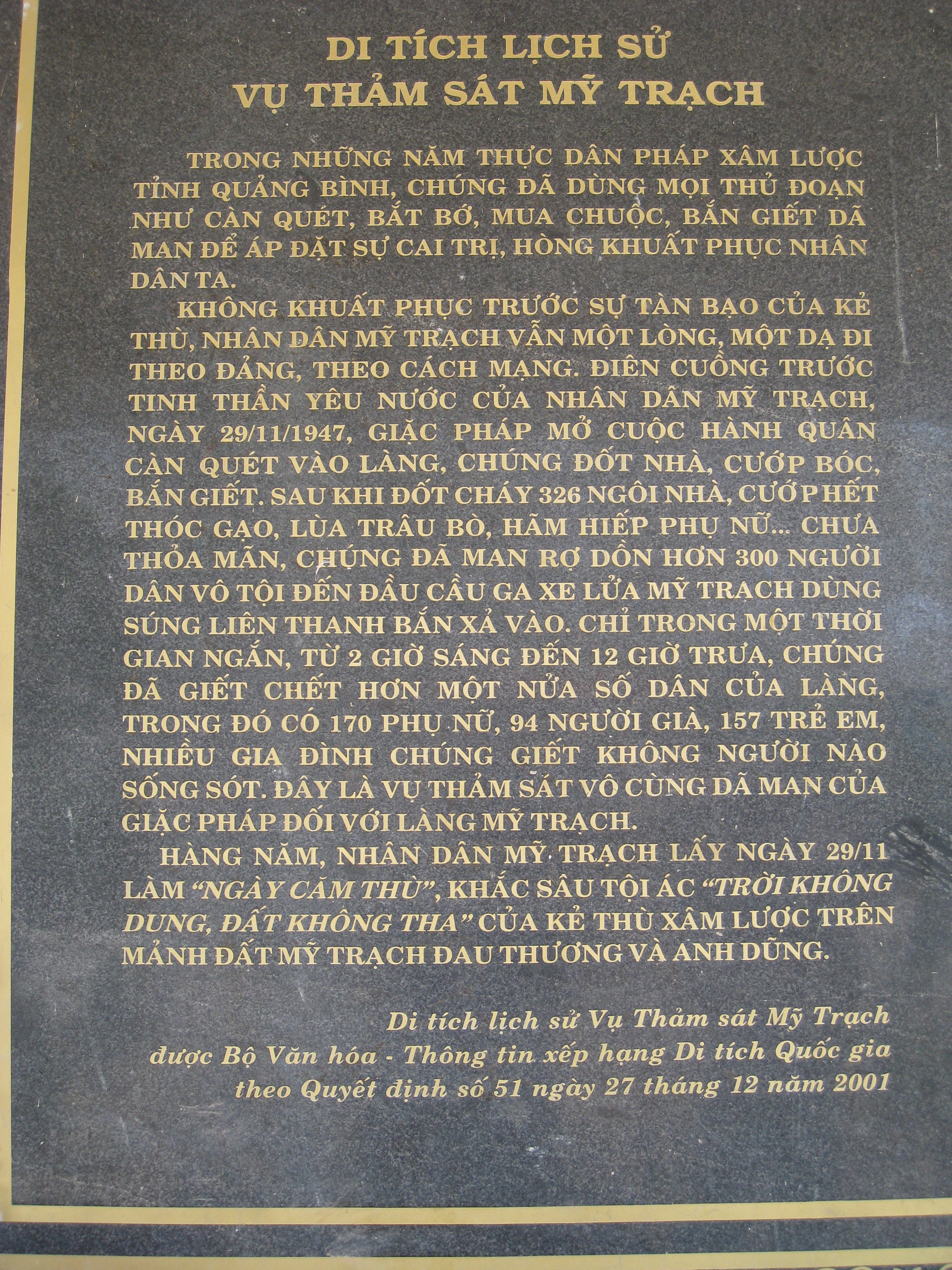
Memorial stele to the victims of Mỹ Trạch Massacre

The Mỹ Trạch Massacre (Vietnamese: Thảm sát Mỹ Trạch) was a mass murder and wartime rape committed by the French Army against Vietnamese civilians in the First Indochina War. French soldiers committed the massacre in Mỹ Trạch village, Mỹ Thủy commune, Lệ Thủy District, Quảng Bình Province, Vietnam from 5 am to 8 am on 29 November 1948. The French Army burned 326 houses and murdered more than half of the village's residents. French soldiers raped many women and girls before murdering them. The French Army murdered over 300 civilian residents in Mỹ Trạch, including 170 women and 157 children.

The location of the massacre was in the foot of Mỹ Trạch Bridge, a bridge located on the North–South Railway, next to Mỹ Trạch Railway Station. French soldiers forced the victims to the foot of the bridge and lined them up before murdering them with machine gun fire.

Every year, residents of Mỹ Trạch mourn 29 November as "Hatred Date."

On 27 December 2001, The Ministry of Culture of Vietnam classified the memorial park in which the memorial site is located as one of the National Historical Relics of Vietnam.
