= Lý Sơn =

Lý Sơn Đặc khu Lý Sơn
- Special administrative region
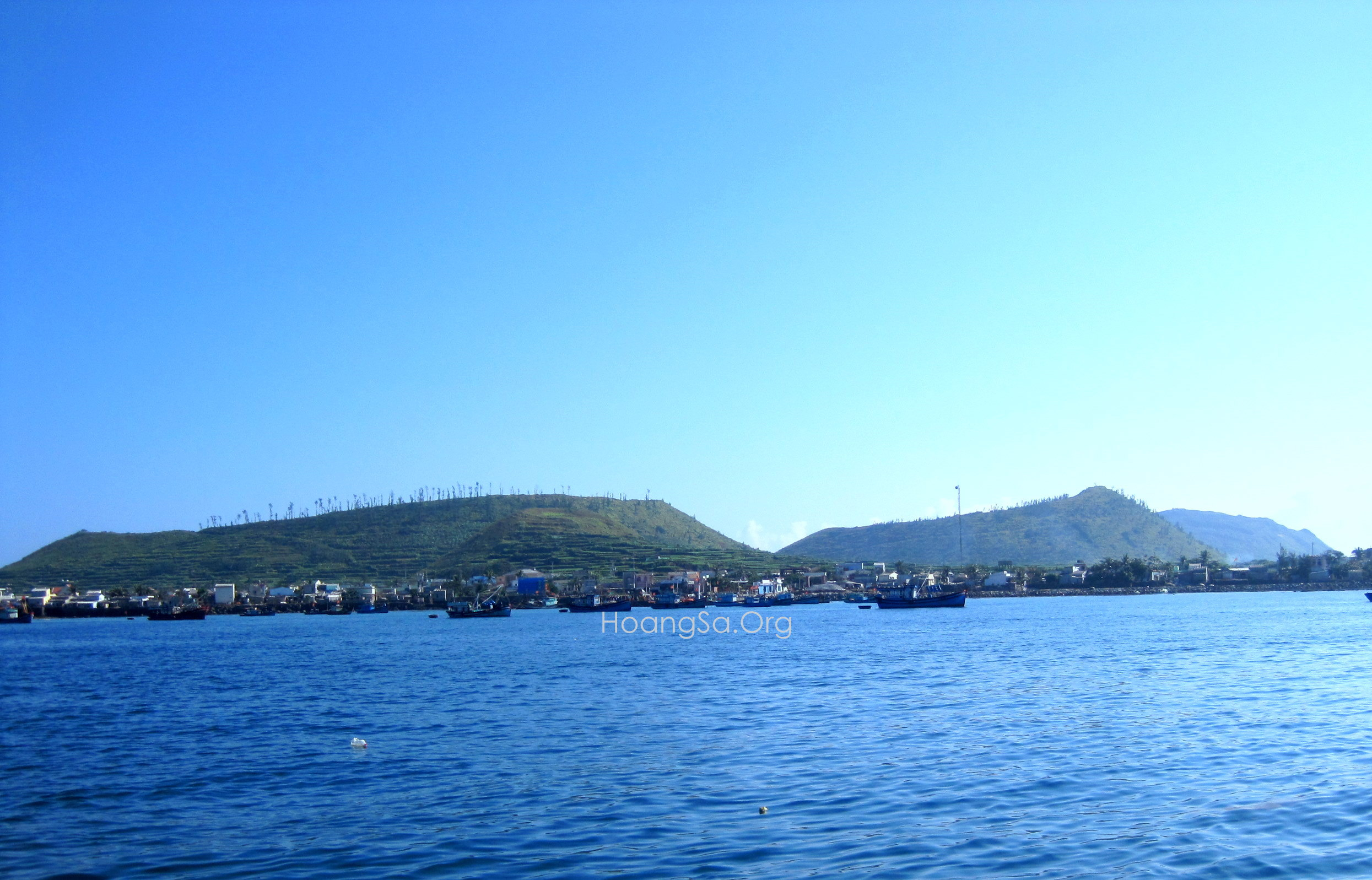
- View of Lý Sơn Special administrative region
- Interactive map of Lý Sơn
- Location of Lý Sơn District in Vietnam
- Coordinates: 15°22′51″N 109°07′03″E
- Country: Vietnam
- Region: South Central Coast and Central Highlands
- Province: Quảng Ngãi
- Capital: Lý Sơn

Area
  - Total: 10.39 km^{2} (4.01 sq mi)

Population (2019)
  - Total: 22,174
  - Density: 2,134/km^{2} (5,527/sq mi)
- Time zone: UTC+7 (UTC + 7)

Lý Sơn, previously known as Cù Lao Ré, is an insular region of Quảng Ngãi province, lying off the South Central Coast and Central Highlands of Vietnam.

== Geography and geology ==
The district covers approximately 9.97 square kilometres (3.85 sq mi) of land on the Cù Lao Ré volcanic islands, consisting of two off-shore volcanic islands in the South China Sea, and a few islets. The main island, Lý Sơn (Cù Lao Ré) has three prominent craters, the largest of which is Mount Thoi Loi (Thới Lới). Hydrothermal waters on Lý Sơn provide heat for the local power plant. The secondary island is known as Little Island (Cù Lao Bờ Bãi) and is also well populated.

== Climate ==
Climate data for Lý Sơn
Month	Jan	Feb	Mar	Apr	May	Jun	Jul	Aug	Sep	Oct	Nov	Dec	Year
Record high °C (°F)	30.4 (86.7)	29.9 (85.8)	31.7 (89.1)	33.7 (92.7)	35.9 (96.6)	36.4 (97.5)	36.2 (97.2)	36.8 (98.2)	35.5 (95.9)	33.0 (91.4)	31.5 (88.7)	31.0 (87.8)	36.8 (98.2)
Mean daily maximum °C (°F)	25.2 (77.4)	25.7 (78.3)	26.8 (80.2)	28.9 (84.0)	31.2 (88.2)	32.4 (90.3)	32.5 (90.5)	32.5 (90.5)	31.0 (87.8)	29.2 (84.6)	27.8 (82.0)	25.8 (78.4)	29.1 (84.4)
Daily mean °C (°F)	23.1 (73.6)	23.4 (74.1)	24.3 (75.7)	26.3 (79.3)	28.3 (82.9)	29.5 (85.1)	29.5 (85.1)	29.5 (85.1)	28.4 (83.1)	27.1 (80.8)	25.9 (78.6)	24.0 (75.2)	26.6 (79.9)
Mean daily minimum °C (°F)	21.7 (71.1)	21.8 (71.2)	22.8 (73.0)	24.6 (76.3)	26.3 (79.3)	27.2 (81.0)	27.2 (81.0)	27.2 (81.0)	26.2 (79.2)	25.2 (77.4)	24.3 (75.7)	22.6 (72.7)	24.7 (76.5)
Record low °C (°F)	16.9 (62.4)	16.3 (61.3)	15.4 (59.7)	19.8 (67.6)	21.8 (71.2)	23.1 (73.6)	23.0 (73.4)	22.9 (73.2)	21.8 (71.2)	21.2 (70.2)	20.0 (68.0)	17.1 (62.8)	15.4 (59.7)
Average precipitation mm (inches)	123.9 (4.88)	53.5 (2.11)	89.1 (3.51)	61.7 (2.43)	113.5 (4.47)	56.1 (2.21)	52.5 (2.07)	124.8 (4.91)	411.7 (16.21)	513.2 (20.20)	429.7 (16.92)	262.5 (10.33)	2,302.8 (90.66)
Average rainy days	14.4	8.5	7.1	4.8	6.4	4.4	5.3	8.2	14.8	19.6	19.7	19.4	133.0
Average relative humidity (%)	85.5	88.2	89.9	89.5	86.4	81.8	80.3	80.0	83.5	85.3	85.6	84.7	85.2
Mean monthly sunshine hours	147.2	170.3	213.0	230.	278.3	264.9	265.8	254.3	197.2	164.6	138.0	101.4	2,394.3
Source: Vietnam Institute for Building Science and Technology

== History ==
Remains of the pre-200 C.E. Sa Huỳnh culture have been found on the islands. The Cham used Ly Son as a transhipment base. Xó La well, one of the wells used to provide fresh water for ships, still remains on the shore of the main island and is still in use. The islands were used as a geographical landmark for navigation by Admiral Zheng He's crew during the 15th-century treasure voyages. In the 17th century the Nguyễn lords started a colony on the islands from An Vĩnh, Bình Sơn district, in Quảng Ngãi, as part of the activities of the Hoàng Sa Company's development of the Paracel Islands. During the United States involvement in the Vietnam War, Lý Sơn was the site of a U.S. Navy radar installation that was used to track shipping along the Vietnamese coast.

== Economy ==
The economy was founded on, and remains, primarily based on seafood extraction. Lý Sơn is a major offshore fishing center with an output of 29,000 tonnes worth VND241.2 billion ($11.4 million) in 2012, accounting for almost one fourth of Quảng Ngãi's total.

Lý Sơn is also known throughout Vietnam for its production of a special variety of garlic, although coastal sand mining to support its extensive cultivation has led to significant erosion. In the 21st century Lý Sơn began to develop its tourist industry.

== Tourism ==
Lý Sơn island is well known for its number of scenic spots and freshly-served seafood among Vietnamese locals.

Here are the following tourism attractions:

- To Vo Gate (Cổng Tò Vò)
- Mount Thoi Loi (Núi Thới Lới)
- Hang Cave (Hang Câu)
- Garlic fields

== Culture ==
As in other parts of coastal Vietnam whales are important in local mythology and religion. Around one hundred whale skeletons are kept in temples, the largest and most important of which is in Tan Temple in An Hai Commune. According to a local legend, the 200-year-old skeleton are the remains of Nam Hai Dong Dinh Dai Vuong (the king of whales), the most powerful whale in the South China Sea. Whale skeletons are worshiped and huge funerals are held when a stranded whale is found because they are believed to protect fishers while they are at sea.

== Administrative divisions ==
Lý Sơn district is a special district. It is not divided into administrative divisions.

== Gallery ==
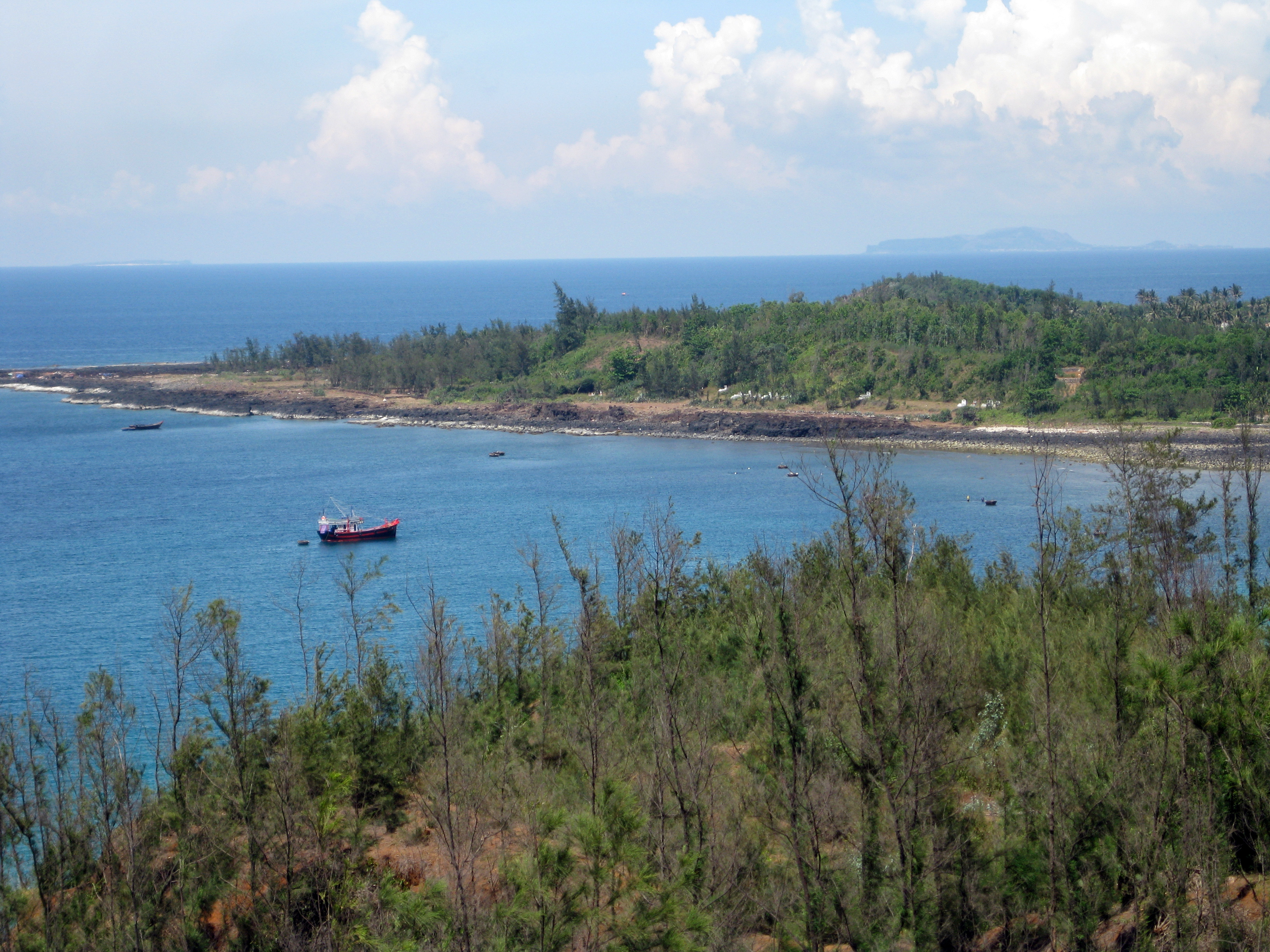
Lý Sơn Island in the background, seen from Sơn Thủy area.

== Notes ==
References

- Hardy, Andrew (2009): "Eaglewood and the Economic History of Champa and Central Vietnam" in Hardy, Andrew et al.: Champa and the Archeology of My Son (Vietnam). NUS Press, Singapore
