= Hò khoan =

Vietnamese folk music song style

Hò khoan Lệ Thủy, the "ho! row!" song of Lệ Thủy District, Quảng Bình Province, is a Vietnamese folk music song style.

The term hò can be translated "heave-ho!" and is a generic call in labouring songs, khoan means to row. The refrain "khoan khoan hò khoan!" ("row-row! ho! row!") references rowing. The song is characterized both by its antiphonal nature, with alternating groups of female and male singers issuing musical challenges and responses, and by the fact that most of the songs in the repertoire deal with topics of love and sentimentality as experienced by young adult.

Hò khoan Lệ Thủy originated from Lệ Thủy District, Quảng Bình Province, North Central Coast, Vietnam. Local residents used to sing hò khoan when they worked in groups so that it would help them eliminate tiredness and speed up the productivity. Nowadays, hò khoan is sung mainly in local festivals and the original labouring songs have faded away. The San Francisco-based tenor Nguyẽ̂n Thành Vân released a CD Hò khoan Lệ Thủy - River Song in 1997.

The first lines of a well-known version of Hò Khoan Lệ Thủy begin:

(Nữ) Hò khoan (hơ) hời khoan (hơ) mời bạn xô (hơ) hô khoan
(Xô) Ơ là hô!
(Nữ) Thiếp gặp chàng dạ mừng hớn hở
Chàng gặp thiếp như mà hoa nở trên (hơ) bồn

This translates as:

(Female solo) Heave-ho, please join in the singing
(Chorus) Heave-ho
(Female solo) When I met you I was full of joy
When you met me, you felt like a flower blossoming

== See also ==
- Quan họ
