= Đông Trạch =

Coordinates: 19°56′N 105°26′E

- Commune and village
- Interactive map of Đông Trạch
- Country: Vietnam
- Province: Quảng Trị
- Time zone: UTC+07:00

Đông Trạch is a commune (xã) and village in Quảng Trị Province, in Vietnam.

On June 16, 2025, the Standing Committee of the National Assembly issued Resolution No. 1680/NQ-UBTVQH15 on the reorganization of commune-level administrative units in Quảng Trị Province in 2025. Accordingly, the entire natural area and population of Hải Phú Commune (Bố Trạch District), Sơn Lộc Commune, Đức Trạch Commune, and Đồng Trạch Commune were reorganized to form a new commune named Đông Trạch Commune.
