= Đa Mai =

- Ward
- Interactive map of Đa Mai
- Coordinates: 21°17′35″N 106°10′25″E
- Country: Vietnam
- City: Bắc Ninh
- Time zone: UTC+07:00 (Indochina Time)

Đa Mai is a ward (phường) of Bắc Ninh, Vietnam.
