= Phú Thủy =

- Ward
- Hùng Vương Roundabout
- Interactive map of Phú Thủy
- Coordinates: 10.932442340540586°N 108.11248830712869°E
- Country: Vietnam
- Region: South Central Coast and Central Highlands
- Province: Lâm Đồng
- Established: 16 June 2025
- Administrative headquarters: 400 Võ Văn Kiệt Street

Area
  - Total: 17.31 km^{2} (6.68 sq mi)

Population (31 December 2024)
  - Total: 54,049
  - Density: 3,122/km^{2} (8,090/sq mi)
- Website: phuthuy.lamdong.gov.vn

Phú Thủy is a ward in Lâm Đồng province, Vietnam.

On 16 June 2025, the Standing Committee of the National Assembly of Vietnam issued Resolution No. 1671/NQ-UBTVQH15 on the arrangement of commune-level administrative units in Lâm Đồng province in 2025. Under the resolution, the entire area and population of Thanh Hải, Phú Hài (formerly Phú Hải and Phố Hài), and Phú Thủy wards, formerly part of Phan Thiết, Bình Thuận province, were merged to form a new ward named Phú Thủy.
