= Cu Lao Cham Marine Park =

Biosphere reserve in Vietnam

Cu Lao Cham Marine Park Cu Lao Cham Biosphere Reserve Cham Islands Marine Park
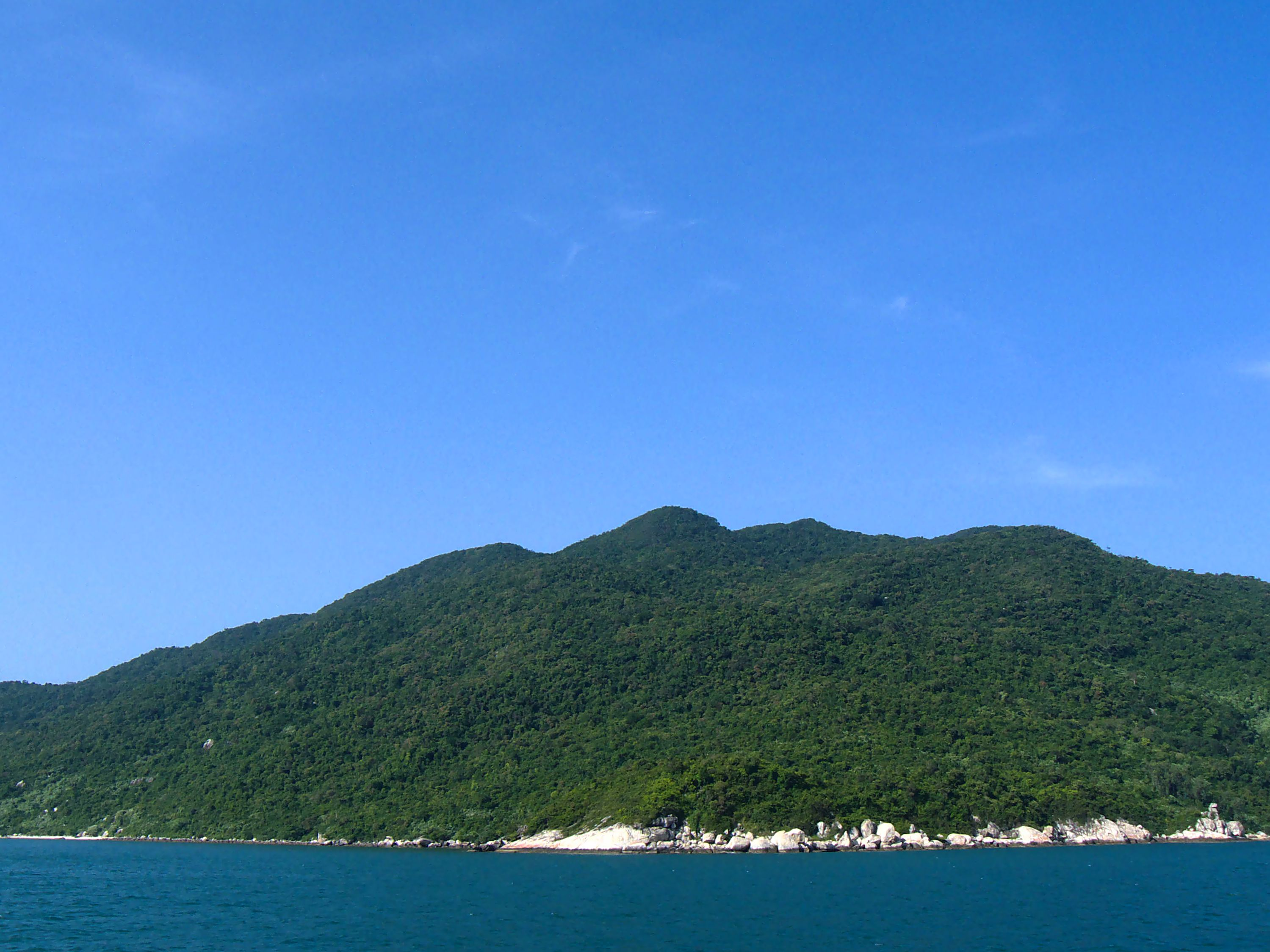
- The Main Island - Cu Lao Cham Marine Park; Cham Islands Marine Park

- Location within Vietnam
- Nearest city: Hội An
- Coordinates: 15°57′02″N 108°40′55″E
- Area: 50 km^{2} (19 sq mi)
- Established: 2009

Cu Lao Cham Marine Park also known as Cham Islands Biosphere Reserve is part of the eight islets of the Chàm Islands, located in the South China Sea under the administration of Tân Hiệp Commune and Hội An town, in Quảng Nam Province, Vietnam. The terrestrial and coastal ecosystems of the islands have been recognized as a global Biosphere Reserve by UNESCO on 26 May 2009 under its 'Man and the Biosphere Programme' for their rich biodiversity value. The ecosystem also includes the ancient Hội An, which is 20 kilometres (12 mi) away from the islands, a UNESCO World Heritage Site.

The Biosphere reserve area covers 5,000 hectares (12,000 acres) including 165 hectares (410 acres) of coral reefs and 500 hectares (1,200 acres) of underwater plant life. 947 aquatic species have also been identified in the biosphere.

== Objective ==
The Cham Island Biosphere Reserve, which comprises a group of 8 coastal islands and marine site in the central part of the Vietnam, is now one of the 553 UNESCO Biosphere Reserve sites in 107 countries of the world. The objective of declaring the islands as Biosphere Reserve is to adopt different approaches of integrated management of terrestrial, freshwater, coastal and marine resources and biodiversity. The biodiversity marine species of the reserve are particularly corals, molluscs, crustaceans and seaweed. This ecosystem also includes Hội An, a UNESCO cultural World Heritage Site, which is well known as an ancient trading port that blends Vietnamese and European cultures; this blend is expected to encourage sustainable ecotourism.

== Topography ==
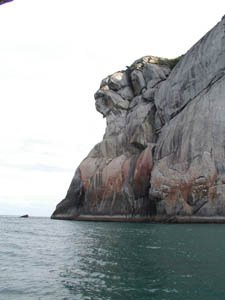
Rocky hill of the main island abutting the sea

The islands that constitute the biosphere are eight, including the main island of Hòn Lao (pearl). The other seven small islands, with their meanings in English, are: the Hòn Dài (long), Hòn Khô mẹ or the mother Hòn Khô (dry), Hòn Khô con or the child Hòn Khô, Hòn Lá (leaf), Hòn Tai (ear) and Hòn Ông (east wind). Each islet has mountains and sand beaches. The uncluttered, least inhabited island group, with their steep rock slopes, sea waves and rich vegetation has been given the soubriquet “unpolished sapphires”.

In this group, the largest island of Hòn Lao has an area of 1,317 hectares (3,250 acres) and has two mountains, one a 517 metres (1,696 ft) peak in the centre of the island and another a 326 metres (1,070 ft) peak at the western end. The historical monuments include the 300-year-old Hai Tang Pagoda set amidst three mountains known as Bat Long, Ngoa Long and Time.

The swamps and marshes of maritime-marsh origin evolved as a result of receding seas in ancient times (about 2000 years old). These areas are located to the east of the township of Hội An (in the villages of Cam Chau, Cam An, and Cam Thanh). They are also found in stretches along the coast, south of the Thu Bon River that runs past Trung Phuong (Duy Xuyen district). These are to be developed into income generating zones for the people.

== Biodiversity ==
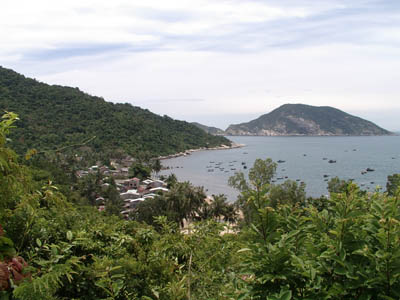
Rich terrestrial and aquatic biodiversity of the Islands

The rich biodiversity of the islands comprise both terrestrial and aquatic marine ecosystem.

Terrestrial

The major terrestrial ecosystem components are: "the seagrass beds, seaweeds, coral reefs, mangroves, tropical rainforests and others" and the major habitats are "Forest, sea beaches, rocky hills and mountains, rice and other cultivation, grass fields and others".

The terrestrial resources consist of the traditional resources extracted from the islands by the Cham people of the islands. These comprise rice farming, trading in pepper, cinnamon bark, ivory and wood for trading with neighbouring countries, accessed through the port of Hoi An.

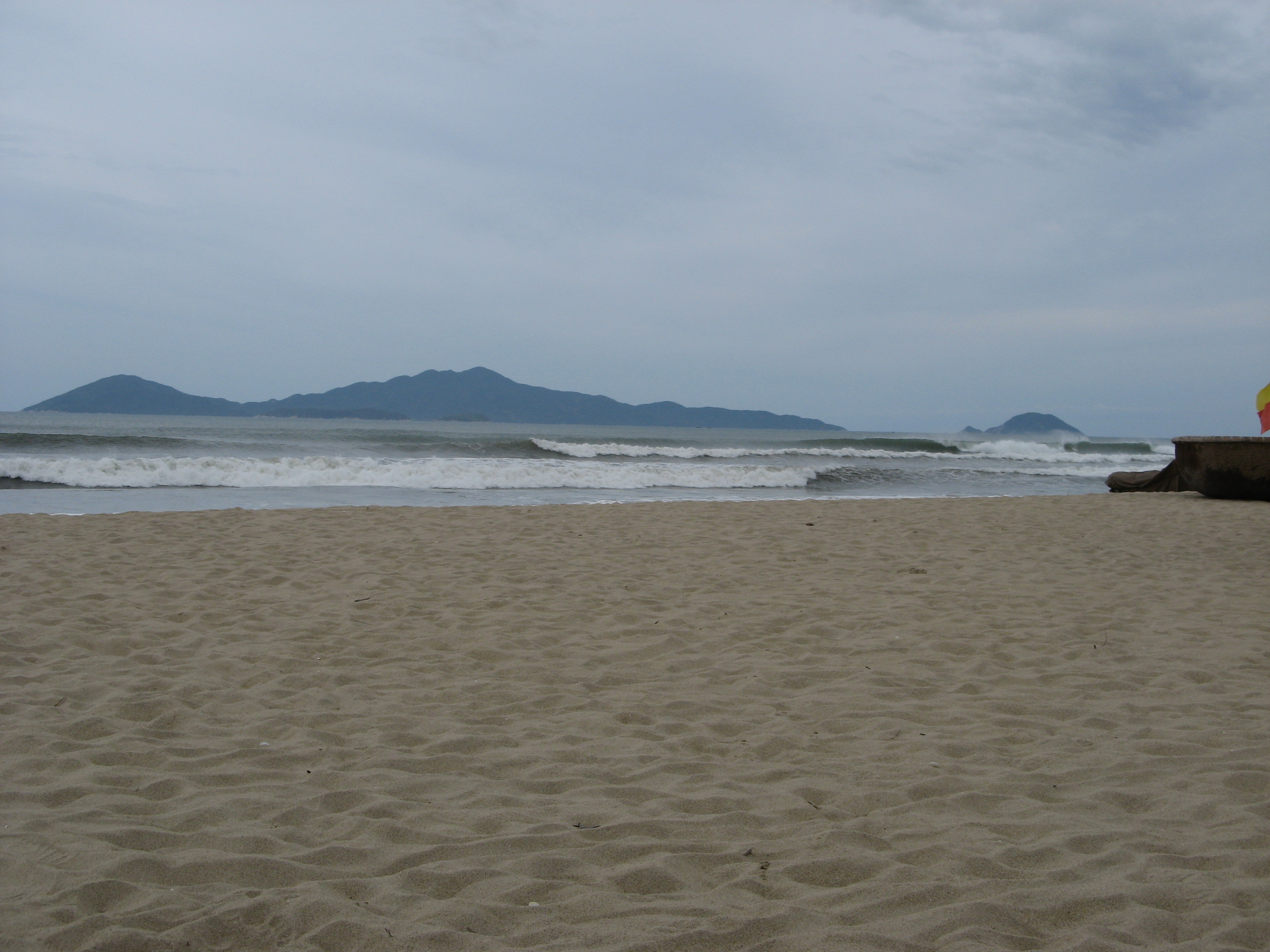
Rich biodiversity of the aquatic ecosystem

The most important terrestrial fauna of the islands are the salanganes, also called swallows, whose nests have been a source of revenue to the local people. These are a delicacy, favoured by the rich and the famous for providing the ingredients for the popular Chinese dish known as birds nest soup. On a clear day, on the hills of the islands, the nests and nest harvesters can be seen interacting. The swallow nest harvesting is an industry in the islands, which provides important revenue to the state. The annual Swallow harvest is reported to be about 1.4 tonnes, valued at US$4,000 per kilogram.

Aquatic

The aquatic system is composed of 500 hectares (1,200 acres) of seaweed algae, marine algae and sea grass. With its165 hectares (410 acres) of coral and sea creatures, the island is known as a "kingdom of aquatic animals". The coral species identified are 135. The algae and sea grass species number. The fish fauna has been recorded as 202 species, in addition to 4 species of lobster and 84 species of molluscs. Coral and shoals of colourful fish are seen in the clear fresh water zones. Some of these species are listed in the Vietnam's and the World's Red Book of Endangered Species. Medicinal plants have also been inventoried on the islands.

== History ==
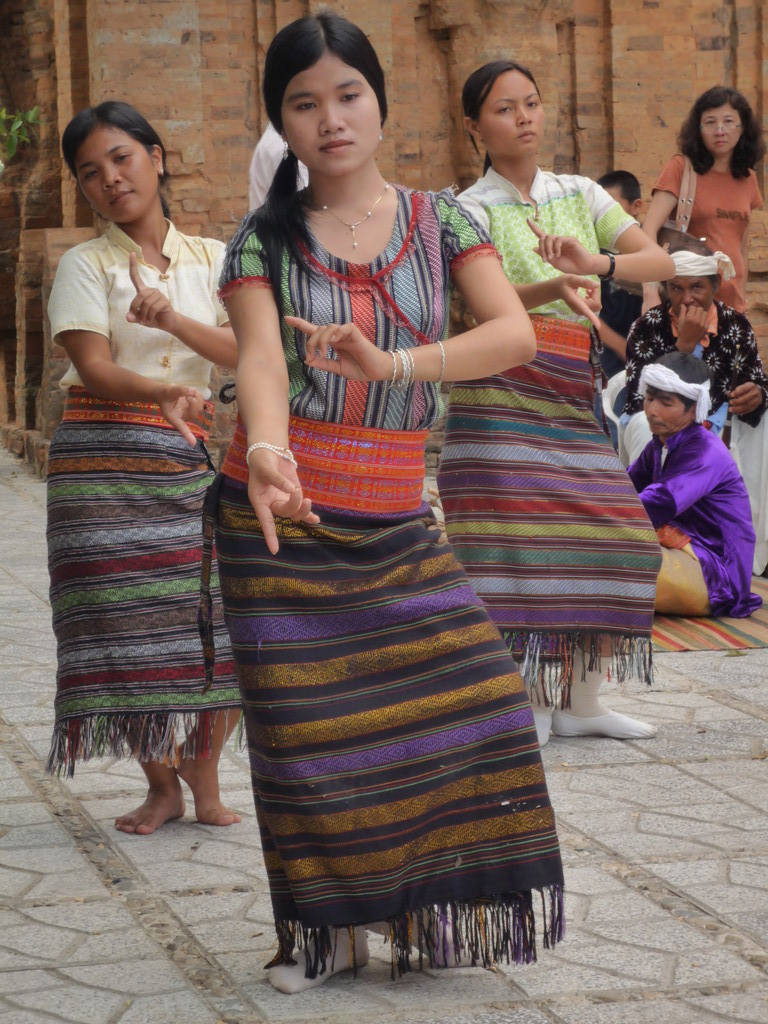
Cham dancers performing in a temple in Vietnam

The social history of the islands is traced to the Cham people who reside in these islands. They have inhabited the islands from 2nd century AD and are of Austronesian descent. They have been subject to attrition by wars by the Chinese and internecine wars with Khmer regime on the south and the Vietnamese to the north during the 10th century and finally they were fully subsumed within the present day Vietnam. However, their identity as a major ethnic group in Vietnam has been recognized. They retain their ethnic culture, which is rooted mainly in Hinduism. Islam and Buddhism have made inroads into their social culture and ethnic diversity since the 14th century. Their written language is a derivative of Sanskrit. Mỹ Sơn was their religious centre at the height of a Hindu empire, which ruled from Da Nang, which was the capital of Champa in the past.

== Integrated management ==
As one of the six UNESCO recognized biosphere reserves in Vietnam, the Island Reserve, inhabited by about 3,000 people (mostly of fishermen community) in a total area of 15 square kilometres (5.8 mi^{2}), is now slated for integrated conservation and development efforts. The conservation efforts shall cover two core areas with emphasis on land/seascape diversity, habitats, species and genetic resources. The corridor that lies between the two core areas is a major factor to the biodiversity to recover the "marine ecosystems in the whole area".

Now, under the proposed integrated biosphere reserve conservation programme, which will be coordinated by the People Committee of Hội An City, plans have been drawn for sustainable development of the area with emphasis on preservation of the environment concurrent with enhancing the income generating capacity of the local people. The issues proposed to be addressed are: to conserve biodiversity, cultural diversity and natural resources with due regard to cultural values; conserve anthropogenic ecosystems; improve the natural environment; create corridors of ecological zones; restore and rehabilitate environmentally degraded areas. The research and monitoring activities proposed to achieve these goals are climatological and hydrological measurements, abiotic assessments, biodiversity inventorying and assessment of all related socio economic factors. Integrated monitoring is an essential feature to assess and evaluate all studies to evolve appropriate action plans for the biosphere conservation and preservation.
