= Tân Thủy =

- Commune
- Interactive map of Tân Thủy
- Coordinates: 10.00836838206859°N 106.6202655664818°E
- Country: Vietnam
- Province: Vĩnh Long
- Region: Mekong Delta
- Established: 16 June 2025
- Seat: Ấp Tân Bình

Area
  - Total: 52.55 km^{2} (20.29 sq mi)

Population (31 December 2024)
  - Total: 45,743
  - Density: 870/km^{2} (2,300/sq mi)

Tân Thủy is a commune in Vĩnh Long province, Vietnam.

On 12 June 2025, the National Assembly of Vietnam adopted Resolution No. 202/2025/QH15 on the reorganization of provincial-level administrative units. Under the resolution, the entire area and population of Bến Tre province, Vĩnh Long, and Trà Vinh province were reorganized into a new province named Vĩnh Long.

On 16 June 2025, the Standing Committee of the National Assembly of Vietnam adopted Resolution No. 1687/NQ-UBTVQH15 on the reorganization of commune-level administrative units in Vĩnh Long province in 2025. Under the resolution, the entire area and population of Tiệm Tôm township and the communes of An Hòa Tây and Tân Thủy in the former Ba Tri district, Bến Tre province, were consolidated to form a new commune named Tân Thủy.
