= Sen Ngư =

- Commune and village
- Country: Vietnam
- Province: Quảng Trị
- Time zone: UTC+07:00

Sen Ngư is a commune (xã) and village in Quảng Trị Province, in Vietnam.

On June 16, 2025, the Standing Committee of the National Assembly issued Resolution No. 1680/NQ-UBTVQH15 on the reorganization of commune-level administrative units in Quảng Trị Province in 2025. Accordingly, Hưng Thủy Commune, Sen Thủy Commune, and Ngư Thủy Commune were merged to form a new commune named Sen Ngư Commune.
