= Lệ Ninh =

Coordinates: 17°15′34″N 106°42′2″E

- Commune
- Interactive map of Lệ Ninh
- Country: Vietnam
- Province: Quảng Trị
- District: Lệ Thủy
- Time zone: UTC+07:00

Lệ Ninh is a commune (xã) Quảng Trị Province, Vietnam. Local economy is mainly agricultural, rice production and cattle breeding. It is served by My Duc Railway Station on Hanoi–Saigon Railway, 26 km south of Đồng Hới Railway Station.

On June 16, 2025, the Standing Committee of the National Assembly issued Resolution No. 1680/NQ-UBTVQH15 on the reorganization of commune-level administrative units in Quảng Trị Province in 2025. Accordingly, Lệ Ninh Plantation Township, Sơn Thủy Commune, and Hoa Thủy Commune were merged to form a new commune named Lệ Ninh Commune.
