= Tân Mỹ, Quảng Trị =

Tân Mỹ
- Rural commune
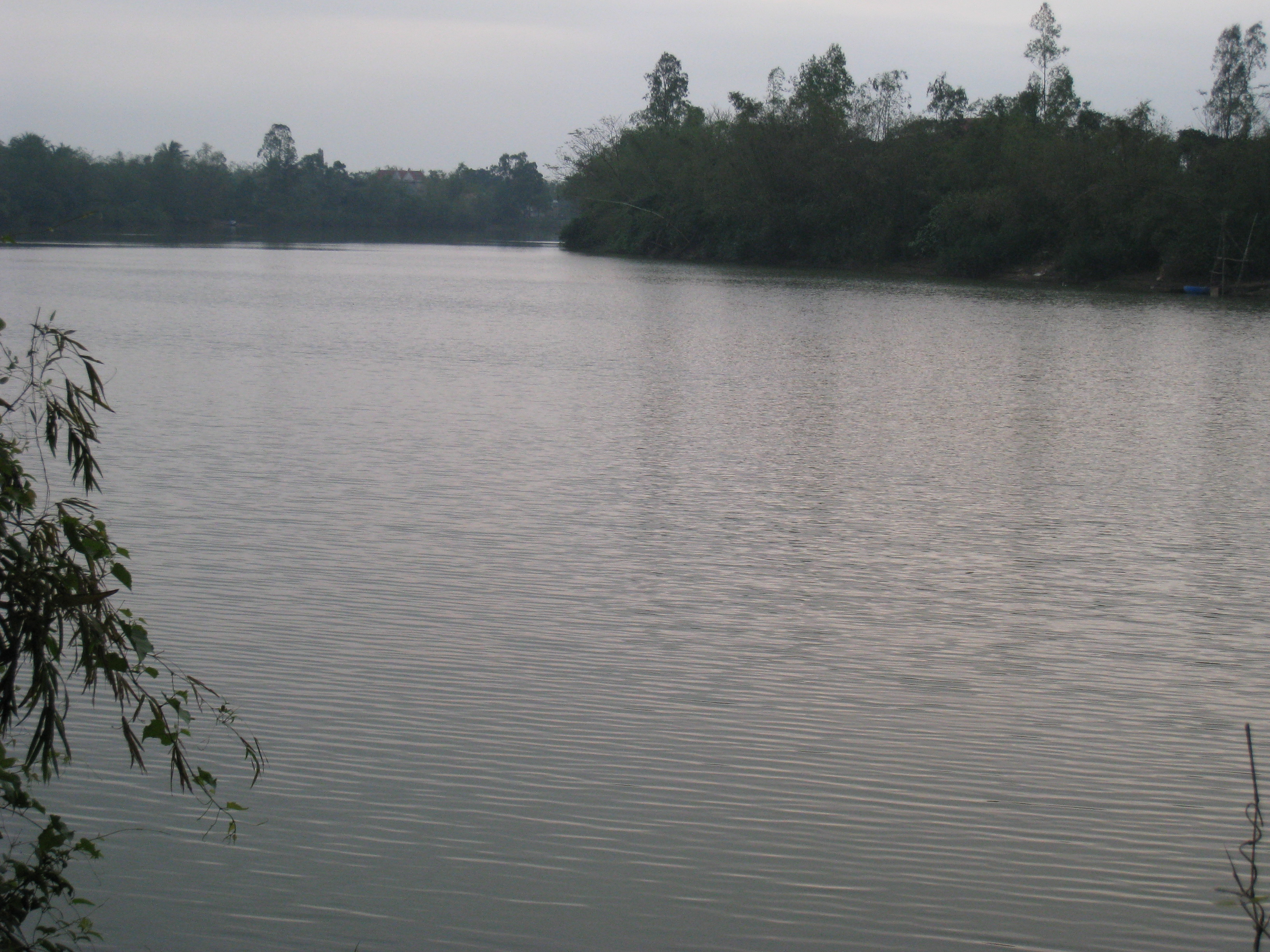
- Kiến Giang River in Tân Mỹ

- Location in Vietnam
- Coordinates: 17°12′0″N 106°49′45″E
- Country: Vietnam
- Province: Quảng Trị

Area
  - Land: 5.27 sq mi (13.64 km^{2})

Population (2009)
  - Total: 5,011
- Time zone: UTC+07:00 (Indochina Time)

Tân Mỹ a rural commune (xã) in Quảng Trị Province, North Central Coast region of Vietnam. This commune is located on the right bank of Kiến Giang River. The commune contains villages: Mỹ Trạch (where Mỹ Trạch Massacre was conducted by French army on 29 November 1947), My Ha, Thuan Trach, Mỹ Sơn. The commune governmental office is located in Mỹ Trạch village.

As of 2009, this commune has a population of 5,011 inhabitants, an area of 13.64 square kilometers. The Hanoi–Saigon Railway crosses this communes with a stop in Mỹ Trạch Railway Station, 40 km south of Đồng Hới Railway Station.

On June 16, 2025, the Standing Committee of the National Assembly issued Resolution No. 1680/NQ-UBTVQH15 on the reorganization of commune-level administrative units in Quảng Trị Province in 2025. Accordingly, Tân Thủy Commune, Dương Thủy Commune, Mỹ Thủy Commune, and Thái Thủy Commune were merged to form a new commune named Tân Mỹ Commune.

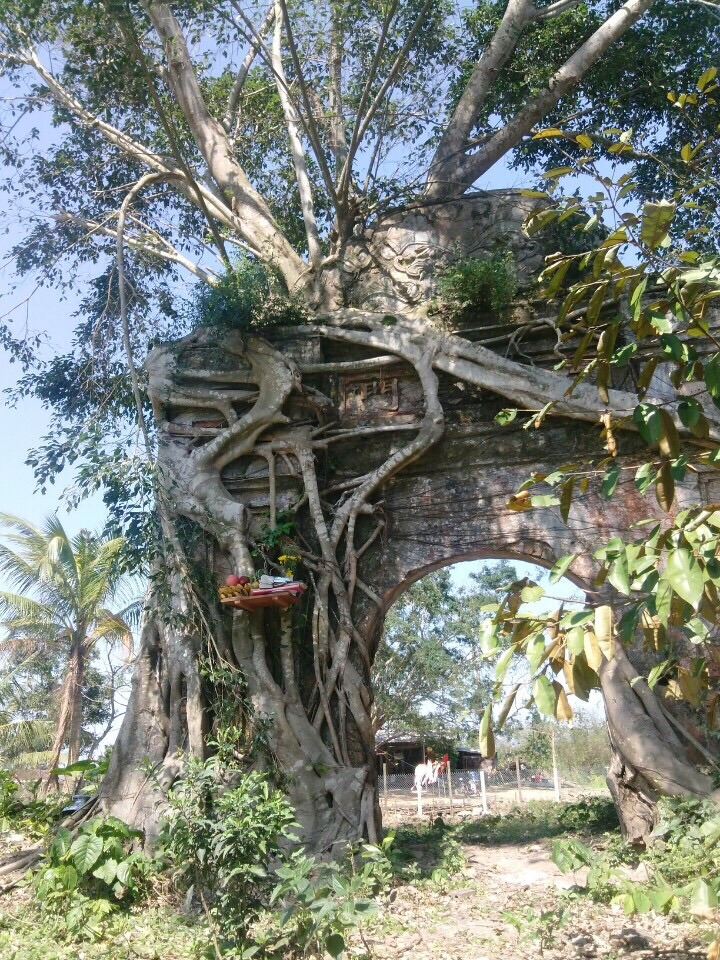
Hoang Phuc Pagoda in My Thuy
