= Thanh Thủy district =

Coordinates: 21°10′14″N 105°16′45″E

Thanh Thủy District Huyện Thanh Thủy
- District
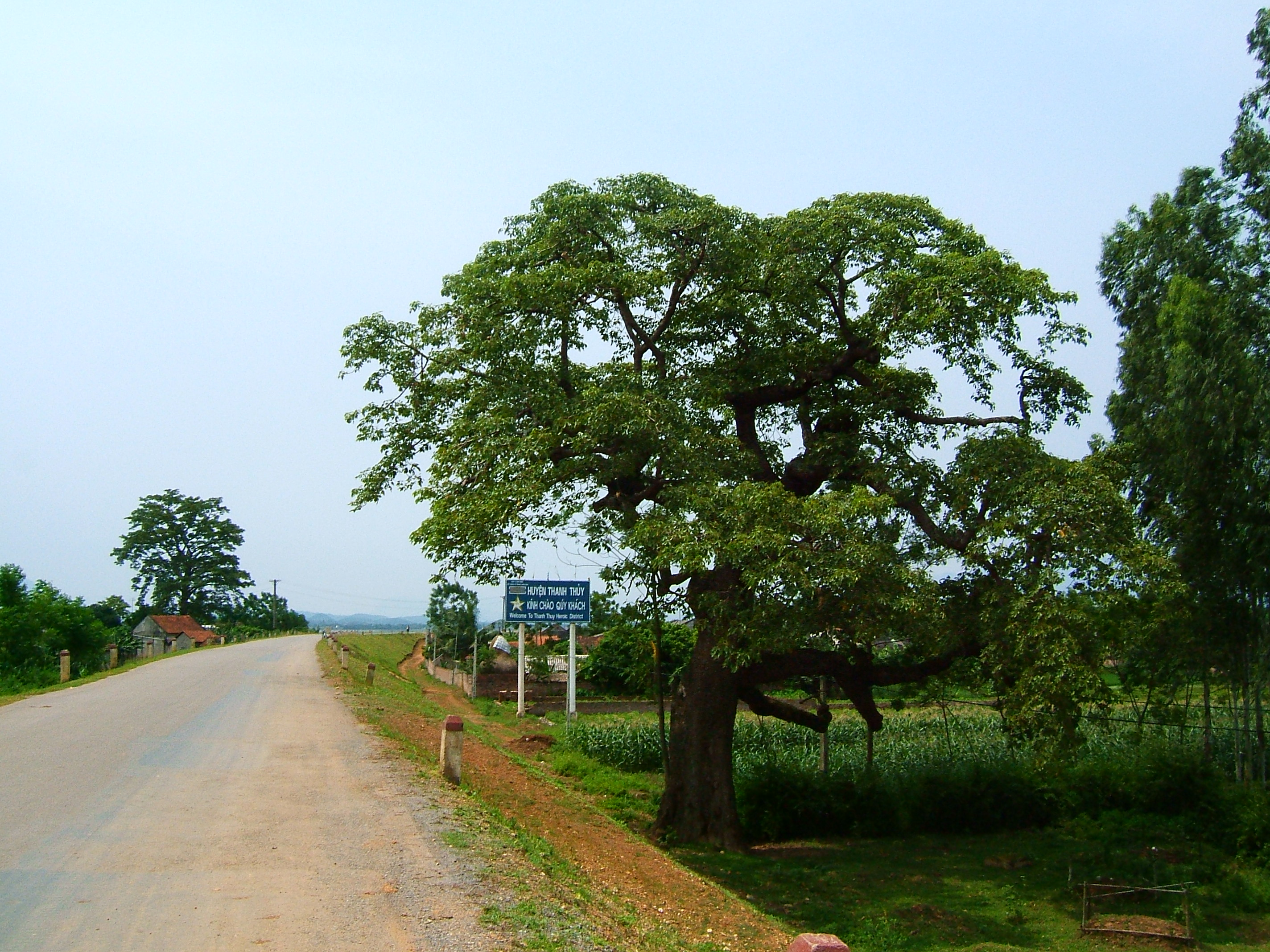
- Welcome Sign to Thanh Sơn, Phú Thọ, Vietnam
- Interactive map of Thanh Thủy District
- Country: Vietnam
- Region: Northeast
- Province: Phú Thọ
- Capital: Thanh Thủy

Area
  - Total: 48 sq mi (124 km^{2})

Population (2003)
  - Total: 76,330
- Time zone: UTC+7 (Indochina Time)

Thanh Thủy is a former rural district of Phú Thọ province in the Northeast region of Vietnam. As of 2003, the district had a population of 76,330. The district covers an area of 124 km^{2}. The district capital lies at Thanh Thủy.

== Administrative divisions ==
The district consists of the district capital, Thanh Thủy, and 14 communes: Xuân Lộc, Thạch Đồng, Tân Phương, Bảo Yên, Đoan Hạ, Sơn Thủy, Hoàng Xá, Trung Thịnh, Đồng Luận, Trung Nghĩa, Phượng Mao, Yến Mao, Tu Vũ and Đào Xá.
