= Mỹ Thủy =

- Rural commune
- Location in Vietnam
- Coordinates: 17°12′0″N 106°49′45″E
- Country: Vietnam
- Province: Quảng Trị

Area
  - Land: 5.27 sq mi (13.64 km^{2})

Population (2009)
  - Total: 5,011
- Time zone: UTC+07:00 (Indochina Time)

Mỹ Thủy is a rural commune (xã) in Quảng Trị Province, North Central Coast region of Vietnam.

On June 16, 2025, the Standing Committee of the National Assembly issued Resolution No. 1680/NQ-UBTVQH15 on the reorganization of commune-level administrative units in Quảng Trị Province in 2025. Accordingly, Hải Dương Commune, Hải An Commune, and Hải Khê Commune were merged to form a new commune named Mỹ Thủy Commune.
