= Trường Phú =

Coordinates: 20°33′N 105°53′E

- Commune and village
- Interactive map of Trường Phú
- Country: Vietnam
- Province: Quảng Trị
- Time zone: UTC+07:00

Trường Phú is a commune (xã) and village in Quảng Trị Province, in Vietnam.

On June 16, 2025, the Standing Committee of the National Assembly issued Resolution No. 1680/NQ-UBTVQH15 on the reorganization of commune-level administrative units in Quảng Trị Province in 2025. Accordingly, Trường Thủy Commune, Mai Thủy Commune, and Phú Thủy Commune were merged to form a new commune named Trường Phú Commune.
