= Cam Hồng =

- Commune and village
- Country: Vietnam
- Province: Quảng Trị

Area
  - Total: 33.93 sq mi (87.89 km^{2})

Population (2025)
  - Total: 26,663
  - Density: 785.7/sq mi (303.4/km^{2})
- Time zone: UTC+07:00

Cam Hồng is a commune (xã) and village in Quảng Trị Province, in Vietnam.

On June 16, 2025, the Standing Committee of the National Assembly issued Resolution No. 1680/NQ-UBTVQH15 on the reorganization of commune-level administrative units in Quảng Trị Province in 2025. Accordingly, the entire natural area and population of Cam Thủy Commune (Lệ Thủy District), Thanh Thủy Commune, Hồng Thủy Commune, and Ngư Thủy Bắc Commune were reorganized to form a new commune named Cam Hồng Commune.
