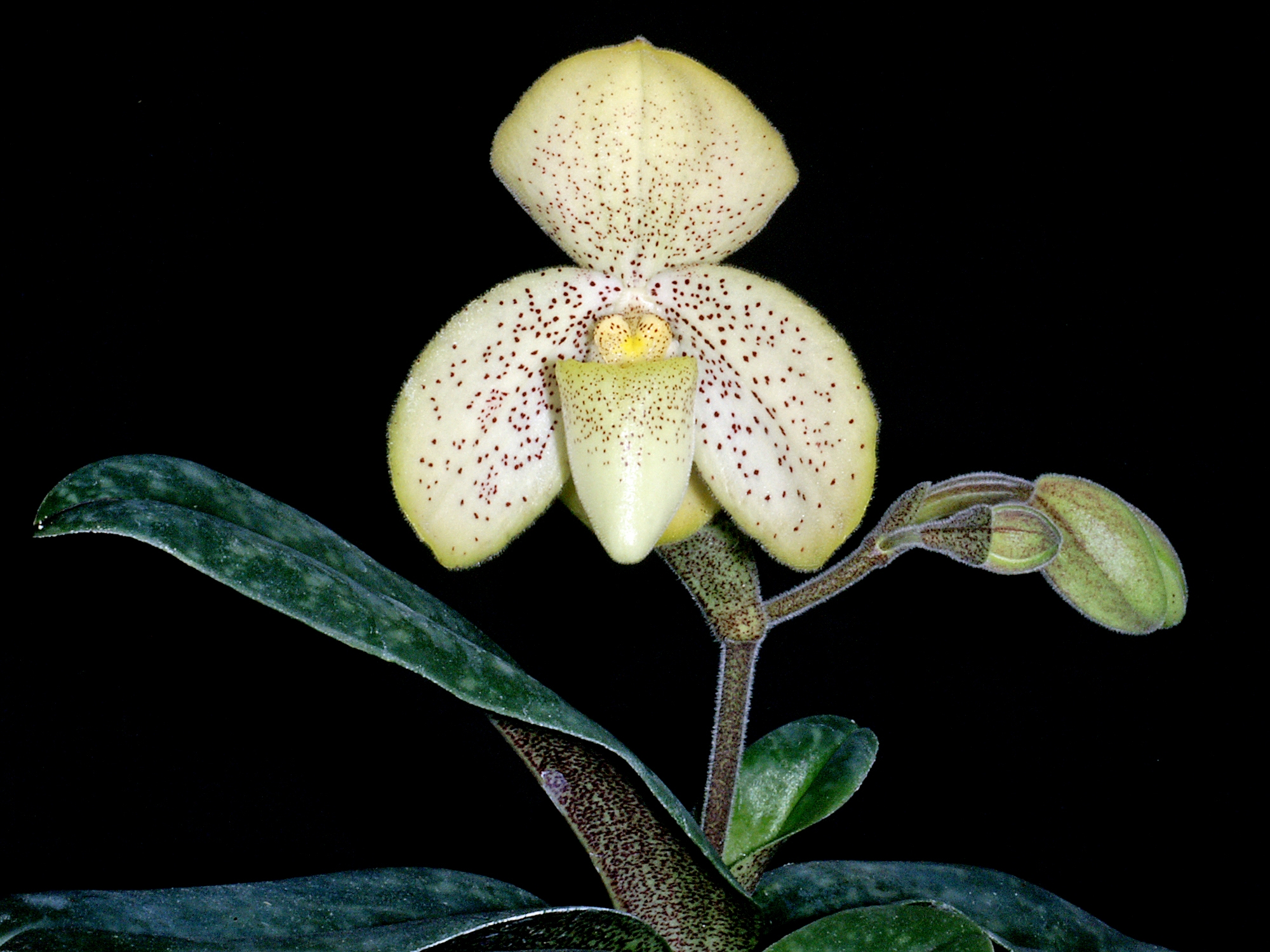
- Paphiopedilum concolor

Scientific classification
- Kingdom: Plantae
- Clade: Tracheophytes
- Clade: Angiosperms
- Clade: Monocots
- Order: Asparagales
- Family: Orchidaceae
- Subfamily: Cypripedioideae
- Genus: Paphiopedilum
- Subgenus: Paphiopedilum subg. Brachypetalum (Hallier) Pfitzer 1897

Type species
- Paphiopedilum concolor

Species
- See text

Synonyms
- Cypripedium sect. Concoloria Kraenzl.; Paphiopedilum sect. Brachypetalum Hallier; Paphiopedilum sect. Concoloria (Kraenzl.) V.A. Albert & Börge Pett.

= Paphiopedilum subg. Brachypetalum =

Subgenus of flowering plants

Paphiopedilum subgenus Brachypetalum is a subgenus of the genus Paphiopedilum.

== Distribution ==
Plants from this section are found from western China to Myanmar, Vietnam, Laos, Thailand, to Cambodia, Malaysia .

== Species ==
Paphiopedilum subgenus Brachypetalum comprises the following species:

Image	Name	Distribution	Elevation (m)
	Paphiopedilum bellatulum [Rchb.f]Stein 1895	China (Yunnan), Thailand, and Myanmar	340–1,600 metres (1,120–5,250 ft)
	Paphiopedilum concolor (Bateman) Pfitzer 1888	China (Yunnan, Guizhou, Guangxi), Myanmar (Burma), Laos, Thailand and Southern and Central Vietnam, usually in Phong Nha-Kẻ Bàng National Park in Quảng Bình Province.	0–1,060 metres (0–3,478 ft)
	Paphiopedilum godefroyae [Godefroy Lebeuf]Stein 1895	peninsular Thailand, Vietnam and Malaysia	3–25 metres (9.8–82.0 ft)
	Paphiopedilum myanmaricum Koopowitz, Iamwir. & S.Laohap. 2017	Myanmar	200–400 metres (660–1,310 ft)
	Paphiopedilum niveum [Rchb.f] Stein 1895	Thailand, Malaysia (Lang Kawi Islands)	9–60 metres (30–197 ft)
	Paphiopedilum thaianum Iamwir. 2006	Thailand	350–450 metres (1,150–1,480 ft)
	Paphiopedilum trungkienii (Aver., O.Gruss, C.X.Canh & N.H.Tuan) Aver., O.Gruss & Koop. 2019	Vietnam	500–600 metres (1,600–2,000 ft)
	Paphiopedilum wenshanense Z.J.Liu & J.Yong Zhang 2000	China (Yunnan)	1,000–1,200 metres (3,300–3,900 ft)
