= Lưu Trọng Lư =

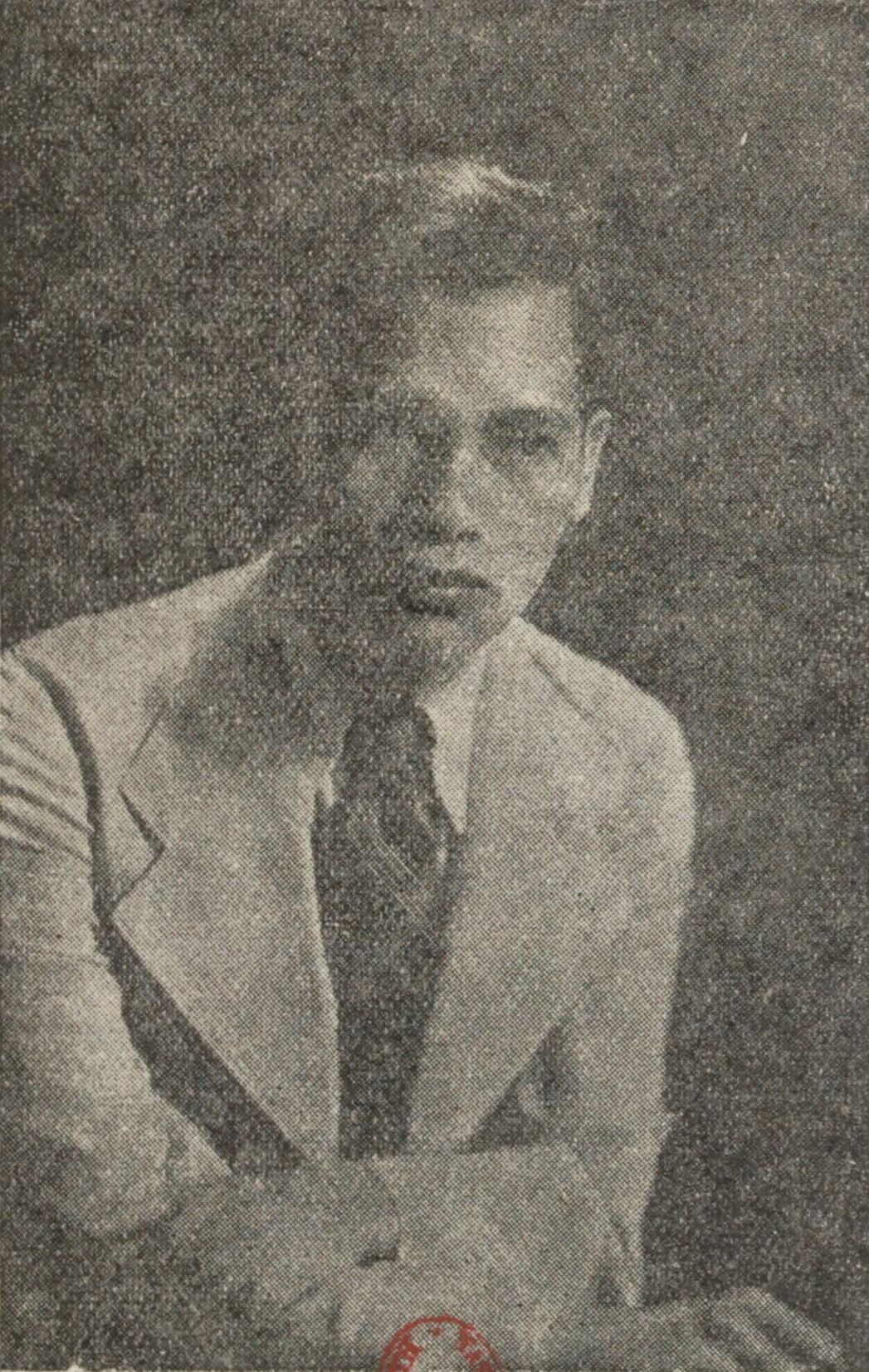
- Lưu Trọng Lư
- Born: 19 June 1911; Hạ Trạch, Bố Trạch District, Quảng Bình Province, Annam, French Indochina
- Died: August 10, 1991 (aged 80); Hanoi, Vietnam
- Occupations: Poet, playwright, novelist
- Writing career
- Notable works: Tiếng thu Nữ diễn viên miền Nam; Người sơn nhân

Lưu Trọng Lư (1911–1991) was a Vietnamese poet, play writer, and novelist. He was born in 1911 at Cao Lao Hạ village, Bố Trạch District, Quảng Bình Province, North Central Coast, Vietnam. He attended Quốc học Huế school, then moved to Hanoi to work as a writer and journalist. He wrote many famous poems such as "The Voices of Autumn" (Tiếng Thu). He was one of the founders of the New Poetry Movement (Phong trào Thơ mới) in Vietnam.
