= Bố Trạch district =

Coordinates: 17.417°N 106.250°E

Bố Trạch District Huyện Bố Trạch
- District
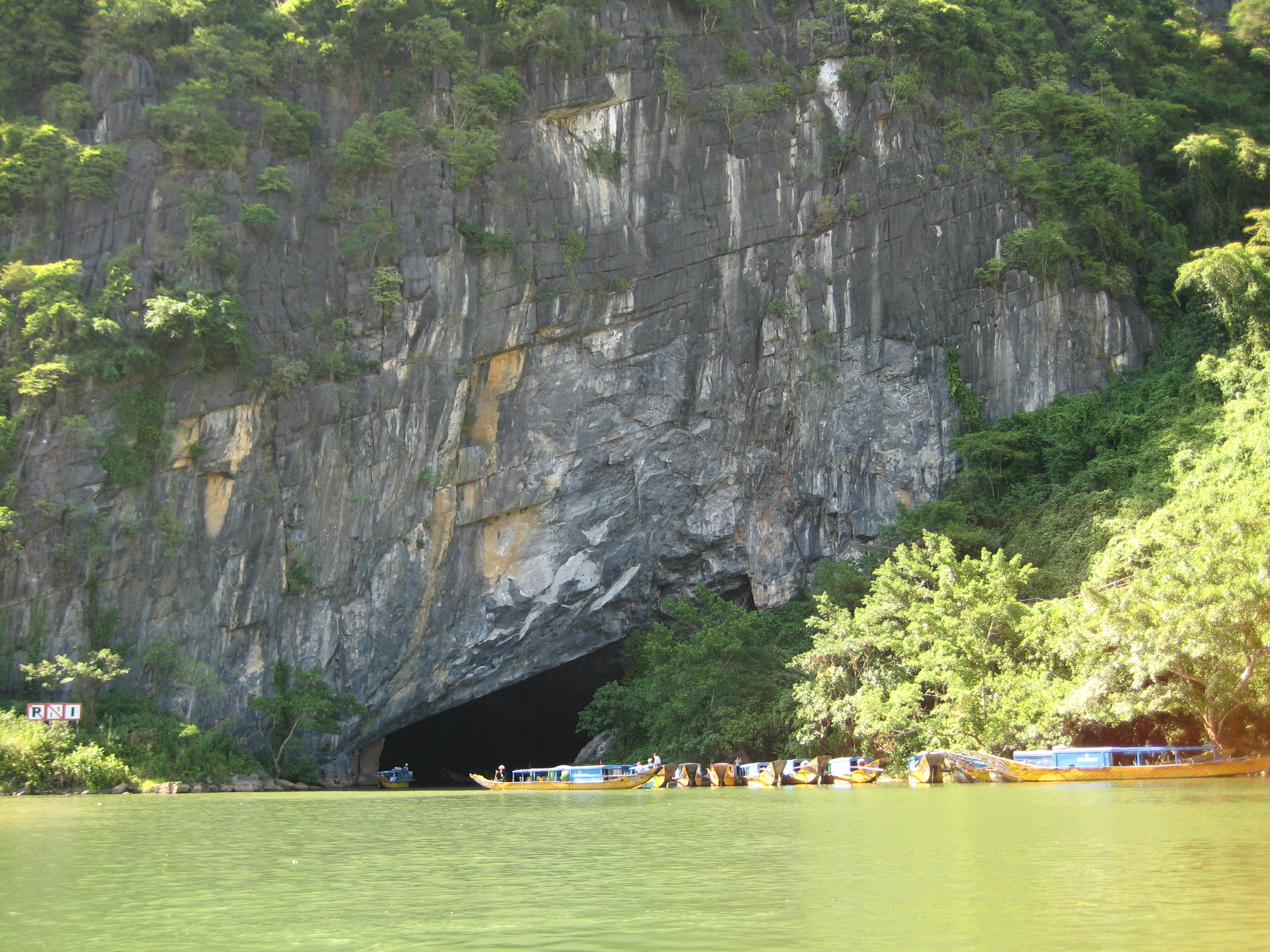
- Phong Nha-Kẻ Bàng National Park
- Interactive map of Bố Trạch District
- Country: Vietnam
- Region: North Central Coast
- Province: Quảng Bình
- Capital: Hoàn Lão

Area
  - District: 820 sq mi (2,123 km^{2})

Population (2024 census)
  - District: 288,375
  - Density: 351.8/sq mi (135.8/km^{2})
  - Urban: 28,673
- Time zone: UTC+7 (Indochina Time)

Bố Trạch is a rural district in Quảng Bình province. The district capital is Hoàn Lão township. Bố Trạch borders the capital city of Đồng Hới to the south-east, Tuyên Hóa district and Quảng Trạch district to the north, Quảng Ninh district to the south and Minh Hóa district to the north-west. Bố Trạch is home to Phong Nha-Kẻ Bàng National Park and has 30 communes and townships. As of 2019 the district had a population of 188,375. The district covers 2,123 km^{2} (820 mi^{2}).

== Administrative divisions ==
The district is divided into 3 townships: Hoàn Lão, Phong Nha and Nông trường Việt Trung, and 25 rural communes: Bắc Trạch, Cự Nẫm, Đại Trạch, Đồng Trạch, Đức Trạch, Hạ Trạch, Hải Phú, Hoà Trạch, Hưng Trạch, Lâm Trạch, Liên Trạch, Lý Trạch, Mỹ Trạch, Nam Trạch, Nhân Trạch, Phú Định, Phúc Trạch, Sơn Lộc, Tân Trạch, Tây Trạch, Thanh Trạch, Thượng Trạch, Trung Trạch, Vạn Trạch and Xuân Trạch.

Area and population of administrative units of Bố Trạch district (figures from annual census of Bố Trạch district of 2006)

Number	Name of administrative unit	Telephone (052)	Area (km^{2})	Population (people)
1	Hoàn Lão township	3862242	5.42	7,247
2	Việt Trung Farm township	3796007	86.00	9,506
3	Bắc Trạch rural commune (rc)	3866086	17.24	6,413
4	Cự Nẫm rc	3675552	32.79	7,562
5	Đại Trạch rc	3862161	24.80	9,043
6	Đồng Trạch rc	3864451	6.44	5,615
7	Đức Trạch rc	3864192	2.49	6,529
8	Hạ Trạch rc	3866406	17.83	4,721
9	Hải Trạch rc	3864218	1.97	8,707
10	Hoà Trạch rc	3862820	22.00	4,612
11	Hoàn Trạch rc	3862435	7.71	3,501
12	Hưng Trạch rc	3675051	95.12	10,959
13	Lâm Trạch rc	3679371	27.92	3,387
14	Liên Trạch rc	2212693	27.70	3,939
15	Lý Trạch rc	3862279	21.77	4,138
16	Mỹ Trạch rc	3866401	9.38	3,464
17	Nam Trạch rc	3862628	19.14	3,201
18	Nhân Trạch rc	3862134	2.44	9,028
19	Phú Định rc	2212309	153.58	2,653
20	Phú Trạch rc	3864211	13.18	3,988
21	Phúc Trạch rc	3679731	60.10	9,866
22	Sơn Lộc rc	3864549	11.72	212
23	Sơn Trạch rc	3675055	101.2	987
24	Tân Trạch rc	(099) 452001	362.81	228
25	Tây Trạch rc	3862760	27.30	4,979
26	Thanh Trạch rc	3655470	24.35	11,107
27	Thượng Trạch rc	(099) 452003	725.71	1,823
28	Trung Trạch rc	3862763	10.59	5,019
29	Vạn Trạch rc	3678324	27.43	6,662
30	Xuân Trạch rc	3679356	176.97	5,097
