= Phong Nha–Kẻ Bàng National Park =

UNESCO World Heritage Site in Vietnam

- IUCN category II (national park)
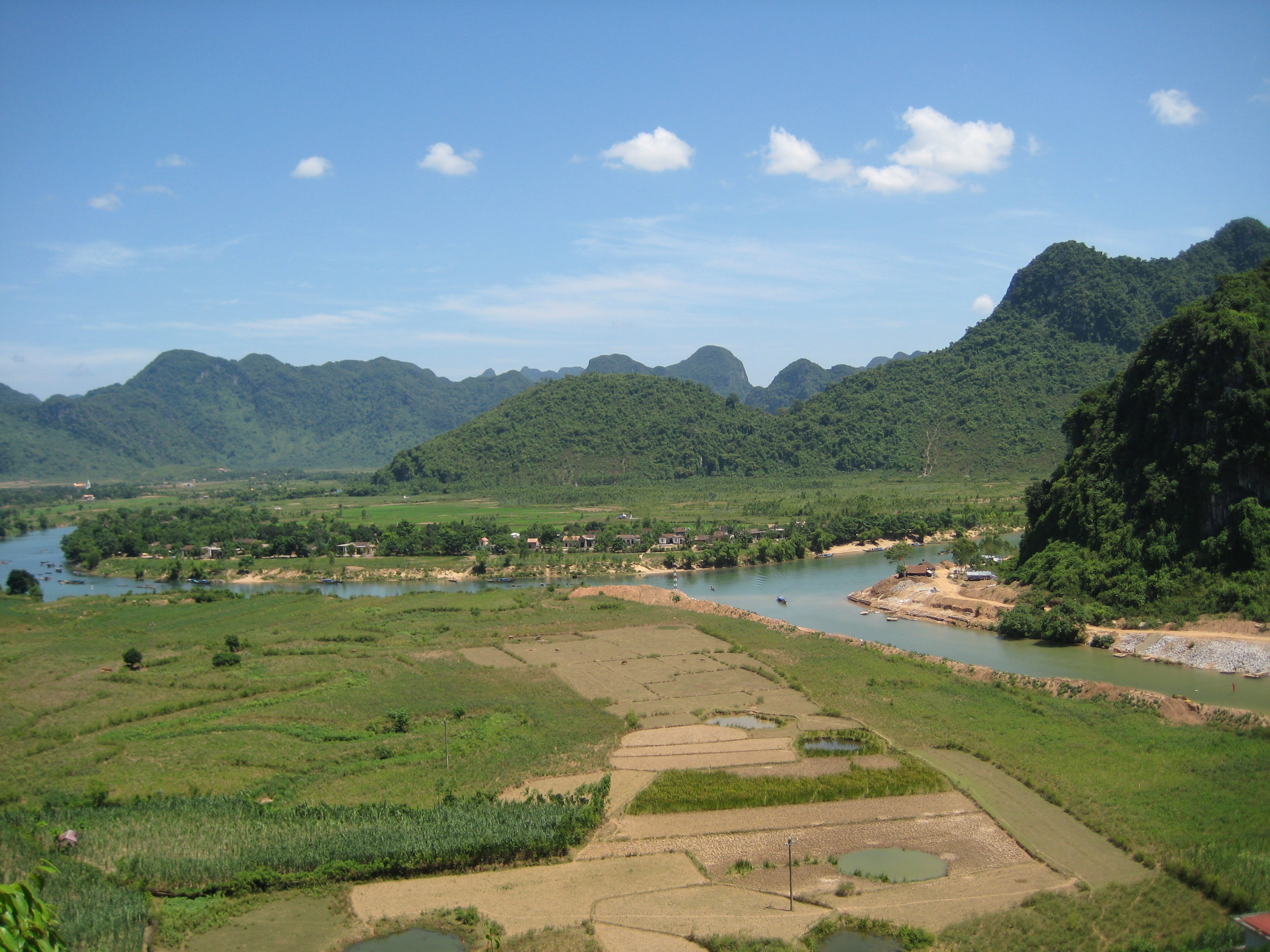
- View of Phong Nha–Kẻ Bàng National Park

- Location within Vietnam
- Location: Quảng Trị Province, North Central Coast
- Nearest city: Đồng Hới
- Coordinates: 17°32′14″N 106°9′5″E
- Area: 857.54 km^{2} (331.10 sq mi)
- Established: 2001
- Governing body: People's Committee of Quảng Trị Province
- Website: https://phongnhakebang.vn/home/

UNESCO World Heritage Site
- Part of: Phong Nha-Ke Bang National Park and Hin Nam No National Park
- Criteria: Natural: (viii), (ix), (x)
- Reference: 951bis
- Inscription: 2003 (27th Session)
- Extensions: 2015, 2025
- Area: 217,447 ha (839.57 sq mi)
- Buffer zone: 295,889 ha (1,142.43 sq mi)

Phong Nha–Kẻ Bàng (Vietnamese: Vườn quốc gia Phong Nha–Kẻ Bàng, Vietnamese pronunciation: [vɯ̀ən kʷǒk.ʑā fɔ̄ŋ.ɲā kɛ̂.ɓàŋ]) is a national park and UNESCO World Heritage Site in the Bố Trạch and Minh Hóa Commune of central Quảng Trị Province in the North Central Coast region of Vietnam, about 500 km south of Hanoi. The park borders the Hin Namno National Park in Khammouane Province, Laos to the west and 42 km east of the East Sea from its borderline point. Phong Nha–Kẻ Bàng National Park is in a limestone zone of 2,000 km^{2} in Vietnamese territory and borders another limestone zone of 2,000 km^{2} of Hin Namno in Laotian territory. The core zone of this national park covers 857.54 km^{2} and a buffer zone of 1,954 km^{2}.

The park was created to protect one of the world's two largest karst regions with 300 caves and grottoes and also protects the ecosystem of limestone forest of the Annamite Range region in North Central Coast of Vietnam.

Phong Nha–Kẻ Bàng is noted for its cave and grotto systems as it is composed of 300 caves and grottos. A 2009 survey brought the total discovered length of the cave system to about 126 km, with many areas still not well explored. Sơn Đoòng Cave, which was discovered in the 2009 survey by British and Vietnamese explorers, is considered the largest cave in the world. Even before this discovery, Phong Nha held several world cave records, including the longest river as well as the largest combined caverns and passageways.

The park derives its name from Phong Nha Cave, containing many rock formations, and Kẻ Bàng forest. The plateau on which the park rests is one of the finest and most distinctive examples of a complex karst landform in Southeast Asia. This national park was listed in UNESCO's World Heritage Sites in 2003 for its geological values as defined in its criteria viii. In April 2009, the world's largest cave was re-discovered by a team of British cave explorers of the British Caving Association led by a local farmer named Ho Khanh.

== History of exploration ==
Champa inscriptions carved on steles and Buddhist altars in the cave dating from the 9th century demonstrate that people had inhabited the cave long before the area was annexed by Vietnam in the Nam tiến or southward expansion. The cave was first mentioned in literature in 1550, appearing in Dương Văn An's works. This cave was depicted in 9 urns in the Citadel of the Nguyễn dynasty in Huế. In 1824, The cave was conferred the title "Diệu ứng chi thần" (妙應之神) by King Minh Mạng. It was also conferred by Nguyen kings as "Thần Hiển Linh" (神顯靈).

In the late 19th century, Léopold Michel Cadière, a French Roman Catholic priest, conducted an expedition to explore Phong Nha cave, where he discovered Champa scripts. He proclaimed Phong Nha cave "The number one cave of Indochina". In July 1924, an English expeditionist (surnamed Barton) stated that Phong Nha cave is second to none of famous caves of Padirac (France), Cuevas del Drach (Spain). In 1935, a local inhabitant accidentally discovered a beautiful cave 1 km from the mouth of Phong Nha cave, at an elevation of 200 meters (660 ft). It was called Tien Son cave (lit.: Fairy-tale cave), or Dry cave because its inside landscape is similar to fairy-tales and it has no underground river.

In 1937, the Bureau of Tourism of French Resident Superior (in Huế) issued a brochure to introduce tourism in Quảng Bình and Phong Nha Cave was included in this introduction. This tour site is ranked second in French Indochina. Before 1990, several explorations were conducted by Vietnamese and foreign groups but the mystery of this area still remained. From 1990 on, there marked a turning point in discovering activities, from exploration to research, thus full documents for submission to UNESCO for World Natural Heritage nomination were made available.

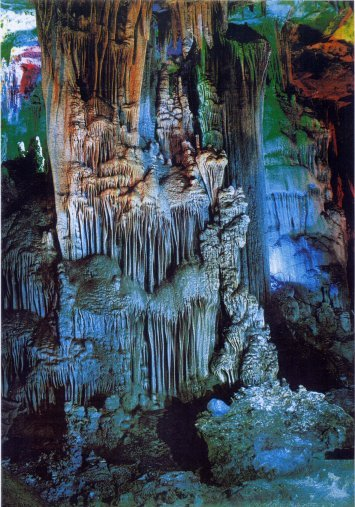
Inside Tien Son cave

IN 1990, for the first time, Hanoi University accepted the cooperation proposal of the British Cave Research Association. They combined efforts in exploring and researching caves and grottoes in the area comprehensively. The first exploration was conducted in 1990 by a group from the British Cave Research Association and Faculty for Geology and Geography of Hanoi University, led by Howard Limbert. They completed research of a large part of Vom Cave. In 1992, the second exploration was conducted by a group of 12 British scientists, six professors from Hanoi University. This time, this group completed their exploration of 7,729 m of Phong Nha Cave and 13,690 m of Vom Cave and adjacent caves and grottos. In 1994, a third exploration was carried out by a group of 11 British scientists and five Vietnamese professors of Hanoi University. In 1999 scientists from the Vietnam-Russia Tropical Centre also conducted zoological and botanical surveys in the Kẻ Bàng area. Based on the results of these three explorations, more information about the caves and grottoes made available to the Vietnamese and local government for the protection, planning, and tourism development of this park.

In 2005, scientists from the British Cave Research Association discovered a new cave and named it Paradise Cave (động Thiên Đường). The newly discovered cave was acclaimed by the British scientists as "the largest and the most beautiful cave in Phong Nha–Kẻ Bàng area".

On June 1, 2006, the Ministry of Culture and Information of Vietnam issued a stamp collection of depicting various landscapes found in Phong Nha–Kẻ Bàng.

In April 2009, a group of cave explorers from British Caving Association conducted survey in this park and adjacent areas. The biggest chamber of Sơn Đoòng is more than five (5) kilometers in length, 200 meters high and 150 meters wide. With these dimensions, Sơn Đoòng overtakes Deer Cave in Malaysia to take the title of the world's largest cave. At the same time they found new caves and grottoes in the park and adjacent area. In this survey, the cave British explorers discovered 20 new caves with total length of 56 km, including world's largest cave, Sơn Đoòng.

== Geography ==
=== Location ===
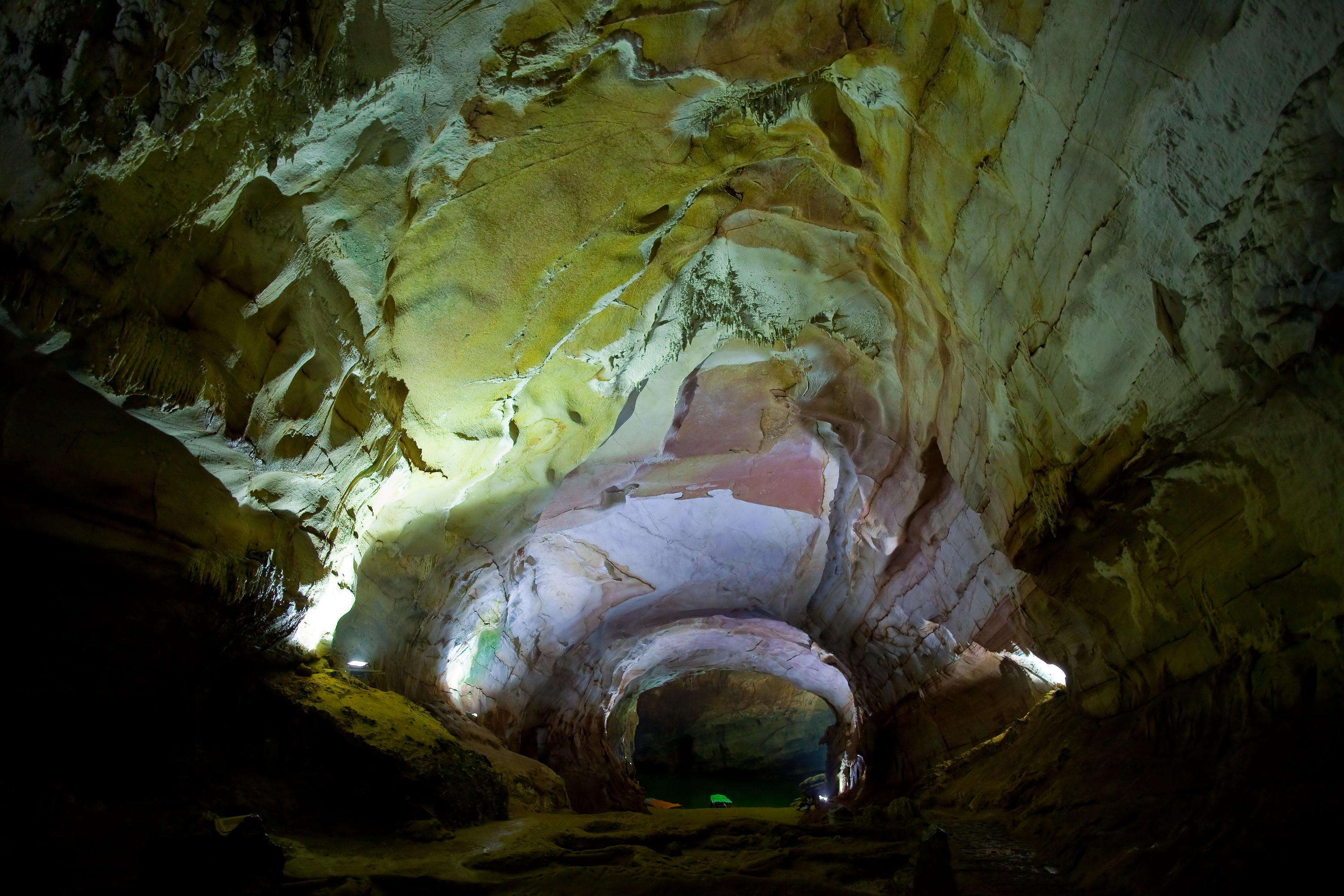
Inside Phong Nha Cave

Phong Nha–Kẻ Bàng National Park is in the territories of communes (Vietnamese: xã): Tan Trach, Thuong Trach, Phuc Trach, Xuan Trach and Son Trach of Bố Trạch District and a small part of Minh Hóa District in the center of Quảng Bình Province, around 40 km north-west of the provincial capital city of Đồng Hới. The park is bordered by the Hin Namno karst area of Khammouane Province of Laos in the west. Road distances are about 500 km south of the capital Hanoi and 260 km north of the port city of Đà Nẵng. The geographical coordinates are 17°32′14″N 106°9′5″E.

The park is around 30 km west of the South China Sea and National Route 1, near Hồ Chí Minh Highway and 28 km west of the Hanoi–Saigon Railway, and is accessible by road or waterway through an estuary in the South China Sea. There is a small airport near the park accessible by helicopter or small aircraft (Khe Gat Airbase), an airbase used by the North Vietnamese Air Force during the Vietnam War, notably in the Battle of Đồng Hới.

=== Park layout ===
Before becoming a national park, this area had been a nature reserve. The Phong Nha Nature Reserve with an area of 50 km^{2} was officially declared by the Vietnamese government on 9 August 1986 and was extended to 411.32 km^{2} by 1991. On 12 December 2001, the Vietnamese Prime Minister by Decision 189/2001 189/2001/QĐ-TTG turning then a nature reserve into a national park. The purpose of this protected area is to protect forest resources, biodiversity within the boundary of this national park and to preserve scientific values of fauna and flora in Bắc Trung Bộ region, especially rare species native to this region. The park covers a total area of 857.54 km^{2} which are divided into three zones, a "strictly protected zone" (648.94 km^{2}), an "ecological recovery zone" (174.49 km^{2}), and an "administrative service zone" (34.11 km^{2}).

=== Climate ===
Like North Central Coast in general, and Quảng Bình Province in particular, the climate in Phong Nha–Kẻ Bàng national park is tropically hot and humid. The annual mean temperature is 23–25 °C (73–77 °F), with a maximum of 41 °C (106 °F) in the summer and a minimum of 6 °C (43 °F) in the winter. The hottest months in this region fall from June to August, with an average temperature of 28 °C (82 °F), and the coldest months from December to February with an average temperature of 18 °C (64 °F). Annual rainfall is about 2,000 to 2,500 mm (79 to 98 in). 88% of the rainfall falls during the monsoon, from July to December, however, there is more than 160 rainy days per year, and some rain still falls throughout the dry season. Mean annual relative humidity is 84%.

== Geology ==
=== History of formation ===
The Phong Nha–Kẻ Bàng karst has evolved since the Paleozoic (some 400 million years ago), making it the oldest major karst area in Asia. It has been subject to massive tectonic changes, and comprises a multitude of rock types that are interbedded in complex ways. As many as seven different major levels of karst development have occurred as a result of tectonic uplift and changing sea levels, thus the karst landscape of PNKB is extremely complex with high geodiversity and many geomorphic features of considerable significance. There is also strong evidence that sulphurous solution and hydrothermal action have played an important role in shaping the broad-scale landscape and the caves, though this has not yet been properly assessed. The Phong Nha–Kẻ Bàng area today is the result of five stages of Earth's crust development and movement:

- Late Ordovician – Early Silurian Stage (about 450 Ma)
- Middle-late Devonian Stage (about 340 Ma)
- Carboniferous-Permian (about 300 Ma)
- Mesozoic Orogenic stage
- Cenozoic stage.

=== Geological significance ===
Phong Nha–Kẻ Bàng National Park is one of the world's two largest limestone regions. In comparison with 41 other world heritage sites which have karsts, Phong Nha has dissimilar geomorphic, geologic and biotic conditions. The karsts of Phong Nha can be traced back to Palaeozoic era, 400 million years ago. This makes Phong Nha the oldest major karst in Asia. If the Hin Namno, bordering Phong Nha on the west (in Laotian territory) was to be combined with the national park in a continuous reserve, the combined reserve would be the largest surviving karst forest in southeastern Asia (317,754 ha).

In general, there are two groups of landforms in the Phong Nha–Kẻ Bàng area, namely non-karstic and karstic landforms. Non-karstic landforms includes three types: The middle and low dome-block mountains developed in intrusive magmatic massifs; The middle denudation-structural mountain belts developed in terrigenous rocks of Cretaceous age; and The low block-denudational mountain belts developed in other terrigenous rocks. Karstic landforms in this area are of typical tropical karst which are divided into two groups of forms: The karstic forms on the surface including cone and tower karst, karrens, valleys and dolines, border polje, etc.; The underground karst consisting of caves.

In comparison with three other national parks listed in UNESCO's World Heritage Sites in Southeast Asia, namely Gunung Mulu National Park in Malaysia, Puerto Princesa Subterranean River National Park in Palawan of the Philippines and Lorentz National Park in West Irian of Indonesia and some other karst regions in Thailand, China, Papua New Guinea, karst in Phong Nha–Kẻ Bàng is older, has more complicated geological structure; diverse and complex underground rivers.

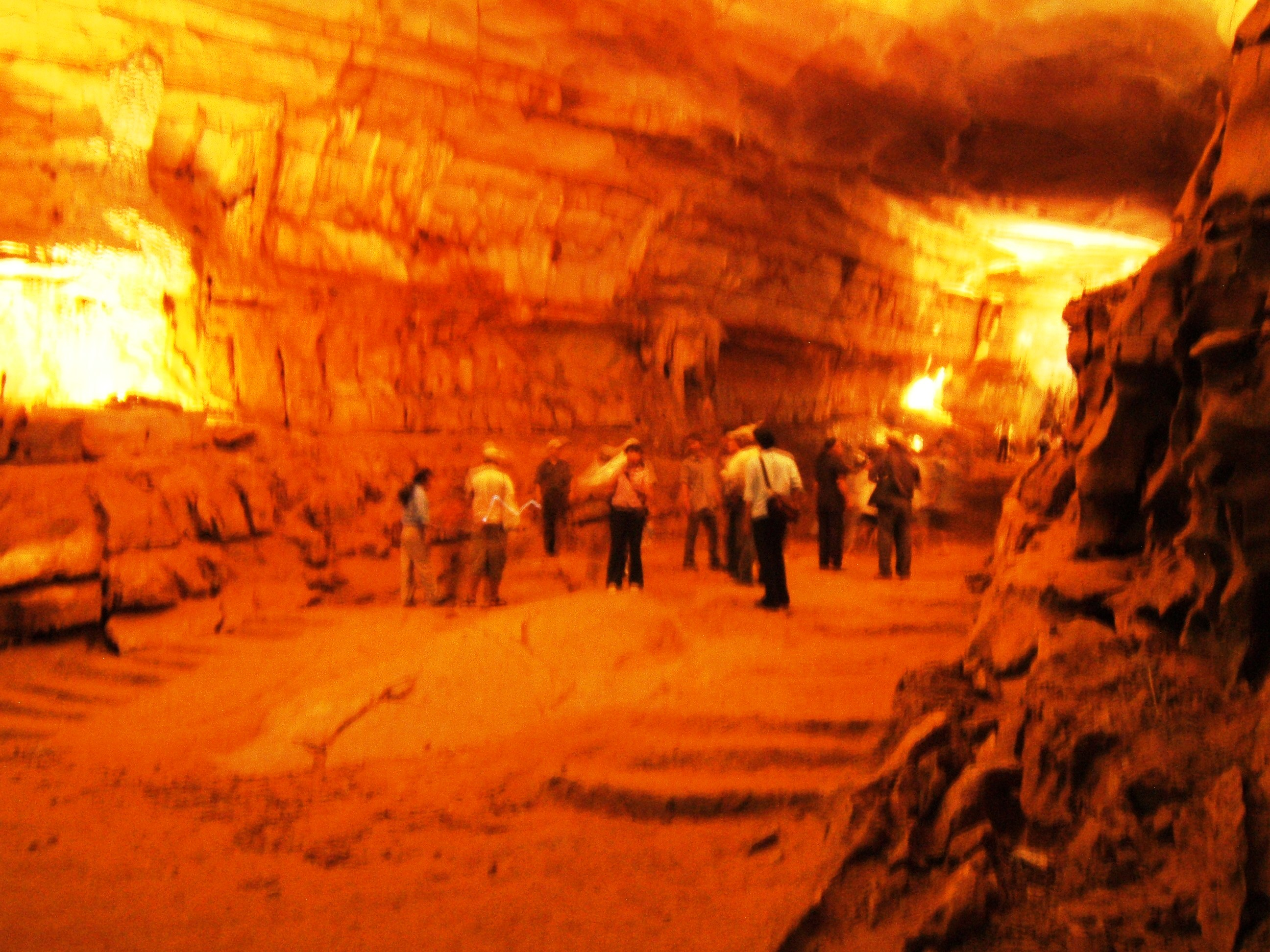
Chamber inside Phong Nha Cave

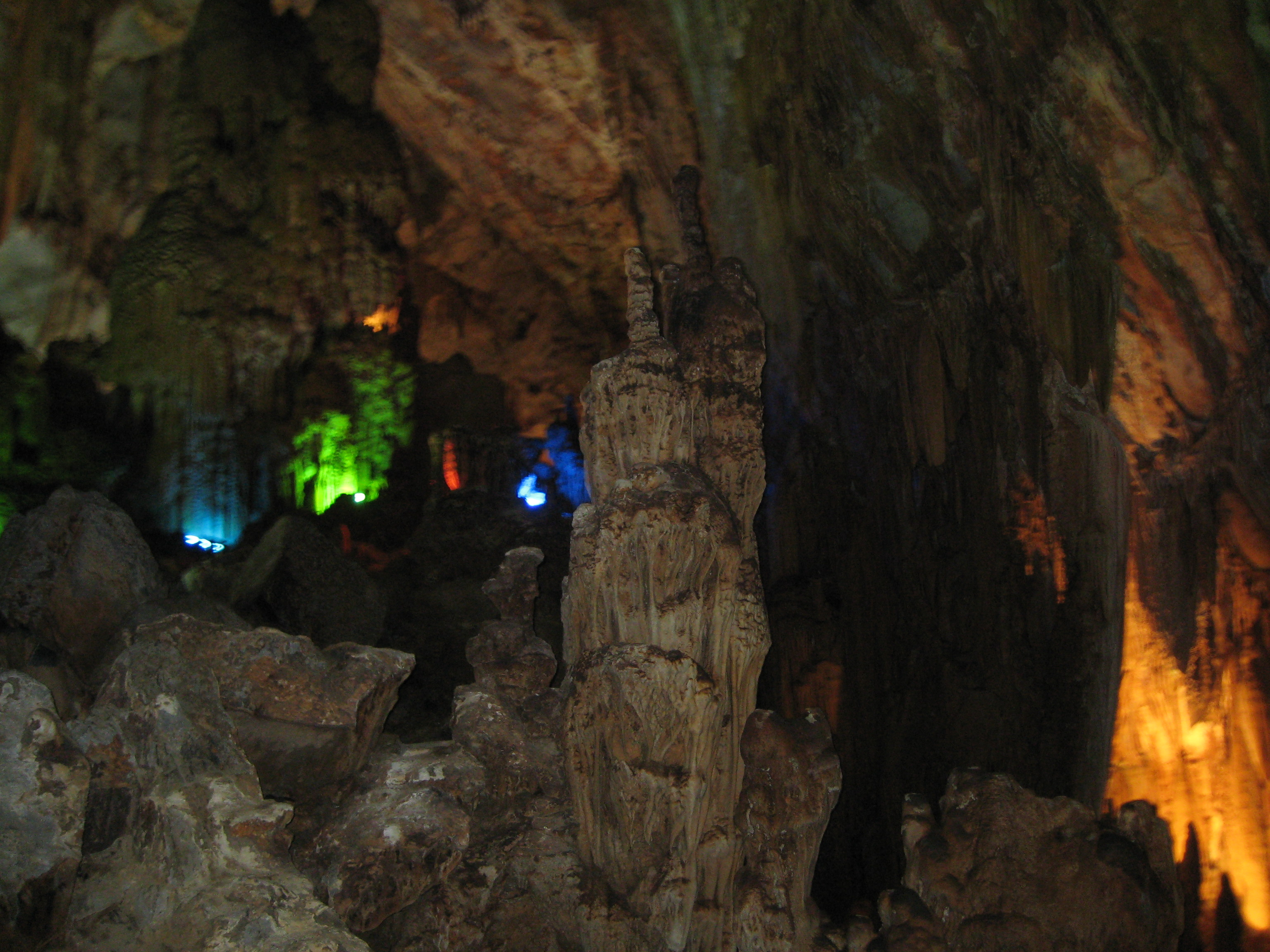
A scene inside Phong Nha Cave

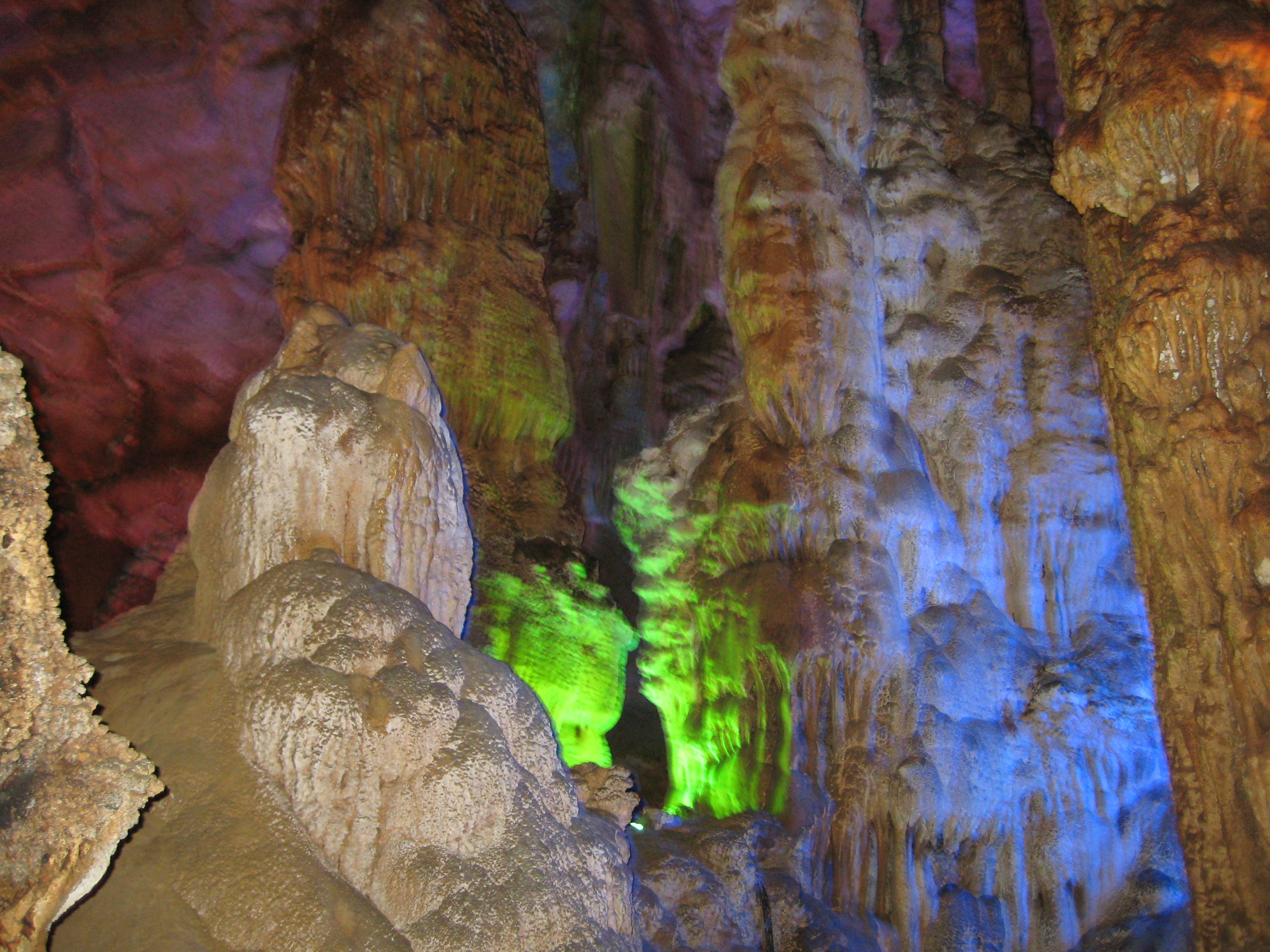
Stalagmite in a cave in Phong Nha–Kẻ Bàng National Park

=== Mounts and summits ===
Phong Nha–Kẻ Bàng contains two dozens of mountain peaks with over 1,000 metres in height. Noteworthy peaks are the Peak Co Rilata with a height of 1,128 m and the Peak Co Preu with a height of 1,213 m. Mounts in karstic area of the park rise at typical height of above 800 m constitute a continuous range along Laotian-Vietnamese borderline, of which notable summits above 1000 m are: Phu Tạo (1174 m), Co Unet (1150 m), Phu Canh (1095 m), Phu Mun (1078 m), Phu Tu En (1078 m), Phu On Chinh (1068 m), Phu Dung (1064 m), Phu Tu Ôc (1053 m), Phu Long (1015 m), Phu Ôc (1015 m), Phu Dong (1002 m). Inserting into these summits are 800–1000 m high summits of Phu Sinh (965 m), Phu Co Tri (949 m), Phu On Boi (933 m), Phu Tu (956 m), Phu Toan (905 m), Phu Phong (902 m) and núi Ma Ma (835 m).

Non-karstic topographical area accounts for a low percentage, distributing mainly in outer circle of limestone in the north, northeast and southeast of this national park. The height of these summits varies from 500 to 1000 m with the deep divisions and high sloping level from 25 to 30°. There are some narrow valleys along streams such as Am creek, Cha Lo creek, Chua Ngút creek and a valley along Rao Thuong river in the southernmost edge. In the north–south direction, there exists notable summits: Phu Toc Vu (1000 m), Mã Tác (1068 m), Cổ Khu (886 m), U Bò (1009 m), Co Rilata (1128 m); The highest summit in the non-karstic area and also the highest summit of this national park is Co Preu (1213 m), a summit in the southernmost edge of the park.

=== Rivers and streams ===
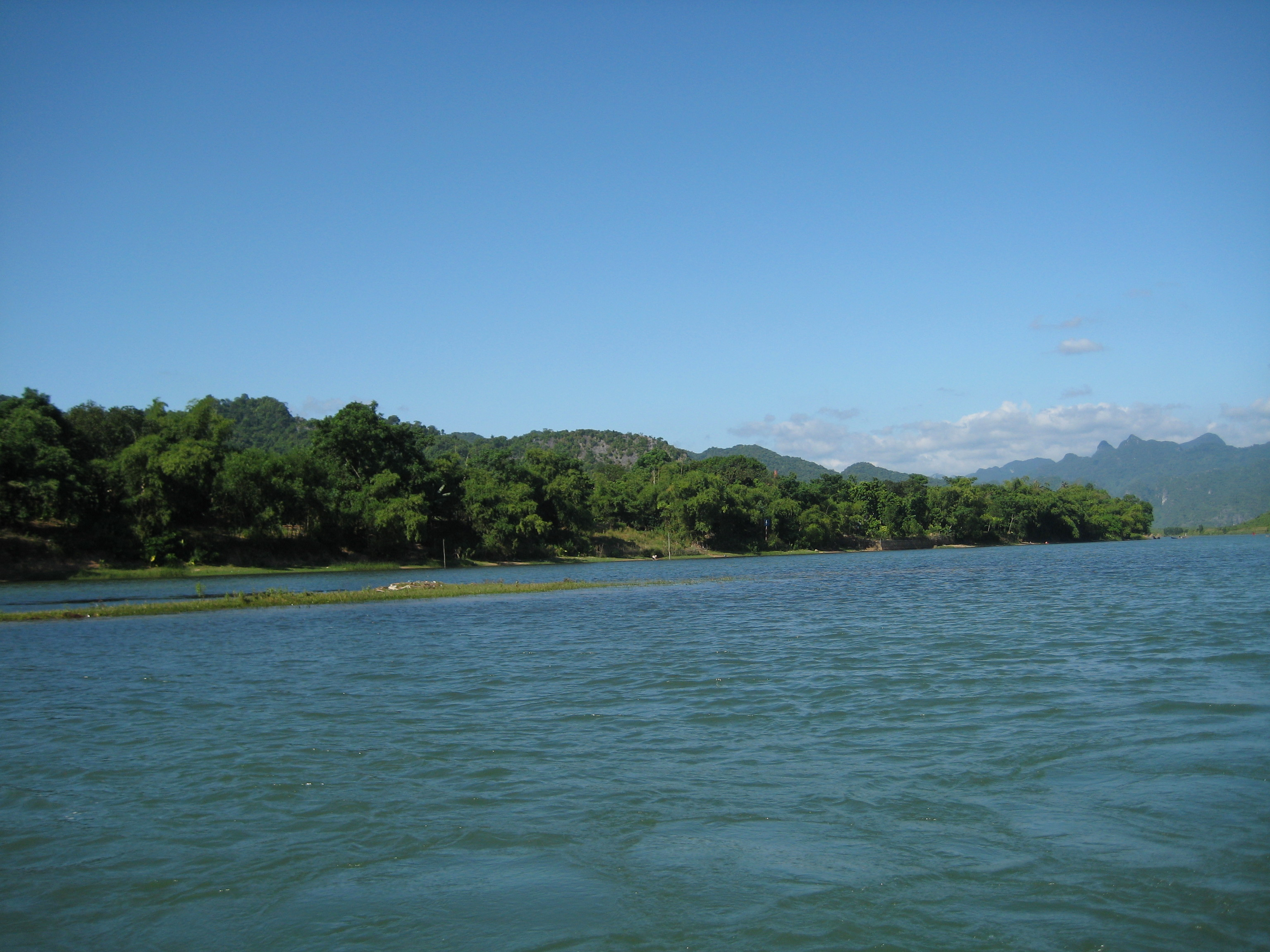
Son River in the Phong Nha–Kẻ Bàng National Park

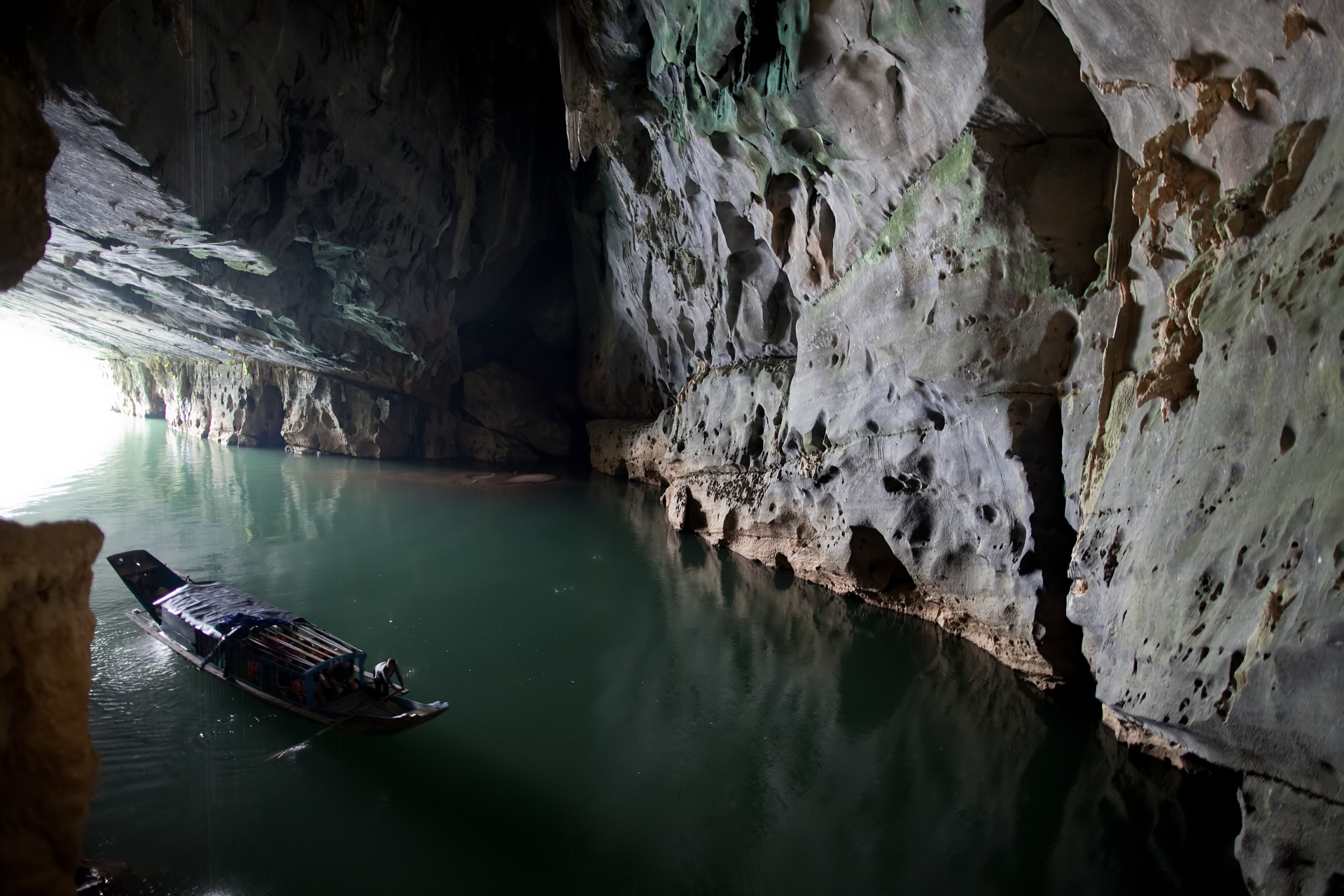
Underground river in Phong Nha cave

Besides the grotto and cave systems, Phong Nha has the longest underground river. The Sơn and Chay are the main rivers in this national park. Most of caves here have been shaped by Son and Chay Rivers. The Son River flows into the mouth of the Phong Nha cave and keeps on underground, where it is called the Nam Aki River. It emerges 20 km to the south near Pu-Pha-Dam Mountain. There are spectacular streams, springs and waterfalls in Phong Nha–Kẻ Bàng, namely: Gió waterfall, Madame Loan waterfall, Mọc stream erupting from a limestone mount range, and Trạ Ang stream.

== Cave and grottos ==
Phong Nha–Kẻ Bàng is home to the largest cave in the world and covers 300 different grottoes and caves. Before Sơn Đoòng Cave was found, Phong Nha Cave was regarded by British Caving Association as the top cave in the world due to its top four records: the longest underground river, the highest and longest cave, broadest and most beautiful fine sand beaches inside the caves, and the most spectacular stalagmites and stalactites. In the survey conducted in April 2009, the British cave explorers discovered 20 new caves with total length of 56 km, including world's largest cave Son Doong. According to the assessment of UNESCO, "The karst formation of Phong Nha–Kẻ Bàng National Park has evolved since the Palaeozoic (some 400 million years ago) and so is the oldest major karst area in Asia" and "Phong Nha displays an impressive amount of evidence of earth's history. It is a site of very great importance for increasing our understanding of the geologic, geomorphic and geo-chronological history of the region."

=== Etymology ===
The name Phong Nha–Kẻ Bàng is composed of Phong Nha (cave) and Kẻ Bàng (limestone forest). Phong Nha is widely explained as originating from Hán Nôm 风 牙, which means wind-tooth (wind flowing from the cave and stalactites and stalagmites inside the cave looking like teeth).

Another possibility is that Phong Nha, unrelated to the meanings wind and teeth, was the former name of a nearby village.

A third hypothesis suggests that Phong Nha derived its name from the imagination that mounts in this region standing in line looks similar to the scene of mandarins in front of the king in royal courts, therefore, it was named Phong Nha. Phong (峰) means "summit" and nha (衙) means "mandarin".

Other names for the Phong Nha cave include: Thầy Tiên cave, Thầy Mount, and Troóc cave.

=== The Phong Nha Cave ===
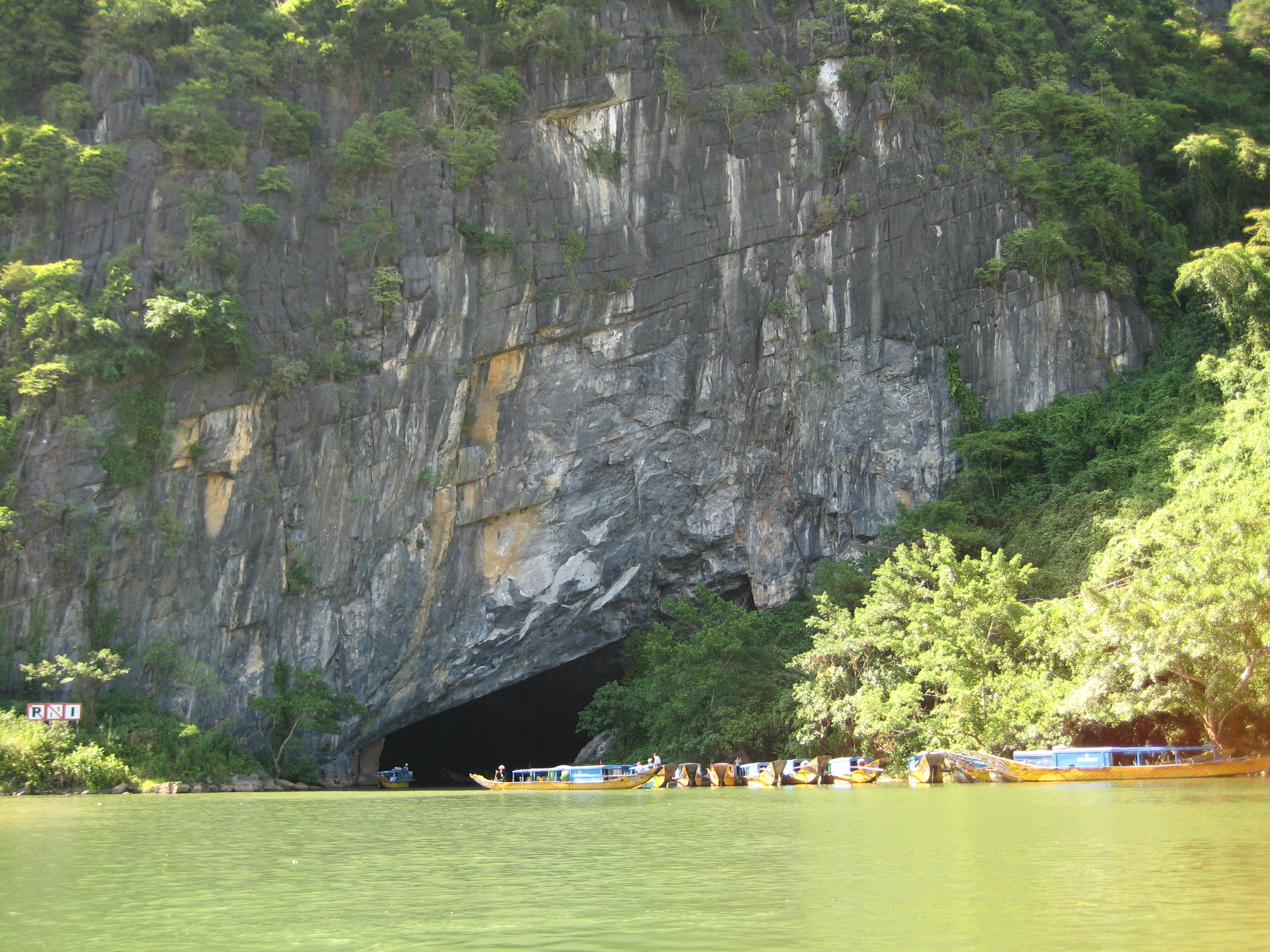
The mouth of Phong Nha cave with underground river

This cave, from which the name to the whole system and the park is derived, is famous for its rock formations which have been given names such as the "Lion", the "Fairy Caves", the "Royal Court", and the "Buddha". This cave is 7729 m long, contains 14 grottos, with a 13,969 m-long underground river. The scientists have surveyed 44.5 km of grottos in this cave so far, but tourists can only penetrate to a distance of 1500 m.

Phong Nha Cave, like most of the caves in this area, has been continuously shaped by the Chay River. As one gets farther into the cave, the more illusory the stalactites and stalagmites look as they glitter when bright light is shone on them. The Son River flows into the mouth of the cave and keeps flowing underground, where it is referred to as the Nam Aki River, then this river emerges at a site 20 km to the south near Pu Pha Dam Mountain. The main Phong Nha cave includes 14 chambers, connected by an underwater river that runs for 1.5 km. Secondary corridors branch off in all directions. The Outer Cave and some of the Inner Caves have roofs that tower between 25 and 40 meters above the water level. From the 14th chamber there may be other corridors leading to similarly large chambers, but this area proves more dangerous for explorers because of the ongoing erosion of the limestone of the cavern. The Shallow Cave is located 800 meters from the cave mouth, where there is a spectacular landscape of sand and rock. Stalactites and stalagmites jut out like strange trees, exciting visitor's imaginations.

Notable caves and grottoes in the Phong Nha Cave system include:

- Dark Grotto (Hang Tối): located upstream of Son River running to the branch of Chay River on the left. This cave is 5,258 m long and with a height of 83 m. The entry is high and wide with heavy forest around the cave mouth
- E Grotto (Hang E): a 736 m-long grotto accessible by the Hồ Chí Minh trail
- Cha An Grotto (Hang Chà An): a 667 m-long grotto, with the width of 15 meters
- Thung Grotto (Hang Thung): This grotto has an underground river of 3351 m, with the height in some part exceed 133. This river receives water resources from Rao Thuong
- En Grotto (Hang Én): a 1645 m long, 78.6 m high grotto
- Khe Tien Grotto (Hang Khe Tiên): located south of Phong Nha, this grotto is 520 m long.
- Khe Ry Grotto (Hang Khe Ry): located south of Phong Nha. The grotto is where the long Khe Ry stream (13.817 km or 8.585 miles) runs out
- Khe Thi Grotto (Hang Khe Thi): a stream originating from the mountain, running underground the grotto

=== Vòm Cave systems ===
- Vom Grotto (Hang Vòm): a 15.05 km-long, 145 m-high grotto with several underground rivers, pools. This grotto features several spectacular stalagmite and stalactites. In the recent exploring of British Cave Research Association, the scientists have found an abyss in Vom Grotto named Tang hole with the deep of over 255 m. This hole is the deepest hole in Vietnam.
- Dai Cao Grotto (Hang Đai Cao): this grotto is a connection of Vom Grotto. This grotto is 1645 m long, 28 m high..
- Duot Grotto (Hang Duột): This is a connection of Dai Cao Grotto with the length of 3.927 km and height of 45 m. There are some fine sand fields inside.
- Ca Grotto (Hang Cá): a 1,500 m-long, 62 m-high grotto.
- Ho Grotto (Hang Hổ): A connection of Ca Grotto with the length of 1,616 m and the height of 46 m
- Over Grotto (Hang Over): a 3,244 m long, 103 m high grotto, with the width from 30 to 50 m.
- Pygmy Grotto (Hang Pygmy): This 845 m-long grotto has several streams falling from mounts.
- Ruc Caroong Grotto (Hang Rục Caroòng): This the habitat of Arem ethnic group. They live in the caves, grottos and on hunting, harvesting natural products.

=== Tiên Sơn Cave ===
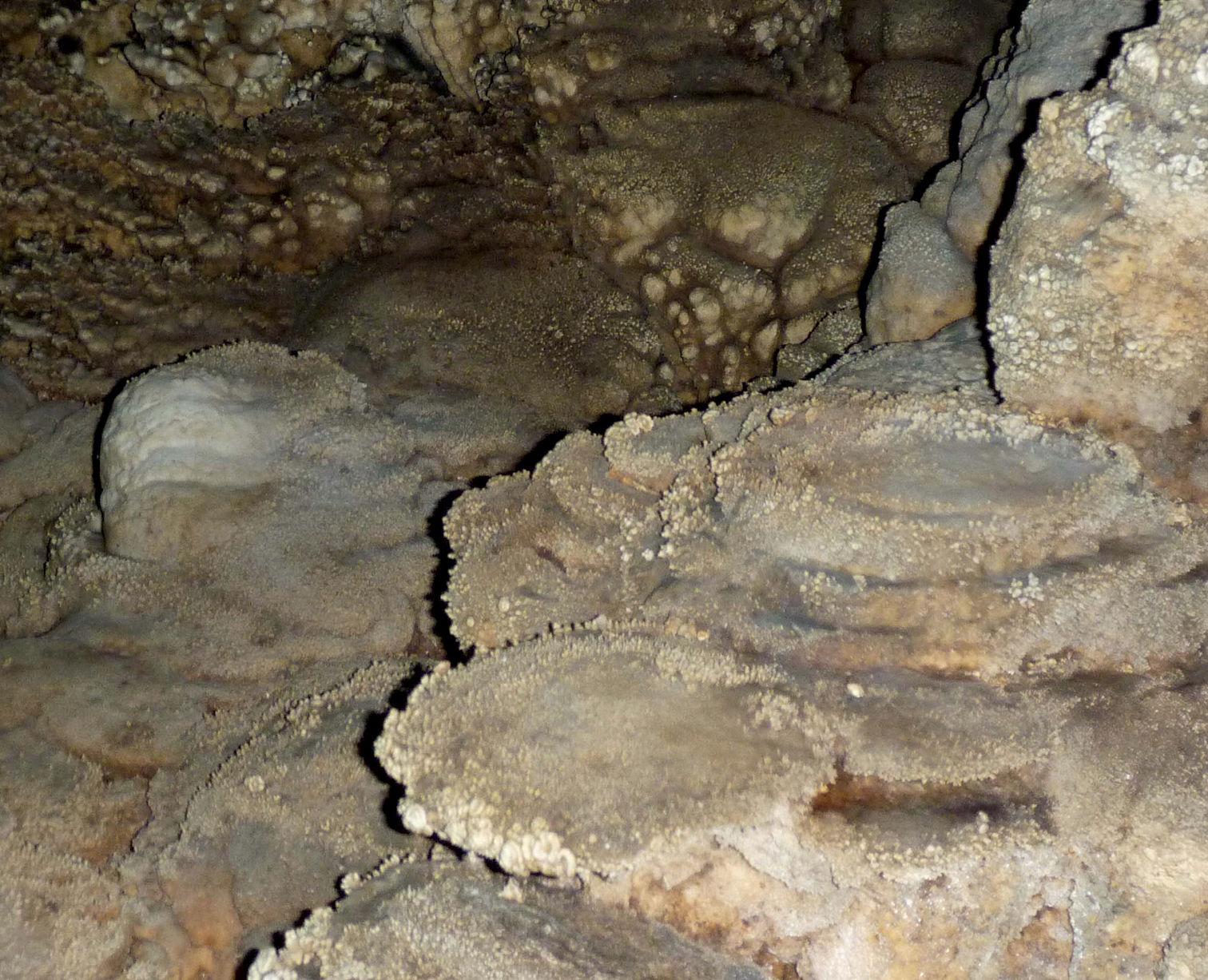
Tiên Sơn cave

Tiên Sơn cave is located in Phong Nha–Kẻ Bàng National Park. The cave was discovered by a local inhabitant by accident in 1935. It is located in Sơn Trach Commune in Bố Trạch. The entry mouth of Tiên Sơn is 1 km from Phong Nha cave, at an altitude of 200 m. This cave is 980 m (3,220 ft) in length. A 10 m-deep (33 ft) hole is situated 400 m (1,300 ft) from the entry mouth, then a 500 m-long (1,600 ft) cave, dangerous for tourists and open to professional expeditionists only. Like Phong Nha cave, this cave features spectacular stalactites and stalagmites shaped like several fairy tales. Stalactite and stalagmite columns and walls here create strange sounds like that of gong and drum if they are knocked with the hand. According to British cave scientists, Tiên Sơn cave was created tens of million years ago when a water current holed this limestone mount in Kẻ Bàng. Following a series of landforms and movement of rocks, this mass was levered or lowered, blocking the current and creating what is now Tiên Sơn cave while the underground river redirected its current to Phong Nha cave. Although Phong Nha and Tiên Sơn caves are located next to each other, there are no linking grottos between them.

=== Thiên Đường Cave ===
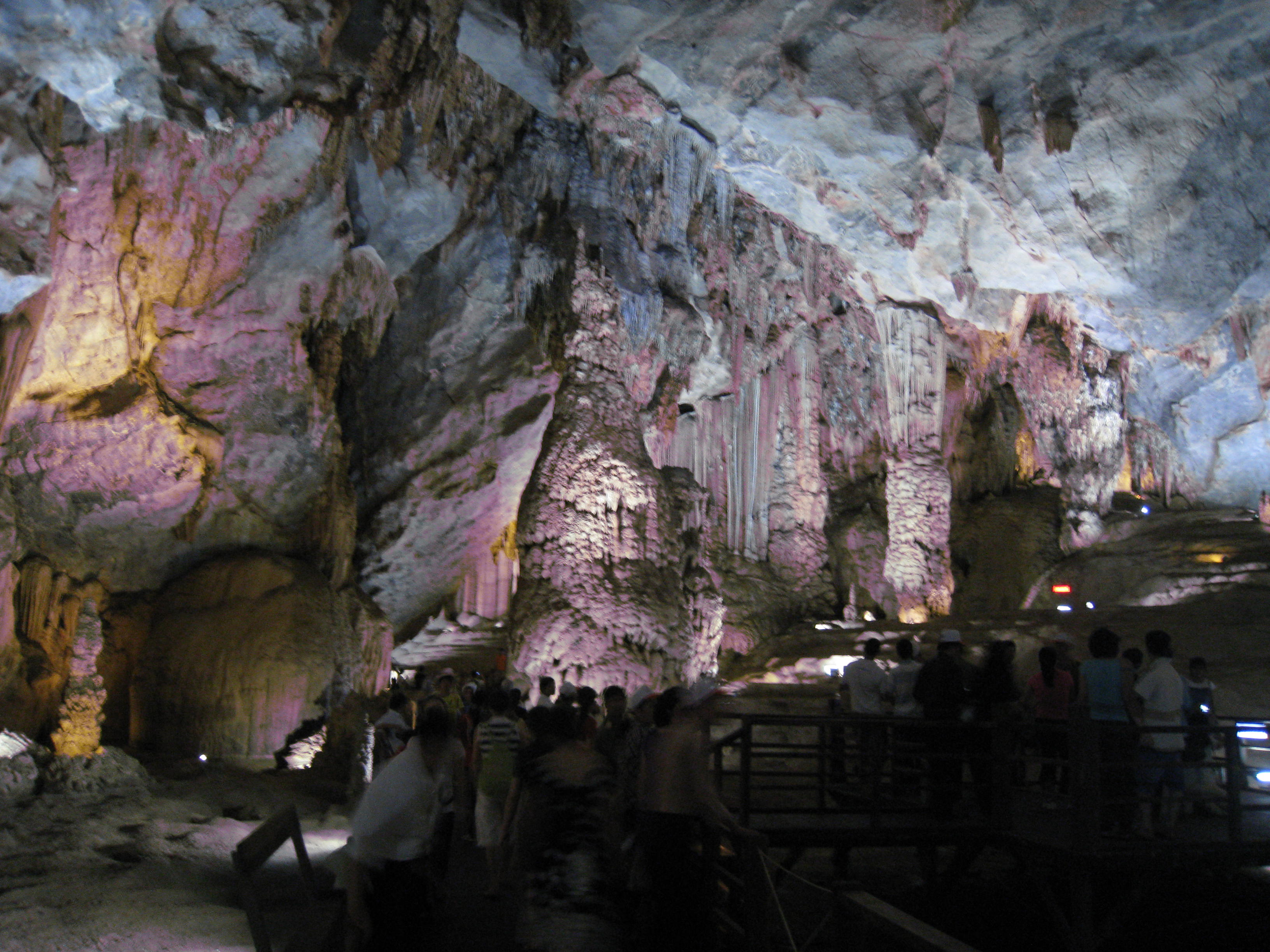
Thiên Đường Cave

Thiên Đường "Paradise" Cave is a newly found cave in this area. Prior to the discovery of Sơn Đoòng cave, it was regarded as the largest and longest cave in Phong Nha–Kẻ Bàng. Some of the most beautiful and spectacular stalactites and stalagmites in the park are found within Thiên Đường. The cave was discovered by a local man in 2005. The first 5 km of this cave was explored by explorers from the British Cave Research Association in 2005; later they in 2010 the whole 31 km was explored and announced by the association.

At 31 km long, Thiên Đường cave is longer than Phong Nha cave, previously considered the longest cave in this national park. The height can reach to 100 m and 150 wide. The limestone formation is also more spectacular than that of Phong Nha Cave. The British cave explorers was impressed by the beauty of the rock formation inside the cave, they named it "Paradise Cave" (Thiên Đường in Vietnamese). Access road and tourist facilities was built by Truong Thinh Group, it was opened up to tourists on 3 September 2010 with a 1.1 km path to see the formations.

=== Sơn Đoòng Cave ===
Sơn Đoòng Cave (in Vietnamese: Hang Sơn Đoòng, meaning Mountain River Cave) is a relatively recently discovered cave in the national park. Found by a local man and explored and publicly announced by the British cave scientists of the British Cave Research Association, it is regarded as the largest cave in the world. The biggest chamber of Sơn Đoòng is over five kilometers in length, 200 meters high and 150 meters wide. With these tremendous dimensions, Sơn Đoòng overtakes Deer Cave of Malaysia to take the title of world's largest cave. Because the fast flowing underground river in the cave deterred the explorers from going farther, they were only able to estimate the length of the cave using a flashlight.

The cave was found by a man named Hồ Khanh in 1991. The local jungle men were afraid of the cave for the whistling sound it makes from the underground river. However, not until 2009 was it made known to the public when a group of British scientists from the British Cave Research Association, led by Howard and Deb Limbert, conducted a survey in Phong Nha–Kẻ Bàng from 10 to 14 April 2009. Their progress was stopped by a large calcite wall.

According to the Limberts, this cave is five times larger than the Phong Nha Cave, previously considered the biggest cave in Vietnam. The biggest chamber of Sơn Đoòng is over five kilometers in length, 200 meters high and 150 meters wide. With these dimensions, Sơn Đoòng overtook Deer Cave in Malaysia to take the title of the world's largest cave.

=== Ruc Mon Cave ===
Ruc Mon Cave, named after the indigenous people who made a home at the entrance until the 80s, was discovered in 2016 by a local man. The cave is 17 km in length, with one entrance in Phong Nha–Kẻ Bàng National Park and the other at the border of Laos. This cave has the potential to be the second biggest cave in the world, following the first biggest cave also located in a Phong Nha. In 2017, the first tourists explored the cave, guided by the man who found it. One of over 300 caves in Phong Nha Ke Bang National Park, this cave is probably the least-explored of the many caves open to tourists. Greenland Tour company is the only company that offers access to the cave. The tours are led by the man who discovered the cave.

== Biodiversity in the park ==
=== Flora ===
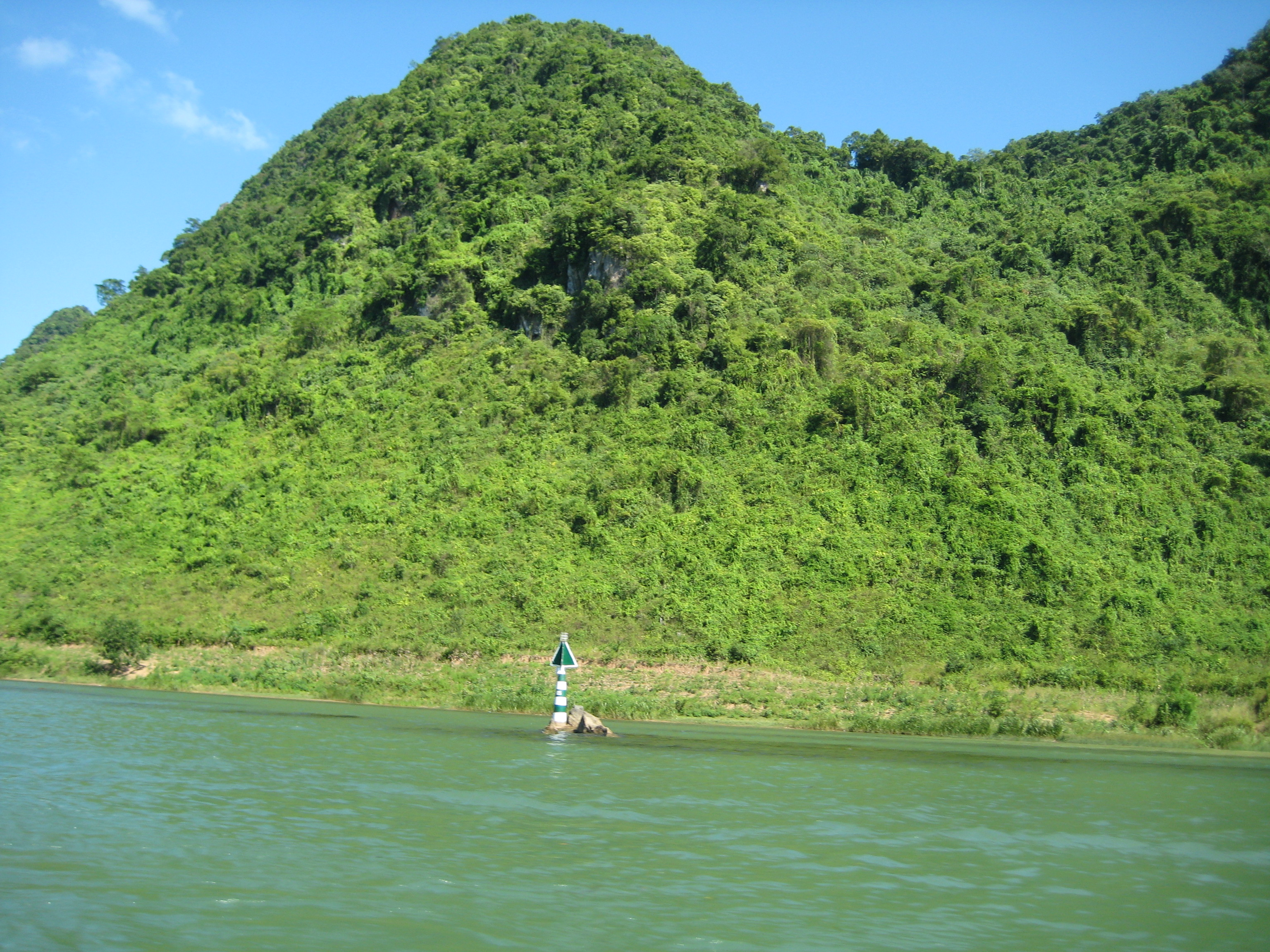
Trees on the limestone mounts, a typical florae in Phong Nha–Kẻ Bàng National Park

The park is part of the Annamites eco-region. By far the largest vegetation type is tropical dense moist evergreen forest on limestone under 800 m above sea level. 96.2% of this national park is covered with forest, 92.2% of which is intact primary forest. 74.7% (1104.76 km^{2}) of the park is covered with evergreen tropical wet forest on limestone rocks at the elevation of under 800 m; 8.5% (126 km^{2}) is evergreen tropical wet forest on limestone rocks at an elevation higher than 800 m; 8.3% (122.2 km^{2}) evergreen tropical wet forest on soil mounts at the elevation of under 800 m; evergreen tropical wet forest on limestone rocks at the elevation of under 800 m; 0.7% (10.7 km^{2}) evergreen tropical wet forest on limestone rocks at the elevation of above 800; 1.1% impacted evergreen tropical wet forest on limestone rocks; 2.8% (42.12 km^{2}) impacted evergreen tropical wet forest on soil mounts; 1.3% (1,925) grass, bush on limestone rocks; 2% (29.5 km^{2}) grass, bush on soil mounts; permanent wetland forest: 1.8 km^{2}; rattan and bamboo forest: 1.5 km^{2}; and agricultural plants: 5.21 km^{2} or 0.3%. According to the results of initial surveys, the primary tropical forest in Phong Nha–Kẻ Bàng consists of 140 families, 427 genera, and 751 species of vascular plants, of which 36 species are endangered and listed in the Vietnam's Red Data Book.

The most common tree species in this park are Hopea sp., Sumbaviopsis albicans, Garcinia fragraeoides, Burretionendron hsienmu, Chukrasia tabularis, Photinia aroboreum and Dysospyros saletti. Seedlings can only grow in holes and cracks in the limestone where soil has accumulated, so in general regeneration after disturbance is slow. The forest type in this national park is dominated by evergreen tree species with scattered deciduous trees such as Dipterocarpus kerri, Anogeissus acuminate, Pometia pinnata and Lagerstroemia calyculata. In this park, the dominant plant families are the Lauraceae, Fagaceae, Theaceae and Rosaceae, with some scattered gymnosperms such as Podocarpus imbricatus, Podocarpus neriifolius, and Nageia fleuryi.

In the park is a 50 km^{2} forest of Calocedrus macrolepis on limestone (Calocedrus rupestris) mounts with about 2,500 trees, 60,000 per km^{2}. This is the largest forest with this tree in Vietnam. Most of the trees here are 500–600 years old. These trees are listed in group 2A (rare, precious and limited exploitation) of the official letter 3399/VPCP-NN dated 21 June 2002, an amendment to the Decree 48 by the Government of Vietnam. Hanoi National University, in combination with the Research Center of Phong Nha–Kẻ Bàng National Park, has discovered 1,320 additional species in this park, of which some groups are assessed as specially rare and precious. Biologists have discovered three rare orchid species. Orchids found here include: Paphiopedilum malipoense, Paphiopedilum dianthum, Paphiopedilum concolor. In 1996 IUCN classified these orchid species in danger of extinction in the near future.

=== Fauna ===
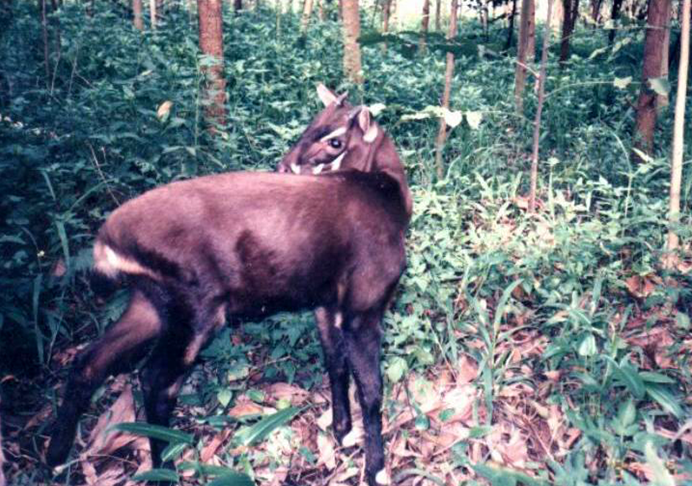
Saola, a species found in Phong Nha–Kẻ Bàng National Park

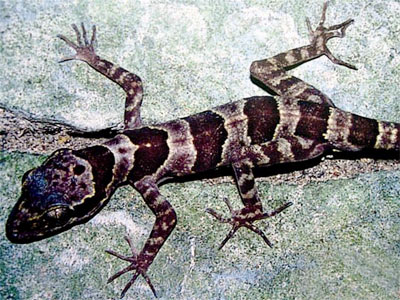
Cyrtodactylus phongnhakebangensis, a newly found species in Phong Nha–Kẻ Bàng National Park

The forest is also home to 98 families, 256 genera and 381 species of vertebrates. Sixty-six (66) animal species are listed in the Vietnam's Red Data Book and 23 other species in the World Red Book of Endangered Species. In 2005, a new species of gecko (Lygosoma boehmeiwas) was discovered here by a group of Vietnamese biologists together with biologists working for the park, Cologne Zoo in Germany and the Saint Petersburg Wild Zoology Institute in Russia. The gaur and one species of eel have been discovered in this park. Ten new species never seen before in Vietnam were discovered by scientists in this national park.

The park is home to significant populations of primates in Vietnam, with ten species and sub-species. These include the globally vulnerable pig-tailed macaque, Assam macaque, stump-tailed macaque and white-cheeked crested gibbon (Nomascus leucogenys and Nomascus leucogenys siki). The park is probably home to the largest population of François' langur in Vietnam, including two different forms of the species. The area is highly significant for its population of Hatinh langur and black langur. It is undoubtedly the largest population of these species in the world, and probably the only population represented in a protected area. Other endangered large mammals include the mainland serow (Capricornis sumatraensis), giant muntjac (Megamuntiacus vuquangensis) and possibly the saola (Pseudoryx nghetinhensis). The Asian black bear (Selenarctos thibetanus) and sun bear (Helarctos malayanus) are confirmed. Other smaller mammals include Sunda pangolins (Manis javanica) and the recently discovered Annamite striped rabbit (Nesolagus timminsi), called locally "thỏ van". Ten bat species listed in the IUCN List of Threatened Species have been recorded in this park.

Of the 59 recorded reptile and amphibian species, 18 are listed in Vietnam's Red Data Book and 6 are listed in the IUCN Red List of Threatened Animals. Further research has increased the species numbers markedly, and the number of recorded amphibian species is now 50 and that of reptile species 101. The 72 fish species include 4 species endemic to the area, including Danio quangbinhensis. The park is home to over 200 bird species, inclusive of several rare birds such as: chestnut-necklaced partridge, red-collared woodpecker, brown hornbill, sooty babbler and short-tailed scimitar babbler. There is good evidence for the Vietnamese pheasant (Lophura hatinhensis) and imperial pheasant (Lophura imperialis) species at Phong Nha–Kẻ Bàng area. An initiative survey conducted by Russian and Vietnamese scientists from Vietnam-Russia Tropical Centre (funded by WWF) recorded 259 butterfly species of 11 families. Almost all major butterfly taxa in Vietnam can be found in Phong Nha–Kẻ Bàng park. The land snail species Cyclophorus phongnhakebangensis is only known from the national park.

== Historical significance ==
The oldest evidence of human occupation of the area are Neolithic axe heads and similar artifacts found in some of the caves. Phong Nha–Kẻ Bàng is home to archeological and historical relics, such as a medieval Cham inscription on rock slab and terracotta ex-voto sealings of the Cham people, erected in the 9th century to consecrate Avalokiteśvara. In 1995, the Archeological Institute of Vietnam remarked that Phong Nha cave is probably an extremely important archeological site. This organization suggested that what remained in Bi Ky grotto may have been a Champa mosque from the 9th to 11th century. Inside Phong Nha cave, many Champa style ceramics, earthware vases with lotus-shaped ruby-colored, slight pink mouth.

In 1899, a French missioner, Léopold Cadière surveyed the customs and culture of the local inhabitants living along the Son River. In the letter to École française d'Extrême-Orient, he stated that: "What remains here proves to be valuable for history. To keep it is to help science". In the early 20th century, cave explorers and researchers from France and the UK discovered several ancient Champa and Vietnamese relics, such as altar, steles, hieroglyphic script, sculptures, stone statues, Buddha statues, and Chinese artifacts. King Hàm Nghi built a base for the Vietnamese resistance against the French colonialists in the late 19th century.

== Recognition by UNESCO ==
=== Nomination and recognition in 2003 ===
Phong Nha–Kẻ Bàng National Park was first nominated as a UNESCO World Heritage Site in 1998. Dossiers was first submitted by Vietnamese government to UNESCO for recognition of Phong Nha nature reserve as a world natural heritage under the name "Phong Nha Nature Reserve". The reason given for the nomination was that this nature reserve satisfied criteria of biodiversity, unique beauty and geodiversity (criteria I and iv).

In 1999, the World Conservation Union (IUCN) conducted a field survey in January and February. At the meeting in July 1999, Evaluation Bureau concluded that Phong Nha Nature Reserve would meet with criteria I and IV as a world heritage nominee on the condition that this nature reserve was expanded to include the larger Phong Nha–Kẻ Bàng parkland with an associated fully integrated management structure. This bureau stated that the site was part of an extremely complex and ancient karst plateau with high geodiversity which also encompasses Kẻ Bàng and Hin Namno karsts. The reserve is largely covered in tropical forest with a high level of biodiversity and endemic species. Lack of research means that the true significance of the biodiversity and geology of the area cannot be fully assessed. The evaluation bureau concluded that the nominated area on its own is not considered to meet World Heritage criteria. The Bureau decided to defer the nomination of Phong Nha Nature Reserve.

In 2000, the government of Vietnam submitted a revised nomination with a much larger area. At this time, however, the National Assembly and government of Vietnam also announced that it would be constructing the north–south Hồ Chí Minh Highway and a link road between the Highway and Route 20 that bisects part of the core area of the Phong Nha Nature Reserve. The news of this road construction raised concern over its impacts on the Phong Nha Nature Reserve, and many international organization like IUCN, Flora and Fauna International called on Vietnamese government to reconsider its plan. They also advised of the negative impact of these road and construction activities on biodiversity. Due to this plan of road construction, the evaluation bureau did not proceed further consideration of nomination from Vietnamese government at that time. The government of Vietnam provided the bureau with additional information in May 2002, announcing the decision of the Prime Minister of Vietnam (December 2001) on upgrading Phong Nha–Kẻ Bàng to the Phong Nha–Kẻ Bàng National Park with a total area of 857.54 km^{2}; providing information on projects for the conservation and development of the park and revised maps. The revised nominated site has a smaller area than the 2000 nomination.

It was recognized as a world natural heritage site at the UNESCO's 27th general assembly session being held in Paris, from 30 June to 5 July 2003. At the session, delegates from over 160 member countries of UNESCO World Heritage Convention agreed to include Phong Nha–Kẻ Bàng parkland and 30 others worldwide in the list of world heritage sites. Phong Nha–Kẻ Bàng National Park meets with criteria viii in accordance with UNESCO's appraisal scale as it displays an impressive amount of evidence of earth's history and is a site of very great importance for increasing human understanding of the geologic, geomorphic and geo-chronological history of the region.

=== Recognition for a second time ===
The National Council for Cultural Heritage, an organization under the Ministry of Culture and Information of Vietnam (now the Ministry of Culture, Sports and Tourism) recommended the Vietnamese prime minister that Phong Nha–Kẻ Bàng National Park be submitted to UNESCO second time for recognition as a world natural heritage for biodiversity. In 2003 this park was listed in UNESCO's world heritage sites for criteria viii "outstanding geological, geomorphical, and geographical values". Vietnamese and international experts believed that if Vietnam timely submits the proposal documents to UNESCO and meet this UNESCO's criteria, this national park will be recognized for a second time in 2008. Since the recognition by UNESCO in 2003, the government of Vietnam has continued to compile scientific documentation to seek recognition of the park as a world natural heritage in terms of biodiversity in addition to geographical values. According to World Wildlife Foundation report in 2000, Phong Nha–Kẻ Bàng National Park is one of 200 biodiversity centres of the world and one of the 60 significant sanctuaries of Vietnam. It has a unique forest type in the world: green tropical forest. The park also has 15 other types of forests.

At the final conference of the National Council for Cultural Heritage held in Vietnam in 2007, scientists attending the meeting highly praised the scientific documentation of Phong Nha–Kẻ Bàng park. Accordingly, the park is second to no other national parks listed in UNESCO's world heritage sites as far as biodiversity is concerned.

== Tourist activities ==
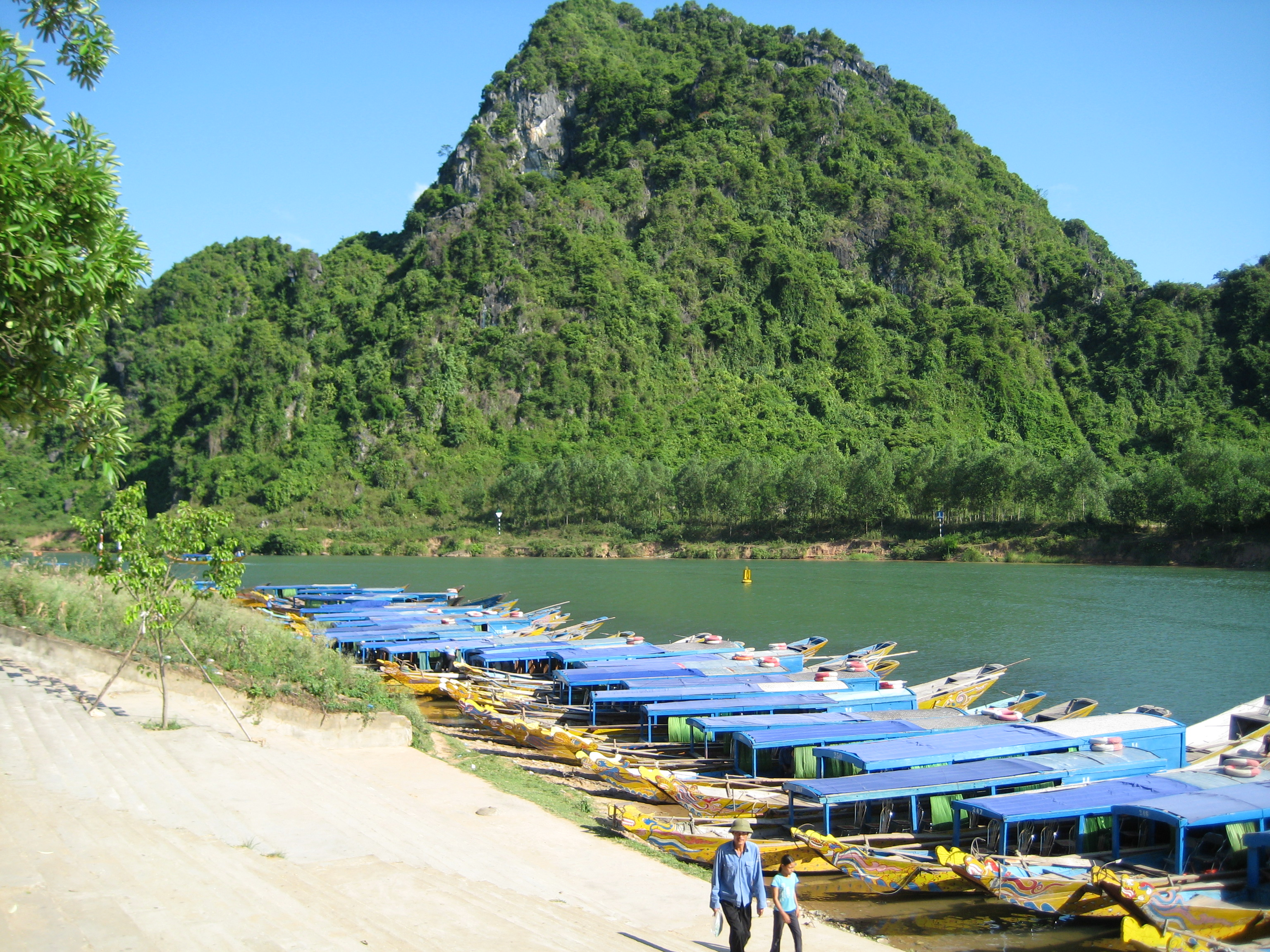
Boats for tourist in Phong Nha–Kẻ Bàng National Park

The park is accessible by road (National Route 1 or Hồ Chí Minh Highway 450 km south of Hanoi, 50 km north of Đồng Hới, 210 km north of Huế); by rail at Đồng Hới Railway Station on Hanoi–Saigon Railway; by air at Đồng Hới Airport 45 km south of the park. Tourists are served at the Tourism Service Center at Phong Nha township of Bố Trạch District, the entrance of this center is located by Hồ Chí Minh Highway. Tourists are required to buy entrance ticket for package services, including entrance fee, boat service. Ecotourism tour (if needed) requires additional service fee. Tourists then are transported by boat along the Sơn River upstream to the Phong Nha and Paradise caves. The number of tourists has increased dramatically since the park was listed in UNESCO's World Heritage Sites. Quảng Bình Province has invested in upgrading the Phong Nha–Kẻ Bàng visitor site to turn it into one of Vietnam's major tourist destinations.

Numerous ecotourism projects have been licensed for development and the area is being heavily developed by the province to turn it into a major tourist site in Vietnam. Phong Nha–Kẻ Bàng is part of a tourism promotion campaign, "Middle World Heritage Road", which includes the ancient capital of Huế, the Champa relics of Mỹ Sơn, the city of Hội An, Nhã nhạc and the Space of gong culture in the Central Highlands of Vietnam.

Tourist activities in Phong Nha–Kẻ Bàng National Park are organized by local travel agencies and vary:

- Tour for expedition of caves and grottos in boats and with professional cave expedition means.
- Ecotourism, discovering the flora and fauna in this national park in the Kẻ Bàng Forest.
- Mountain climbing, trekking: There are extreme sloping mountains here with a height of over 1,000 m, which is a real challenge for adventurous climbers.

One of the adventure tour sites is boating upward on the Chay River into primitive forests, as the river becomes sinuous with several waterfalls and whirlpools until tourists arrive at Tro Mong. This tour sites have been surveyed and included in local travel agents besides cave exploration tour. In Phong Nha–Kẻ Bàng park, there is a 50 m-high waterfall, Chai Waterfall. There is a bull field called Ran Bo (Bull Field) because wild bulls usually comes and reproduce in mating season. There are also some interesting tourist attractions in this park like Nước Ngang ("Horizontal Spring"), a spring runs horizontally instead of vertically as usual; Ðá Nằm (Crouching Stone), a stone blockading a stream current; Chân Thớt (Chopping Board), a chopping-board-shaped stone. But above all, the most spectacular scene is this area is Nước Trồi (Surfacing Stream), a stream surfacing from the ground. Several streams here run for a long distance, then disappear under the ground. The provincial Centre for Phong Nha–Kẻ Bàng's Ecotourism and Culture currently has 248 boats, creating jobs for 500 locals. Every boat has two trained boatmen earning VND70,000 per day. This income is relatively high for locals in this province. This centre also launched a programme in 2000 to train former loggers to work as photographers taking pictures for tourists and about 300 former loggers are now doing this.

Đồng Hới is the closest city to Phong Nha. To facilitate the increasing flow of tourists to the site, the Đồng Hới Airport was constructed and put into operation in May 2008 with air link with Hanoi's Noi Bai International Airport and air link with Ho Chi Minh City's Tan Son Nhat International Airport beginning from 1 July 2009. Besides Đồng Hới, Huế is another base city which tourists begins their journey from. Day tours running from Huế are highly common.

Phong Nha–Kẻ Bàng, together with Hạ Long Bay and Fanxipan, is listed as a candidate for seven new world natural wonders vote. On 12 February 2008 it was ranked 10th in the voting list. In January 2009, the United States-based Los Angeles Times listed Phong Nha–Kẻ Bàng National Park in its recommended world's 29 destinations to visit in 2009.

In October 2014, Quang Binh province announced plans by Sun Group to build a cable car system linking caves in the park. The plan was met with a great deal of opposition from conservationists, and the government backtracked, saying that the plan was not yet approved. Proponents say that the area is attracting a growing number of visitors and that the cable car would be the most environmentally friendly means of managing the crowds. Opponents say that construction of the cable car system could damage the fragile caves, and once it is operational it would attract more visitors than the park can sustainably handle.

== Management issues ==
=== Management activities ===
The Park Management Board includes 115 people, composed of zoologists, botanists, silviculturists, and socio-economists. Some say the management staff lacks the authority to fine violators and lacks equipment like helicopters and sufficient funds, thus it's hard to efficiently deal with natural and human threats to the park.

A semi-wild zone of 0.18 km^{2}, surrounded by electrical wire fence, saved for the primate species was created in this park. This project is sponsored by Zoologische Gesellschaft Frankfurt (Germany) in order to provide a sanctuary for 10 species of primates, including the Hatinh langur and the red-shanked douc. This protection zone is suitable for primate habitat.

=== Threats to biodiversity ===
There are two villages of Arem an Ma Coong ethnic groups in the core zone of the Phong Nha–Kẻ Bàng National Park. Within the buffer zone, there is a population of 52,000. They are mainly Kinh people and other minority groups of Chut and Van Kieu, many of them exploit forest products as part of their livelihoods. The increase of visitors to this park is also a problem to the park since unexpected pollution (water pollution, rubbish), human impacts on caves and grottos may cause damage to them and especially threaten biodiversity. Hunting is a significant threat to the wildlife because local people have a great consumption demand on wild meat and this has contributed to the significant decrease of species such as the wild pig, binturong and primates. While local authorities have taken no legal action, nevertheless, some civil servants and policemen are the owners of restaurants that serve wild animal meats hunted in this national park. Phong Nha–Kẻ Bàng National Park is currently not meaningful for protection of tigers, Asian elephants, and wild bulls.

Rare eels like Anguilla marmorata and Anguilla bicolor have been caught and consumed in large numbers by the local residents and served as specialities in restaurants because local inhabitants believe they are "natural Viagra".

Excessive exploitation of rare wood such as go mun wood (Diospyros spp.) and go huế wood (Dalbergia rimosa) and oils from trees such as Cinnamomum balansea, rattan has cause an exhaustion of these plants in many areas of the park. Bat population in caves and grottos also face disturbance by human activities. Hồ Chí Minh Highway, Road 20 crossing the edge zone and the connection road linking these two roads crossing the core zone also contribute danger to the wildlife in this national park, especially populations of Hatinh langur and black langur. During the construction of this road, blasts and other activities kept several primates away from their regular habitat.

Due to poor management by the local government, many areas of forest in the buffer zone were cleared heavily, some completely. Limestone in the Phong Nha–Kẻ Bàng area has been exploited for commercial purposes by local inhabitants, but the local authority has taken no countermeasures to prevent this.

The provincial government approved a 3600MW coal-fueled thermalelectrical plant in Vĩnh Sơn village, Quảng Đông commune, Quảng Trạch District, 40 km northeast of this national park. This project has deeply concerned many environmentalists as it will probably cause air and water pollution to the park. Wildfire during the dry season is a recurring threat to the forest.

=== Land management in adjacent areas ===
The land management and regulation of the commercial activities in the area surrounding the park have been carried out by the provincial authorities in a disorganized manner. Blocks of land have been sold to local investors and inhabitants for building service utilities in a haphazard way, resulting in the formation of a slum at the entrance of the park. This has been compounded by some investors who do not develop their lots but hold them for future sale. The planning scheme for 2 km^{2} of land adjacent to the park was criticized by many experts as having been done "without future vision". Quảng Bình's provincial government responded by declaring their intention to recruit internationally recognised planners to help draft tourism development plans for the adjacent areas.

=== International funding ===
On November 3, 2005, the German government announced funding valued at 12.6 million euros for the park's management board for the purpose of protecting the biodiversity of the park. In 2007, the German government donated a further 1.8 million euros to Vietnam for protection of the park.

Fauna and Flora International donated US$132,000 to Phong Nha–Kẻ Bàng National Park Management Board for the protection of primates in this national park as well as in the buffer zone. In 1998, FFI conducted a training project for the management staff of the park. The British Commission for International Development sponsored a fund for the WWF to protect the biodiversity in the park and in the adjacent Hin Namno Nature Reserve in Laos. FFI received environmental funding from the British Department for Environment, Food and Rural Affairs to implement a campaign targeted at increasing awareness about biodiversity protection among tourists and locals.
