= Phúc Trạch (disambiguation) =

Phúc Trạch may refer to several places in Vietnam, including:

- Phúc Trạch, Hà Tĩnh, a rural commune of Hà Tĩnh province.
- Phúc Trạch, Quảng Bình, a former rural commune of Bố Trạch District.
