= BCRA =

BCRA is an initialism that can represent:

- Banco Central de la República Argentina, the Central Bank of Argentina
- Better Care Reconciliation Act of 2017, the U.S. Senate version of the American Health Care Act of 2017
- Bipartisan Campaign Reform Act
- British Cave Research Association
- Bureau Central de Renseignements et d'Action, "Intelligence and Operations Central Bureau", commonly referred as just BCRA, the World War II era forerunner of the SDECE French intelligence service.
