= Láng Sen Wetland Reserve =

Wetland reserve in Vietnam

- Interactive map of Láng Sen Wetland Reserve
- Location: Dong Thap Muoi, Vietnam
- Coordinates: 10°46′N 105°43′E
- Area: 4,802 ha (18.54 sq mi)

Ramsar Wetland
- Official name: Lang Sen Wetland Reserve
- Designated: 22 May 2015
- Reference no.: 2227

Lang Sen Wetland Reserve (Vietnamese language: Khu bảo tồn đất ngập nước Láng Sen) is a wetland area in Dong Thap Muoi, Long An Province, Vietnam.

== Description ==
The reserve covers an area of 5030 hectares. The area features the diverse topography and geomorphology of a typical wetland swamp. Lang Sen area is heavily covered with flora varied to the seasonal tides of the Mekong river (Bassac River), especially planted cajuput forest which attracts a diverse fauna to inhabit here. According to the preliminary survey, there exists 156 wild species belonging to 60 families; 149 vertebrate species belonging to 46 families, of which 13 species are listed in Vietnam's Red Data Book; the aquatic species are abundant. Among new species discovered are the Wild Mekong, a gecko with bright orange legs, a yellow neck, and a blue-grey body with yellow bars on its bright orange sides.

== Diversity ==
The diversity of the flora and fauna here has been damaged by the agricultural activities of the local residents, reducing the number of endemic species once lived here. Since 1998, several researches and surveys have been implemented by local and international organizations in order to collect appropriate proof for the establishment of a natural reserve. In early 2004, this wetland area became a wetland reserve by the decision of the Vietnamese government. It was also chosen as one of two typical areas of wise biological diversity reserve in Mekong Basin sponsored by IUCN, GEF, UNDP, and MWBP.
