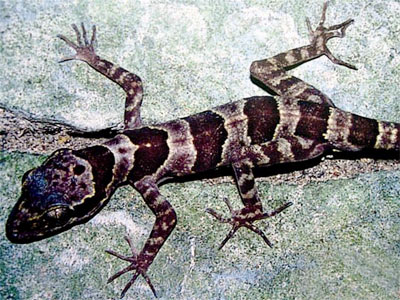
- in Phong Nha-Ke Bang National Park

Scientific classification
- Kingdom: Animalia
- Phylum: Chordata
- Class: Reptilia
- Order: Squamata
- Suborder: Gekkota
- Family: Gekkonidae
- Genus: Cyrtodactylus
- Species: C. phongnhakebangensis

Binomial name
- Cyrtodactylus phongnhakebangensis Ziegler, Rösler, Herrmann, and Thanh, 2003

= Cyrtodactylus phongnhakebangensis =

Species of lizard

Cyrtodactylus phongnhakebangensis (Vietnamese: Thằn lằn Phong Nha-Kẻ Bàng) is a species of gecko native to Phong Nha-Kẻ Bàng National Park, Quảng Bình Province, North Central Coast, Vietnam. It was discovered and described in 2002.
