= Plain of Reeds =

Inland wetland in the Mekong Delta

Coordinates: 10.5°N 105.7°E

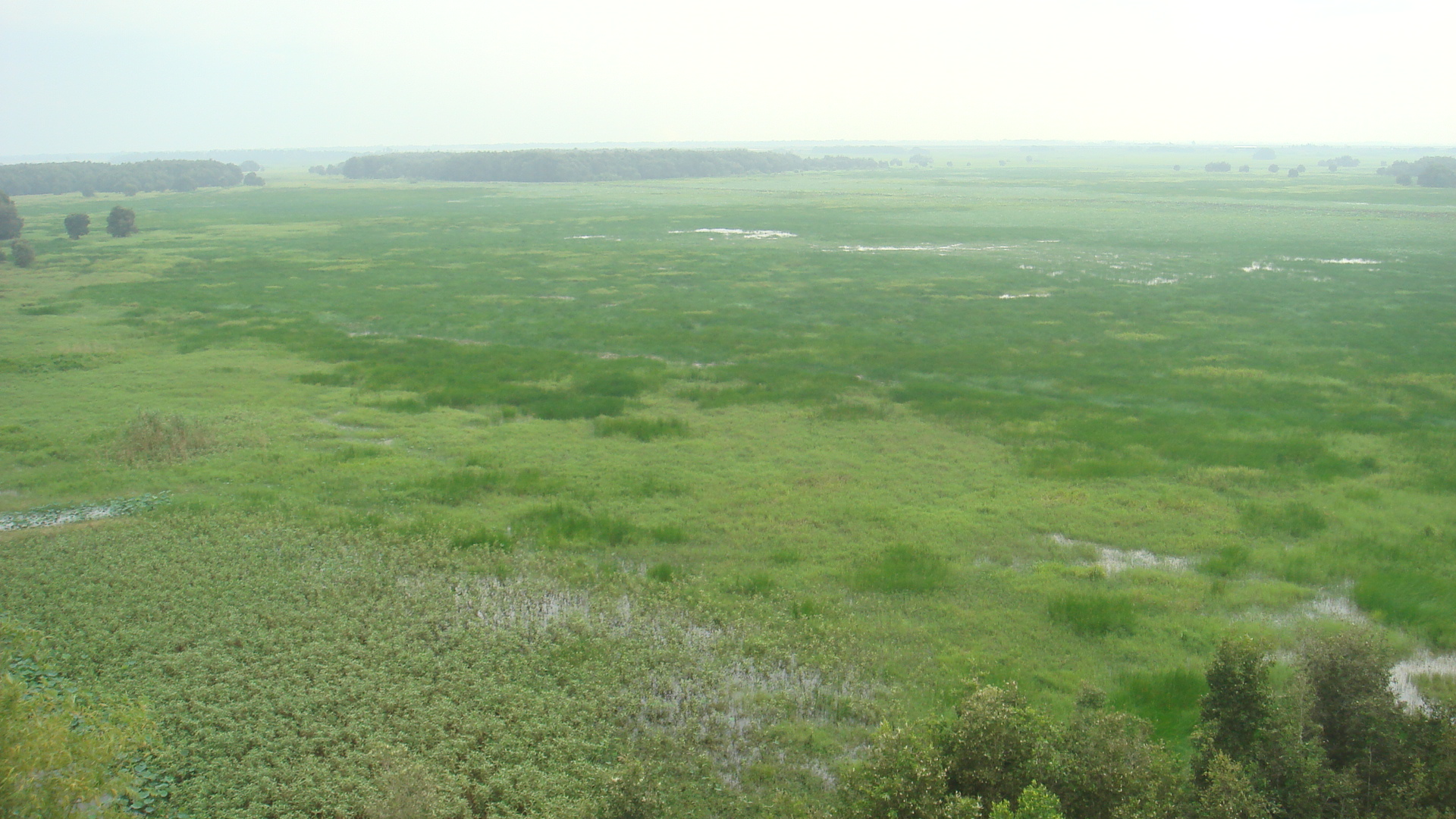
Plain of Reeds from above

Plain of Reeds (in Vietnamese: Đồng Tháp Mười) is an inland wetland in Vietnam's Mekong Delta. Most of the wetlands are within Long An Province and Đồng Tháp Province.

== Physical characteristics ==
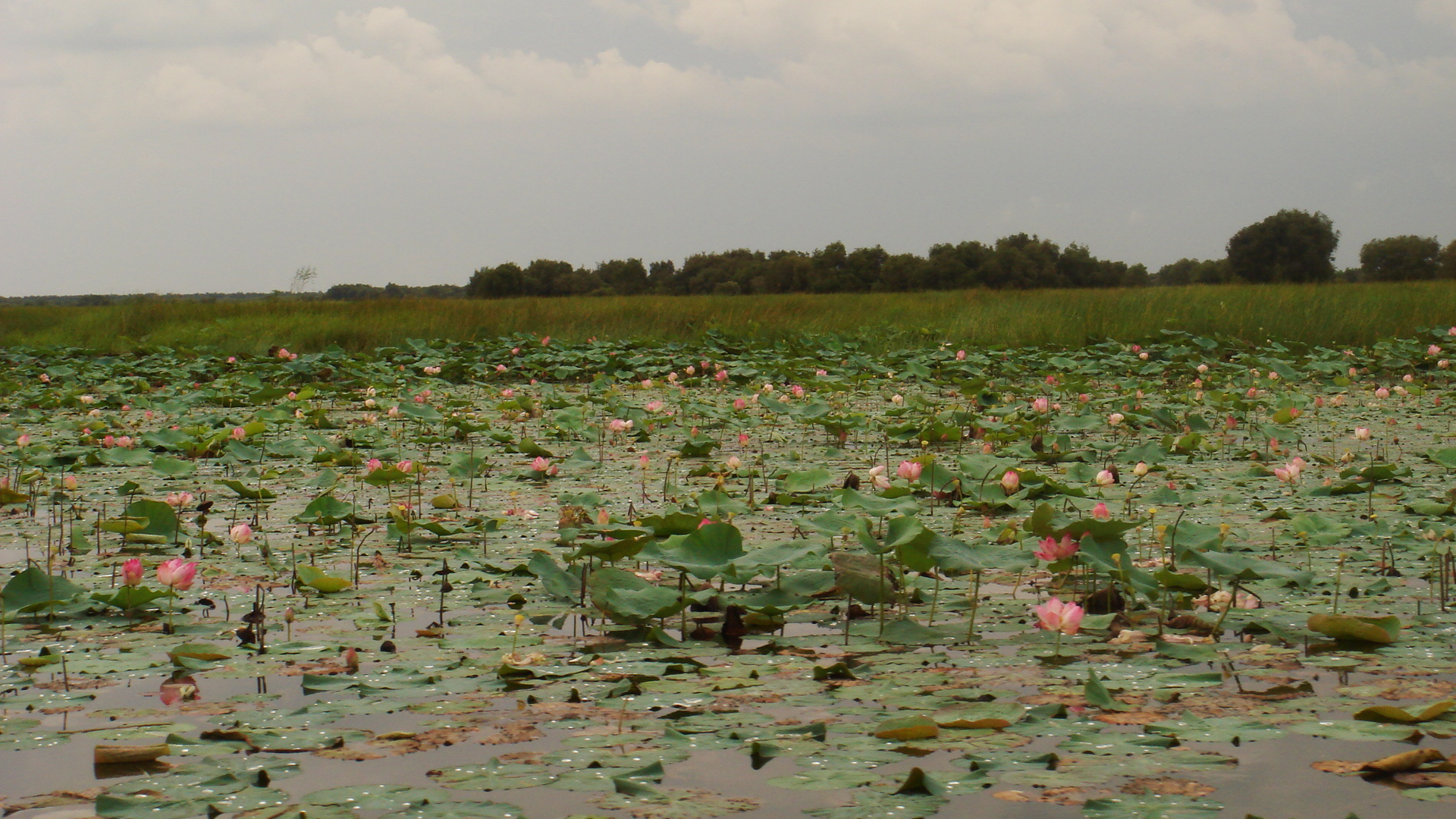
Lotus in Đồng Tháp Mười

Đồng Tháp Mười is a "back swamp" forming a large inundated depression of highly acidic soil. Until the 1970s, only primitive floating rice could be grown in the area. It is similar to a very large swampy floodplain stretching along the Bassac River from Châu Đốc to the foot of the Takeo Plateau. It was around 1,000,000 hectares in the 18th century and is now half that size due to drainage. Within Đồng Tháp Mười the Tràm Chim National Park has been protected for the conservation of wetland ecosystems.

== History ==
Pre-Angkor remains along the Vàm Cỏ indicate that the Vàm Cỏ originally connected with the main Mekong riverways at Dong Thap Muoi and would have formed the main route from Cambodia to the South China Sea. However, when the river silted up the Khmers abandoned the area.

Đồng Tháp Mười had served as a base for rebels and bandits throughout Vietnam's recent history. During the First Indochina War, the swamp frequently served as a base for the communist-led Viet Minh, though the French anticipated and prevented this on at least one occasion.

The area was used as a base by Ba Cụt, a Vietnamese military commander of the Hòa Hảo religious sect.

During the Vietnam War the Plain covered an area of 2500 square miles across Kien Tuong, Kien Phong, Hậu Nghĩa, Long An and Định Tường Provinces and again served as a base for Vietcong forces. From 1–8 January 1966 U.S., Australian and Army of the Republic of Vietnam (ARVN) forces conducted Operation Marauder/Operation An Dan 564 in the area.

== See also ==
- Láng Sen Wetland Reserve
