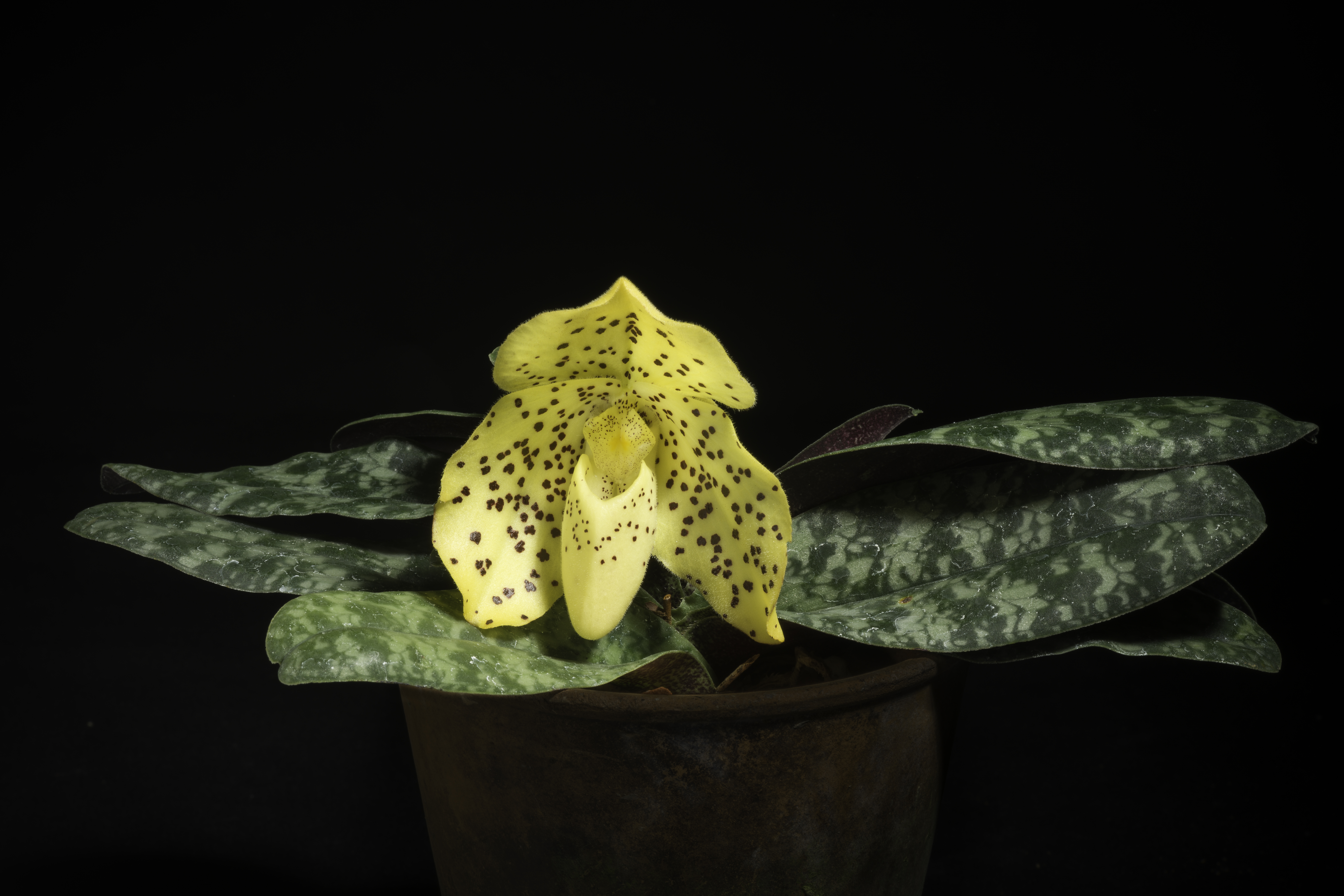
- Paphiopedilum wenshanense

Scientific classification
- Kingdom: Plantae
- Clade: Tracheophytes
- Clade: Angiosperms
- Clade: Monocots
- Order: Asparagales
- Family: Orchidaceae
- Subfamily: Cypripedioideae
- Genus: Paphiopedilum
- Subgenus: Paphiopedilum subg. Brachypetalum
- Species: P. wenshanense

Binomial name
- Paphiopedilum wenshanense Z.J.Liu & J.Yong Zhang 2000

Synonyms
- Paphiopedilum concobellatulum hort.

= Paphiopedilum wenshanense =

Species of plant

Paphiopedilum wenshanense is a species of Paphiopedilum in the subgenus Brachypetalum found in Wenshan Zhuang and Miao Autonomous Prefecture in Yunnan, China. The plant is found growing in densely shrubby and grassy slopes in limestone areas at elevations between 1000 and 1200 meters.
