= Hoàn Lão =

Coordinates: 17°35′N 106°32′E

- Commune and village
- Interactive map of Hoàn Lão
- Country: Vietnam
- Province: Quảng Trị
- Time zone: UTC+07:00

Hoan Lao

Hoàn Lão is a commune of Quảng Trị, is located about 13 km north of Đồng Hới.

On June 16, 2025, the Standing Committee of the National Assembly issued Resolution No. 1680/NQ-UBTVQH15 on the reorganization of commune-level administrative units in Quảng Trị Province in 2025. Accordingly, Hoàn Lão Township, together with Trung Trạch Commune, Đại Trạch Commune, Tây Trạch Commune, and Hòa Trạch Commune, were merged to form a new commune named Hoàn Lão Commune.

The commune (xã) is located about 30 km east of Phong Nha-Kẻ Bàng National Park a UNESCO Heritage Site. Hoàn Lão covers 5,70 km^{2} and had a population of 7,372 in 2012.
