= The Road of Heritage Sites in Central Vietnam =

Tourism program

Heritage Sites in The Road of Heritage Sites in Central Vietnam.

The Road of Heritage Sites in Central Vietnam is a tourism program initiated by the Administration of Tourism of Vietnam. This road will link World Heritage Sites in the Middle of Vietnam, namely: Phong Nha-Ke Bang National Park (Quang Binh province), ancient capital of Huế, ancient trade port city of Hoi An (Quang Nam province) and My Son Champa ancient capital. This road will also link other World Heritage points of Angkor Wat (Cambodia) and Luang Prabang (Laos) in another tourism program called "Vietnam - Laos - Cambodia, 3 countries, one destination".
