= Léopold Michel Cadière =

Père Léopold Michel Cadière (1869–1955) was a French missionary of Paris Foreign Missions Society (Missions Etrangères de Paris) who wrote 250 research works about Vietnamese history, religions, customs, linguistics in the early 20th century. He placed the foundation for Vietnamese studies in the 20th century. He arrived in Huế on 20 October 1892.

== Bibliography ==
- Dartigues, Laurent (2018). « Entre foi et désir de science : une biographie de Léopold Cadière, prêtre-savant en Annam », in BEROSE - International Encyclopaedia of the Histories of Anthropology, Paris.
