= Phúc Trạch =

Coordinates: 18°08′N 105°46′E

- Rural commune and village
- Interactive map of Phúc Trạch
- Country: Vietnam
- Province: Hà Tĩnh
- Time zone: UTC+07:00 (Indochina Time)

Phúc Trạch is a rural commune (xã) and village in Hà Tĩnh Province, in Vietnam. It is one of the 69 new wards, communes and special zones of the province following the reorganization in 2025.

On June 16, 2025, the Standing Committee of the National Assembly issued Resolution No. 1665/NQ-UBTVQH15. Accordingly, the entire natural area and population of Hương Trạch Commune, Hương Liên Commune, and Phúc Trạch Commune were merged to form a new commune named Phúc Trạch Commune.
