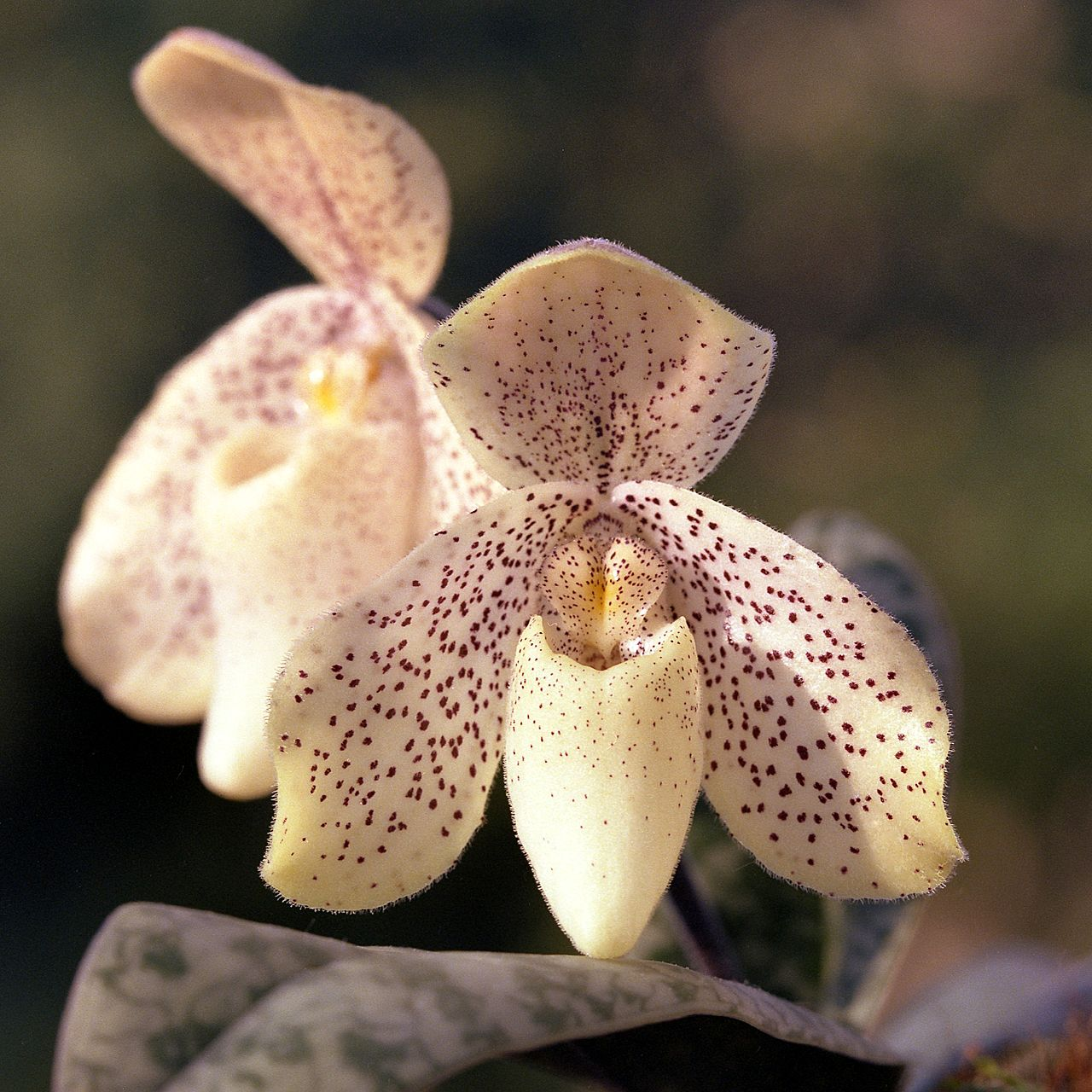

Scientific classification
- Kingdom: Plantae
- Clade: Tracheophytes
- Clade: Angiosperms
- Clade: Monocots
- Order: Asparagales
- Family: Orchidaceae
- Subfamily: Cypripedioideae
- Genus: Paphiopedilum
- Species: P. concolor

Binomial name
- Paphiopedilum concolor (Lindl. ex Bateman) Pfitzer

Synonyms
- Cypripedium concolor Lindl. ex Bateman (basionym); Cordula concolor (Lindl. ex Bateman) Rolfe

= Paphiopedilum concolor =

Species of orchid

Paphiopedilum concolor is a small terrestrial orchid first described in 1865 as Cypripedium concolor. It has dark green and grey-green mottled leaves, up to 150 by 40 mm (6 by 1 1/2 in). Paphiopedilum concolor is native to southern China (Yunnan, Guizhou, Guangxi), Myanmar (Burma), Thailand and Southern and Central Vietnam, usually in Phong Nha-Kẻ Bàng National Park in Quảng Bình Province. They are generally found in lowlands, below 300 m (1,000 ft) elevation, but have been found above 1,000 m (3,300 ft).

Paphiopedilum concolor flowers in Spring and Autumn. Its 100 mm (4 in) tall scape has reddish hairs and carries one or two flowers approximately 70 mm (2 3/4 in) in diameter. These flowers come coloured in cream to peach, with dark red speckles. This orchid prefers a warm habitat and wet soil.
