= British Caving Association =

Governing body for caving in the United Kingdom

- Abbreviation: BCA
- Predecessor: National Caving Association
- Formation: 2004
- Region served: United Kingdom
- Chair: Rostam Namaghi
- Website: british-caving.org.uk

The British Caving Association (BCA) is the sports governing body for caving in the United Kingdom. It is recognised by UK Sport, Sport England and SportScotland.

== History ==
The British Speleological Association (BSA) was founded in 1935, but this was not a national governing body. The National Caving Association (NCA) was established in 1968 as the first governing body, recognised by the Sports Council. However, the British Cave Research Association, the successor to the BSA, continued to perform some 'national body' functions after its formation in 1973. The NCA existed until 2005 when it passed its responsibilities to the British Caving Association, which had been established the prior year. At the same time, the BCA also took over national body functions from the British Cave Research Association.

== Structure ==
The membership of the BCA is composed of Constituent Bodies, Regional Councils, clubs and individuals.

The Constituent Bodies are:

- Association of Caving Instructors (ACI)
- Association of Scout Caving Teams (ASCT)
- British Cave Research Association (BCRA)
- British Cave Rescue Council (BCRC)
- Cave Diving Group (CDG)
- Council of Higher Education Caving Clubs (CHECC)
- National Association of Mining History Organisations (NAMHO)
- William Pengelly Cave Studies Trust (WPCST)

The Regional Councils are:

- Cambrian Caving Council - responsible for Wales and The Marches
- Council for the Northern Caving Community - responsible for the north of Britain.
- Council of Southern Caving Clubs - responsible for the Mendip Hills, West Wiltshire and The Isle of Portland.
- Derbyshire Caving Association - responsible for the Peak District, South Yorkshire, North Notts and Cheshire.
- Devon & Cornwall Underground Council - responsible for Devon and Cornwall.
- Forest of Dean Cave Conservation & Access Group (FoDCCAG) - responsible for the Forest of Dean and Gloucestershire

== Qualifications ==
The BCA offers qualifications such as Local Cave and Mine Leader (LCMLA), available at several levels, and a Cave Instructor Certificate (CIC).

== See also ==
- Caving in the United Kingdom
- List of cave rescue organizations § United Kingdom
