= British Cave Research Association =

- Abbreviation: BCRA
- Predecessor: British Speleological Association, Cave Research Group of Great Britain
- Formation: 1973
- Region served: United Kingdom
- Affiliations: British Caving Association
- Website: bcra.org.uk

The British Cave Research Association (BCRA) is a speleological organisation in the United Kingdom. Its object is to promote the study of caves and associated phenomena, and it attains this by supporting cave and karst research, encouraging original exploration (both in the UK and on expeditions overseas), collecting and publishing speleological information, maintaining a library and organising educational and scientific conferences and meetings.

BCRA is a registered charity in the UK, and a constituent body of the British Caving Association (BCA), undertaking charitable activities on behalf of BCA.

== History ==
The British Cave Research Association arose from a merger in 1973 of the British Speleological Association (BSA) and the Cave Research Group of Great Britain (CRG). When the National Caving Association (NCA) was formed in 1968, BCRA became one of its constituent bodies. Although NCA was recognised as the governing body for UK caving by the Sports Council it did not allow individual membership and so BCRA was seen by many as de facto the national body. This situation was resolved in 2005 when NCA was dissolved and a new body, the British Caving Association took over NCA's function as the governing body for UK caving (as recognised by the Sports Council). BCA consolidated various of the 'national body' services formerly provided by NCA and BCRA. At the start of 2006, a new membership structure limited BCRA membership to BCA members, who now pay a supplement to join BCRA.

Having passed on most of its functions to BCA, BCRA is now able to focus entirely on cave science, technology and heritage matters; the latter involving the cataloguing of the vast amount of library and archive material that BCRA has collected over the years.

== Publications ==
One of BCRA's main activities is publishing. It publishes the periodical Cave and Karst Science (three issues per year) and the annual BCRA Review. The BCRA Review replaces Speleology, which was published from 2003 to 2014, as BCRA's Bulletin. Prior to 2003, Speleology was published under the title Caves & Caving.

BCRA also publishes the Cave Studies series of booklets and manages various Special Interest Groups that also publish material, notably the Cave Radio & Electronics Group Journal.

In 2013 BCRA published the first volume of a major work, Caves and Karst of the Yorkshire Dales, edited by Tony Waltham and David Lowe, with Volume 2 published in 2017.

== Conference and meetings ==
In 1996 the UK's annual caving conference (the 'BCRA Conference') was given a face-lift and re-titled Hidden Earth. Although BCRA still underwrites the event, it is now billed as being jointly hosted by BCRA and BCA.

BCRA hosts an annual Science Symposium at which short papers are informally presented. Contributions are invited on any aspect of cave or karst science or caving technology and abstracts are published in Cave & Karst Science. BCRA has also hosted symposiums on Cave Technology, featuring contributions from its Special Interest Groups.

== Library ==
The British Caving Library (BCL) is a national research and reference library based in the Peak District, owned by BCRA and staffed part-time by a librarian. It mostly comprises published and archived material collected by BCRA and its predecessor organisations, with a minority of the items on long-term loan from clubs and individuals. The library function with the financial assistance of the British Caving Association, through which the library is able to offer its services to all cavers and to all those interested in cave science and related topics.

The library comprises a reference section and an archive section of older material. The reference section includes a large collection of books and journals on caving topics from Britain and abroad, which is frequently updated by donations and by journal exchanges with many caving clubs worldwide. Following an agreement with the National Geoscience Data Centre at the British Geological Survey (BGS), the archive material specifically relating to BCRA and its predecessor organisations was moved, in 2009, to BGS for safe-keeping in controlled storage conditions.

Some archive material has been digitised and made publicly available on the BCRA Online Archive. It includes the material referred to above, Cave Rescue Organisation archive material, and personal collections dating back to the 1930s.

For further information see the British Caving Library website, which includes an on-line catalogue of the collection, and an on-line audio archive.

== Cave survey grading system ==
BCRA produced a methodology in the 1960s to assess the accuracy, or grade, of a cave survey. It remains in common use today and is based on a scale of six grades.

== See also ==
- Caving in the United Kingdom
- French Federation of Speleology
- International Union of Speleology
- National Speleological Society (United States)
