= Phong Nha =

Phong Nha Xã Phong Nha
- Commune
- Phong Nha commune
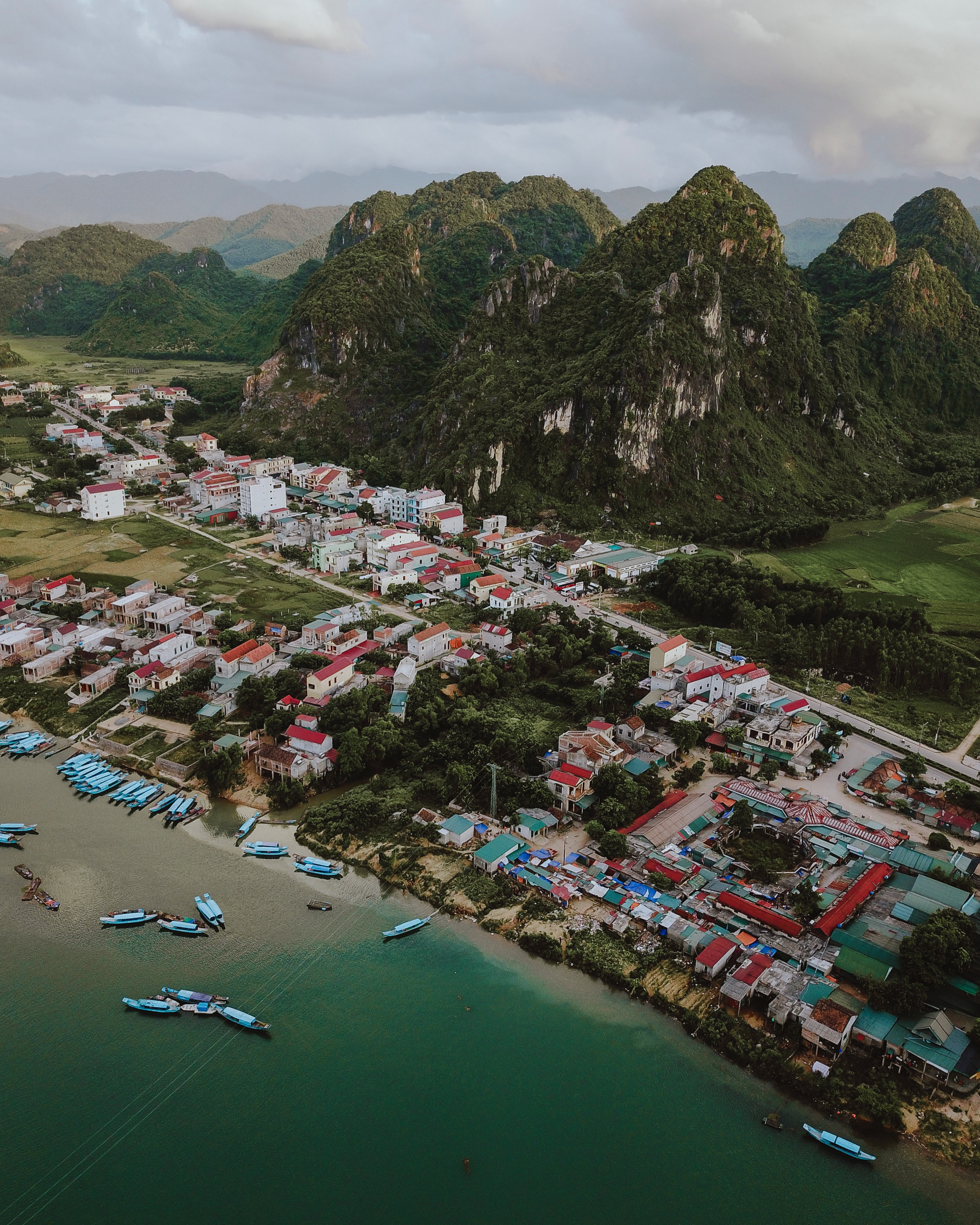

- Location in Vietnam
- Coordinates: 17°36′43″N 106°18′19″E
- Country: Vietnam
- Region: North Central Coast
- Province: Quảng Trị

Area
  - Total: 38.41 sq mi (99.48 km^{2})

Population
  - Total: 12.475
  - Density: 320/sq mi (125/km^{2})
- Time zone: UTC+7 (UTC + 7)

Phong Nha is a commune (xã) in Quảng Trị Province, North Central Coast Region of Vietnam. The commune was formerly the rural commune of Sơn Trạch.

On June 16, 2025, the Standing Committee of the National Assembly issued Resolution No. 1680/NQ-UBTVQH15 on the reorganization of commune-level administrative units in Quảng Trị Province in 2025. Accordingly, Phong Nha Township, together with Lâm Trạch Commune, Xuân Trạch Commune, and Phúc Trạch Commune, were merged to form a new commune named Phong Nha Commune.

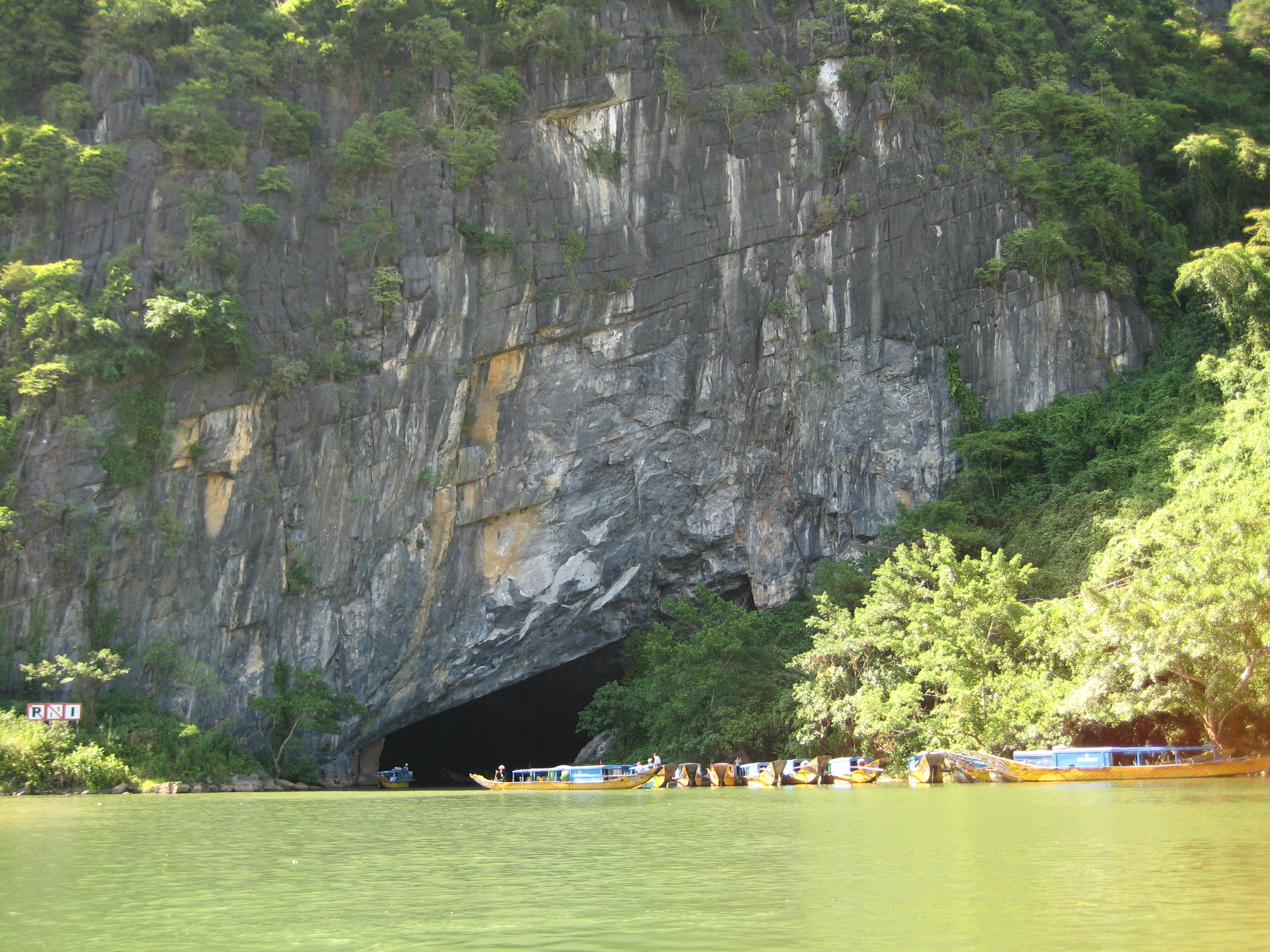
The entry of Phong Nha Cave

Phong Nha township is located by Son River and contains part of Phong Nha-Kẻ Bàng National Park, a UNESCO's World Heritage Site. Tourist service facilities for this national park are located in this township. Phong Nha was a fierce battlefield during the Vietnam War. The local inhabitants live mainly on agriculture and tourism.
