= Vietnam's Red Data Book =

Inventory of Vietnam's conservation status of biological species

Vietnam's Red Data Book (Vietnamese: Sách đỏ Việt Nam) is a list of rare and endangered species of fauna and flora native to Vietnam. This is the important legal basis for relating governmental regulations for the protection of biodiversity and wildlife in Vietnam. Criteria for this book are set forth on the basis of those specified by IUCN Red List.
