= Bắc Trạch =

Coordinates: 17°40′57″N 106°27′20″E

- Commune and village
- Interactive map of Bắc Trạch
- Country: Vietnam
- Province: Quảng Trị
- Time zone: UTC+07:00

Bắc Trạch is a commune (xã) and village in Quảng Trị Province, Vietnam.

On June 16, 2025, the Standing Committee of the National Assembly issued Resolution No. 1680/NQ-UBTVQH15 on the reorganization of commune-level administrative units in Quảng Trị Province in 2025. Accordingly, Thanh Trạch Commune, Hạ Mỹ Commune, Liên Trạch Commune, and Bắc Trạch Commune were merged to form a new commune named Bắc Trạch Commune.
