= List of railway stations in Vietnam =

Railway stations in Vietnam include

== North–South railway ==
| Station name | Km | City/district/province | Image |
|---|---|---|---|
| Hanoi | 0 | Hoàn Kiếm, Hanoi | |
| Giáp Bát | 5 | Hoàng Mai, Hanoi | |
| Văn Điển | 9 | Thanh Trì, Hanoi | |
| Thường Tín | 17 | Thường Tín, Hanoi | |
| Chợ Tía | 26 | Thường Tín, Hanoi | |
| Vạn Điểm | 30 | Thường Tín, Hanoi | |
| Phú Xuyên | 34 | Phú Xuyên, Hanoi | |
| Đồng Văn | 45 | Hà Nam | |
| Phủ Lý | 56 | Phủ Lý, Hà Nam | |
| Bình Lục | 67 | Bình Lục, Hà Nam | |
| Cầu Họ | 73 | Mỹ Lộc, Nam Định | |
| Đặng Xá | 81 | Mỹ Lộc, Nam Định | |
| Nam Định | 87 | Nam Định | |
| Trình Xuyên | 93 | Nam Định | |
| Núi Gôi | 101 | Vụ Bản, Nam Định | |
| Cát Đằng | 108 | Ý Yên, Nam Định | |
| Ninh Bình | 115 | Hoa Lư, Ninh Bình | |
| Cầu Yên | 120 | Hoa Lư, Ninh Bình | |
| Ghềnh | 125 | Tam Điệp, Ninh Bình | |
| Đồng Giao | 134 | Tam Điệp, Ninh Bình | |
| Bỉm Sơn | 141 | Bỉm Sơn, Thanh Hóa | |
| Đò Lèn | 152 | Hà Trung, Thanh Hóa | |
| Nghĩa Trang | 161 | Hoằng Hóa, Thanh Hóa | |
| Thanh Hóa | 175 | Thanh Hóa, Thanh Hóa | |
| Yên Thái | 187 | Thanh Hóa | |
| Minh Khôi | 197 | Nông Cống, Thanh Hóa | |
| Thị Long | 207 | | |
| Văn Trai | 219 | | |
| Khoa Trường | 229 | | |
| Trường Lâm | 238 | | |
| Hoàng Mai | 245 | Quỳnh Lưu, Nghệ An | |
| Cầu Giát | 261 | Quỳnh Lưu, Nghệ An | |
| Yên Lý | 272 | | |
| Chợ Sy | 279 | Nghệ An | |
| Mỹ Lý | 292 | | |
| Quán Hành | 309 | | |
| Vinh | 319 | Vinh, Nghệ An | |
| Yên Xuân | 330 | Nghệ An | |
| Yên Trung | 340 | Đức Thọ, Hà Tĩnh | |
| Đức Lạc | 345 | Đức Thọ, Hà Tĩnh | |
| Yên Duệ | 351 | Vũ Quang, Hà Tĩnh | |
| Hòa Duyệt | 358 | Vũ Quang, Hà Tĩnh | |
| Thanh Luyện | 370 | Hương Khê, Hà Tĩnh | |
| Chu Lễ | 381 | Hương Khê, Hà Tĩnh | |
| Hương Phố | 387 | Hương Khê (town), Hà Tĩnh | |
| Phúc Trạch | 396 | Hương Khê, Hà Tĩnh | |
| La Khê | 404 | Tuyên Hóa, Quảng Bình | |
| Tân Ấp | 409 | Tuyên Hóa, Quảng Bình | |
| Đồng Chuối | 415 | Tuyên Hóa, Quảng Bình | |
| Kim Lũ | 426 | Tuyên Hóa, Quảng Bình | |
| Đồng Lê | 436 | Tuyên Hóa, Quảng Bình | |
| Ngọc Lâm | 450 | Tuyên Hóa, Quảng Bình | |
| Lạc Sơn | 449 | Tuyên Hóa, Quảng Bình | |
| Lệ Sơn | 467 | Tuyên Hóa, Quảng Bình | |
| Minh Lệ | 482 | Quảng Trạch, Quảng Bình | |
| Ngân Sơn | 489 | Bố Trạch, Quảng Bình | |
| Thọ Lộc | 499 | Bố Trạch, Quảng Bình | |
| Hoàn Lão | 507 | Quảng Bình | |
| Phúc Tự | 511 | Bố Trạch, Quảng Bình | |
| Đồng Hới | 522 | Đồng Hới, Quảng Bình | |
| Lệ Kỳ | 529 | Quảng Ninh (district), Quảng Bình | |
| Long Đại | 539 | Quảng Ninh, Quảng Bình | |
| Mỹ Đức | 551 | Lệ Thủy, Quảng Bình | |
| Phú Hòa | 559 | Lệ Thủy, Quảng Bình | |
| Mỹ Trạch | 565 | Lệ Thủy, Quảng Bình | |
| Thượng Lâm | 572 | Lệ Thủy, Quảng Bình | |
| Sa Lung | 588 | Vĩnh Linh, Quảng Trị | |
| Tiên An | 599 | Vĩnh Linh, Quảng Trị | |
| Hà Thanh | 610 | Gio Châu, Quảng Trị | |
| Đông Hà | 622 | Đông Hà, Quảng Trị | |
| Quảng Trị | 634 | Quảng Trị, Quảng Trị | |
| Diên Sanh | 643 | Hải Lăng, Quảng Trị | |
| Mỹ Chánh | 652 | Hải Lăng, Quảng Trị | |
| Phò Trạch | 660 | Phong Điền, Thừa Thiên Huế | |
| Hiền Sỹ | 670 | Phong Điền, Thừa Thiên Huế | |
| Văn Xá | 678 | Hương Trà, Thừa Thiên Huế | |
| Huế | 688 | Huế, Thừa Thiên Huế | |
| Hương Thủy | 699 | Phú Bài, Thừa Thiên Huế | |
| Truồi | 715 | Phú Lộc, Thừa Thiên Huế | |
| Cầu Hai | 729 | Phú Lộc, Thừa Thiên Huế | |
| Thừa Lưu | 742 | Phú Lộc, Thừa Thiên Huế | |
| Lăng Cô | 755 | Phú Lộc, Thừa Thiên Huế | |
| Hải Vân Bắc (North of Hải Vân) | 761 | Liên Chiểu, Đà Nẵng | |
| Hải Vân | 766 | | |
| Hải Vân Nam (South of Hải Vân) | 772 | | |
| Kim Liên | 777 | Liên Chiểu, Đà Nẵng | |
| Thanh Khê | 788 | Thanh Khê, Đà Nẵng | |
| Đà Nẵng | 791 | Đà Nẵng | |
| Lệ Trạch | 804 | Hòa Vang, Đà Nẵng | |
| Nông Sơn | 814 | Điện Bàn, Quảng Nam | |
| Trà Kiệu | 825 | Duy Sơn, Quảng Nam | |
| Phú Cang | 842 | Thăng Bình, Quảng Nam | |
| An Mỹ | 857 | Tam Kỳ, Quảng Nam | |
| Tam Kỳ | 865 | Tam Kỳ, Quảng Nam | |
| Diêm Phổ | 879 | Núi Thành, Quảng Nam | |
| Núi Thành | 890 | Núi Thành, Quảng Nam | |
| Trị Bình | 901 | Bình Sơn, Quảng Ngãi | |
| Bình Sơn | 909 | Bình Sơn, Quảng Ngãi | |
| Đại Lộc | 920 | Sơn Tịnh, Quảng Ngãi | |
| Quảng Ngãi | 928 | Quảng Ngãi, Quảng Ngãi | |
| Hòa Vinh Tây | 940 | Quảng Ngãi | |
| Mộ Đức | 949 | | |
| Thạch Trụ | 959 | Đức Phổ, Quảng Ngãi | |
| Đức Phổ | 968 | Đức Phổ, Quảng Ngãi | |
| Thủy Trạch | 977 | Quảng Ngãi | |
| Sa Huỳnh | 991 | Đức Phổ, Quảng Ngãi | |
| Tam Quan | 1004 | Hoài Nhơn, Bình Định | |
| Bồng Sơn | 1017 | Hoài Nhơn, Bình Định | |
| Vạn Phú | 1033 | Phù Mỹ, Bình Định | |
| Phù Mỹ | 1049 | Phù Mỹ, Bình Định | |
| Khánh Phước | 1060 | Phù Cát, Bình Định | |
| Phù Cát | 1071 | Phù Cát, Bình Định | |
| Bình Định | 1085 | An Nhơn, Bình Định | |
| Diêu Trì | 1096 | Tuy Phước, Bình Định | |
| Tân Vinh | 1111 | Vân Canh, Bình Định | |
| Vân Canh | 1123 | Hương Canh, Bình Định | |
| Phước Lãnh | 1139 | Đồng Xuân, Phú Yên | |
| La Hai | 1154 | Đồng Xuân, Phú Yên | |
| Chí Thạnh | 1170 | Tuy An, Phú Yên | |
| Hòa Đa | 1184 | Tuy An, Phú Yên | |
| Tuy Hòa | 1198 | Tuy Hòa, Phú Yên | |
| Đông Tác | 1202 | Tuy Hòa, Phú Yên | |
| Phú Hiệp | 1210 | Đông Hòa, Phú Yên | |
| Hảo Sơn | | | |
| Đại Lãnh | 1232 | Vạn Ninh, Khánh Hòa | |
| Tu Bông | 1242 | Vạn Ninh, Khánh Hòa | |
| Giã | 1254 | Vạn Ninh, Khánh Hòa | |
| Hòa Huỳnh | 1270 | | |
| Ninh Hòa | 1281 | Ninh Hòa, Khánh Hòa | |
| Phong Thạnh | 1287 | Ninh Hòa, Khánh Hòa | |
| Lương Sơn | 1303 | Nha Trang, Khánh Hòa | |
| Nha Trang | 1315 | Nha Trang, Khánh Hòa | |
| Cây Cầy | 1329 | Diên Khánh, Khánh Hòa | |
| Hòa Tân | 1341 | Cam Ranh, Khánh Hòa | |
| Suối Cát | 1351 | Cam Ranh, Khánh Hòa | |
| Ngã Ba | 1364 | Cam Ranh, Khánh Hòa | |
| Kà Rôm | 1381 | Ninh Thuận | |
| Phước Nhơn | 1398 | Ninh Thuận | |
| Tháp Chàm | 1408 | Phan Rang, Ninh Thuận | |
| Hòa Trinh | 1420 | Ninh Phước, Ninh Thuận | |
| Cà Ná | 1436 | | |
| Vĩnh Tân | | | |
| Vĩnh Hảo | 1455 | Bình Thuận | |
| Sông Lòng Sông | 1465 | Tuy Phong, Bình Thuận | |
| Sông Mao | 1484 | Bắc Bình, Bình Thuận | |
| Châu Hanh | 1494 | | |
| Sông Lũy | 1506 | Bắc Bình, Bình Thuận | |
| Long Thạnh | 1523 | Hàm Thuận Bắc, Bình Thuận | |
| Ma Lâm | 1533 | Hàm Thuận Bắc, Bình Thuận | |
| Phan Thiết | | Phan Thiết, Bình Thuận | |
| Bình Thuận | 1551 | Hàm Thuận Nam, Bình Thuận | |
| Suối Vận | 1567 | | |
| Sông Phan | 1582 | Bình Thuận | |
| Sông Dinh | 1595 | Bình Thuận | |
| Suối Kiết | 1603 | Tánh Linh, Bình Thuận | |
| Gia Huynh | 1614 | Tánh Linh, Bình Thuận | |
| Trảng Táo | 1620 | Xuân Lộc, Đồng Nai | |
| Gia Ray | 1631 | Đồng Nai | |
| Bảo Chánh | 1640 | | |
| Long Khánh | 1649 | Xuân Lộc, Đồng Nai | |
| Dầu Giây | 1661 | Đồng Nai | |
| Trảng Bom | 1678 | Thống Nhất, Đồng Nai | |
| Hố Nai | 1688 | | |
| Biên Hòa | 1697 | Biên Hòa, Đồng Nai | |
| Dĩ An | 1707 | Dĩ An, Bình Dương | |
| Sóng Thần | 1711 | Dĩ An, Bình Dương | |
| Bình Triệu | 1718 | Thủ Đức, Ho Chi Minh City | |
| Gò Vấp | 1722 | Gò Vấp, Ho Chi Minh City | |
| Saigon | 1726 | District 3, Ho Chi Minh City | |

== Hanoi–Haiphong railway ==
| Station name | Km | City/district/province |
|---|---|---|
| Hanoi | 0 | Hoàn Kiếm, Hanoi |
| Long Biên | 2 | Hoàn Kiếm, Hanoi |
| Gia Lâm | 5,44 | Long Biên, Hanoi |
| Cầu Bây | 10,77 | Long Biên, Hanoi |
| Phú Thụy | 16,21 | Gia Lâm, Hanoi |
| Lạc Đạo | 24,8 | Văn Lâm, Hưng Yên |
| Tuấn Lương | 32,56 | Văn Lâm, Hưng Yên |
| Cẩm Giàng | 40,14 | Cẩm Giàng, Hải Dương |
| Cao Xá | 50,87 | Cẩm Giàng, Hải Dương |
| Hải Dương | 57,01 | Hải Dương |
| Tiền Trung | 63,6 | Hải Dương, Hải Dương |
| Lai Khê | 68 | Kim Thành, Hải Dương |
| Phạm Xá | 71,25 | Kim Thành, Hải Dương |
| Phú Thái | 78,25 | Kim Thành, Hải Dương |
| Dụ Nghĩa | 86,11 | An Dương, Haiphong |
| Vật Cách | 91,25 | An Dương, Haiphong |
| Thượng Lý | 97,64 | Hồng Bàng, Haiphong |
| Hai Phong | 101,75 | Ngô Quyền, Haiphong |

== Bac Hong - Van Dien Railway ==
| Station name | Km |
|---|---|
| Văn Điển | Km 8+930 |
| Hà Đông | Km 28+772 |
| Phú Diễn | Km 15+050 |
| Kim Nỗ | Km 3+923 |
| Bắc Hồng | Km 26+870 |

== Hanoi-Dong Dang Railway ==
| Station name | Km |
|---|---|
| Hanoi | 0 |
| Long Biên | 2 |
| Gia Lâm | 5 |
| Yên Viên | 11 |
| Từ Sơn | 17 |
| Lim | 24 |
| Bắc Ninh | 29 |
| Thị Cầu | 32 |
| Sen Hồ | 39 |
| Bắc Giang | 49 |
| Phố Tráng | 59 |
| Kép | 69 |
| Voi Xô | 75 |
| Phố Vị | 81 |
| Bắc Lệ | 89 |
| Sông Hòa | 99 |
| Chi Lăng | 106 |
| Đồng Mỏ | 113 |
| Bắc Thủy | 125 |
| Bản Thí | 135 |
| Yên Trạch | 143 |
| Lạng Sơn | 149 |
| Đồng Đăng | 162 |

== Hanoi–Lào Cai railway ==
| Station name | Km |
|---|---|
| Hanoi | 0 |
| Long Biên | 2 |
| Gia Lâm | 5 |
| Yên Viên | 10 |
| Cổ Loa | 18 |
| Đông Anh | 21 |
| Bắc Hồng | 26 |
| Thạch Lỗi | 33 |
| Phúc Yên | 38 |
| Hương Canh | 47 |
| Vĩnh Yên | 53 |
| Hướng Lại | 62 |
| Bạch Hạc | 68 |
| Việt Trì | 72 |
| Phủ Đức | 81 |
| Tiên Kiên | 90 |
| Phú Thọ | 99 |
| Chí Chủ | 108 |
| Vũ Ẻn | 118 |
| Ấm Thượng | 130 |
| Đoan Thượng | 140 |
| Văn Phú | 148 |
| Yên Bái | 155 |
| Cổ Phúc | 165 |
| Ngòi Hóp | 177 |
| Mậu A | 186 |
| Mậu Đông | 194 |
| Trái Hút | 201 |
| Lâm Giang | 210 |
| Lang Khay | 218 |
| Lang Thíp | 227 |
| Bảo Hà | 236 |
| Thái Văn | 247 |
| Cầu Nhô | 253 |
| Phố Lu | 261 |
| Lạng | 269 |
| Thái Niên | 276 |
| Làng Giàng | 282 |
| Lào Cai | 293 |
