= Tuyên Hóa district =

Coordinates: 17.917°N 106.000°E

Tuyên Hóa district Huyện Tuyên Hóa
- District
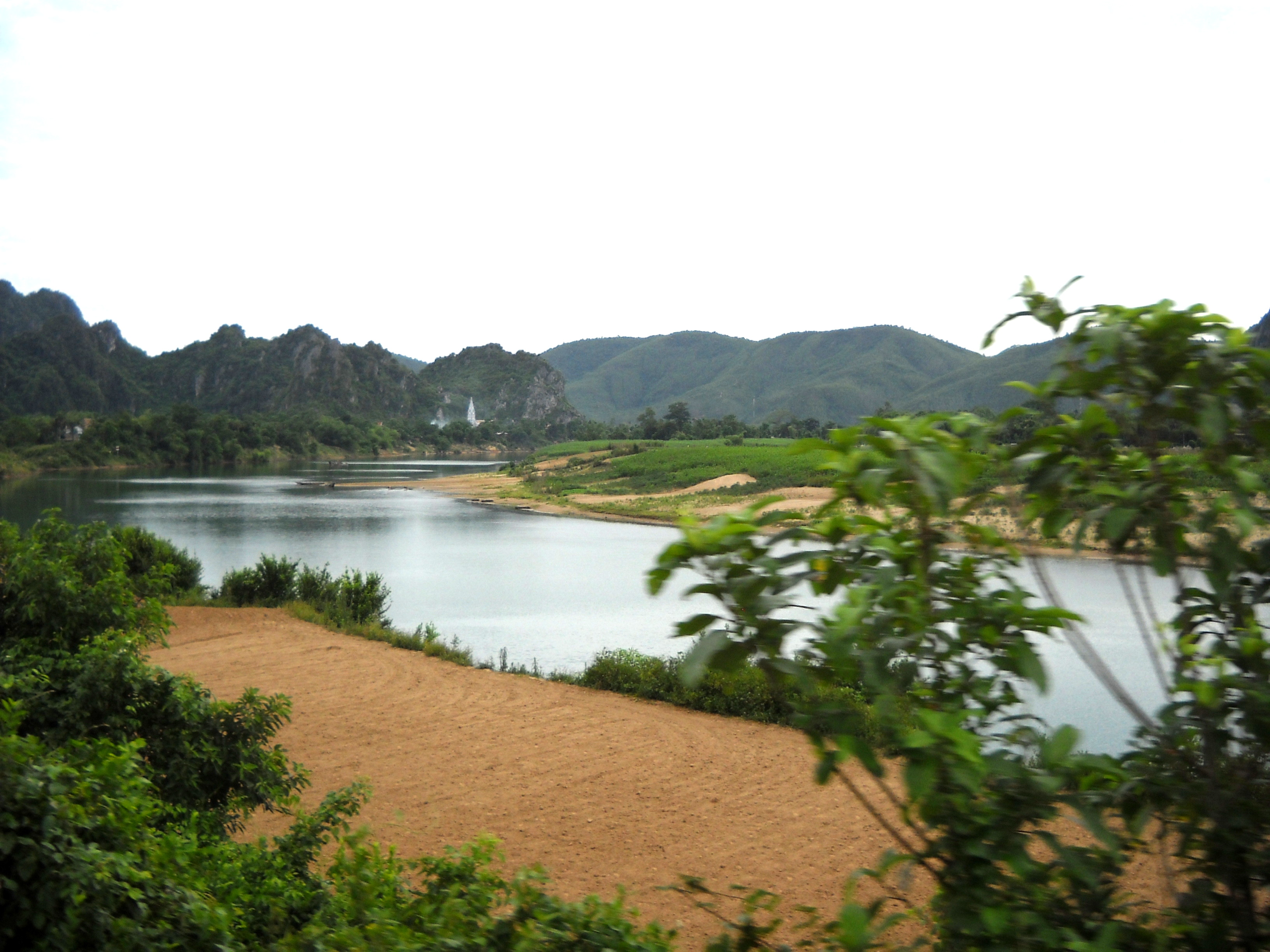
- View of Gianh River
- Interactive map of Tuyên Hóa district
- Country: Vietnam
- Region: North Central Coast
- Province: Quảng Bình
- Capital: Đồng Lê

Area
  - Total: 444 sq mi (1,149 km^{2})

Population (2003)
  - Total: 78,933
- Time zone: UTC+7 (Indochina Time)

Tuyên Hóa is a former rural district of Quảng Bình province in the North Central Coast region of Vietnam. Its seat is the town of Đồng Lê. Speakers of the Nguồn language (which is related to Mường) are mostly located near Đồng Lê. As of 2003, the district had a population of 78,933. The district covers an area of 1,149 km^{2}. The district capital lies at Đồng Lê.

== Administrative divisions ==
The district is divided into one township, Đồng Lê, and 19 communes: Lâm Hóa, Hương Hóa, Thanh Hóa, Thanh Thạch, Kim Hóa, Sơn Hóa, Lê Hóa, Thuận Hóa, Đồng Hóa, Thạch Hóa, Nam Hóa, Đức Hóa, Phong Hóa, Mai Hóa, Ngư Hóa, Tiến Hóa, Châu Hóa, Cao Quảng and Văn Hóa.

== Climate ==
Climate data for Tuyên Hóa
Month	Jan	Feb	Mar	Apr	May	Jun	Jul	Aug	Sep	Oct	Nov	Dec	Year
Record high °C (°F)	34.5 (94.1)	37.9 (100.2)	39.6 (103.3)	43.1 (109.6)	41.6 (106.9)	41.6 (106.9)	40.4 (104.7)	40.0 (104.0)	38.0 (100.4)	37.0 (98.6)	36.4 (97.5)	34.1 (93.4)	43.1 (109.6)
Mean daily maximum °C (°F)	21.8 (71.2)	23.1 (73.6)	26.4 (79.5)	31.0 (87.8)	33.8 (92.8)	34.2 (93.6)	34.2 (93.6)	33.3 (91.9)	31.2 (88.2)	28.1 (82.6)	25.0 (77.0)	22.0 (71.6)	28.7 (83.7)
Daily mean °C (°F)	17.9 (64.2)	19.2 (66.6)	21.7 (71.1)	25.2 (77.4)	27.8 (82.0)	29.2 (84.6)	29.2 (84.6)	28.2 (82.8)	26.3 (79.3)	23.9 (75.0)	21.3 (70.3)	18.5 (65.3)	24.0 (75.2)
Mean daily minimum °C (°F)	15.7 (60.3)	17.0 (62.6)	18.9 (66.0)	21.8 (71.2)	24.1 (75.4)	25.6 (78.1)	25.5 (77.9)	24.8 (76.6)	23.5 (74.3)	21.6 (70.9)	19.0 (66.2)	16.3 (61.3)	21.2 (70.2)
Record low °C (°F)	5.0 (41.0)	5.6 (42.1)	7.2 (45.0)	12.4 (54.3)	16.3 (61.3)	18.0 (64.4)	20.7 (69.3)	19.7 (67.5)	17.1 (62.8)	13.9 (57.0)	10.3 (50.5)	5.0 (41.0)	5.0 (41.0)
Average precipitation mm (inches)	47.1 (1.85)	39.6 (1.56)	51.9 (2.04)	75.0 (2.95)	154.6 (6.09)	130.2 (5.13)	142.7 (5.62)	267.3 (10.52)	501.2 (19.73)	654.6 (25.77)	223.7 (8.81)	83.6 (3.29)	2,365.5 (93.13)
Average rainy days	14.6	13.1	12.8	10.9	12.1	9.5	9.9	14.5	17.4	19.8	17.2	14.8	166.5
Average relative humidity (%)	90.3	90.1	88.3	84.9	80.3	75.2	74.1	80.0	87.2	89.9	89.6	89.6	84.9
Mean monthly sunshine hours	64.2	62.9	97.8	141.5	196.9	204.2	209.1	172.6	123.1	97.1	71.4	54.4	1,483.9
Source: Vietnam Institute for Building Science and Technology
