= Hoàng Long =

Hoàng Long may refer to:

- Hoàng Long, Phú Xuyên, a commune in Phú Xuyên District, Hanoi
- Hoàng Long, Gia Lâm, a village in Đặng Xá commune, Gia Lâm district, Hanoi
- Nho Quan district, a district in Ninh Bình province previously named Hoàng Long

== See also ==
- Huanglong (disambiguation)
