= Paul-Marie Cao Ðình Thuyên =

Vietnamese Roman Catholic prelate (1927–2022)

His Excellency Paul-Marie Cao Ðình Thuyên
- Bishop of Vinh
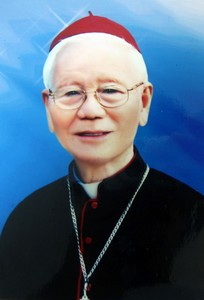
- Native name: Phaolô Maria Cao Đình Thuyên
- Metropolis: Hà Nội
- See: Vinh
- Appointed: 6 July 1992 (as Coadjutor)
- Installed: 11 December 2000
- Term ended: 13 May 2010
- Predecessor: Pierre-Jean Trần Xuân Hạp
- Successor: Paul Nguyễn Thái Hợp
- Previous post: Coadjutor Bishop of Vinh (1992–2000)

Orders
- Ordination: 14 May 1960 by Jean Baptiste Trần Hữu Ðức
- Consecration: 19 November 1992 by Pierre-Jean Trần Xuân Hạp

Personal details
- Born: 7 January 1927 Hương Khê, Hà Tĩnh, French Indochina
- Died: 29 August 2022 (aged 95) Vinh, Vietnam
- Motto: Christo confixus sum Cruci (With Christ I am nailed to the Cross)
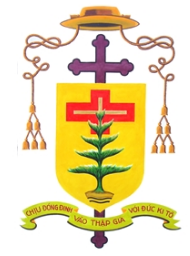
- Coat of arms

Styles of Paul-Marie Cao Ðinh Thuyên
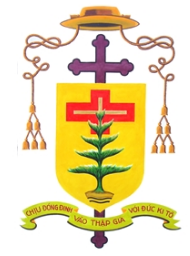
- Reference style: His Excellency; The Most Reverend
- Spoken style: Your Excellency
- Religious style: Bishop

Paul-Marie Cao Ðinh Thuyên (7 January 1927 – 29 August 2022) was a Roman Catholic prelate from Vietnam.

Cao Ðihn Thuyên was born in Vietnam and was ordained to the priesthood in 1960. He served as coadjutor bishop and diocese bishop of the Diocese of Vinh from 1992 until his retirement in 2010.

Catholic Church titles
Preceded by Pierre-Jean Trần Xuân Hạp	Bishop of Vinh; 2000–2010	Succeeded by Paul Nguyễn Thái Hợp
