= Phú Xuyên, Hanoi =

Phú Xuyên
- Commune
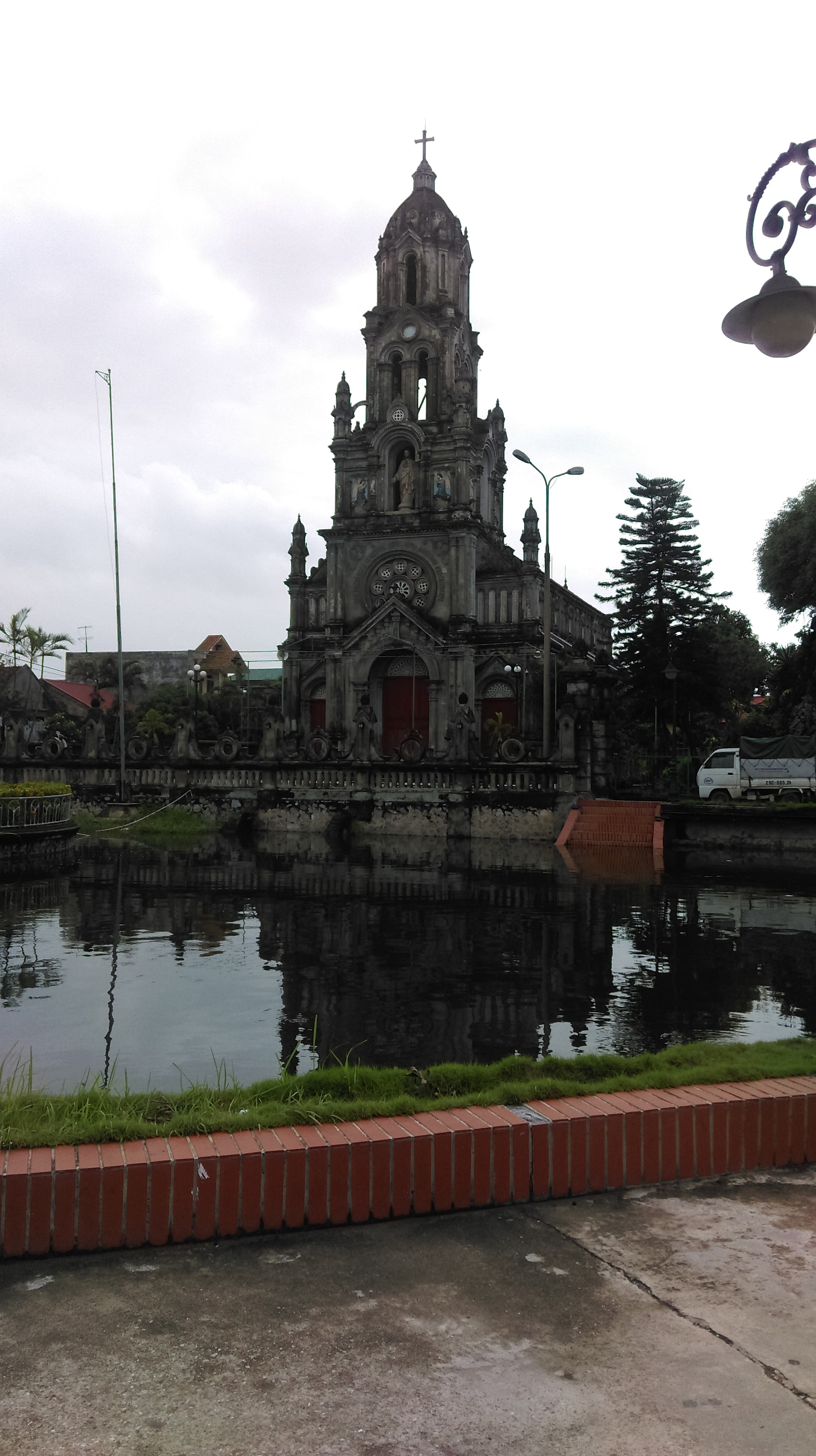
- Phú Mỹ Parish Church
- Interactive map of Phú Xuyên
- Coordinates: 20.74623639158606°N 105.91333723118343°E
- Country: Vietnam
- Region: Red River Delta
- Municipality: Hanoi
- Administrative headquarters: Thao Chính Hamlet

Area
  - Total: 60.02 km^{2} (23.17 sq mi)

Population (2025)
  - Total: 96,635
  - Density: 1,610/km^{2} (4,200/sq mi)
- Website: phuxuyen.hanoi.gov.vn

Phú Xuyên is a commune in the municipality of Hanoi, Vietnam.

On 16 June 2025, district-level administrative units nationwide ceased to operate.

On the same date, the Standing Committee of the National Assembly of Vietnam issued Resolution No. 1656/NQ-UBTVQH15 on the arrangement of commune-level administrative units in Hanoi in 2025. Under the resolution, the entire area and population of Phú Minh township, Phú Xuyên township, Hồng Thái Commune, Minh Cường Commune, Nam Phong Commune, Nam Tiến Commune, Quang Hà Commune, Văn Tự Commune, the remaining area of Tô Hiệu Commune, and Vạn Nhất Commune were merged to form a new commune named Phú Xuyên. The former communes and townships were located in Phú Xuyên district and Thường Tín district.
