= Bắc Bình =

Bắc Bình Xã Bắc Bình Phan Rí Thành, (Note: Also known as Phanri-Citadelle in French during the French Indochina, means Citadel of Phan Rí in English) Chợ Lầu
- Commune
- Bắc Bình commune
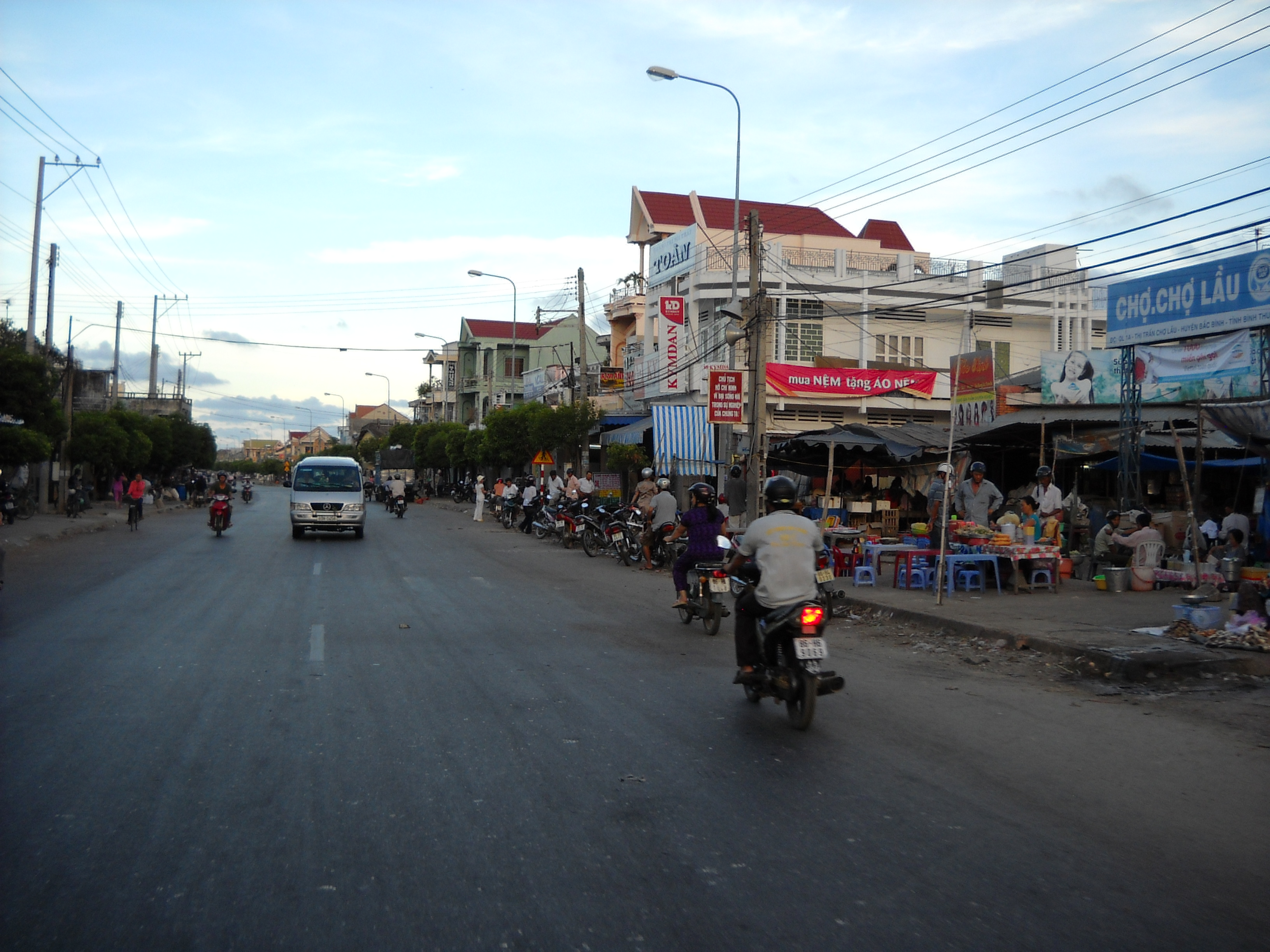
- Chợ Lầu Market on National Route 1A in the Chợ Lầu downtown area

- Location within Vietnam
- Coordinates: 11°13′15″N 108°30′35″E
- Country: Vietnam
- Region: South Central Coast
- Province: Lâm Đồng

Area
  - Total: 57.53 sq mi (148.99 km^{2})

Population (2024)
  - Total: 51,344
  - Density: 892.55/sq mi (344.61/km^{2})
- Time zone: UTC+7 (Indochina Time)
- Administrative code: 23005

Bắc Bình is a commune (xã) of Lâm Đồng Province, Vietnam. It is one of the 124 new wards, communes and special zones of the province following the reorganization in 2025.

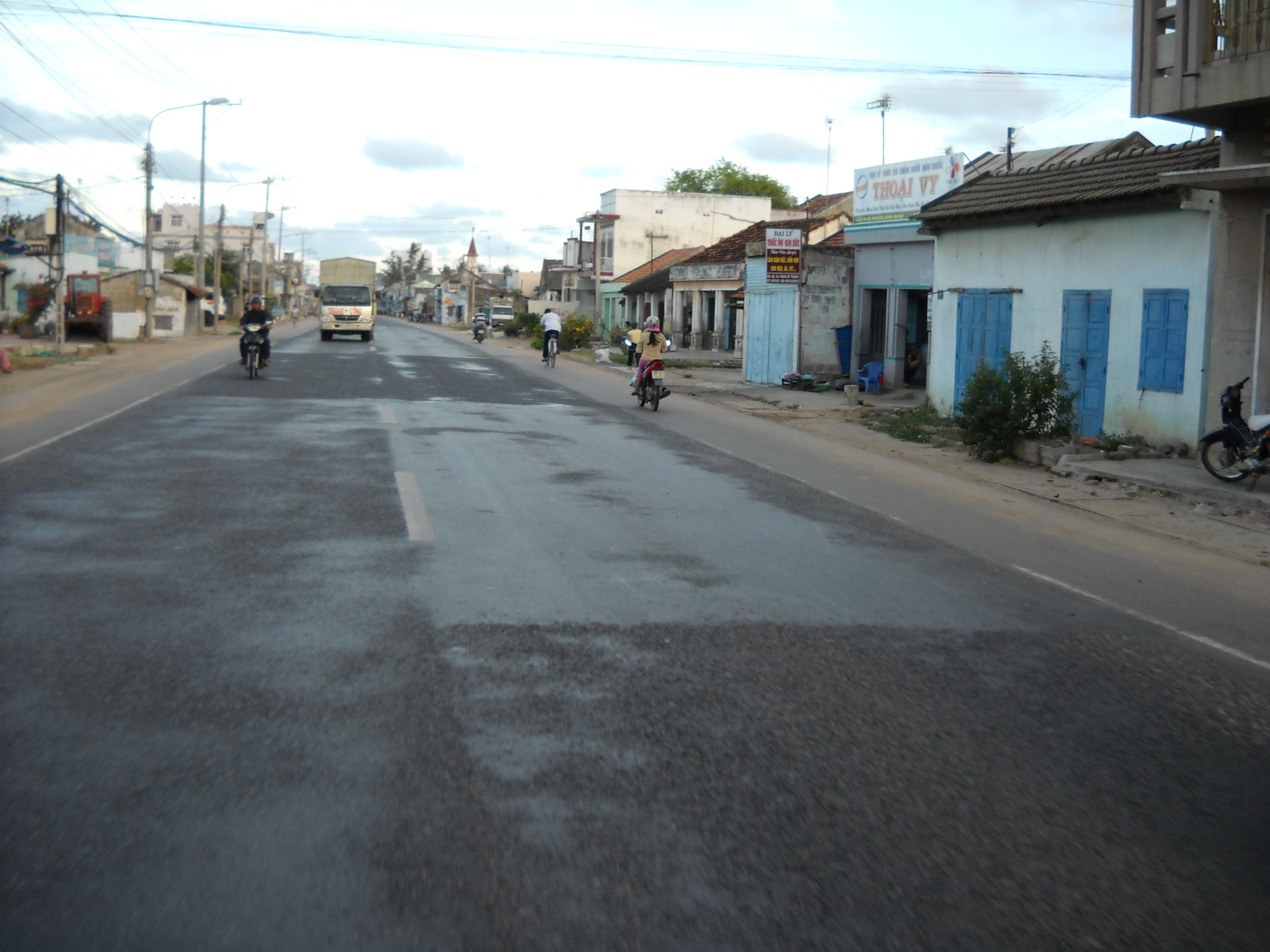
National Route 1 in former Phan Rí Thành commune

The commune was formed after the merger of commune-level town of Chợ Lầu with communes of Phan Hòa, Phan Hiệp and Phan Rí Thành of the former Bắc Bình district, Bình Thuận province.

== Division ==
Bắc Bình commune is divided into 16 villages of: Bình Đức, Bình Hiếu, Bình Hòa, Bình Lễ, Bình Long, Bình Liêm, Bình Minh, Bình Thắng, Bình Thủy, Bình Tiến, Hiệp Phước, Hòa Thuận, Xuân An 1, Xuân An 2, Xuân Hội, Xuân Quang.

== History ==
On February 24, 1976, the Provisional Revolutionary Government of the Republic of South Vietnam issued a decree on the dissolution of districts and the consolidation of provinces in South Vietnam. Accordingly, Thuận Hải province was established based on the natural area and population size of the provinces of Ninh Thuận, Bình Thuận và Bình Tuy.

At that time, the area of Bắc Bình commune consisted of the communes of Chợ Lầu, Phan Hòa, Phan Hiệp and Phan Rí Thành of Bắc Bình district of Thuận Hải province.

On December 30, 1982, the Council of Ministers issued Decision 204-HĐBT on the demarcation of boundaries of some districts and towns in Thuận Hải province. Accordingly:

- Establish Bắc Bình district of Thuận Hải province based on the natural area and population size of the:
1. 14 communes of Bắc Bình district are: Phan Rí Thành, Chợ Lầu, Lương Sơn, Bình Tân, Sông Luỹ, Phan Sơn, Phan Thanh, Hồng Thái, Phạn Hiệp, Phan Hoà, Phan Lâm, Phan Điền, Hải Ninh and Hoà Thắng
2. Commune of Hồng Phong of Hàm Thuận district.
- After its establishment, Bắc Bình district comprised the following communes: Bình Tân, Chợ Lầu, Hải Ninh, Hòa Thắng, Hồng Phong, Hồng Thái, Lương Sơn, Phan Điền, Phan Hiệp, Phan Hòa, Phan Lâm, Phan Rí Thành, Phan Sơn, Phan Thanh and Sông Lũy.
- From that, the communes of Chợ Lầu, Phan Hòa, Phan Hiệp and Phan Rí Thành is under Bắc Bình district of Thuận Hải province.

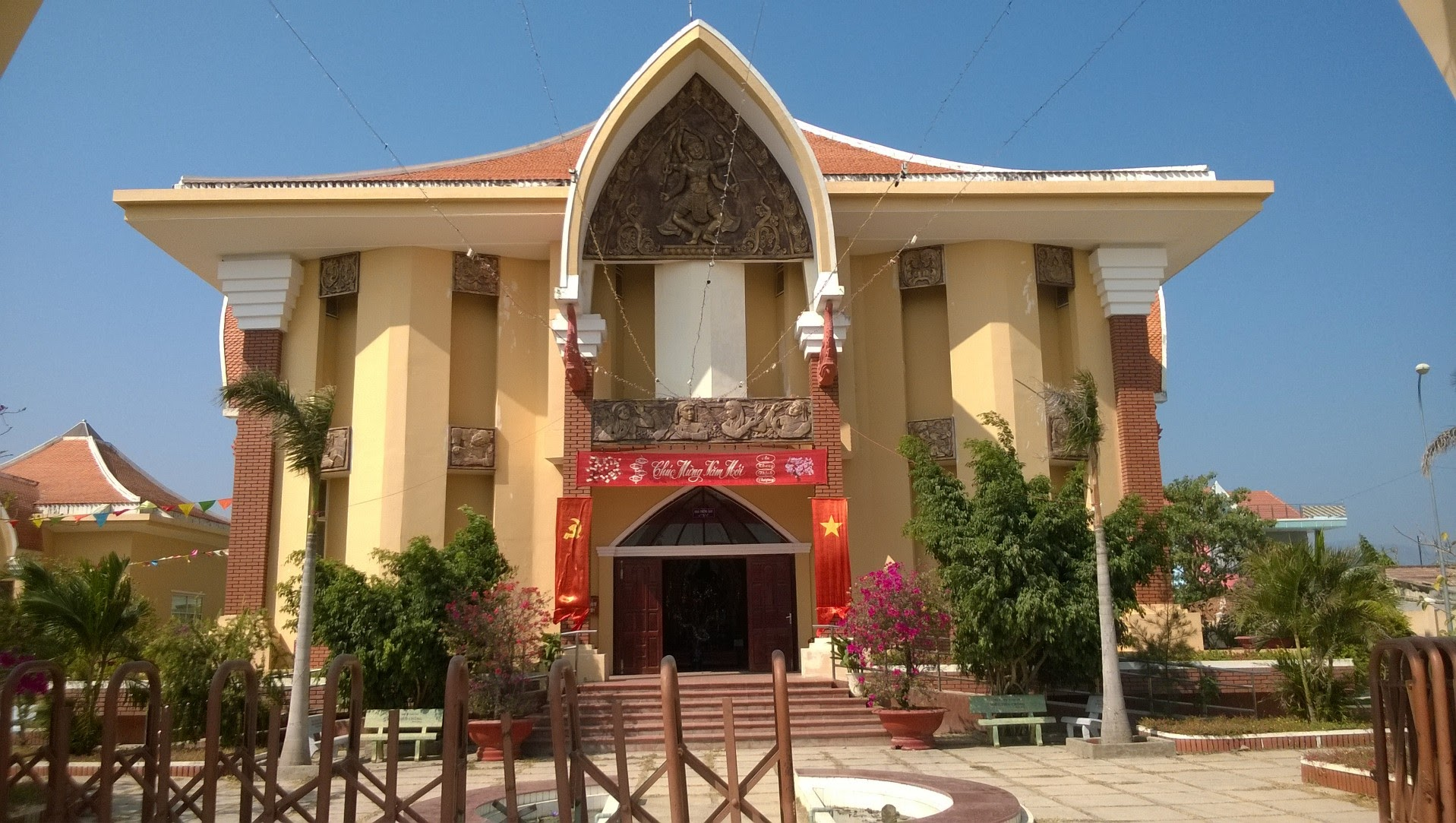
Bình Thuận Chams Cultural Exhibition Center in former Phan Hiệp commune

On December 26, 1991, The 10th session of the 8th National Assembly issued a resolution on redefining the administrative boundaries of some provinces. Accordingly, Thuận Hải province was divided into two provinces:

- Ninh Thuận province, consists of: Phan Rang–Tháp Chàm town and 3 districts of: Ninh Sơn, Ninh Hải, Ninh Phước.
- Bình Thuận province, consists of: Phan Thiết town and 8 districts of: Tuy Phong, Bắc Bình, Hàm Thuận Bắc, Hàm Thuận Nam, Hàm Tân, Đức Linh, Tánh Linh, Phú Quý.

At this time, the communes of Chợ Lầu, Phan Hòa, Phan Hiệp and Phan Rí Thành is under Bắc Bình district, Bình Thuận province.

In 1992, the Government Organization Committee issued Decision 488/1992/QD-TCCP on the establishment of Chợ Lầu town as the district capital of Bắc Bình district, Bình Thuận province. Accordingly:

- Chợ Lầu town is established based on the natural area and population size of the Chợ Lầu commune.
- Simultaneously, this is the capital town of Bắc Bình disitrct.

On June 12, 2025, the 15th National Assembly issued Resolution No. 202/2025/QH15 on the rearrangement of provincial-level administrative units. Accordingly, the entire natural area and population size of the provinces of Lâm Đồng province, Bình Thuận province and Đắk Nông were rearranged into a new province called Lâm Đồng province.

On June 16, 2025, the Standing Committee of the National Assembly issued Resolution No. 1671/NQ-UBTVQH15 on the reorganization of commune-level administrative units in Lâm Đồng province in 2025. Accordingly, the entire natural area and population of Chợ Lầu town and the communes of Phan Hòa, Phan Hiệp, Phan Rí Thành (Bắc Bình district) is reorganized into a new commune named Bắc Bình commune.
