= 富川 =

富川 may refer to:

- Bucheon (부천), a city in Gyeonggi Province, South Korea
- Fuchuan, an autonomous county in Guangxi, China
- Phú Xuyên, a district in Hanoi, Vietnam
- Tomikawa (disambiguation), Japanese place name and surname

== See also ==
- The dictionary definition of 富 at Wiktionary
- The dictionary definition of 川 at Wiktionary
