= Đặng Xá station =

Railway station in Vietnam

Coordinates: 20.4416°N 106.1188°E

Đặng Xá station is a railway station on North–South railway at Km 81 in Vietnam. It's located in Mỹ Lộc, Nam Định between Cầu Họ station and Nam Định station.
