= Lộc Thủy =

Lộc Thủy may refer to several places in Vietnam, including:

- Lộc Thủy, Quảng Bình, a rural commune of Lệ Thủy District.
- Lộc Thủy, Thừa Thiên-Huế, a rural commune of Phú Lộc District.
