= An Thủy =

An Thủy may refer to several places in Vietnam, including:

- An Thủy, Bến Tre, a rural commune of Ba Tri District.
- An Thủy, Quảng Bình, a rural commune of Lệ Thủy District.
