= Ngọc Hồi =

- Commune
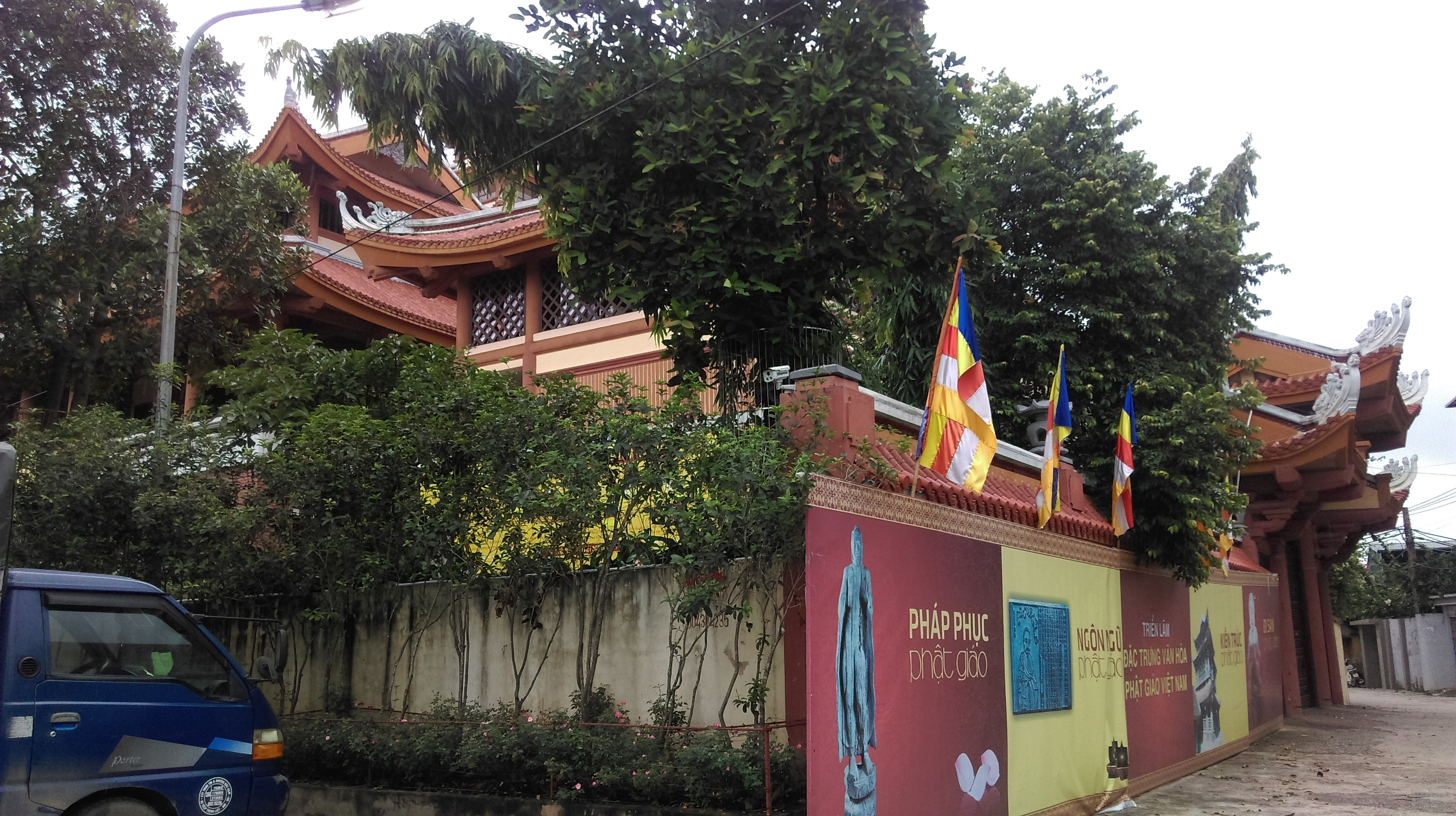
- Yên Phú Pagoda
- Interactive map of Ngọc Hồi
- Coordinates: 20.90813103715279°N 105.8306841593721°E
- Country: Vietnam
- Region: Red River Delta
- Municipality: Hanoi
- Administrative headquarters: Đại Áng Hamlet

Area
  - Total: 13.34 km^{2} (5.15 sq mi)

Population (2025)
  - Total: 43,864
  - Density: 3,289/km^{2} (8,520/sq mi)
- Website: ngochoi.hanoi.gov.vn

Ngọc Hồi is a commune in the municipality of Hanoi, Vietnam. The area was the site of the Battle of Ngọc Hồi, a notable event in Vietnamese history.

On 16 June 2025, district-level administrative units nationwide ceased to operate.

On the same date, the Standing Committee of the National Assembly of Vietnam issued Resolution No. 1656/NQ-UBTVQH15 on the arrangement of commune-level administrative units in Hanoi in 2025. Under the resolution, the entire area and population of Ngọc Hồi Commune, parts of Duyên Thái Commune, Đại Áng Commune, and Khánh Hà Commune, and the remaining area of Liên Ninh Commune were merged to form a new commune named Ngọc Hồi. The former communes were located in Thanh Trì district and Thường Tín district.
