= Diocese of Vinh =

Roman Catholic diocese in Vietnam

Coordinates: 18°40′N 105°40′E

Diocese of Vinh Dioecesis Vinhensis Giáo phận Vinh

Catholic
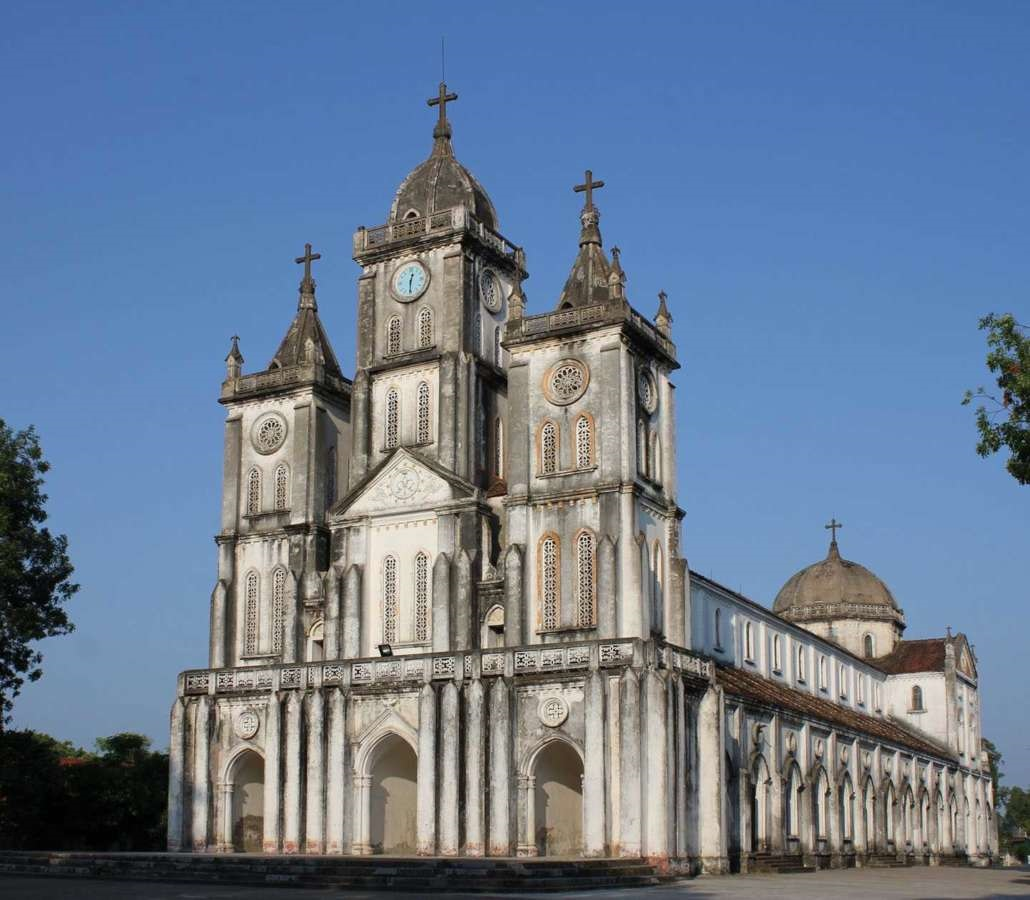
- Xã Đoài Cathedral (2021)

Location
- Country: Vietnam
- Territory: Nghệ An
- Ecclesiastical province: Hà Nội

Statistics
- Area: 16,493 km^{2} (6,368 sq mi)
- Population: Total; Catholics: (as of 2022); 3,547,000; 303,702 (8.6%)
- Parishes: 132

Information
- Denomination: Roman Catholic
- Sui iuris church: Latin Church
- Rite: Roman Rite
- Established: 27 March 1846 - Established as Apostolic Vicariate; 24 November 1960 - Promoted as Diocese
- Cathedral: Our Lady of the Assumption Cathedral (Xã Đoài)
- Patron saint: Our Lady of the Assumption
- Secular priests: 211

Current leadership
- Pope: Leo XIV
- Bishop: Alphonse Nguyễn Hữu Long PSS
- Metropolitan Archbishop: Joseph Vũ Văn Thiên
- Auxiliary Bishops: Pierre Nguyễn Văn Viên

Website
- giaophanvinh.net

The Diocese of Vinh (Latin: Dioecesis Vinhensis) is a Roman Catholic diocese in central Vietnam. The Most Reverend Alphonse Nguyễn Hữu Long was appointed bishop on December 22, 2018.

The diocese covers an area of 16,499 km^{2}, and is a suffragan diocese of the Archdiocese of Hanoi.

Assumption Cathedral at Xã Đoài in Nghi Diên commune is the cathedral of the diocese.

== History ==
The circuit (trấn) of Nghệ An was evangelized by Jesuit missionaries as early as in 1629, especially by Girolamo Maiorica. After the Apostolic Vicariate of Tonkin (Đàng Ngoài) was created in 1659, MEP missionaries were assigned to Nghệ An trấn. In 1846, the Vicariate of South Tonkin (Nam Đàng Ngoài) was established, covering the area of Nghệ An and Hà Tĩnh provinces as well as northern Quảng Bình province. It has been renamed Vinh in 1924 and elevated to a diocese in 1960. In 2006, the other part of Quảng Bình province, south of Gianh River and Son River, was officially transferred from Archdiocese of Huế to the Diocese of Vinh after decades under Vinh's de facto supervision following the Partition of Vietnam. After being split to establish the Diocese of Hà Tĩnh in 2018, the Diocese of Vinh currently covers Nghệ An Province only.

== Ordinaries ==
=== Vicars Apostolic of Southern Tonking (1846-1924) ===
Vicar apostolic		Period in office	Status	Reference
1	Bishop Jean-Denis Gauthier, M.E.P.	March 27, 1846 – December 08, 1877	Died in office	
2	Bishop Yves-Marie Croc, M.E.P.	December 08, 1877 – October 11, 1885	Died in office	
3	Bishop Louis-Marie Pineau, M.E.P.	May 21, 1886 – June 02, 1910	Resigned	
4	Bishop François Belleville, M.E.P.	February 09, 1911 – July 07, 1912	Died in office	
5	Bishop André-Léonce-Joseph Eloy, M.E.P.	December 11, 1912 – December 03, 1924	Remained as vicar apostolic of Vinh.	

=== Vicars Apostolic of Vinh (1924-1960) ===
Vicar apostolic		Period in office	Status	Reference
5	Bishop André-Léonce-Joseph Eloy, M.E.P.	December 03, 1924 – July 30, 1947	Died in office	
6	Bishop Jean-Baptiste Trần Hữu Ðức	June 14, 1951 – November 24, 1960	Remained as bishop of Vinh.	

=== Bishops of Vinh (1960-present) ===
Bishop		Coat of Arms	Period in office	Status	Reference
1	Bishop Jean-Baptiste Trần Hữu Ðức		November 24, 1960 – January 05, 1971	Died in office	
2	Bishop Pierre-Marie Nguyễn Năng		January 05, 1971 – July 06, 1978	Died in office	
3	Bishop Pierre-Jean Trần Xuân Hạp		January 10, 1979 – December 11, 2002	Resigned	
4	Bishop Paul-Marie Cao Ðình Thuyên		December 11, 2002 – May 13, 2010	Resigned	
5	Bishop Paul Nguyễn Thái Hợp, O.P.		May 13, 2010 – December 22, 2018	Resigned	
6	Bishop Alphonse Nguyễn Hữu Long, P.S.S.		December 22, 2018 – present	Current bishop	

Coadjutor Vicar Apostolics of Southern Tonking (1848-1877)

Coadjutor Vicar Apostolic		Period in office	Reference
1	Bishop Guillaume-Clément Masson, M.E.P.	May 23, 1848 – July 24, 1853	
2	Bishop Yves-Marie Croc, M.E.P.	September 04, 1866 – December 08, 1877	

Coadjutor Bishops of Vinh (1963-2000)

Coadjutor Bishops		Coat of Arms	Period in office	Reference
1	Bishop Paul Trần Ðình Nhiên		February 05, 1963 – March 24, 1969	
2	Bishop Paul-Marie Cao Ðình Thuyên		July 06, 1992 – December 11, 2000	
