= Dương Văn An =

16th-century Vietnamese historian

- Born: 1514; Tuy Lộc Village, Lộc Thủy Commune, Lệ Thủy district, Quảng Bình province
- Known for: Ô Châu cận lục

Dương Văn An (1514 – ?; courtesy name: Tỉnh Phú, 楊文安) was a minister in the cabinet of the Mạc dynasty. He was born in 1514 in Tuy Lộc Village, Lộc Thủy Commune, Lệ Thủy district, Quảng Bình province. He was the author of a geography-history book about Ô province, Ô Châu cận lục (chữ Hán: 烏州近錄 (literally: Recent records of Ô province)). Though Ô province was in fact from now Quảng Bình to Quảng Nam provinces, the book recorded the history and geography of today Quảng Bình, Quảng Trị and Thừa Thiên–Huế provinces.
