= Tánh Linh =

Tánh Linh Xã Tánh Linh
- Commune
- Tánh Linh commune
- Location within Vietnam
- Coordinates: 11°05′00″N 107°40′54″E
- Country: Vietnam
- Region: South Central Coast
- Province: Lâm Đồng
- Time zone: UTC+7 (UTC + 7)

Tánh Linh is a commune (xã) of Lâm Đồng Province, Vietnam. It is one of the 124 new wards, communes and special zones of the province following the reorganization in 2025.

On June 16, 2025, the Standing Committee of the National Assembly issued Resolution No. 1671/NQ-UBTVQH15 on the arrangement of commune-level administrative units in Lâm Đồng province in 2025. Accordingly, the entire natural area and population of Lạc Tánh township and the communes of Gia An and Đức Thuận (Tánh Linh district) were merged to form a new commune named Tánh Linh Commune.
