= Phan Thiết station =

Railway station in Vietnam

Phan Thiết
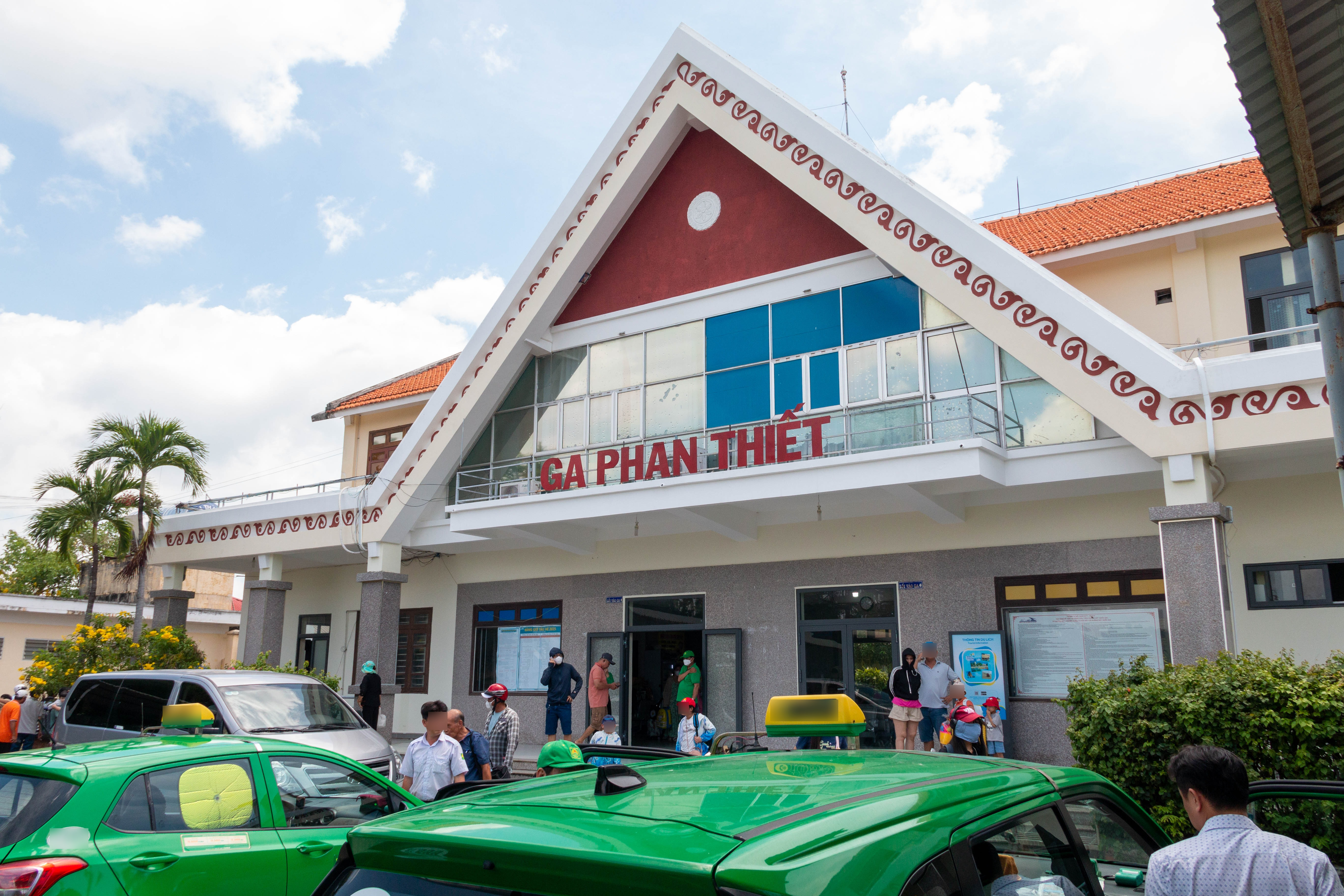

General information
- Location: Vietnam
- Coordinates: 10°56′30″N 108°04′57″E
Location

Phan Thiết station is a subsidiary station of Saigon station at the fishing town of Phan Thiết. It is where the North–South railway begins to follow the beachfront northbound, all the way up to Huế Railway Station.

== History ==
In 1899 a company was formed to build the line Phan Rang–Tháp Chàm to Đà Lạt, then via Ninh Chữ Beach to Tây Nguyên, which in 1903 built a warehouse in the station area at Phan Thiết. In 1920 Biên Hòa–Tháp Chàm was connected passing via Phan Thiết and a station house was constructed. From 1948 to 1950 the line between Ninh Hòa, Phan Thiết, and Nha Trang was secured by a special French Foreign Legion armoured train called La Rafale. In 2012 Phan Thiết Railway Station was relocated to a site outside the town adjacent to National Route 1.

== See also ==
- Bình Triệu station
