= Pierre Nguyễn Văn Viên =

Vietnamese Catholic prelate (born 1965)

The Most Reverend Pierre Nguyễn Văn Viên
- Auxiliary Bishop of Vinh
- Official portrait, 2024
- Native name: Phêrô Nguyễn Văn Viên
- Province: Hà Nội
- Diocese: Vinh
- Appointed: 15 June 2013
- Installed: 4 September 2013
- Other post: Titular Bishop of Megalopolis in Proconsulari
- Previous post: Apostolic Administrator of Hưng Hóa (2020-2022)

Orders
- Ordination: 3 October 1999
- Consecration: 4 September 2013 by Paul Nguyễn Thái Hợp OP, Joseph Nguyễn Năng, Michael Joseph McKenna

Personal details
- Born: 8 January 1965 (age 61) Quảng Bình province, Vietnam
- Denomination: Catholic
- Education: Vinh Thanh Major Seminary; Catholic College of Education Sydney
- Motto: Pacem Meam do vobis (My peace I give unto you) (Thầy ban cho anh em bình an của Thầy)
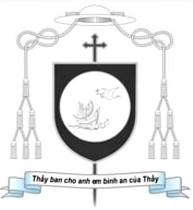
- Coat of arms: Pierre Nguyễn Văn Viên's coat of arms

Pierre Nguyễn Văn Viên is a Vietnamese Catholic prelate serving as an auxiliary bishop of the Diocese of Vinh since 2013.

== Early life and education ==
Nguyen was born in Quảng Bình province, Vietnam on 8 January 1965. He served in the army as a conscript. He acquired a doctorate in economics from the University of Agronomy, Hue.

== Priesthood ==
On 3 October 1999, Nguyen was ordained a priest. After ordination, he worked in Australia among Vietnamese immigrants. He acquired his doctorate in theology in Australia.

== Episcopate ==
Nguyen was appointed Auxiliary Bishop of the Roman Catholic Diocese of Vinh and Titular Bishop of the Megalopolis in Proconsulari (Titular See) on 15 June 2013 and consecrated as a bishop on 4 September 2013 by Bishop Paul Nguyễn Thái Hợp. He was appointed Apostolic Administrator of the Roman Catholic Diocese of Hưng Hóa on 29 August 2020.
