= Huanglong =

Huanglong (Chinese: 黄龙; lit. 'Yellow Dragon') may refer to:

- Yellow Dragon, Chinese mythology
- Huanglong Prefecture, an important city in Liao dynasty (916–1125) and Jin dynasty (1115–1234), located in today's Changchun, Jilin.

== Places ==
- Huanglong County, Yan'an, Shaanxi
- Huanglong Scenic and Historic Interest Area, scenic area in Songpan County, Sichuan
  - Jiuzhai Huanglong Airport, an airport in Songpan County, Sichuan
- Yellow Dragon Cave (Hangzhou), Hangzhou, Zhejiang
  - Yellow Dragon Sports Center, Hangzhou, Zhejiang

=== Towns ===
- Huanglong, Anhui, in Huaining County, Anhui
- Huanglong, Shiyan, in Zhangwan District, Shiyan, Hubei
- Huanglong, Xiangyang, in Xiangyang, Hubei
- Huanglong, Xinning, in Xinning County, Hunan
- Huanglong, Dayu County, in Dayu County, Jiangxi

=== Townships ===
- Huanglong Township, Xiushui County, in Xiushui County, Jiangxi
- Huanglong Township, Guangyuan, in Guangyuan, Sichuan
- Huanglong Township, Ngawa Tibetan and Qiang Autonomous Prefecture, in Songpan County, Sichuan
- Huanglong Township, Yuechi County, a township in Yuechi County, Sichuan
- Huanglong Township, Zhejiang, in Shengsi County, Zhejiang

== Chinese era names ==
- Huanglong (49BC), an era name used by Emperor Xuan of Han
- Huanglong (229–231), an era name used by Sun Quan, emperor of Eastern Wu

== See also ==
- Hoàng Long (disambiguation)
