= Phú Xuyên station =

Railway station in Vietnam

Coordinates: 20.7369°N 105.9129°E

Phú Xuyên station Ga Phú Xuyên

General information
- Location: Phú Xuyên Commune, Hanoi; Vietnam
- Owner: Hanoi Railways
- Platforms: 3
- Tracks: 3
Location

Phú Xuyên station (Vietnamese: Ga Phú Xuyên) is a railway station on the North–South railway and is located in Phú Xuyên, Hanoi.
