= Trình Xuyên station =

Is a railway station on North–South railway at Km 93 in Vietnam

Trình Xuyên station is a railway station on North–South railway at Km 93 in Vietnam. It's located in Vụ Bản, Nam Định between Nam Định station and Núi Gôi station.
