= Thường Tín station =

Railway station in Vietnam

Coordinates: 20.8713°N 105.8644°E

Thường Tín station Ga Thường Tín

General information
- Location: Vietnam
- Owner: Hanoi Railways
- Line: 3

Other information
- Classification: 4
Location

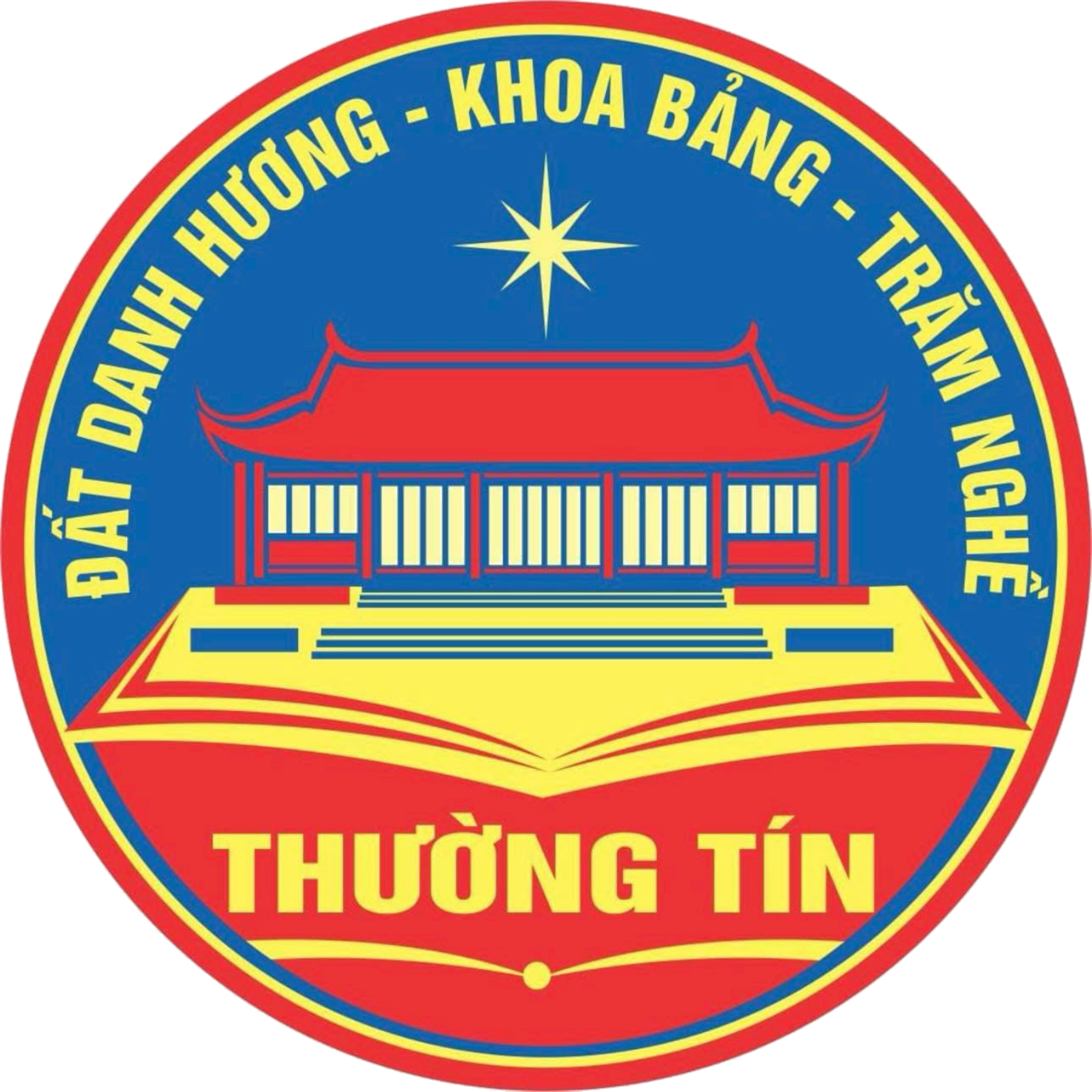
Thường Tín District seal

Thường Tín station (Vietnamese: Ga Thường Tín) is a railway station in Thường Tín town, Thường Tín district, Hanoi. It's located near National Route 1 on the North–South railway.
