= Ninh Hòa station =

Railway station in Hanoi, Vietnam

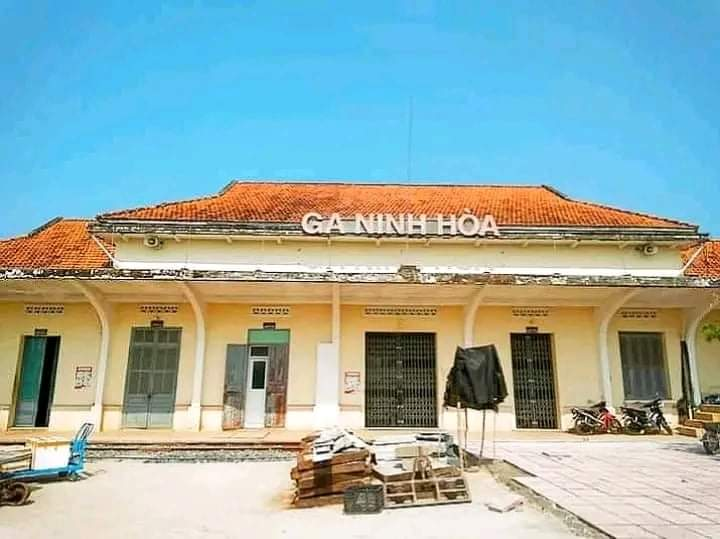

General information
- Location: Ninh Hiệp ward, Ninh Hòa, Khánh Hòa; Vietnam
- Coordinates: 12°29′20″N 109°7′22″E
- Line: North – South railway
Location

Ninh Hòa station (Vietnamese: Ga Ninh Hòa) is a railway station on North–South railway. It is located in Ninh Hòa, Khánh Hòa province, Vietnam.

There is both passenger and freight services at the station. Passenger pick-up was temporarily suspended in July 2021 to deal with epidemic control related to COVID-19.
