= Bình Lục station =

Railway station in Vietnam

Bình Lục station Ga Bình Lục

General information
- Location: Bình Mỹ, Hà Nam; Vietnam
- Coordinates: 20°29′35″N 105°59′50″E
- Line: North - South Railway
Location

Bình Lục station is a railway station in Bình Mỹ, Bình Lục, Hà Nam at Km 67 on North–South railway. It serve the district of Bình Lục, Hà Nam.
