= Tuyên Lâm =

Coordinates: 17°58′52″N 105°46′08″E

Tuyên Lâm village Xã Tuyên Lâm
- Rural commune and village
- Interactive map of Tuyên Lâm village
- Country: Vietnam
- Province: Quảng Trị
- Time zone: UTC+07:00 (Indochina Time)

Tuyên Lâm is a rural commune (xã) and village in Quảng Trị Province, in Vietnam.

On June 16, 2025, the Standing Committee of the National Assembly issued Resolution No. 1680/NQ-UBTVQH15 on the reorganization of commune-level administrative units in Quảng Trị Province in 2025. Accordingly, Lâm Hóa Commune and Thanh Hóa Commune were merged to form a new commune named Tuyên Lâm Commune.
