= Bắc Bình district =

Coordinates: 11.333°N 108.417°E

Bắc Bình, Bình Thuận, VietNam Huyện Bắc Bình
- District
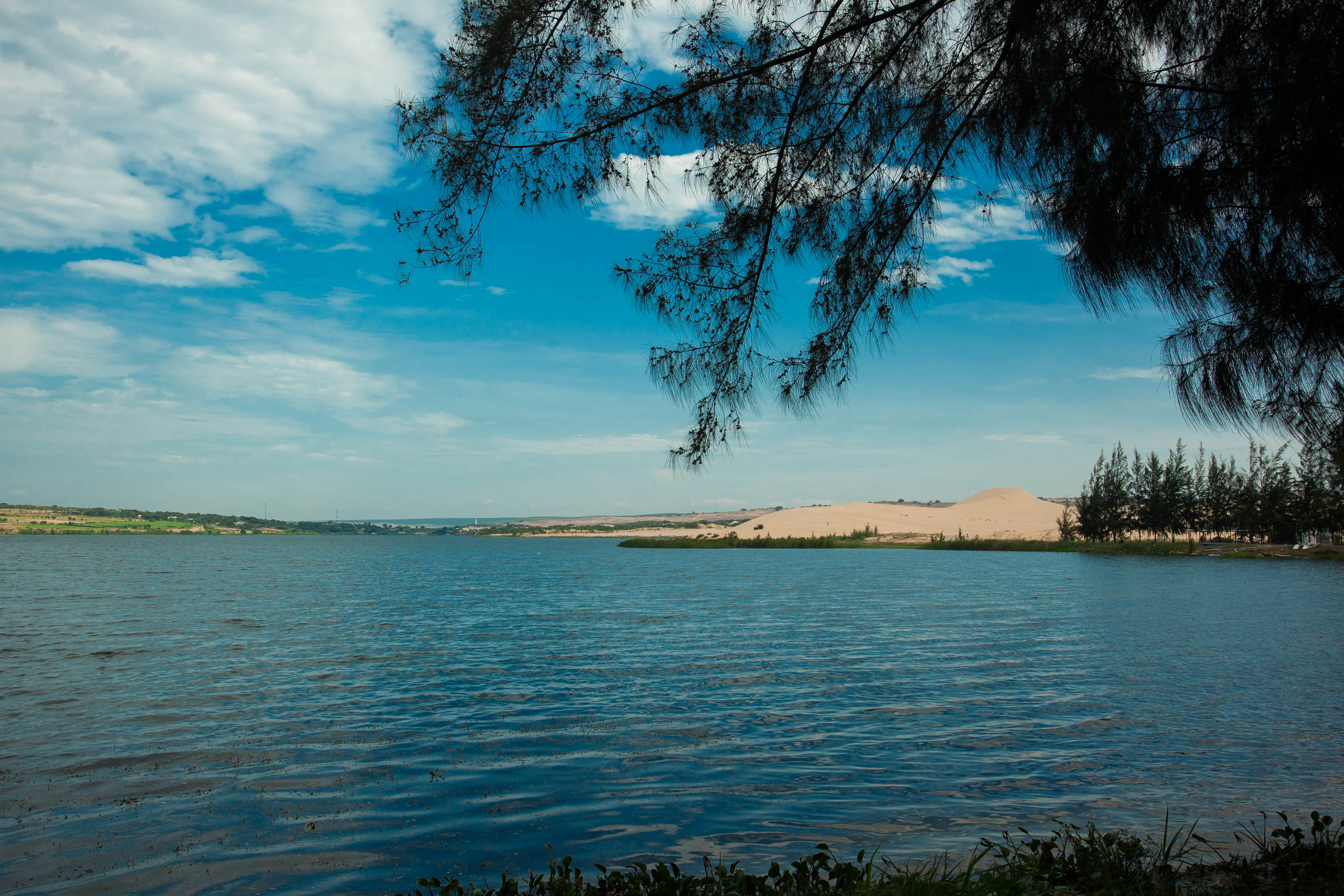
- Chợ Lầu town centre

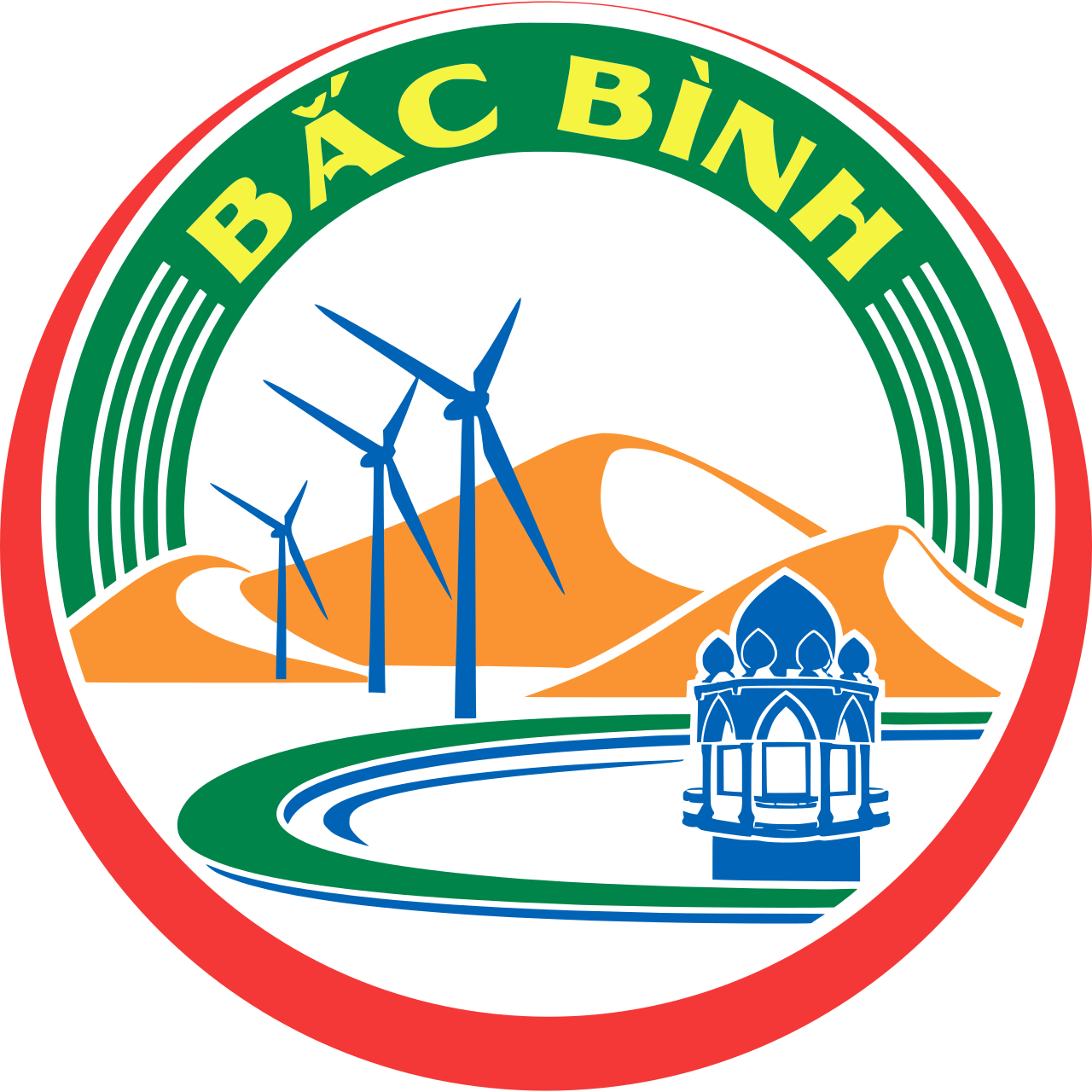
- Seal
- Interactive map of Bắc Bình, Bình Thuận, VietNam
- Country: Vietnam
- Region: Southeast
- Province: Bình Thuận
- Capital: Chợ Lầu

Area
  - District: 417 sq mi (1,079 km^{2})

Population (2019 census)
  - District: 129,374
  - Density: 310.5/sq mi (119.9/km^{2})
  - Urban: 27,798
  - Rural: 101,576
- Time zone: UTC+07:00 (Indochina Time)

Bắc Bình is a former rural district of Bình Thuận province in the Southeast region of Vietnam. As of 2019 the district had a population of 129,374. The district covers an area of 1,079 km^{2}. The district capital lies at Chợ Lầu.
