= Mỹ Lý station =

Railway station in Diễn Châu, Nghệ An, Vietnam

Mỹ Lý station is a railway station on North–South railway at Km 292 in Vietnam. It's located in Diễn Châu, Nghệ An between Chợ Sy station and Quán Hành station.
