= Đồng Văn station =

Railway station in Vietnam

Coordinates: 20.6389°N 105.9189°E

Đồng Văn station Ga Đồng Văn

General information
- Location: Duy Tiên, Hà Nam; Vietnam
- Tracks: 3
Location

Đồng Văn station (Vietnamese: Ga Đồng Văn) is a railway station on the North–South railway in Duy Tiên, Hà Nam, Vietnam.
