= Hoàng Long, Gia Lâm =

Hoàng Long is an agricultural village in Đặng Xá commune, Gia Lâm district, Hanoi, Vietnam. In 2004 the Economic and Rural Development Section of Gia Lâm embarked on a project to use modern techniques to produce cleaner vegetables in an environmentally friendlier way.
