= Hoàng Long, Phú Xuyên =

- Commune
- Interactive map of Hoàng Long, Phú Xuyên
- Coordinates: 20.754743°N 105.832600°E
- Country: Vietnam
- Municipality: Hanoi
- District: Phú Xuyên
- Time zone: UTC+7 (UTC+7)

Hoàng Long is a former commune (xã) in Phú Xuyên District, Hanoi, Vietnam.

== Geography ==
Hoàng Long commune has an area of 10.57 km², the population in 1999 was 8,764 people, the population density reached 829 people/km². It includes 9 villages (thôn) and 1 residential cluster (cụm dân cư):

- Village: Viên Hoàng
- Village: Thanh Xuyên
- Village: Cổ Hoàng
- Village: Đào Xá
- Village: Hoàng Đông
- Village: Kim Long Thượng
- Village: Kim Long Nội
- Village: Kim Long Trung
- Village: Nhị Khê
- Residential cluster: Chợ Đồng Vàng
