= Tuyên Sơn =

Coordinates: 17.9875°N 105.8667°E

- Commune and village
- Interactive map of Tuyên Sơn
- Country: Vietnam
- Province: Quảng Trị
- Time zone: UTC+07:00

Tuyên Sơn is a commune (xã) and village in Quảng Trị Province, in Vietnam. Tuyên Sơn has an area of 30 km², a population of 2,312 people in 2019, and a population density of 77 people per km².

On June 16, 2025, the Standing Committee of the National Assembly issued Resolution No. 1680/NQ-UBTVQH15 on the reorganization of commune-level administrative units in Quảng Trị Province in 2025. Accordingly, Thanh Thạch Commune and Hương Hóa Commune were merged to form a new commune named Tuyên Sơn Commune.
