= Văn Điển station =

Railway station on the North-South Railway in Vietnam

Văn Điển
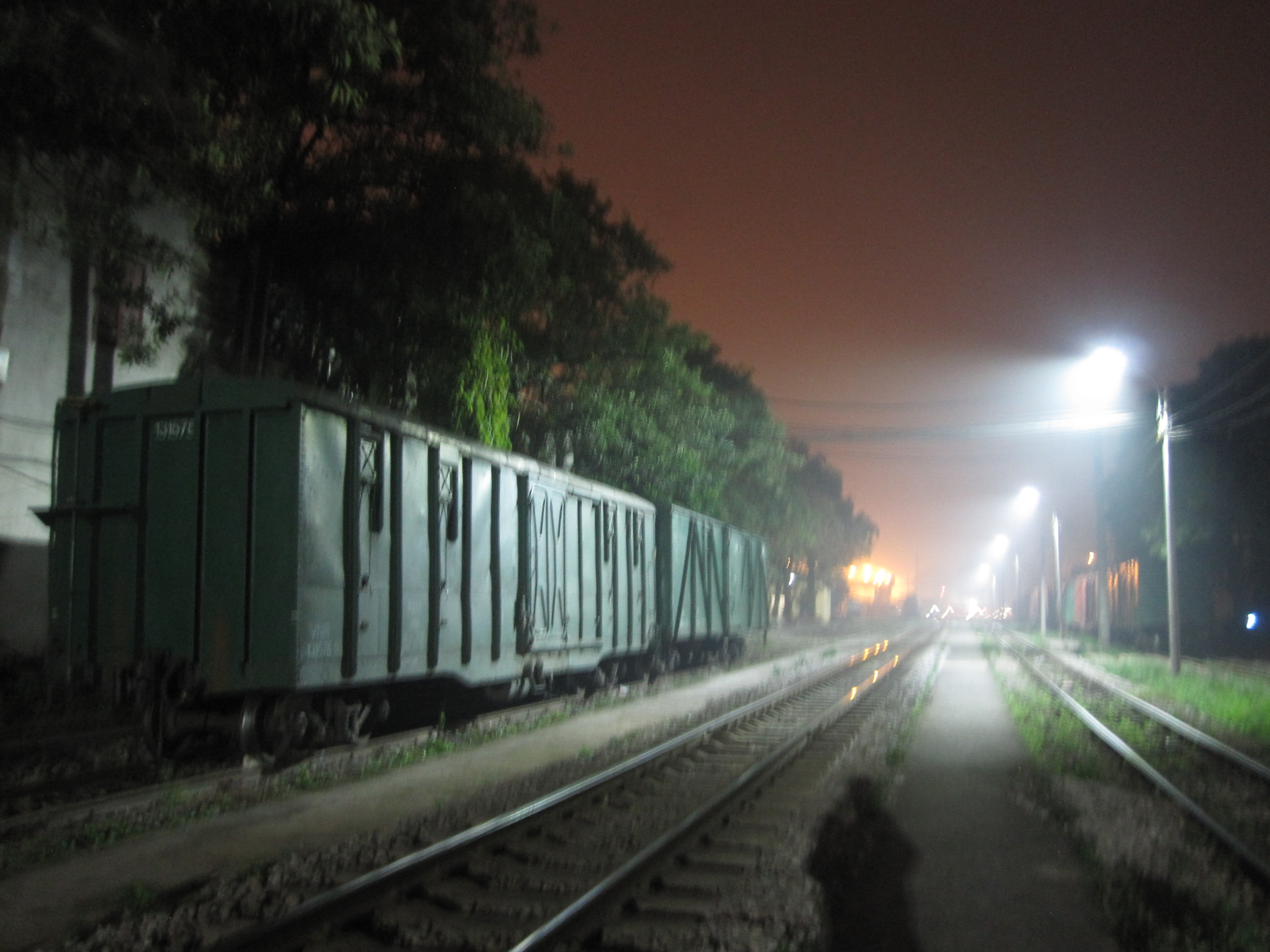

General information
- Location: Vietnam
- Coordinates: 20°56′39″N 105°50′39″E
Location

Văn Điển station is a railway station on the North–South railway (Reunification Express) in Vietnam. It serves the town of Văn Điển, a suburb of Hanoi.
