= Chợ Sy station =

Railway station in Vietnam

Chợ Sy station is a railway station on North–South railway at Km 279 in Vietnam. It's located in Diễn Châu, Nghệ An between Yên Lý station and Mỹ Lý station.
