= Liên Chiểu =

- Ward
- Liên Chiểu Ward People's Committee office

- Location in Vietnam
- Coordinates: 16.076574340168573°N 108.1459353213274°E
- Country: Vietnam
- Region: South Central Coast and Central Highlands
- Municipality: Da Nang
- Administrative headquarters: 68 Lạc Long Quân Street

Area
  - Total: 41.19 km^{2} (15.90 sq mi)

Population (2025)
  - Total: 70,628
  - Density: 1,714/km^{2} (4,440/sq mi)
- Website: lienchieu.danang.gov.vn

Liên Chiểu is a ward in the municipality of Da Nang, Vietnam.

On 16 June 2025:

- District-level administrative units nationwide were dissolved.
- The entire area and population of Hòa Khánh Bắc ward, formerly part of Liên Chiểu district, and the remaining area of Hòa Liên commune, formerly part of Hòa Vang district, were merged to form a new ward named Liên Chiểu.
