= Tuyên Phú =

Coordinates: 17.8589°N 106.1100°E

- Commune and village
- Interactive map of Tuyên Phú
- Country: Vietnam
- Province: Quảng Trị

Area
  - Total: 5,999 sq mi (15,538 km^{2})

Population (2024)
  - Total: 18,800
  - Density: 3.13/sq mi (1.21/km^{2})
- Time zone: UTC+07:00

Tuyên Phú is a commune (xã) and village in Quảng Trị Province, in Vietnam.

On June 16, 2025, the Standing Committee of the National Assembly issued Resolution No. 1680/NQ-UBTVQH15 on the reorganization of commune-level administrative units in Quảng Trị Province in 2025. Accordingly, Đồng Hóa Commune, Thạch Hóa Commune, and Đức Hóa Commune were merged to form a new commune named Tuyên Phú Commune.
