= Tuyên Bình =

Coordinates: 17.8422°N 106.1675°E

- Commune and village
- Interactive map of Tuyên Bình
- Country: Vietnam
- Province: Quảng Trị
- Time zone: UTC+07:00

Tuyên Bình is a commune (xã) and village in Quảng Trị Province, in Vietnam.

On June 16, 2025, the Standing Committee of the National Assembly issued Resolution No. 1680/NQ-UBTVQH15 on the reorganization of commune-level administrative units in Quảng Trị Province in 2025 (the resolution took effect on July 1, 2025). Accordingly, the entire natural area and population of Phong Hóa, Ngư Hóa, and Mai Hóa communes were merged to form a new commune named Tuyên Bình.
