= Núi Gôi station =

Railway station in Vietnam

Núi Gôi station is a railway station on North–South railway at Km 101 in Vietnam. The station is located in Vụ Bản, Nam Định between Trình Xuyên station and Cát Đằng station.
