= Đồng Lê =

- Commune
- Interactive map of Đồng Lê
- Coordinates: 17°53′07″N 106°01′24″E
- Country: Vietnam
- Province: Quảng Trị
- Established: 1999

Area
  - Total: 4.14 sq mi (10.72 km^{2})

Population (2009)
  - Total: 5,426
  - Density: 1,363/sq mi (526.4/km^{2})
- Time zone: UTC+7 (UTC+7)

Đồng Lê is a commune (xã) in the Quảng Trị province, Bắc Trung Bộ, Vietnam.

On June 16, 2025, the Standing Committee of the National Assembly issued Resolution No. 1680/NQ-UBTVQH15 on the reorganization of commune-level administrative units in Quảng Trị Province in 2025. Accordingly, the entire natural area and population of Đồng Lê Township, Kim Hóa Commune, Lê Hóa Commune, Thuận Hóa Commune, and Sơn Hóa Commune were reorganized to form a new commune named Đồng Lê Commune.
