= Quán Hành station =

Railway station in Vietnam

Coordinates: 18°46′56″N 105°38′49″E

Quán Hành station is a railway station on North–South railway at Km 309 in Vietnam. It is located in Nghi Lộc, Nghệ An between Mỹ Lý station and Vinh station.
