= Đồng Xuân =

- Commune
- Interactive map of Đồng Xuân
- Coordinates: 13.378411723482872°N 109.10472438864339°E
- Country: Vietnam
- Region: South Central Coast and Central Highlands
- Province: Đắk Lắk
- Established: 2025
- Administrative headquarters: 68 Trần Phú Street, Long Châu Residential Group

Area
  - Total: 206.26 km^{2} (79.64 sq mi)

Population (2025)
  - Total: 26,907
  - Density: 130/km^{2} (340/sq mi)
- Website: dongxuan.daklak.gov.vn

Đồng Xuân is a commune in Đắk Lắk province, Vietnam.

On 16 June 2025:

- District-level administrative units throughout Vietnam ceased operations from 1 July 2025.
- The entire area and population of La Hai township and Xuân Sơn Nam, Xuân Sơn Bắc, Xuân Long, and Xuân Quang 2 communes, formerly part of Đồng Xuân district, Phú Yên province, were merged to form a new commune named Đồng Xuân.
