= Cát Đằng station =

Railway station in Vietnam

Coordinates: 20.295°N 106.025°E

Cát Đằng station is a railway station on North–South railway at Km 108 in Vietnam. It's located in Ý Yên, Nam Định between Núi Gôi station and Ninh Bình station.
