= Tánh Linh district =

Coordinates: 11.167°N 107.667°E

Tanh Linh District Huyện Tánh Linh
- District
- Seal
- Interactive map of Tanh Linh District
- Country: Vietnam
- Region: Southeast
- Province: Bình Thuận
- Capital: Lạc Tánh

Area
  - Total: 453 sq mi (1,174 km^{2})

Population (2003)
  - Total: 99,679
  - Density: 220/sq mi (84.9/km^{2})
- Time zone: UTC+07:00 (Indochina Time)

Tánh Linh is a former rural district of Bình Thuận province in the Southeast region of Vietnam. As of 2003, the district had a population of 99,679. The district covers an area of 1,174 km^{2} (453 sq mi). The district capital lies at Lạc Tánh.

== Climate ==
Tánh Linh has a tropical savanna climate.

Tánh Linh is located at the buffer zone between the heavy rain center of the South (Di Linh Plateau) and the coastal plains, characterised by the transition between the rains of the South Central Coast and the southern delta. The climate can be split into two distinct seasons: the rainy season and the dry season.

The rainy season runs between May and November. Many plants grow and thrive during this season. In contrast, during the dry season, which runs between December and April, they do not grow as well, and pests have a great impact on crop yields.

In the south, the average annual rainfall ranges from 1,500-1,900mm, and in the north it is around 2,175mm, although sometimes it can reach or exceed 2,894mm.

Climate data for Tánh Linh
| Month | Jan | Feb | Mar | Apr | May | Jun | Jul | Aug | Sep | Oct | Nov | Dec | Year |
|---|---|---|---|---|---|---|---|---|---|---|---|---|---|
| Average rainfall mm (inches) | 21 (0.8) | 5 (0.2) | 12 (0.5) | 90 (3.5) | 200 (7.9) | 315 (12.4) | 336 (13.2) | 308 (12.1) | 380 (15.0) | 300 (11.8) | 148 (5.8) | 60 (2.4) | 2,175 (85.6) |
| Average rainy days | 2 | 0 | 0 | 5 | 13 | 18 | 20 | 18 | 21 | 18 | 13 | 5 | 133 |
