= Tuyên Hóa =

- Commune and village
- Interactive map of Tuyên Hóa
- Coordinates: 17°47′27″N 106°13′22″E
- Country: Vietnam
- Province: Quảng Trị

Area
  - Total: 75.26 sq mi (194.92 km^{2})

Population (2024)
  - Total: 21,452
  - Density: 285.04/sq mi (110.06/km^{2})
- Time zone: UTC+07:00

Tuyên Hóa is a commune (xã) and village in Quảng Trị Province, in Vietnam. It is one of the 78 new wards, communes and special zones of the province following the reorganization in 2025.

On June 16, 2025, the Standing Committee of the National Assembly issued Resolution No. 1680/NQ-UBTVQH15 on the reorganization of commune-level administrative units in Quảng Trị Province in 2025. Accordingly, Tiến Hóa Commune, Châu Hóa Commune, Cao Quảng Commune, and Văn Hóa Commune were merged to form a new commune named Tuyên Hóa Commune.
