= Mỹ Lộc district =

Coordinates: 20.467°N 106.183°E

Mỹ Lộc district Huyện Mỹ Lộc
- Former District
- Interactive map of Mỹ Lộc district
- Country: Vietnam
- Region: Red River Delta
- Province: Nam Định
- 1st merge into Nam Định: 1967
- District re-established: 1997
- 2nd merge into Nam Định: 2024
- District capital: Mỹ Lộc town
- Subdivisions: List: 1 town; 10 communes

Mỹ Lộc is a former district of Nam Định province in the Red River Delta region of Vietnam. On 1 September 2024, it was merged into Nam Định city.
