= Hương Khê district =

Coordinates: 18.176°N 105.711°E

Hương Khê District Huyện Hương Khê
- District
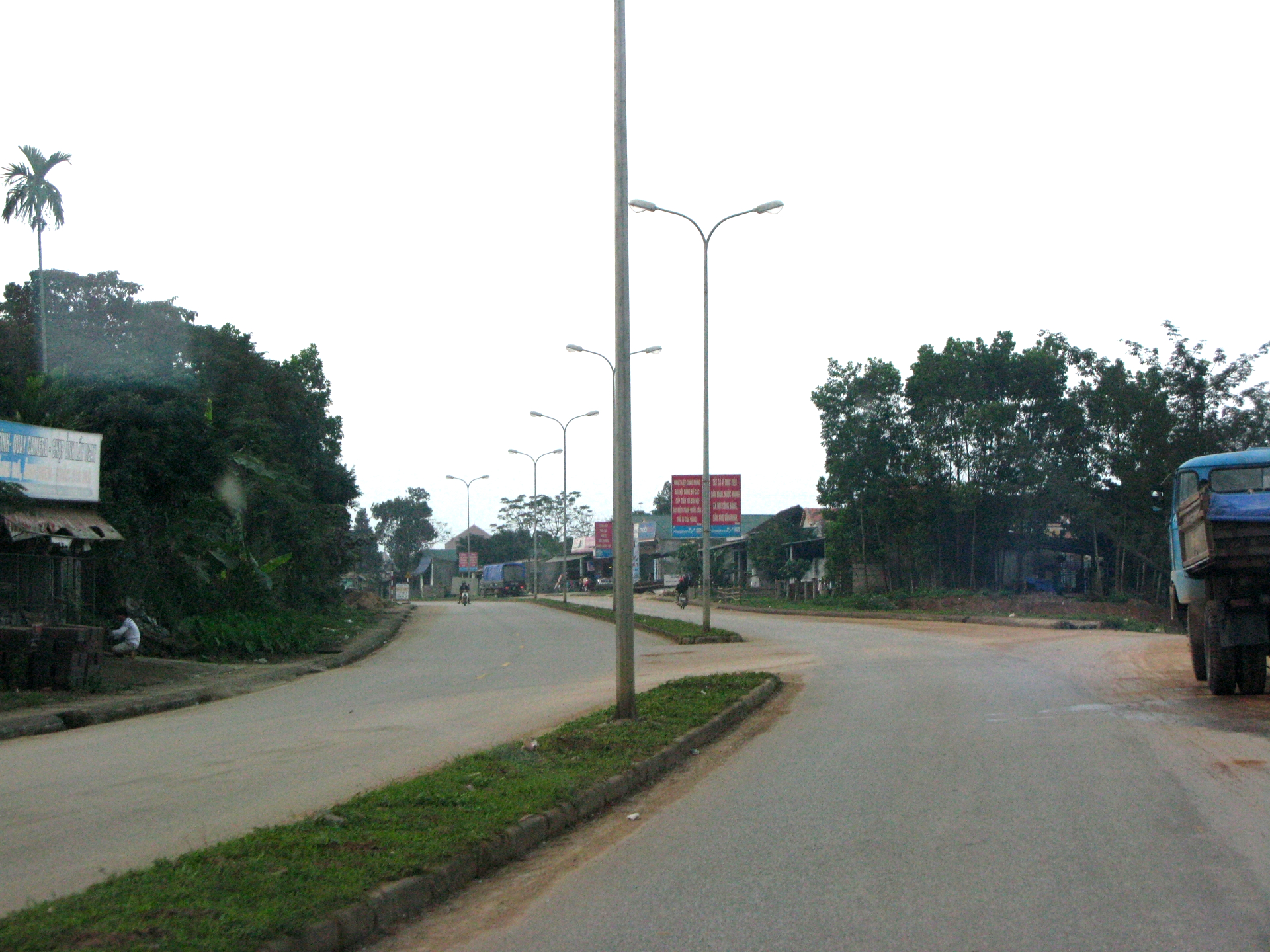
- Interactive map of Hương Khê District
- Country: Vietnam
- Region: North Central Coast
- Province: Hà Tĩnh
- Capital: Hương Khê

Area
  - Total: 502 sq mi (1,299 km^{2})

Population (2003)
  - Total: 105,975
- Time zone: UTC+07:00 (Indochina Time)

Hương Khê is a rural district (huyện) of Hà Tĩnh province in the North Central Coast region of Vietnam.

As of 2003 the district had a population of 105,975. The district covers an area of 1,299 square kilometres (502 sq mi). The district capital lies at Hương Khê. On 20 April 2019 it recorded a temperature of 43.4 °C (110.1 °F), which is the highest temperature ever recorded in Vietnam until 7 May 2023.

== Climate ==
Climate data for Hương Khê
Month	Jan	Feb	Mar	Apr	May	Jun	Jul	Aug	Sep	Oct	Nov	Dec	Year
Record high °C (°F)	35.4 (95.7)	38.4 (101.1)	41.0 (105.8)	43.4 (110.1)	42.6 (108.7)	42.1 (107.8)	41.0 (105.8)	40.5 (104.9)	39.3 (102.7)	36.0 (96.8)	36.8 (98.2)	33.4 (92.1)	43.4 (110.1)
Mean daily maximum °C (°F)	21.4 (70.5)	22.5 (72.5)	25.7 (78.3)	30.5 (86.9)	33.6 (92.5)	34.6 (94.3)	34.8 (94.6)	33.4 (92.1)	31.2 (88.2)	28.1 (82.6)	25.1 (77.2)	22.1 (71.8)	28.6 (83.5)
Daily mean °C (°F)	17.6 (63.7)	18.7 (65.7)	21.3 (70.3)	25.1 (77.2)	27.8 (82.0)	29.2 (84.6)	29.2 (84.6)	28.1 (82.6)	26.3 (79.3)	24.0 (75.2)	21.3 (70.3)	18.5 (65.3)	23.9 (75.0)
Mean daily minimum °C (°F)	15.4 (59.7)	16.6 (61.9)	19.0 (66.2)	21.9 (71.4)	24.1 (75.4)	25.3 (77.5)	25.3 (77.5)	24.8 (76.6)	23.6 (74.5)	21.6 (70.9)	19.0 (66.2)	16.2 (61.2)	21.0 (69.8)
Record low °C (°F)	2.6 (36.7)	6.7 (44.1)	6.1 (43.0)	11.8 (53.2)	15.5 (59.9)	19.0 (66.2)	20.4 (68.7)	20.4 (68.7)	17.2 (63.0)	13.5 (56.3)	6.6 (43.9)	2.9 (37.2)	2.6 (36.7)
Average precipitation mm (inches)	43.6 (1.72)	46.8 (1.84)	66.0 (2.60)	94.8 (3.73)	206.8 (8.14)	157.0 (6.18)	160.5 (6.32)	282.6 (11.13)	504.1 (19.85)	578.8 (22.79)	201.7 (7.94)	71.7 (2.82)	2,414.1 (95.04)
Average rainy days	13.8	14.7	16.4	13.1	14.4	11.5	11.6	15.6	17.1	19.0	14.5	12.3	173.9
Average relative humidity (%)	89.7	90.1	89.1	85.7	80.6	76.7	75.2	81.4	86.0	88.4	88.1	88.3	84.9
Mean monthly sunshine hours	58.3	51.8	72.9	125.8	176.6	181.2	191.3	154.7	118.8	93.0	70.2	51.4	1,332.7
Source: Vietnam Institute for Building Science and Technology
