= Lệ Thủy =

Coordinates: 17°13′30″N 106°47′30″E

Lệ Thủy Xã Lệ Thủy
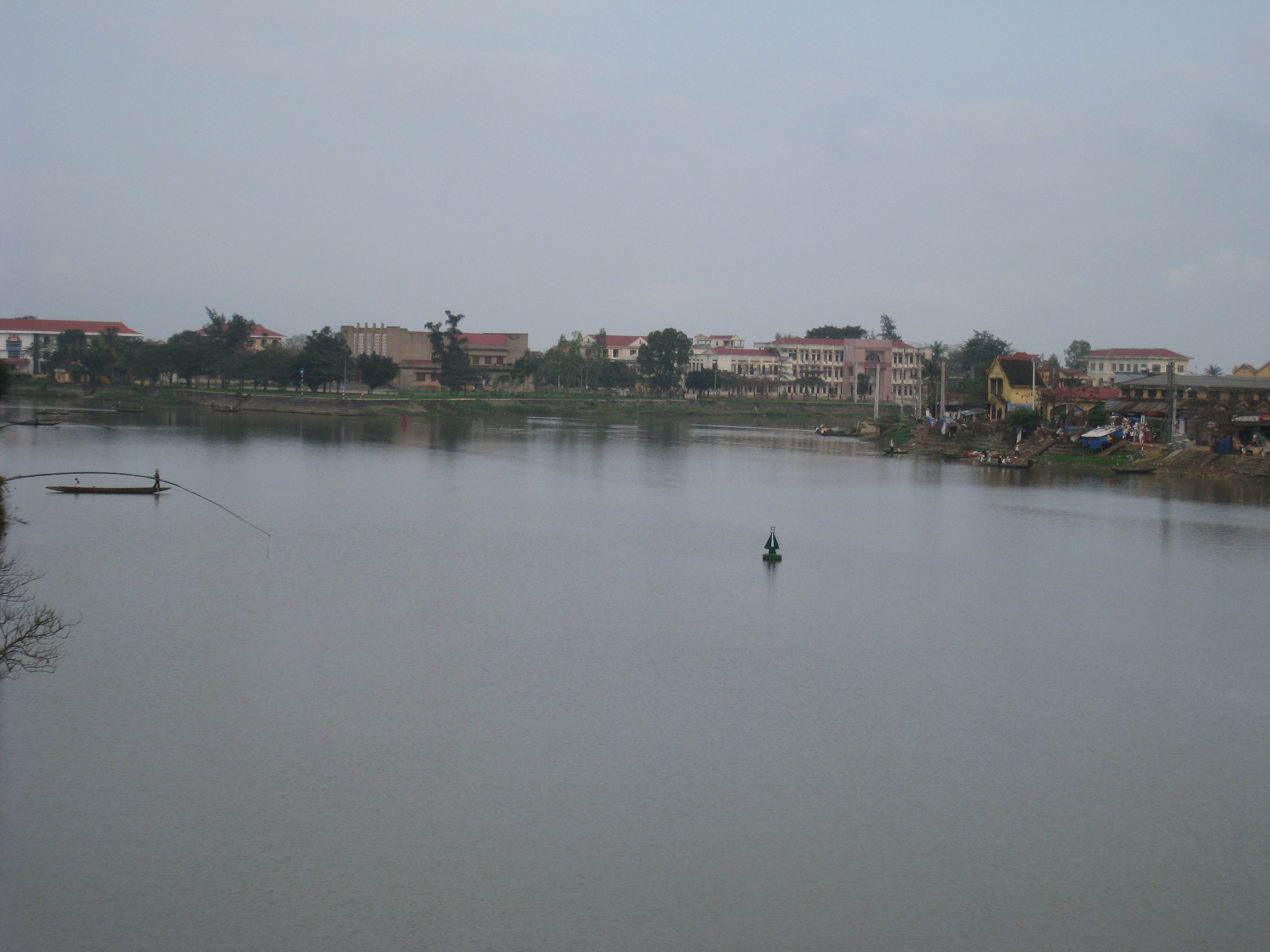
- Interactive map of Lệ Thủy
- Country: Vietnam
- Province: Quảng Trị

Area
  - Total: 3.1385 km^{2} (1.2118 sq mi)

Population (Aug. 2016)
  - Total: 10,558
  - Density: 3,364.0/km^{2} (8,712.8/sq mi)
- Time zone: UTC+07:00 (Vietnam Standard Time)

Lệ Thủy is a commune in Quảng Trị Province, in the North Central Coast region of Vietnam. This commune is located on the banks of the Kiến Giang River. The commune is the capital of the district. The commune's main economic activities is commerce and services for the surrounding rural areas. This commune is 3 km south of families of Võ Nguyên Giáp, Ngo Dinh Diem and Nguyễn Hữu Cảnh, Dương Văn An, famous persons in the history of Vietnam. The commune has an area of 4.4km2, population of 6,246. The commune is prone to flooding due to its position in a low plain created by Kiến Giang river.

It is one of the 78 new wards, communes and special zones of the province following the reorganization in 2025. On June 16, 2025, the Standing Committee of the National Assembly issued Resolution No. 1680/NQ-UBTVQH15 on the reorganization of commune-level administrative units in Quảng Trị Province in 2025. Accordingly, Kiến Giang Township, together with Liên Thủy Commune, Xuân Thủy Commune, An Thủy Commune, Phong Thủy Commune, and Lộc Thủy Commune, were merged to form a new commune named Lệ Thủy Commune.
