= Nam Định station =

Railway station in Vietnam

Nam Định
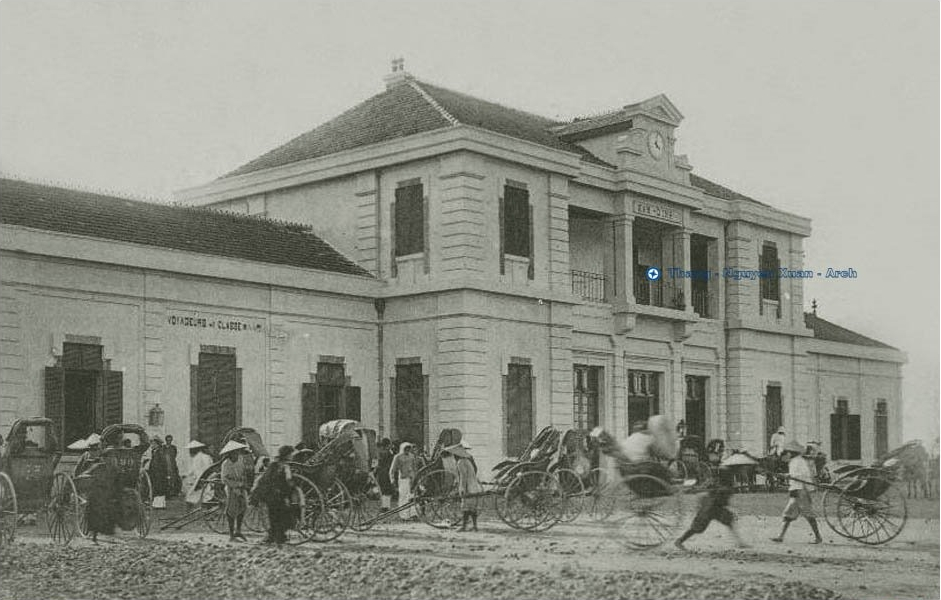
- Photo of Nam Dinh Station building under the French colonial period.

General information
- Location: Vietnam
- Coordinates: 20°25′12″N 106°09′52″E
Location

Nam Định station is one of the main railway stations on the North–South railway (Reunification Express) in Vietnam. It serves the city of Nam Định.
