= Ninh Hòa =

- Ward
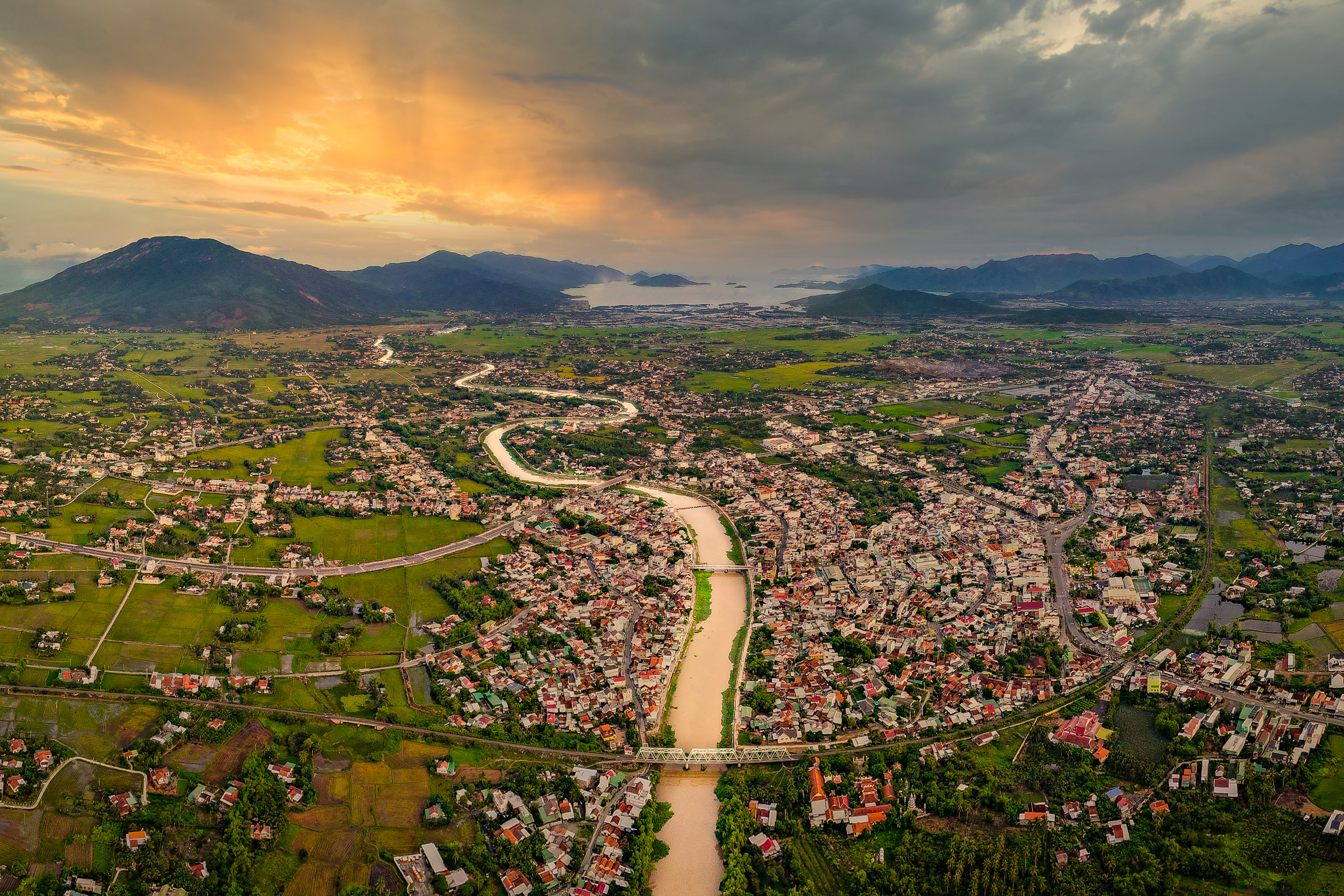
- Sunrise on the banks of the Dinh River
- Interactive map of Ninh Hòa
- Coordinates: 12.49204693501356°N 109.12561279057057°E
- Country: Vietnam
- Region: South Central Coast and Central Highlands
- Province: Khánh Hòa
- Established: 16 June 2025
- Administrative headquarters: 999 Trần Quý Cáp Street

Area
  - Total: 35.80 km^{2} (13.82 sq mi)

Population (2025)
  - Total: 58,816
- Website: ninhhoa.khanhhoa.gov.vn

Ninh Hòa is a ward in Khánh Hòa province, Vietnam.

On 16 June 2025, the Standing Committee of the National Assembly of Vietnam issued Resolution No. 1667/NQ-UBTVQH15 on the arrangement of commune-level administrative units in Khánh Hòa province in 2025. Under the resolution, the entire area and population of Ninh Hiệp and Ninh Đa wards and Ninh Đông and Ninh Phụng communes were merged to form a new ward named Ninh Hòa.
