= Phú Xuyên district =

Phú Xuyên district Huyện Phú Xuyên
- District
- Location within Hanoi
- Coordinates: 20.742403°N 105.912399°E
- Country: Vietnam
- Region: Red River Delta
- Municipality: Hanoi
- Capital: Phú Xuyên
- Time zone: UTC+7 (Indochina Time)

Phú Xuyên is a former district (huyện) of Hanoi in the Red River Delta region of Vietnam.

Phú Xuyên district is bordered by Hưng Yên province to the east, Ứng Hòa district to the west, Hà Nam province to the south, Thường Tín district to the north and Thanh Oai district to the northwest.

The district is subdivided to 27 commune-level subdivisions, including the townships of Phú Xuyên (district capital), Phú Minh and the rural communes of Bạch Hạ, Châu Can, Chuyên Mỹ, Đại Thắng, Đại Xuyên, Hoàng Long, Hồng Minh, Hồng Thái, Khai Thái, Minh Tân, Nam Phong, Nam Tiến, Nam Triều, Phú Túc, Phú Yên, Phúc Tiến, Phượng Dực, Quang Lãng, Quang Trung, Sơn Hà, Tân Dân, Tri Thủy, Tri Trung, Văn Hoàng, Vân Từ.
