= Thường Tín district =

Thường Tín district Huyện Thường Tín
- District
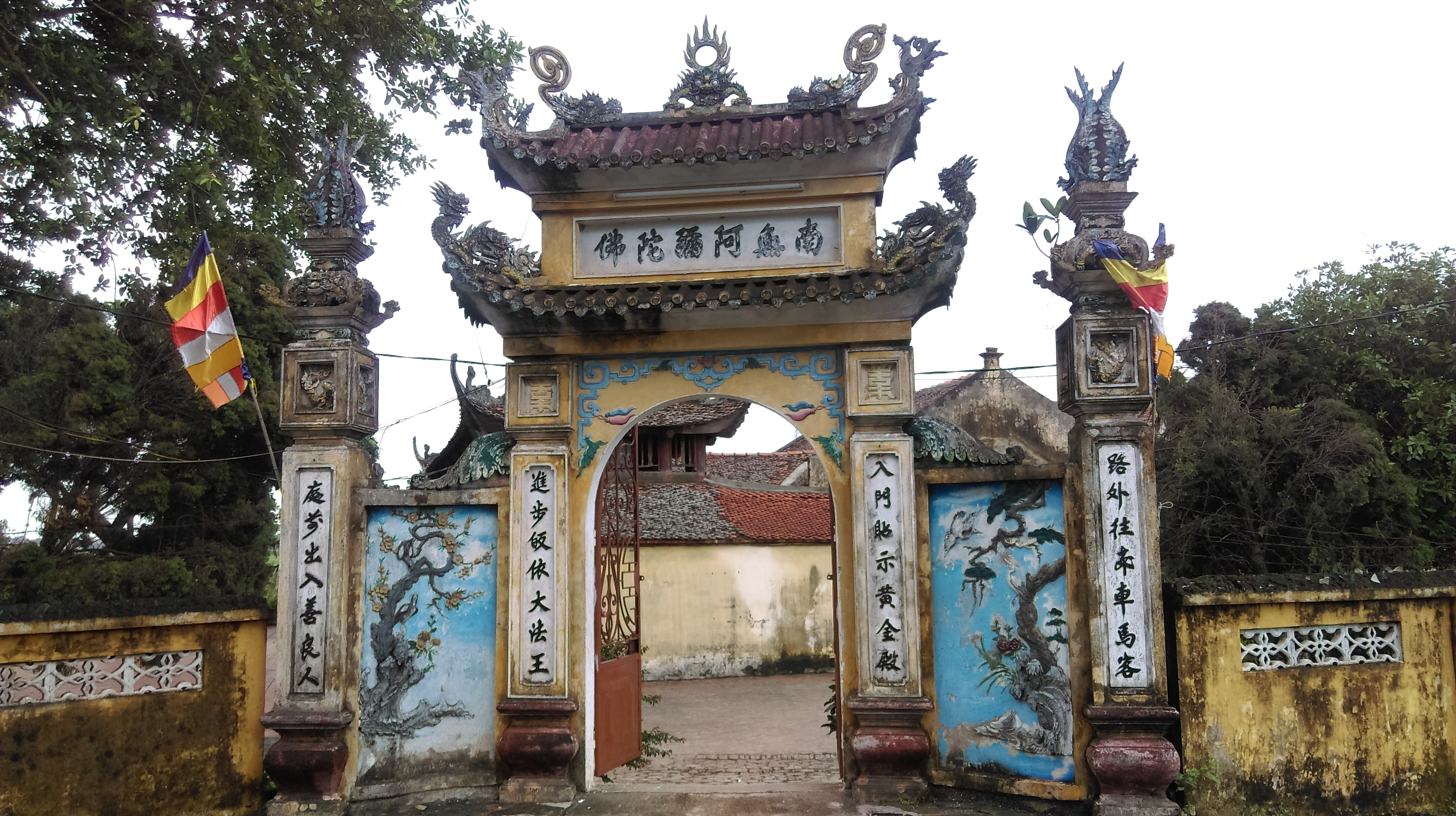
- Phap Van Pagoda, located in Thuong Tin

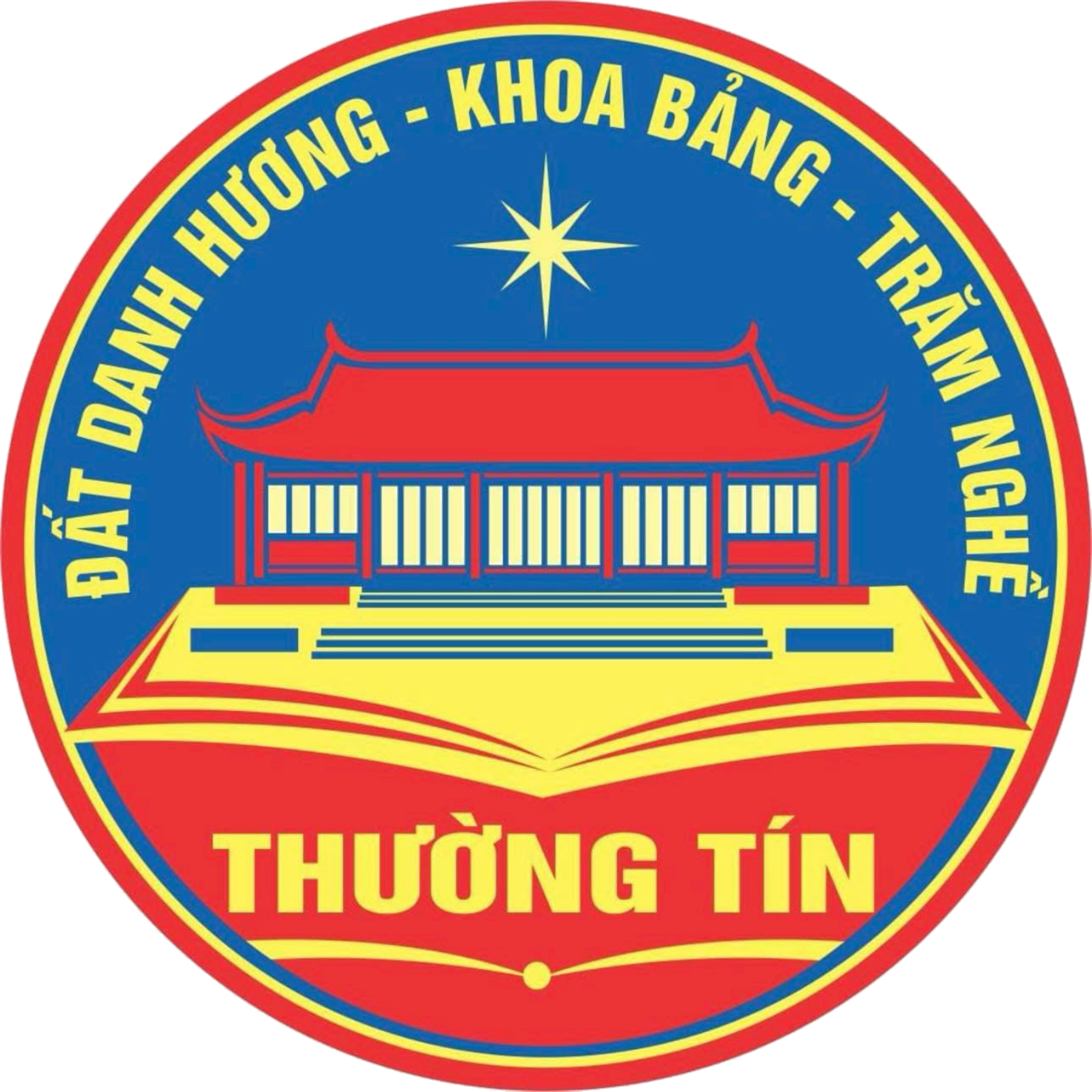
- Seal

- Location within Hanoi
- Coordinates: 20.871470°N 105.864399°E
- Country: Vietnam
- Region: Red River Delta
- Municipality: Hanoi
- Capital: Thường Tín

Area
  - Total: 4,926 sq mi (12,759 km^{2})

Population
  - Total: 230,000
  - Density: 4,340/sq mi (1,677/km^{2})
- Time zone: UTC+7 (Indochina Time)

Thường Tín is a district (huyện) of Hanoi in the Red River Delta region of Vietnam.

Thường Tín district is bordered by Hưng Yên province to the east, Thanh Oai district to the west, Phú Xuyên district to the south and Thanh Trì district to the north.

The district is subdivided to 29 commune-level subdivisions, including the township of Thường Tín (district capital) and the rural communes Chương Dương, Dũng Tiến, Duyên Thái, Hà Hồi, Hiền Giang, Hòa Bình, Khánh Hà, Hồng Vân, Lê Lợi, Liên Phương, Minh Cường, Nghiêm Xuyên, Nguyễn Trãi, Nhị Khê, Ninh Sở, Quất Động, Tân Minh, Thắng Lợi, Thống Nhất, Thư Phú, Tiền Phong, Tô Hiệu, Tự Nhiên, Vạn Điểm, Văn Bình, Văn Phú, Văn Tự, Vân Tảo.
