= Nghệ Tĩnh province =

Historic province of Vietnam

Nghe Tinh province on the administrative map of Vietnam in 1976

Nghệ Tĩnh was a province of Vietnam from 1976 to 1991, then from 1991 divided into Nghệ An and Hà Tĩnh.

== Geography ==
Nghe Tinh province has geographical location:

- The North borders on the province Thanh Hoa
- The South borders on the province Binh Tri Thien
- The East borders Gulf of Tonkin
- The West borders Laos.

== Area and population ==
- Area (1991): 22,502 km ^{2}
- Population (1991): 3,311,532 people

== History ==
In the Đinh period, the Tien Le house was called Hoan Chau.

Period Ly dynasty, 1030, began to call the Chau Nghe An.

- Period house of Hau Le, from 1490 called the land of Nghe An.

Period Tay Son, called Nghia An Town.

During the Nguyen period, Gia Long was again placed as Nghe An town.

In 1831, King Minh Mang divided Nghe An into two provinces: Nghe An (north of Lam river); Ha Tinh (south of Lam River).

From 1976 to 1991, the merger of Nghe An and Ha Tinh into Nghe Tinh province, the administrative units include: Vinh city, Ha Tinh town and 25 districts: Anh Sơn, Cam Xuyen, Can Loc, Con Cuong, Dien Chau, Do Luong, Duc Tho, Hung Nguyen, Huong Khe, Hương Sơn, Ky Anh, Ky Son, Nam Dan, Nghi Loc, Nghi Xuan, Nghia Dan, Que Phong, Quy Chau, Quy Hop, Quynh Luu, Tan Ky, Thach Ha, Thanh Chuong, Tuong Duong, Yen Thanh.

On August 12, 1991, the ninth session of the VIIIth National Assembly issued a resolution to divide Nghe Tinh province to re-establish Nghe An and Ha Tinh provinces:

- The province Ha Tinh includes Ha Tinh town and 8 districts: Cam Xuyen, Can Loc, Duc Tho, Huong Khe, Hương Sơn, Ky Anh, Nghi Xuan, Thach Ha.
- Provinces Nghe An include Vinh city and 17 districts: Anh Sơn, Con Cuong, Dien Chau, Do Luong, Hung Nguyen, Ky Son, Nam Dan, Nghi Loc, Nghia Dan, Que Phong, Quy Chau, Quy Hop, Quynh Luu, Tan Ky, Thanh Chuong, Tuong Duong, Yen Thanh.
