= Western Nghệ An Biosphere Reserve =

Protected area in Vietnam

Coordinates: 19.2400°N 104.9200°E

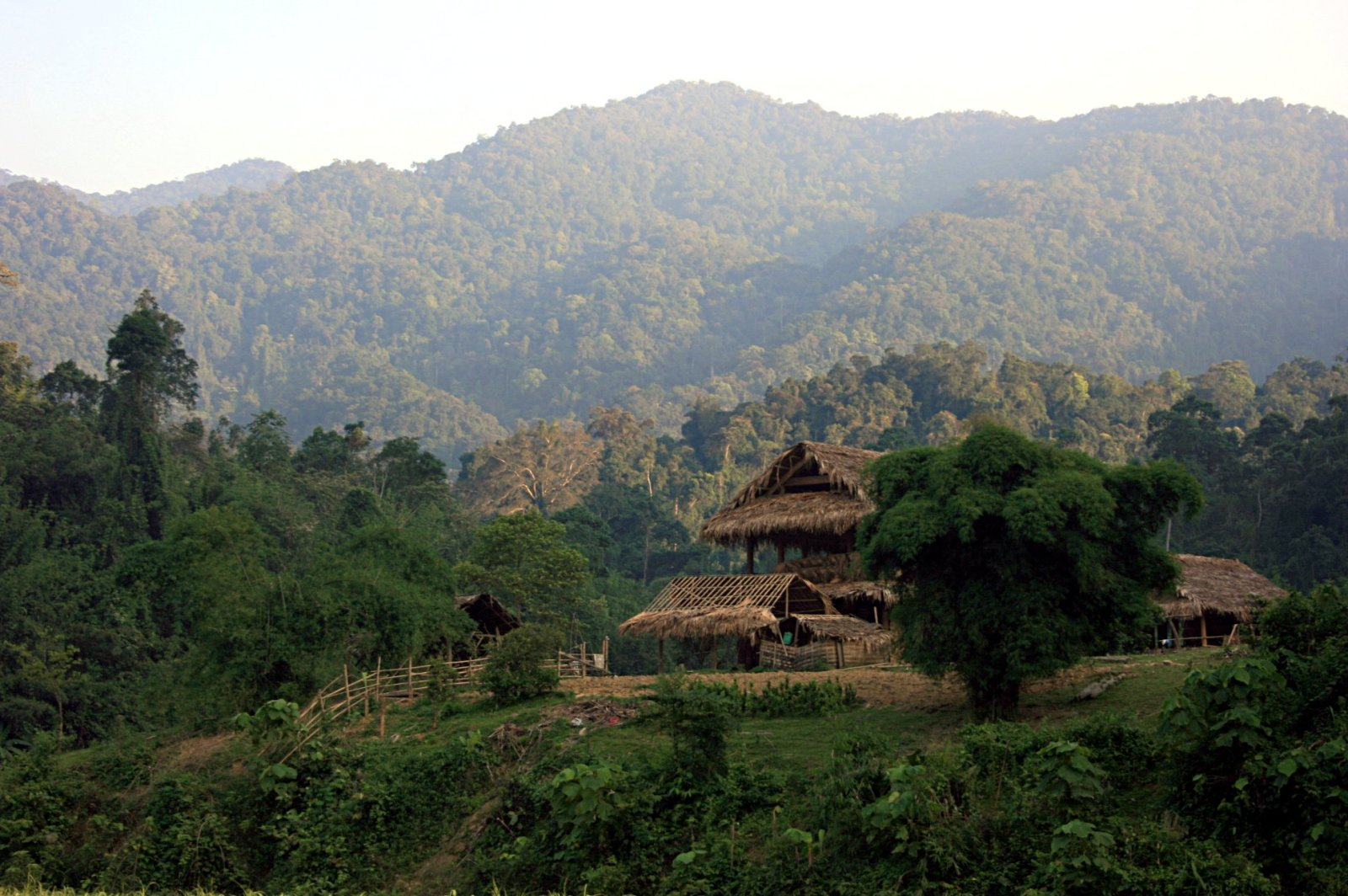
Pu Mat National Park

Western Nghe An is a UNESCO biosphere reserve. It is located in Nghệ An Province in the tropical and temperate zone of Vietnam, and on the border with Laos. It was designated as a biosphere reserve in 2007, and recognised by UNESCO in 2011. It is one of eight recognised biospheres in Vietnam.

== Description ==
The Western Nghe An biosphere reserve is an area profoundly influenced by a northeast and southwest monsoon. The topography of the Annamite Range influences circulation of the atmosphere, which creates large climatic differences in this region.

The Biosphere Reserve has area of about 1,303,285 ha, being the largest biosphere reserve in South-East Asia. Covering nine mountainous districts including Con Cuông, Anh Sơn, Tương Dương, Quế Phong, Quỳ Châu, Quỳ Hợp, Thanh Chương and Tân Kỳ, its core consists of three nationally protected areas: the Pù Mát National Park, the Pu Huong Nature Reserve, and the Pu Hoat Nature Reserve.

== Human population ==
Most of population in the biosphere reserve is of Thai ethnic group (68.89%) and a small number of O Du ethnic groups (0.6%). Living in 3 districts in Pù Mát National Park region belongs to 3 main ethnic groups: Thai, Kho Mu, Kinh and other ethnic groups such as: Tay, H' Mong, O Du. The population suffers the highest rate of poverty in the country.

== History ==
The design of the Biosphere Reserve is based on criteria to perform three functions of internationally Proposed Biosphere Reserves: the development strategy of the country, the commitment of Nghe An provincial People's Committee in implementing the Convention of Biological Diversity (CBD), and the Agenda 21 national project. The Biosphere Reserve has a 440.8 km friendship border with Laos People's Democratic Republic.

== Biodiversity ==
=== Flora and fauna ===
There are at present 130 species of mammals, 295 bird species, 54 species of amphibians and reptiles, 84 species of fish and 39 species of bats.

== Location ==
=== Coordinates ===
- Longitude: 103.874345 - 105.500152
- Latitude: 18.579179 - 19.727594

=== Area (hectares) ===
- Total 1,303,285
- Core area(s) 191,922
- Buffer zone(s) 503,270
- Transition area(s) when given 608,093
- Altitude (metres above sea level) 57.8m -1,800m
- Year designated 2007
- Administrative authorities People's Committees of Nghe An province

== Other Biosphere Reserves in Vietnam ==
- Cần Giờ Mangrove Forest
- Cát Tiên National Park
- Cát Bà Island
- Red River Delta
- Kien Giang
- Cape Cà Mau National Park
- Cu Lao Cham Marine Park
