= Pù Mát National Park =

National park in Vietnam

- IUCN category II (national park)
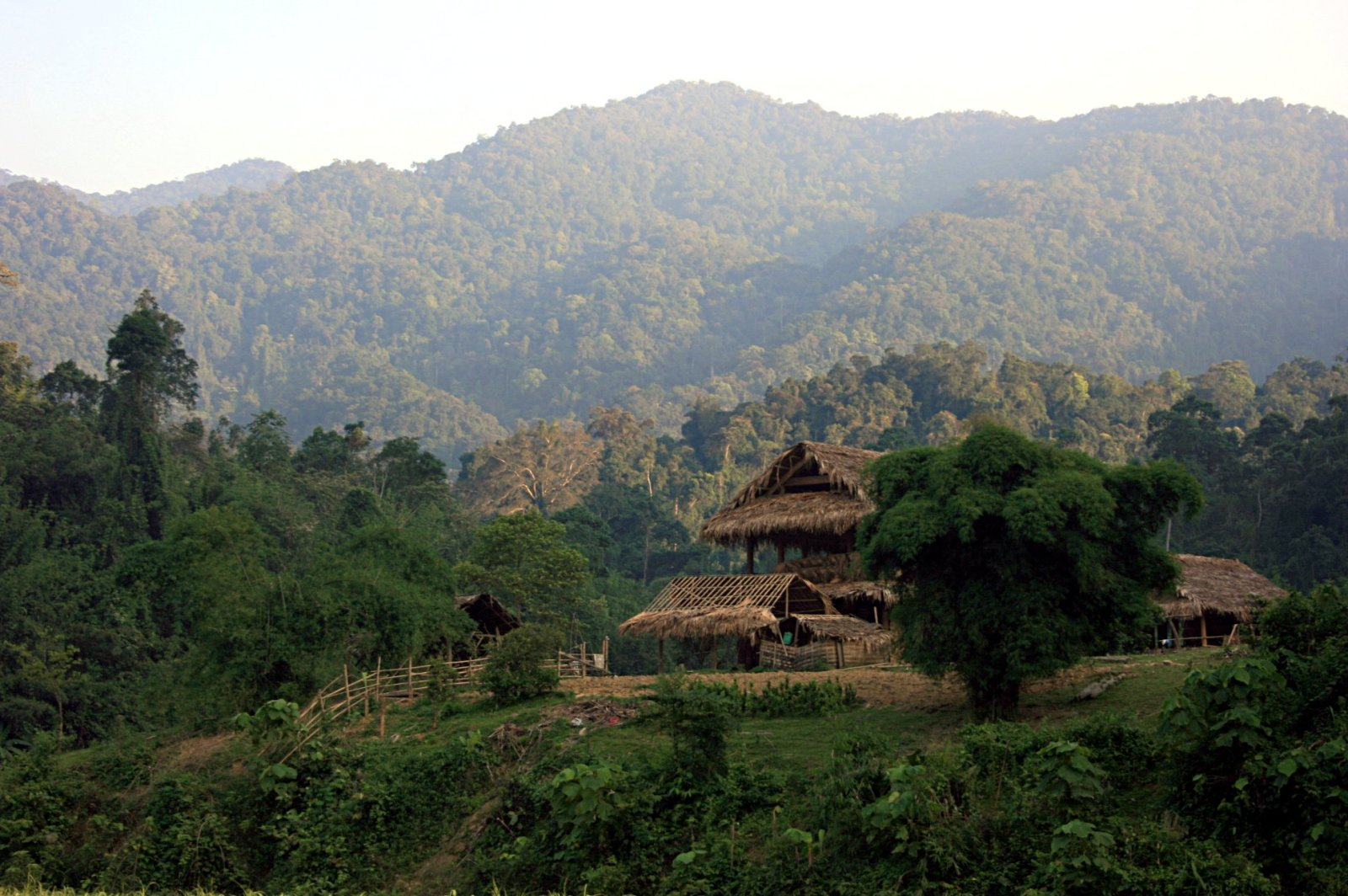
- Pù Mát National Park

- Location within Vietnam
- Location: North Central Coast
- Nearest city: Hanoi
- Coordinates: 18°59′00″N 104°40′00″E
- Area: 911.13 km^{2} (351.79 sq mi)
- Established: 2001
- Governing body: People's Committee of Nghệ An Province

Pù Mát National Park (Vietnamese: Vườn quốc gia Pù Mát) is a national park in Nghệ An Province, in Vietnam's North Central Coast region. It is part of the Western Nghệ An Biosphere Reserve.

In the Thai language, Pù Mát means "high slope". This park was established by Decision 174/2001/QĐ-TTg, dated November 8, 2001, by the Prime Minister of Vietnam on upgrading Pù Mát Preservation Zone.

This park is situated from N 18°46′to 19°12′and from E 104°24′to 104°56′. The park covers an area of 94,804 ha, spreading in three areas of Tương Dương, Con Cuông and Anh Sơn of Nghệ An Province. Of the total area, the strictly protected area comprises 89.517 ha, and the ecological recovery area comprises 1.596 ha. A buffer area covers 86.000 ha.

== Biodiversity values ==
2,461 plant species have been confirmed to occur at Pù Mát, some of which may be new to science; taxonomic work is currently underway to confirm this. The most widespread vegetation type in the national park is lowland evergreen forest.

Pù Mát is probably one of the most important sites for mammal conservation in Vietnam. The Social Forestry and Nature Conservation in Nghe An Province (SFNC) surveys and research have confirmed the presence of five mammals endemic to Indochina: northern white-cheeked gibbon, red-shanked douc, saola, Truong Son muntjac and Annamite striped rabbit. The SFNC studies also confirmed the continued occurrence a number of other globally threatened mammals at Pu Mat, including Assam macaque, Ussuri dhole, Indochinese tiger and Indian elephant.

A "substantial" population of 455 critically endangered northern white-cheeked crested gibbons (Nomascus leucogenys) have been recently found living in the Pù Mát National Park in Nghệ An Province, northern Vietnam, near the border with Laos. Conservation International report they are living at high altitudes, and far from human settlements. This population, representing two thirds of the total known in Vietnam are, apparently, the "only confirmed viable population" of this variety in the world.
