= National Route 7 (Vietnam) =

Road in Vietnam

National Route 7
- Quốc lộ 7

Route information
- Length: 225 km (140 mi)

Major junctions
- Northwest end: QL 1 in Diễn Châu
- // in Đô Lương: TL 534; TL 538; TL 27D in Anh Sơn; TL 496; in Xá Lượng
- Southeast end: NR. 7 at Nậm Cắn Pass, Laotian border

Location
- Country: Vietnam

Highway system
- Transport in Vietnam
← QL 6B	→ QL 7B

National Route 7 (Vietnamese: quốc lộ 7), formerly called National Route 7A (QL7A) is an east-west national highway in Vietnam which runs entirely in Nghệ An Province, North Central Vietnam. The 225 kilometer-long route runs from Diễn Châu (Diễn Châu District) northwestward across Yên Thành, Đô Lương, Anh Sơn, Con Cuông, Tương Dương, and Kỳ Sơn districts and reach the Laos-Vietnam border at Nậm Cắn. In Nậm Cắn, National Route 7 connects with National Route 7 of Laos.

The last segment from Đô Lương to Nậm Cắn runs through Western Nghe An biosphere reserve including a part of Annamite Range.
