= Quỳnh Văn =

- Commune
- Interactive map of Quỳnh Văn
- Coordinates: 19.19968682048501°N 105.67364477178572°E
- Country: Vietnam
- Region: North Central Coast
- Province: Nghệ An
- Established: 16 June 2025
- Administrative headquarters: Hamlet 13

Area
  - Total: 53.35 km^{2} (20.60 sq mi)

Population (2025)
  - Total: 42,927
  - Density: 804/km^{2} (2,080/sq mi)

Quỳnh Văn is a commune in Nghệ An province, Vietnam.

Quỳnh Văn commune was established under Resolution No. 1678/NQ-UBTVQH15, issued by the Standing Committee of the National Assembly of Vietnam on 16 June 2025. Under the resolution, the entire area and population of Quỳnh Tân, Quỳnh Thạch, and Quỳnh Văn communes, formerly part of Quỳnh Lưu district, were merged to form a new commune named Quỳnh Văn.
