= Thái Hòa (town) =

- District-level town (Class-4)
- Thái Hòa Town; Thị xã Thái Hòa
- Country: Vietnam
- Region: North Central Coast
- Province: Nghệ An
- Established: 15 November 2007

Area
  - Total: 135.188 km^{2} (52.196 sq mi)

Population
  - Total: 70,870
  - Density: 498.7/km^{2} (1,292/sq mi)
- (2018)
- Time zone: UTC+07:00 (Indochina Time)

Thái Hòa is a former town of Nghệ An Province, in the North Central Coast region of Vietnam. It was established in November 2007 on the basis of Thái Hòa townlet (thị trấn Thái Hòa) and seven communes formerly belonging to Nghĩa Đàn District. At that time, it had 70,870 inhabitants on an area of 135 km^{2} (52 sq mi). Thái Hòa is the economic, cultural and social centre of north west Nghệ An.

== Geography ==
Thái Hòa has a border with Nghĩa Đàn District in the west, north and south and with Quỳnh Lưu District in the east. It is around 80 km north west of Vinh (the capital of Nghệ An Province), 40 km west of the coast and 14.5 km south of Thanh Hóa Province.

Thái Hòa is a hilly district. Lowlands and valleys make up only around 30% of the area, while hills make up 60% and mountains 10%. However, the terrain is still flat enough to be advantageous for the widespread development of agriculture. Some of the soil is suitable for growing high value cash crops such as coffee, rubber, tea, and fruits.

10152ha out of 13518ha of the district's land are used for agriculture. 307ha are unused.

Con River flows through the town as well as two of the southern communes of the district.

== Climate ==
Climate data for Tây Hiếu, Thái Hòa District
Month	Jan	Feb	Mar	Apr	May	Jun	Jul	Aug	Sep	Oct	Nov	Dec	Year
Record high °C (°F)	35.7 (96.3)	37.5 (99.5)	39.6 (103.3)	43.0 (109.4)	43.3 (109.9)	42.2 (108.0)	41.3 (106.3)	39.9 (103.8)	37.3 (99.1)	38.0 (100.4)	39.0 (102.2)	34.3 (93.7)	43.3 (109.9)
Mean daily maximum °C (°F)	21.2 (70.2)	22.2 (72.0)	25.2 (77.4)	30.0 (86.0)	33.4 (92.1)	34.2 (93.6)	34.2 (93.6)	32.8 (91.0)	31.0 (87.8)	28.6 (83.5)	25.7 (78.3)	22.7 (72.9)	28.5 (83.3)
Daily mean °C (°F)	17.0 (62.6)	18.1 (64.6)	20.7 (69.3)	24.5 (76.1)	27.5 (81.5)	28.8 (83.8)	28.8 (83.8)	27.7 (81.9)	26.4 (79.5)	24.1 (75.4)	21.1 (70.0)	17.9 (64.2)	23.6 (74.5)
Mean daily minimum °C (°F)	14.4 (57.9)	15.8 (60.4)	18.2 (64.8)	21.4 (70.5)	23.9 (75.0)	25.2 (77.4)	25.2 (77.4)	24.7 (76.5)	23.6 (74.5)	21.3 (70.3)	18.1 (64.6)	14.9 (58.8)	20.6 (69.1)
Record low °C (°F)	0.3 (32.5)	3.7 (38.7)	5.3 (41.5)	11.4 (52.5)	16.1 (61.0)	18.9 (66.0)	20.4 (68.7)	20.3 (68.5)	16.8 (62.2)	9.3 (48.7)	5.6 (42.1)	−0.2 (31.6)	−0.2 (31.6)
Average rainfall mm (inches)	22.1 (0.87)	20.7 (0.81)	30.3 (1.19)	61.6 (2.43)	149.5 (5.89)	166.2 (6.54)	179.5 (7.07)	266.7 (10.50)	345.1 (13.59)	269.4 (10.61)	59.5 (2.34)	21.7 (0.85)	1,608.2 (63.31)
Average rainy days	9.1	10.6	12.0	10.2	12.9	11.8	12.0	15.9	15.3	12.7	8.4	6.3	135.7
Average relative humidity (%)	87.2	87.9	87.3	85.1	81.5	80.4	80.5	85.3	87.3	86.7	85.7	85.4	84.9
Mean monthly sunshine hours	76.2	56.5	69.2	122.1	190.2	179.1	193.3	162.0	145.2	132.5	109.1	90.2	1,533.8
Source 1: Vietnam Institute for Building Science and Technology
Source 2: The Yearbook of Indochina (1930-1931)

== Demography ==
Thái Hòa has 67427 inhabitants, almost 500 per km2. 5751 are members of ethnic minorities, mainly Thanh, Thái, Thổ. 30750 are within working age and 35% of them involved in non-agricultural activities.

== Administrative divisions ==
The districts includes four urban wards (phường) and 6 rural communes (xã):

1. Quang Phong Ward
2. Hoà Hiếu Ward
3. Quang Tiến Ward
4. Long Sơn Ward
5. Nghĩa Hoà Commune
6. Tây Hiếu Commune
7. Nghĩa Mỹ Commune
8. Nghĩa Thuận Commune
9. Đông Hiếu Commune
10. Nghĩa Tiến Commune

== Economy ==
The structure of Thái Hòa's economy is as follows:

1. Agriculture, forestry, fishery: 17.3%
2. Industry, construction, mining: 30.2%
3. Services: 52.5%

Vinamilk invested more than 100 billion VND in the town in 2009. Since then, Thái Hòa is the site of the largest and most modern milk farm in Vietnam.

== Infrastructure ==
Thái Hoà is at the intersection of two national roads. National Road 48 connects it to National Route 1 in the east and the districts of Quế Phong, Quỳ Châu, and Quỳ Hợp in the west. There are no other national or provincial roads in these districts, which means that they are most conveniently accessed through Thái Hoà. National Road 15 connects the district to Thanh Hóa Province in the north and various other districts and provinces to the south.

There is also a branch of the North–South Railway leading up to Thái Hoà. However, it does not seem to be used.
