= Quế Phong =

- Commune
- Interactive map of Quế Phong
- Coordinates: 19.60903972175265°N 104.92920828176987°E
- Country: Vietnam
- Region: North Central Coast
- Province: Nghệ An
- Established: 16 June 2025

Area
  - Total: 276.57 km^{2} (106.78 sq mi)

Population (2025)
  - Total: 22,834
  - Density: 82/km^{2} (210/sq mi)

Quế Phong is a commune in Nghệ An province, Vietnam.

Quế Phong commune was established under Resolution No. 1678/NQ-UBTVQH15, issued by the Standing Committee of the National Assembly of Vietnam on 16 June 2025. Under the resolution, the entire area and population of Kim Sơn township and Châu Kim, Mường Nọc, and Nậm Giải communes, formerly part of Quế Phong district, were merged to form a new commune named Quế Phong.
