= Thạch Sơn =

Thạch Sơn may refer to several places in Vietnam, including:

- Thạch Sơn, Nghệ An, a rural commune of Anh Sơn District
- Thạch Sơn, Phú Thọ, a rural commune of Lâm Thao District
- Thạch Sơn, Hà Tĩnh, a rural commune of Thạch Hà District
- Thạch Sơn, Thanh Hóa, a rural commune of Thạch Thành District
- Former Thạch Sơn commune of Sơn Động District, Bắc Giang Province; now part of Phúc Sơn commune
