= Anh Sơn (disambiguation) =

Anh Sơn may refer to several places in Vietnam:

- Anh Sơn, a commune of Nghệ An province
- Anh Sơn District, a former rural district of Nghệ An Province
- Anh Sơn, Thanh Hóa, a former rural commune of Nghi Sơn town
