= Tương Dương =

- Commune
- Interactive map of Tương Dương
- Coordinates: 19.26436619577018°N 104.47008586816598°E
- Country: Vietnam
- Region: North Central Coast
- Province: Nghệ An
- Established: 16 June 2025

Area
  - Total: 330.95 km^{2} (127.78 sq mi)

Population (2025)
  - Total: 18,479
  - Density: 55/km^{2} (140/sq mi)

Tương Dương is a commune in Nghệ An province, Vietnam.

Tương Dương commune was established under Resolution No. 1678/NQ-UBTVQH15, issued by the Standing Committee of the National Assembly of Vietnam on 16 June 2025. Under the resolution, the entire area and population of Thạch Giám township, Lưu Kiền commune, and Xá Lượng commune, formerly part of Tương Dương district, were merged to form a new commune named Tương Dương.
