= Ky Son (disambiguation) =

Kỳ Sơn may refer to several places in Vietnam:

- Kỳ Sơn, a ward of Phú Thọ province
- Kỳ Sơn District, a former rural district of Nghệ An Province
- Kỳ Sơn District, a former rural district of Hòa Bình Province
- Kỳ Sơn, Hòa Bình, a former township and capital of Kỳ Sơn District, Hòa Bình Province
- Kỳ Sơn, Haiphong, a former commune of Thủy Nguyên District
- Kỳ Sơn, Hà Tĩnh, a former commune of Kỳ Anh District
- Kỳ Sơn, Tân Kỳ, a former commune of Tân Kỳ District, Nghệ An Province
- Kỳ Sơn, Hải Dương, a former commune of Tứ Kỳ District
