= Tropical Storm Nongfa =

Pacific tropical storm in 2025

Tropical Storm Nongfa (Jacinto)
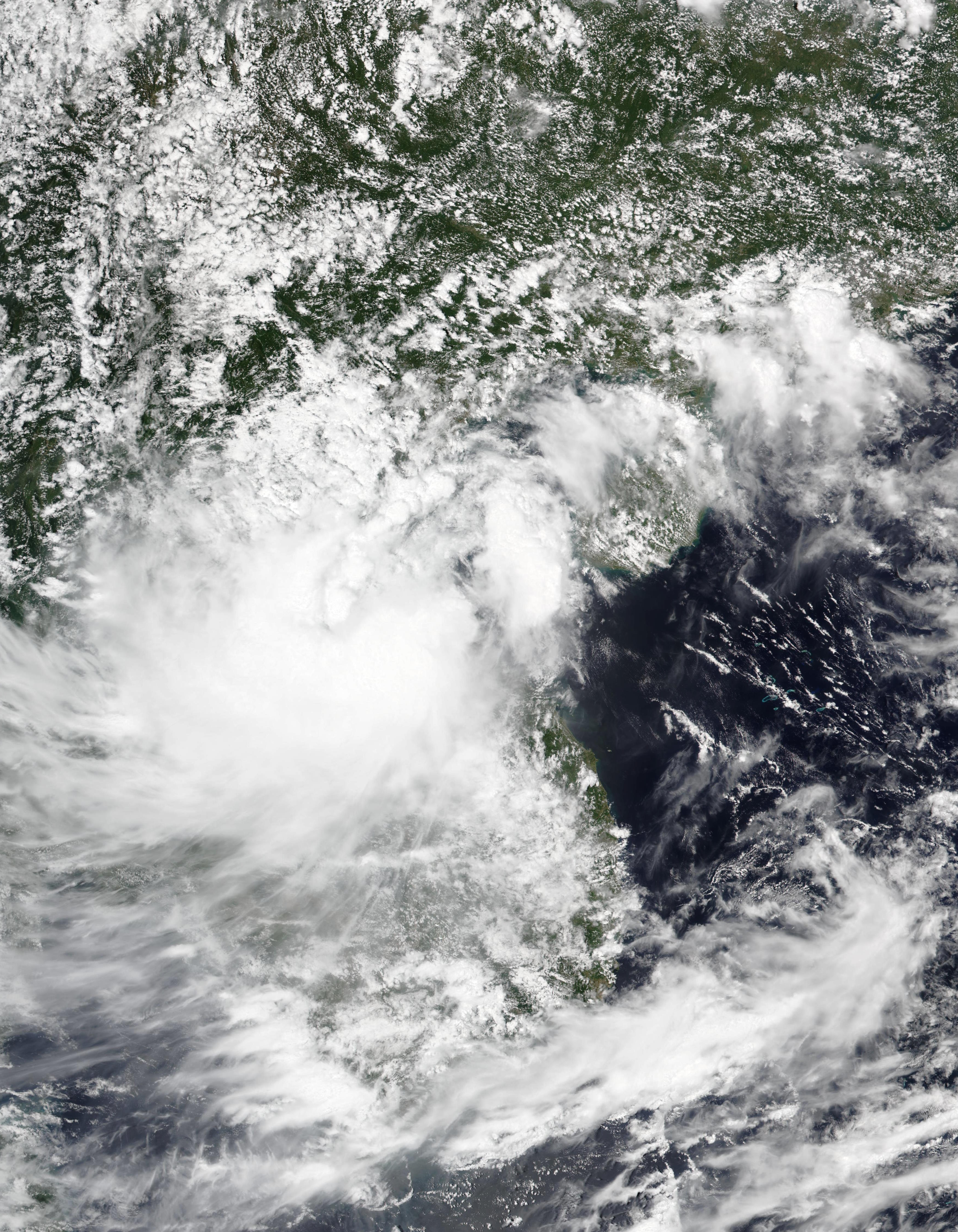
- Nongfa over Vietnam on August 30

Meteorological history
- Formed: August 27, 2025
- Dissipated: August 31, 2025

Tropical storm
- 10-minute sustained (JMA)
- Highest winds: 75 km/h (45 mph)
- Lowest pressure: 996 hPa (mbar); 29.41 inHg

Tropical storm
- 1-minute sustained (SSHWS/JTWC)
- Highest winds: 75 km/h (45 mph)
- Lowest pressure: 996 hPa (mbar); 29.41 inHg

Overall effects
- Fatalities: 1
- Damage: $3.59 million (2025 USD)
- Areas affected: Philippines, Vietnam, Hong Kong, Macau, Hainan, Laos, Thailand
- Part of the 2025 Pacific typhoon season

Tropical Storm Nongfa, (Note: The name Nongfa (Lao: ໜອງຟ້າ, [nɔːŋ˩ faː˥˨]) was contributed by Laos and refers to Nong Fa Lake in Lao.) known in the Philippines as Tropical Depression Jacinto, was a weak tropical cyclone that struck Vietnam and affected the Philippines as a precursor low in late August 2025. The fourteenth named storm of the 2025 Pacific typhoon season, Nongfa's origins can be traced from a disturbance east of Mindanao, which eventually crossed the Philippine archipelago before gradually becoming a tropical depression west of Luzon on August 27, 2025. Nongfa later entered in the South China Sea, where it strengthened into a tropical storm before it made landfall over Quảng Trị and Hà Tĩnh on August 30.

== Meteorological history ==
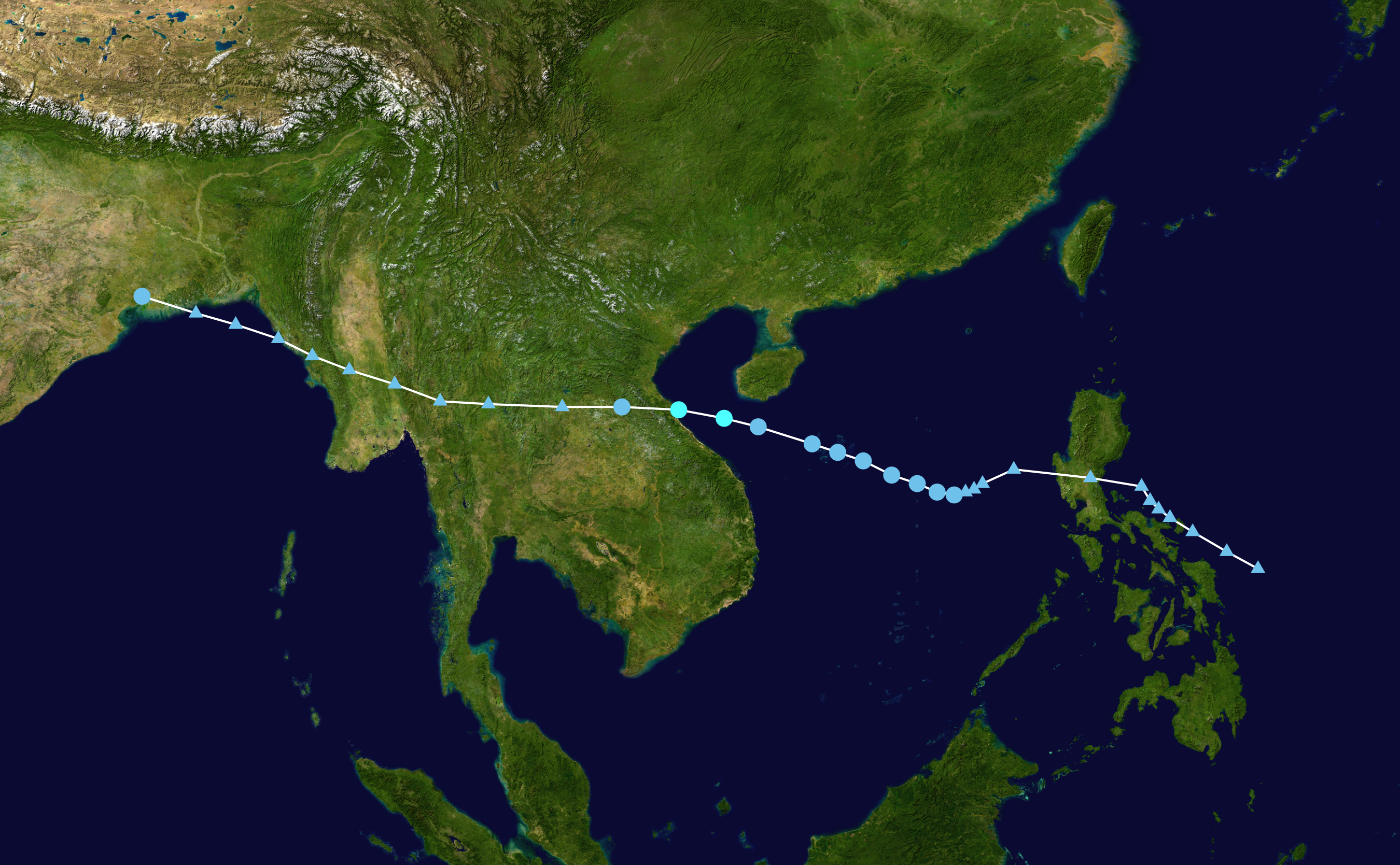
Map plotting the storm's track and intensity, according to the Saffir–Simpson scale Map key Saffir–Simpson scale Tropical depression (≤38 mph, ≤62 km/h) Tropical storm (39–73 mph, 63–118 km/h) Category 1 (74–95 mph, 119–153 km/h) Category 2 (96–110 mph, 154–177 km/h) Category 3 (111–129 mph, 178–208 km/h) Category 4 (130–156 mph, 209–251 km/h) Category 5 (≥157 mph, ≥252 km/h) Unknown Storm type Tropical cyclone Subtropical cyclone Extratropical cyclone, remnant low, tropical disturbance, or monsoon depression

On August 23, 2025, the PAGASA began tracking a weather system that originated from an area of low pressure just east of Surigao del Sur on Mindanao. On August 27, the JMA began monitoring the same system, identifying it as a tropical depression located approximately 106 nautical miles (196 km) off the northwestern coast of Luzon. However, six hours later, the JMA downgraded the system back to a low-pressure area. This decision was later reversed in their next weather advisory bulletin, where the system was once again classified as a tropical depression. On August 28, PAGASA also upgraded the disturbance to a tropical depression, assigning it the local name Jacinto, the replacement name for Jolina. JTWC subsequently issued a TCFA and initially classified the system as a monsoon depression. A few hours later, the JTWC reclassified it as a tropical depression and designated it as 20W as it moved westwards. 20W then moved into the South China Sea under a marginally favourable environment, characterised by northerly to northeasterly upper-level flow that slightly hindered development. Satellite imagery also depicted a partially exposed low-level circulation centre (LLCC), with disorganised convection flaring over the southern quadrant. On August 30, 20W was upgraded to a tropical storm and assigned the name Nongfa by the JMA, the replacement name for Faxai following its retirement after it devastated Japan in 2019. It was accompanied by vigorous convection with deep, cold cloud tops and tightening rainbands, indicating a mature structure. Shortly after, Nongfa made landfall between Quảng Trị and Hà Tĩnh at 15:30 ICT (08:30 UTC). The storm later interacted with land, moving westward through mountainous terrains in Vietnam and Laos. Both agencies issued their final advisories on August 31 as the system weakened into a remnant trough. The remnants of Nongfa later crossed into the Bay of Bengal but did not redevelop, as it remained over the basin only briefly before making landfall in India. On September 6, the remnants of Nongfa entered North Indian Basin and developed into a new system that consolidated into a depression over southwestern Rajasthan state in India. The following day, the resulting system strengthened into a deep depression, becoming Deep Depression LAND 04.

== Preparations and impact ==
=== Philippines ===
The PAGASA issued warnings for heavy rainfall, while the National Disaster Risk Reduction and Management Council (NDRRMC) reported that 203,490 individuals were affected, and damages to infrastructure topped up to ₱710,000 (US$12,076.74) due to the combined effects of the storm and the Habagat (southwest monsoon).

=== Hong Kong and Macau ===
On August 28, the HKO issued the Standby Signal No. 1 at 19:10 HKT (11:10 UTC) and Macau's SMG issued the same signal at 19:00 MST (11:00 UTC). All signals were later cancelled and was replaced with the Strong Monsoon Signal for respective territories at 18:10 HKT (10:10 UTC) and 16:30 MST (08:30 UTC) on August 29.

=== Vietnam ===
On August 30, the country's Prime Minister Phạm Minh Chính instructed and urged localities and authorities to guide vessels to return to safety shelters, and to deploy all forces, equipments, and supplies to ensure response, relief, and rescue operations on time. Mai Văn Khiêm, the director of the National Centre for Hydro-Meteorological Forecasting, also warned the citizens regarding heavy thunderstorms accompanied by tornadoes, ahead from the tropical storm's impact.

Nongfa unleashed downpours in Vietnam, cutting off roads and dozens of mountain villages during its landfall between the Quảng Trị and the Hà Tĩnh provinces. In the Hà Tĩnh province, roads in the Hương Khê District submerged, forcing road closures in National Highway 15. In the Phúc Trạch commune, 46 households of the Chứt ethnic minority were isolated. Hương Khê also experienced some cars and motorbikes flooded on Trần Phú Street, while incomplete drainages worsened the flooding. In Nghệ An, officials banned all sea activities by August 30 and returned all fishing boats to shore. According to Trần Phong, the chairman of Quảng Trị, provincial authorities conducted emergency meetings on August 29 to coordinate evacuation and storm responses. A man died while fishing because of drowning.

Damage in Vietnam reached 90 billion dong (US$3.58 million).

=== Thailand ===
On August 31, The Department of Disaster Prevention and Mitigation (DDPM) reported that the rapidly rising surge of water from the upper part of the Pa Sak River, caused some dikes and roads to breach and inundate with the Lom Sak area, which quickly submerged the government buildings, businesses, markets, and homes. They also confirmed that the sensor in the Tat Kloy station in the Lom Kao district measured a record-high 12.6 metre water level before being submerged. The heaviest rainfall was recorded in the Nam Nao district, with 151 millimetres falling to the Lak Dan sub-district alone.

493 households were damaged due to the storm's onslaught according to a full damage assessment, including a school, a bridge, and two roads. the Mueang Phetchabun district chief Sompong Thongnunui informed that the said district will receive water from the Lom Sak and Khao Kho districts, after the continuous rainfall caused by the storm.

On September 3, Prasert Jantararuangtong, Thailand’s Deputy Prime Minister and Minister of the Digital Economy and Society, expressed concern over flooding across several regions affected by Nongfa and the prevailing monsoon trough. He noted that the storm had brought heavy rainfall to the Pa Sak, Yom, and Nan river basins.

Nongfa also triggered flash floods in Phetchabun Province, particularly affecting residential and agricultural areas in the districts of Lom Kao, Nam Nao, Lom Sak, Mueang Phetchabun, and Nong Phai. Authorities evacuated vulnerable residents and moved belongings to higher ground as water levels began to recede, eventually flowing into the Pa Sak Jolasid Dam. Heavy rainfall near the Sirikit Dam led to a rapid rise in the Nan River, especially in Phitsanulok, prompting dam operators to reduce water discharge to mitigate downstream flooding. Meanwhile, overflow at the Mae Mok Dam, which exceeded its storage capacity—was released through the spillway, causing increased water levels in the Yom River basin.

In response, Prasert instructed the Office of the National Water Resources (ONWR) to establish temporary water management centers around the affected basins to ensure effective flood response and water flow control. Emergency assistance was also mobilized for affected communities. He emphasized that all flood response centers must continuously monitor the situation and coordinate closely to address flood-related issues.

== See also ==
- Weather of 2025
- Tropical cyclones in 2025
