= Trần Nam Hải =

Vietnamese footballer

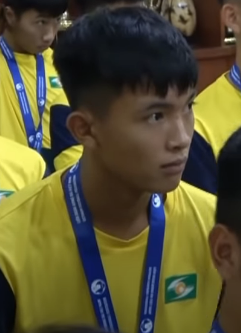
- Trần Nam Hải in 2020

Personal information
- Full name: Trần Nam Hải
- Date of birth: 5 February 2004 (age 22)
- Place of birth: Thanh Chương, Nghệ An, Vietnam
- Height: 1.83 m (6 ft 0 in)
- Positions: Midfielder; center back

Team information
- Current team: Sông Lam Nghệ An
- Number: 17

Youth career
- 2017–2022: Sông Lam Nghệ An

Senior career*
Years	Team	Apps	(Gls)
2022–	Sông Lam Nghệ An	60	(1)

International career^{‡}
2023–2025	Vietnam U20	2	(0)
2023–2025	Vietnam U23	10	(0)
Medal record
Men's football
Representing Vietnam
AFF U-23 Championship
Winner	Thailand 2023
- * Club domestic league appearances and goals as of 7 June 2026 ‡ National team caps and goals as of 13 October 2025

Trần Nam Hải (born 5 February 2004) is a Vietnamese professional footballer who plays as a midfielder or center back for V.League 1 club Sông Lam Nghệ An.

== Club career ==
Nam Hải was a member of the Sông Lam Nghệ An football academy. In August 2022, he was promoted to Sông Lam Nghệ An's first team and was included in the team squad list for the second half of the season. He scored his first professional goal on 4 February 2023 against SHB Đà Nẵng in the opening game of the 2023 V.League 1

== International career ==
Nam Hải was named in Vietnam U20 squad for the 2023 AFC U-20 Championship. He made two appearances during the tournament, both as a substitute player.

Later in the year, Nam Hải was part of the Vietnam U23 that win the 2023 AFF U-23 Championship, starting as a center-back throughout the tournament.

== Honours ==
Vietnam U23

- AFF U-23 Championship: 2023
