= Kim Hoa =

- Close-up view of Tràm Mây Mountain before sunset
- Interactive map of Kim Hoa
- Coordinates: 18°29′28″N 105°27′15″E
- Country: Vietnam
- Region: North Central Coast
- Province: Hà Tĩnh
- Established: 16 June 2025

Area
  - Total: 88.28 km^{2} (34.09 sq mi)

Population (2025)
  - Total: 19,114
  - Density: 216/km^{2} (560/sq mi)

Kim Hoa is a commune in Hà Tĩnh province, Vietnam.

On 16 June 2025, the Standing Committee of the National Assembly of Vietnam issued Resolution No. 1665/NQ-UBTVQH15. Under the resolution, the entire area and population of Hàm Trường commune and Kim Hoa commune were merged to form a new commune named Kim Hoa.
