= Nguyễn Hồng Giáp =

Vietnamese scholar (born 1934)

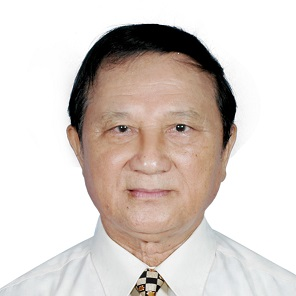
- Nguyễn Hồng Giáp, Doctor in History
- Born: September 21, 1934; Nam Thành, Yên Thành, Nghệ An (Vietnam)
- Education: Sorbonne University
- Children: Nguyễn Thái Ðông, Nguyễn Thái San, Nguyễn Kiều Lan, Nguyễn Kiều Tiên, Nguyễn Kiều Diễm, Nguyễn Kiều Hạnh, Nguyễn Kiều Nhi
- Scientific career
- Fields: History, Economy, Tourism
- Workplaces: Tân Thanh School

Nguyễn Hồng Giáp (born 21 September 1934) is a Vietnamese scholar.

== Biography ==
He was born September 21, 1934, in Nam Thành village, Yên Thành district, Nghệ An province, to a family of wealthy Catholic rice farmers; his father Nguyễn Ðình Long (1906-1976) and several family members were persecuted during the great land reform (1954). When he was in primary and secondary school, he studied at Vinh - Bến Thủy, Nha Trang and Thủ Đức Saigon (1948-1960), then moved to France (1960-1973) and got a Ph.D. in history and a master's degree in economics at the Sorbonne University, Paris.

He returned to Vietnam in 1973, teaching history and economics at Dalat University, and served as vice-dean of the Faculty of Literature (the dean was Pr. Nguyễn Khắc Dương).

After the reunification of Vietnam (1975), he was among the few professors who did not emigrate and stayed at Dalat University, even though during the next ten years he was not allowed to teach. He rather took part in the preservation of the university off material decays. Then he studied the life of various Tây Nguyên ethnic people (he is the co-author with Pr. Nguyễn Khắc Tụng of « North Tây Nguyên ethnic people collective meeting spaces on pilotis »).

Between 1990 and 2012, he began teaching again and also took part in several administrative activities. He became successively general manager of Ðông Phương Bảo Lộc Bank (1990), director of Trí Dũng Management School in Ho Chi Minh City (1993), teacher in economics at Văn Lang University, Ho Chi Minh City (1995), dean of the School of Ho Chi Minh City, Techniques and Technology (1998), head of formation and dean of the Faculty of Management and Tourism at the University of Cửu Long, Vĩnh Long (2000), and assistant rector of Hồng Bàng University, Ho Chi Minh City (2003). He created and became director of the Ho Chi Minh City Research and Tourism development Center (2005), then created and became President of the Administration Board of Tân Thanh Economics and Tourism School, Ho Chi Minh City (2007-2012).

== Notable works ==
- Làng xã Việt Nam, (Villages and Hamlets of Vietnam), NXB University of Dalat 1974.
- Nhà Rông các dân tộc Bắc Tây nguyên, (North Tây Nguyên Ethnic People Meeting Houses on Pilotis), NXB Khoa học Xã hội, Hanoi 1991.
- Kinh tế học vi mô, (Micro-economics), NXB Thống kê, Ho Chi Minh City 1995, reedited 2002.
- Chiến lược kinh doanh, (Business Strategy), teaching materials, University of Technics and Technology, Ho Chi Minh City.
- Kinh tế Du lịch, (Tourism Economics), NXB Tuổi Trẻ, Ho Chi Minh City 2002.
- Quản trị nguồn nhân lực, (Human resources Management), teaching materials, Tân Thanh School, 2007.

== Family ==
He has seven children:

- Nguyễn Thái Ðông (a.k.a. Marc-Antoine Nguyen), born in 1963 in Paris (France), translator (Saigon Eco and FAFILM), and xiangqi expert (author of « Xiangqi : L'univers des échecs chinois »).
- Nguyễn Thái San, movie actor, MBA in Tourism.
- Nguyễn Kiều Lan, born in 1966 in Antony (France), physician.
- Nguyễn Kiều Tiên, born in 1968 in Paris (France).
- Nguyễn Kiều Diễm, born in 1978 in Dalat (Vietnam).
- Nguyễn Kiều Hạnh, born 1981 in Dalat (Vietnam).
- Nguyễn Kiều Nhi, born 1983 in Dalat (Vietnam).
