= Quỳnh Lưu district =

Coordinates: 19.167°N 105.667°E

Quỳnh Lưu district Huyện Quỳnh Lưu
- Rural District
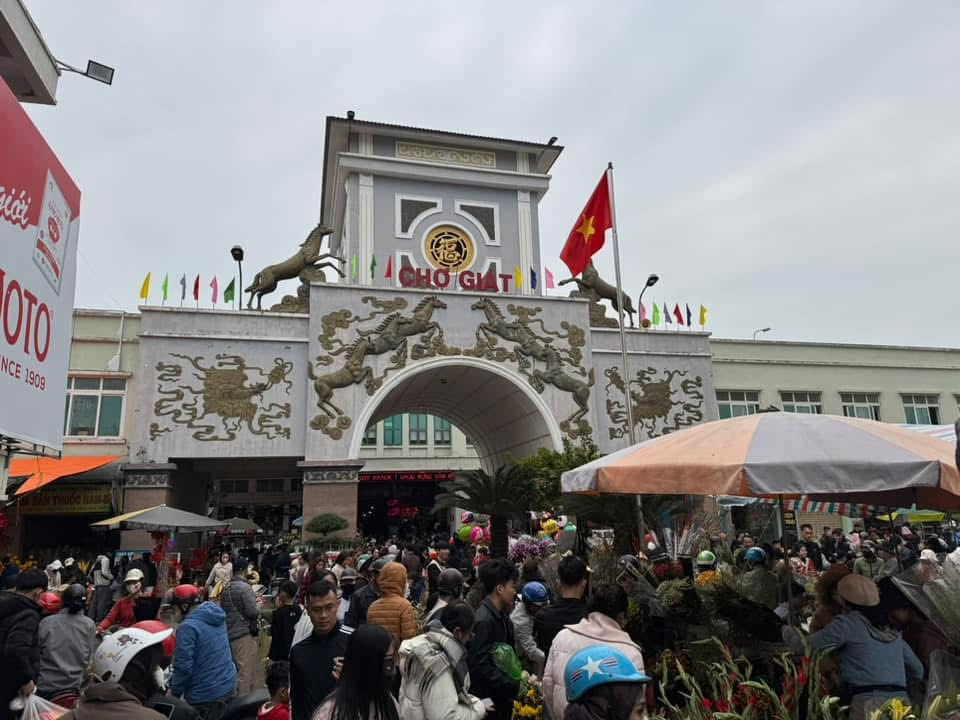
- Giát market.
- Interactive map of Quỳnh Lưu district
- Country: Vietnam
- Region: North Central Coast
- Province: Nghệ An
- Central agency: Hamlet 7, Quỳnh Hồng commune

Government
  - Type: Rural district

Area
  - Total: 235 sq mi (609 km^{2})

Population (01 April 2019)
  - Total: 276,259
  - Density: 1,657/sq mi (639.7/km^{2})
- Time zone: UTC+07:00 (Indochina Time)
- ZIP code: 43000
- Website: Quynhluu.Nghean.gov.vn; Quynhluu.Nghean.dcs.vn

Quỳnh Lưu is a former rural district of Nghệ An province, in the northmost part of the lanky Central Coast region of Vietnam.

== History ==
In the area of Quỳnh Lưu rural district about 1956, an international shocking political event occurred, which was often called the Quỳnh Lưu uprising (Vietnamese: Khởi nghĩa Quỳnh Lưu) by South Vietnamese historians.

At least two Catholic villages have been armed to protest the brutal land reform policy of the Central Government of North Vietnam. This action has bloated the fire of anger across the North and caused the Democratic Republic of Vietnam leaders to seriously divide.

In order to extinguish the effect of the oil spot, the government of Hồ Chí Minh personally mobilized two elite divisions to his homeland "to punish the rebellious" (dẹp tan bè-lũ phản-động). Although the evolution of the event was lighter by communist communication organizations, the information about it still followed the fugents to go around the world.

The Ngô Đình Diệm government has made this opportunity to organize an international press conference in Saigon to denounce the crimes of the North regime. During the next two years, the people of South Vietnam continued to organize marches and exhibitions to express their communion with the fate of their compatriots in the North of the 17th parallel. From then until 1975 when the Republic of Vietnam collapsed, the catastrophic event in Quỳnh Lưu was included in the history textbook.

== Culture ==
Its name Quỳnh-lưu was a Hanese word, what appeared in 1430 by the Early Lê dynasty. By scholars Thiều Chửu and Lê Chí Quế's ideas, it could be a negative way of Malayo-Polynesian name Keluar or Kuala ("the seaport"), which is repeated in many locations along the Pacific Ocean. Previously, it belonged to an area without official boundaries, which was still called as Vọng-giang by some local officials from Tang dynasty.

This rural district is often said to be the hometown of an 18th-century literary figure : Female poet Hồ Xuân Hương.

== Geography ==
As of 1 April 2019, Quỳnh Lưu rural district had a population of 276,259. However, from 2003 to present, the whole rural district has continuously reduced the population because the situation of young people pulled together to the cities to seek employment opportunities, and the quality of agriculture of the locality is not high, while the industry has very little potential.

It covers an area of 609 km^{2}, that is, it is equivalent to Singapore Island. Previously, its capital was located at block 3 of Cầu Giát township ("the bridge of Giát"), however, the district central agency has been transferred to hamlet 7 of Quỳnh Hồng commune since 2024.

Currently, Quỳnh Lưu has all 33 commune-level administrative units.

- 1 municipality : Cầu Giát township.
- 32 communes : An Hòa, Ngọc Sơn, Quỳnh Bá, Quỳnh Bảng, Quỳnh Châu, Quỳnh Diễn, Quỳnh Đôi, Quỳnh Giang, Quỳnh Hậu, Quỳnh Hoa, Quỳnh Hồng (district's capital), Quỳnh Hưng, Quỳnh Lâm, Quỳnh Long, Quỳnh Lương, Quỳnh Minh, Quỳnh Mỹ, Quỳnh Nghĩa, Quỳnh Ngọc, Quỳnh Tam, Quỳnh Tân, Quỳnh Thạch, Quỳnh Thanh, Quỳnh Thắng, Quỳnh Thọ, Quỳnh Thuận, Quỳnh Văn, Quỳnh Yên, Sơn Hải, Tân Sơn, Tân Thắng, Tiến Thủy.

=== Climate ===
Climate data for Quỳnh Lưu
Month	Jan	Feb	Mar	Apr	May	Jun	Jul	Aug	Sep	Oct	Nov	Dec	Year
Record high °C (°F)	33.5 (92.3)	34.3 (93.7)	37.0 (98.6)	42.0 (107.6)	40.4 (104.7)	40.2 (104.4)	39.7 (103.5)	38.8 (101.8)	37.4 (99.3)	34.5 (94.1)	33.6 (92.5)	30.7 (87.3)	42.0 (107.6)
Mean daily maximum °C (°F)	20.5 (68.9)	21.0 (69.8)	23.4 (74.1)	27.5 (81.5)	31.5 (88.7)	33.3 (91.9)	33.2 (91.8)	32.1 (89.8)	30.6 (87.1)	28.2 (82.8)	25.4 (77.7)	22.1 (71.8)	27.4 (81.3)
Daily mean °C (°F)	17.5 (63.5)	18.2 (64.8)	20.4 (68.7)	24.0 (75.2)	27.5 (81.5)	29.2 (84.6)	29.3 (84.7)	28.3 (82.9)	27.0 (80.6)	24.8 (76.6)	21.9 (71.4)	18.7 (65.7)	23.9 (75.0)
Mean daily minimum °C (°F)	15.4 (59.7)	16.5 (61.7)	18.6 (65.5)	21.8 (71.2)	24.7 (76.5)	26.2 (79.2)	26.3 (79.3)	25.6 (78.1)	24.5 (76.1)	22.3 (72.1)	19.3 (66.7)	16.2 (61.2)	21.4 (70.5)
Record low °C (°F)	5.7 (42.3)	7.1 (44.8)	8.4 (47.1)	13.3 (55.9)	17.7 (63.9)	19.8 (67.6)	21.4 (70.5)	21.5 (70.7)	17.6 (63.7)	14.4 (57.9)	9.1 (48.4)	5.5 (41.9)	5.5 (41.9)
Average precipitation mm (inches)	17.8 (0.70)	21.3 (0.84)	30.7 (1.21)	54.1 (2.13)	103.2 (4.06)	132.7 (5.22)	133.2 (5.24)	243.5 (9.59)	409.0 (16.10)	351.6 (13.84)	95.2 (3.75)	32.0 (1.26)	1,624.2 (63.94)
Average rainy days	8.8	10.2	11.3	9.9	10.9	9.2	9.1	13.5	14.9	13.8	9.0	6.7	127.4
Average relative humidity (%)	86.2	88.3	89.9	89.0	84.4	80.2	80.4	85.0	86.1	84.5	83.2	83.1	85.0
Mean monthly sunshine hours	78.4	60.2	73.4	132.1	216.7	200.9	216.7	183.9	161.5	148.2	123.0	101.3	1,692.6
Source: Vietnam Institute for Building Science and Technology

== See also ==
- Anh Sơn
- Cẩm Xuyên
- Kỳ Anh
- Quỳ Hợp
