= Nam Đàn =

Nam Đàn Xã Nam Đàn
- Commune
- Nam Đàn commune
- Location within Vietnam
- Coordinates: 18°41′52″N 105°30′00″E
- Country: Vietnam
- Region: North Central Coast
- Province: Nghệ An
- Time zone: UTC+7 (UTC + 7)

Nam Đàn is a commune (xã) of Nghệ An Province, Vietnam.
