= Nghĩa Đàn =

Nghĩa Đàn Xã Nghĩa Đàn
- Commune
- Nghĩa Đàn commune
- Location within Vietnam
- Coordinates: 19°20′20″N 105°29′35″E
- Country: Vietnam
- Region: North Central Coast
- Province: Nghệ An
- Time zone: UTC+7 (UTC + 7)

Nghĩa Đàn is a commune (xã) of Nghệ An Province, Vietnam.
