= Quang Tiến =

Quang Tiến may refer to several places in Vietnam, including:

- Quang Tiến, Nghệ An, a ward of Thái Hòa
- Quang Tiến, Hanoi, a commune of Sóc Sơn District
- Quang Tiến, Bắc Giang, a commune of Tân Yên District
