= Đại Đồng, Nghệ An =

Đại Đồng Xã Đại Đồng
- Commune
- Đại Đồng commune
- Location within Vietnam
- Coordinates: 18°47′07″N 105°20′03″E
- Country: Vietnam
- Region: North Central Coast
- Province: Nghệ An
- Time zone: UTC+7 (UTC + 7)

Đại Đồng is a commune (xã) of Nghệ An Province, Vietnam.
