= Diễn Châu =

Diễn Châu Xã Diễn Châu
- Commune
- Diễn Châu commune
- Location within Vietnam
- Coordinates: 18°58′40″N 105°36′03″E
- Country: Vietnam
- Region: North Central Coast
- Province: Nghệ An
- Time zone: UTC+7 (UTC + 7)

Diễn Châu is a commune (xã) of Nghệ An Province, Vietnam.
