= Phan Van Quy =

Vietnamese politician (born 1954)

Phan Van Quy (born 1954 in Nghệ An) is a member of Vietnam's XIII National Assembly represented Nghệ An province and a member of the National Assembly's Judicial Committee.

He enlisted late 1971, he is a wounded ex-serviceman class 4/4 and has been awarded the title Hero of the People's Armed Forces in 1976. The car he used to drive along Truong Son trail was Zin 157 is now on displayed at the Museum of Logistics of Vietnam People's Army.

Pacific Corporation that he is the founder and Chairman is the founder of three social organizations, charities: Central Vietnam Disaster Prevention Support Fund, Nghệ An Benevolent Foundation For The Gifted and Vietnam Martyrs Family Support Association.
