= Cẩm Xuyên =

Cẩm Xuyên Xã Cẩm Xuyên
- Commune
- Cẩm Xuyên commune
- Location within Vietnam
- Coordinates: 18°15′03″N 106°00′04″E
- Country: Vietnam
- Region: North Central Coast
- Province: Hà Tĩnh
- Time zone: UTC+7 (UTC + 7)

Cẩm Xuyên is a commune (xã) of Hà Tĩnh Province, Vietnam.
