= Hương Khê =

Hương Khê Xã Hương Khê
- Commune
- Hương Khê commune
- Location within Vietnam
- Coordinates: 18°10′22″N 105°42′12″E
- Country: Vietnam
- Region: North Central Coast
- Province: Hà Tĩnh
- Time zone: UTC+7 (UTC + 7)

Hương Khê (Vietnamese pronunciation: [hɨəŋ˧ χe˧]) is a commune (xã) of Hà Tĩnh Province, Vietnam.
