= Kỳ Anh district =

Coordinates: 18.1264°N 106.2575°E

Kỳ Anh district Huyện Kỳ Anh
- Rural District
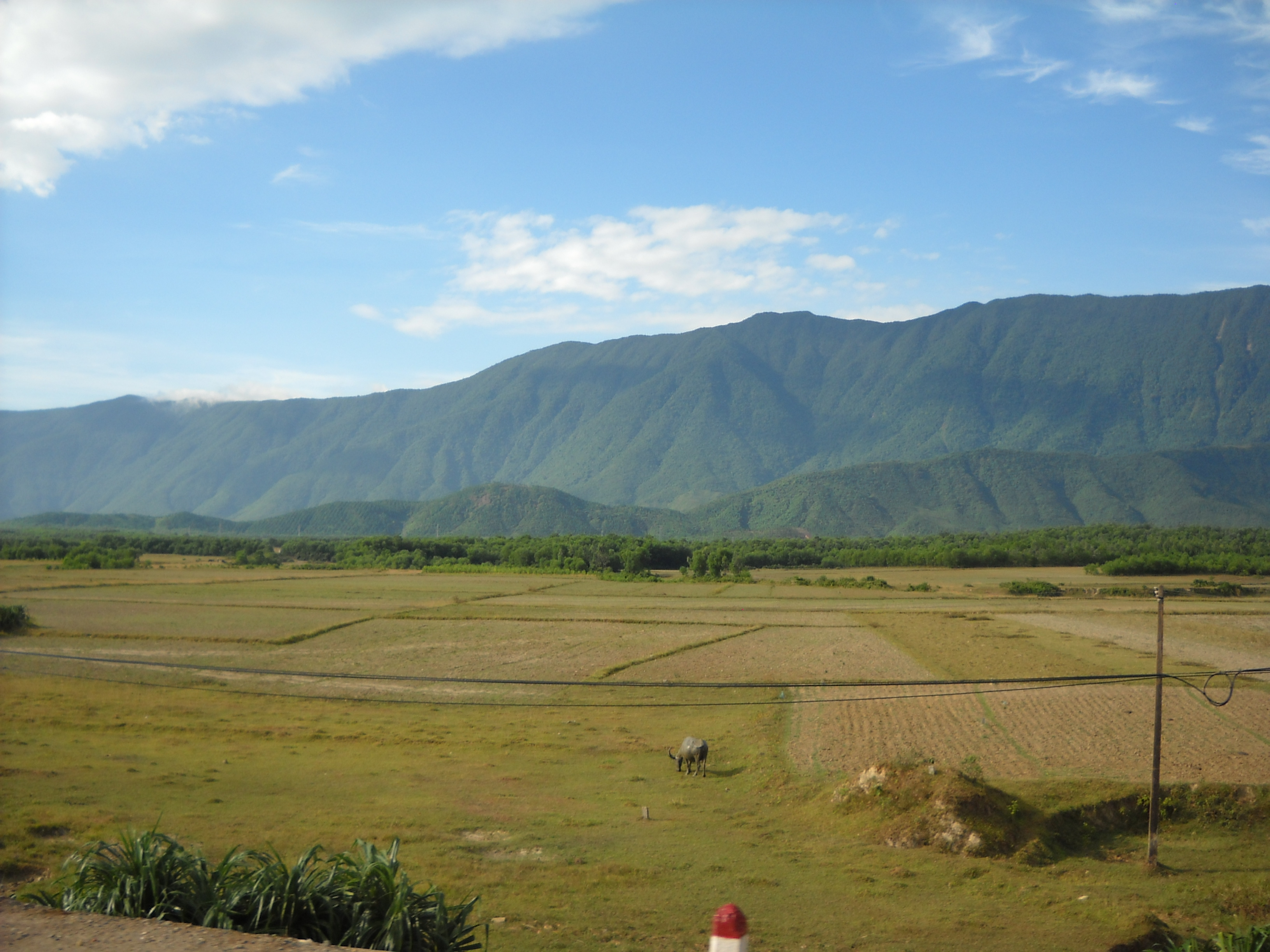
- Hoành Sơn Range as seen from Hà Tĩnh

- Seal
- Interactive map of Kỳ Anh district
- Country: Vietnam
- Region: North Central Coast
- Province: Hà Tĩnh
- Central agency: Kỳ Anh town

Government
  - Type: Rural district

Area
  - Total: 294.062 sq mi (761.617 km^{2})

Population (2015)
  - Total: 120,518
  - Density: 420/sq mi (161/km^{2})
- Time zone: UTC+07:00 (Indochina Time)
- ZIP code: 3000425953-004

Kỳ Anh is a rural district of Hà Tĩnh province in the North Central Coast region of Vietnam.

== History ==
By Thiều Chửu and Lê Chí Quế's researches, its name Kỳ-anh or Kỳ-la (old) in Hanese text was originated from Malayo-Polynesian name Keluar. It is an ancient word what the gossip indicates the interlaced seaports in the North-central of modern Vietnam.

From 16 May 2015, Ky Anh District separated into two administrative units : Ky Anh Town and Ky Anh District (new).

== Geography ==
As of 2015 Kỳ Anh rural district had a population of 120,518. The rural district covers an area of 1,058 km^{2} (408 sq mi).

The district capital lies at Kỳ Anh town.

=== Climate ===
Climate data for Kỳ Anh
Month	Jan	Feb	Mar	Apr	May	Jun	Jul	Aug	Sep	Oct	Nov	Dec	Year
Record high °C (°F)	34.2 (93.6)	35.6 (96.1)	38.0 (100.4)	41.1 (106.0)	40.7 (105.3)	40.4 (104.7)	39.9 (103.8)	39.2 (102.6)	39.0 (102.2)	35.2 (95.4)	34.0 (93.2)	31.8 (89.2)	41.1 (106.0)
Mean daily maximum °C (°F)	20.7 (69.3)	21.4 (70.5)	24.1 (75.4)	28.6 (83.5)	32.2 (90.0)	33.9 (93.0)	33.9 (93.0)	32.9 (91.2)	30.6 (87.1)	27.9 (82.2)	24.9 (76.8)	21.6 (70.9)	27.7 (81.9)
Daily mean °C (°F)	17.9 (64.2)	18.8 (65.8)	21.1 (70.0)	24.8 (76.6)	28.1 (82.6)	29.9 (85.8)	29.9 (85.8)	28.9 (84.0)	27.0 (80.6)	24.7 (76.5)	21.9 (71.4)	18.9 (66.0)	24.3 (75.7)
Mean daily minimum °C (°F)	15.9 (60.6)	16.9 (62.4)	19.0 (66.2)	22.2 (72.0)	25.2 (77.4)	27.1 (80.8)	27.1 (80.8)	26.2 (79.2)	24.5 (76.1)	22.4 (72.3)	19.8 (67.6)	16.9 (62.4)	21.9 (71.4)
Record low °C (°F)	5.8 (42.4)	8.1 (46.6)	7.4 (45.3)	13.2 (55.8)	14.8 (58.6)	19.9 (67.8)	22.2 (72.0)	22.1 (71.8)	17.3 (63.1)	15.2 (59.4)	11.2 (52.2)	6.9 (44.4)	5.8 (42.4)
Average precipitation mm (inches)	110.9 (4.37)	69.5 (2.74)	64.3 (2.53)	64.1 (2.52)	150.3 (5.92)	118.1 (4.65)	105.9 (4.17)	234.2 (9.22)	554.1 (21.81)	747.8 (29.44)	408.6 (16.09)	202.8 (7.98)	2,817.5 (110.93)
Average rainy days	15.7	14.2	13.3	10.0	10.5	7.3	7.1	11.0	15.7	18.9	17.8	16.2	157.7
Average relative humidity (%)	90.5	91.6	90.4	87.1	80.0	73.1	71.4	77.1	84.9	87.5	87.5	87.8	84.0
Mean monthly sunshine hours	68.9	60.2	86.6	147.5	218.9	219.0	227.3	190.6	153.4	118.0	80.1	64.3	1,636.8
Source: Vietnam Institute for Building Science and Technology

== See also ==
- Cẩm Xuyên district
- Thạch Hà district
