= Tương Dương district =

Coordinates: 19.667°N 104.667°E

Tương Dương District Huyện Tương Dương
- District
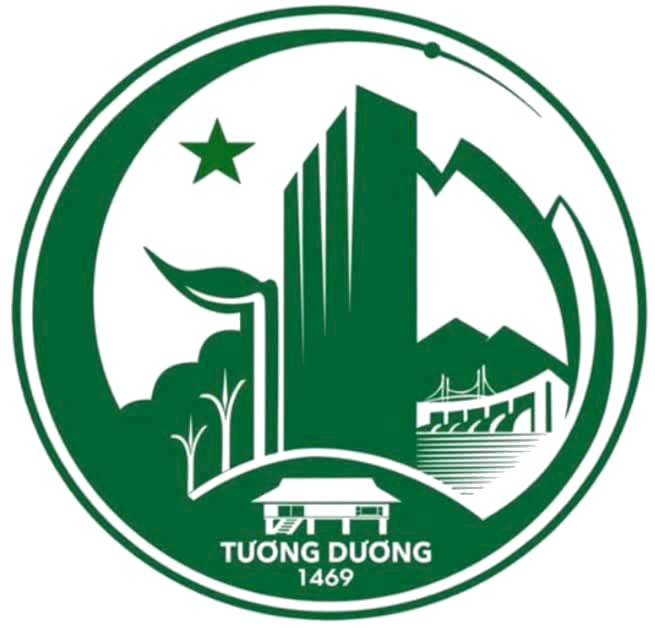
- Seal
- Interactive map of Tương Dương District
- Country: Vietnam
- Region: North Central Coast
- Province: Nghệ An
- Capital: Thạch Giám

Area
  - Total: 1,085.69 sq mi (2,811.92 km^{2})

Population (2019 census)
  - Total: 77,830
  - Density: 71.69/sq mi (27.68/km^{2})
- Time zone: UTC+07:00 (Indochina Time)

Tương Dương is a former rural district of Nghệ An province, in the North Central Coast region of Vietnam. As of 2019 the district had a population of 77,830. The district covers an area of 2,811.92 km^{2}. The district capital lies at Thạch Giám township.

== Geography ==
Tuong Duong is a highland mountainous district located in the southwest of Nghe An province, nearly 200 km from the city of Vinh and 90 km from Nam Can border gate; the district has an area more than 3 times larger than the province of Bac Ninh and nearly twice the size of Thai Binh province, passing through by National Route 7, with a total border length. The border with Laos is 59.73 km. Tuong Duong district is geographically located:

- Western borders the district Ky Son
- North and South borders on Laos
- Northeast direction borders the district Que Phong
- Eastern border with Qui Chau district
- Southeast direction borders the Con Cuong district.

=== Natural Condition ===
The district has a natural area of 2812.07 km^{2} (accounting for 17% of the province's area), and is the district-level unit with the largest area in Nghe An province and the whole country, in which land area agriculture has only 901.09 ha (accounting for 0.32% of the district's natural area), the rest is forestry land and other types of land. The whole district is located in a topographical area with an average altitude of 65 – 75 m above sea level, complicated terrain, dangerous terrain, many high mountains and many mountains. The valley is narrow and narrow. The hills are strongly divided by 3 main rivers, namely Ca, Nam Non and Nam Mo rivers. Traffic is difficult. Climate and weather extreme. Natural resources are quite rich and diverse but the reserves are not large. 97% of the area is hilly and mountainous, the rest are narrow ranges of land along the river.

=== Population ===
Tuong Duong has a total population of 75,993 people, including 6 main ethnic groups: Thai: 54,815 people; Butt: 3,083 people; Taypoong: 549 people; Odu: 604 people; Kinh: 7,805 people; Kho Mu: 8,979 people; other ethnic groups: 158 people (2006 data will be updated after the 2009 Population and Housing Census).

The population is unevenly distributed, mainly concentrated along National Highway 7A, especially in Hoa Binh town. The average population density is 30 people/km^{2}. The intellectual level is not high. The district has a young population structure. Labor resources are abundant but are mainly unskilled workers, workers with little technical and skilled skills. The main occupation is agricultural production, productivity is not high, application of science and technology to production is still limited. Outdated customs and habits still exist in remote and remote communes and some communes in the upper regions.

== Climate ==
Climate data for Tương Dương
Month	Jan	Feb	Mar	Apr	May	Jun	Jul	Aug	Sep	Oct	Nov	Dec	Year
Record high °C (°F)	36.7 (98.1)	39.0 (102.2)	41.6 (106.9)	44.0 (111.2)	44.2 (111.6)	41.5 (106.7)	41.3 (106.3)	40.0 (104.0)	39.0 (102.2)	38.2 (100.8)	37.2 (99.0)	36.0 (96.8)	44.2 (111.6)
Mean daily maximum °C (°F)	23.1 (73.6)	24.6 (76.3)	28.2 (82.8)	32.4 (90.3)	34.5 (94.1)	34.7 (94.5)	34.6 (94.3)	33.6 (92.5)	32.0 (89.6)	29.5 (85.1)	26.7 (80.1)	23.9 (75.0)	29.8 (85.6)
Daily mean °C (°F)	18.0 (64.4)	19.4 (66.9)	22.2 (72.0)	25.6 (78.1)	27.6 (81.7)	28.3 (82.9)	28.2 (82.8)	27.5 (81.5)	26.5 (79.7)	24.4 (75.9)	21.4 (70.5)	18.4 (65.1)	24.0 (75.2)
Mean daily minimum °C (°F)	15.0 (59.0)	16.4 (61.5)	18.7 (65.7)	21.6 (70.9)	23.4 (74.1)	24.4 (75.9)	24.3 (75.7)	24.1 (75.4)	23.5 (74.3)	21.6 (70.9)	18.5 (65.3)	15.4 (59.7)	20.6 (69.1)
Record low °C (°F)	1.7 (35.1)	5.0 (41.0)	4.2 (39.6)	11.1 (52.0)	17.6 (63.7)	18.5 (65.3)	21.0 (69.8)	21.4 (70.5)	16.9 (62.4)	11.9 (53.4)	7.5 (45.5)	2.8 (37.0)	1.7 (35.1)
Average precipitation mm (inches)	13.5 (0.53)	14.6 (0.57)	36.7 (1.44)	81.4 (3.20)	151.0 (5.94)	148.2 (5.83)	164.9 (6.49)	233.9 (9.21)	241.2 (9.50)	154.8 (6.09)	33.3 (1.31)	11.7 (0.46)	1,285 (50.59)
Average rainy days	4.6	4.2	6.8	11.6	15.3	14.6	15.2	19.2	16.0	12.8	8.1	4.8	133.2
Average relative humidity (%)	81.9	80.8	79.7	78.8	78.7	79.8	80.3	83.9	84.8	85.7	85.0	83.3	81.9
Mean monthly sunshine hours	92.7	82.0	113.8	150.6	189.4	163.4	171.7	158.3	154.4	138.1	116.5	108.2	1,626
Source: Vietnam Institute for Building Science and Technology
