= Con Cuông =

Con Cuông Xã Con Cuông
- Commune
- Con Cuông commune
- Location within Vietnam
- Coordinates: 19°03′08″N 104°52′35″E
- Country: Vietnam
- Region: North Central Coast
- Province: Nghệ An
- Time zone: UTC+7 (UTC + 7)

Con Cuông is a commune (xã) of Nghệ An Province, Vietnam.
