= Tân Kỳ district =

Coordinates: 19.167°N 104.250°E

Tan Kỳ district Huyện Tân Kỳ
- District
- Interactive map of Tan Kỳ district
- Country: Vietnam
- Region: North Central Coast
- Province: Nghệ An
- Capital: Tân Kỳ

Area
  - Total: 280 sq mi (726 km^{2})

Population (2003)
  - Total: 132,531
- Time zone: UTC+07:00 (Indochina Time)

Tân Kỳ is a former rural district in Nghệ An Province. As of 2003, the district had a population of 132,531. The district covers an area of 726 km^{2} (280 sq mi). The district capital lies at Tân Kỳ. The most famous place in Tân Kỳ is the big circle on the Hồ Chi Minh trail.
