= Thạch Hà district =

Coordinates: 18.388°N 105.890°E

Thạch Hà district Huyện Thạch Hà
- District
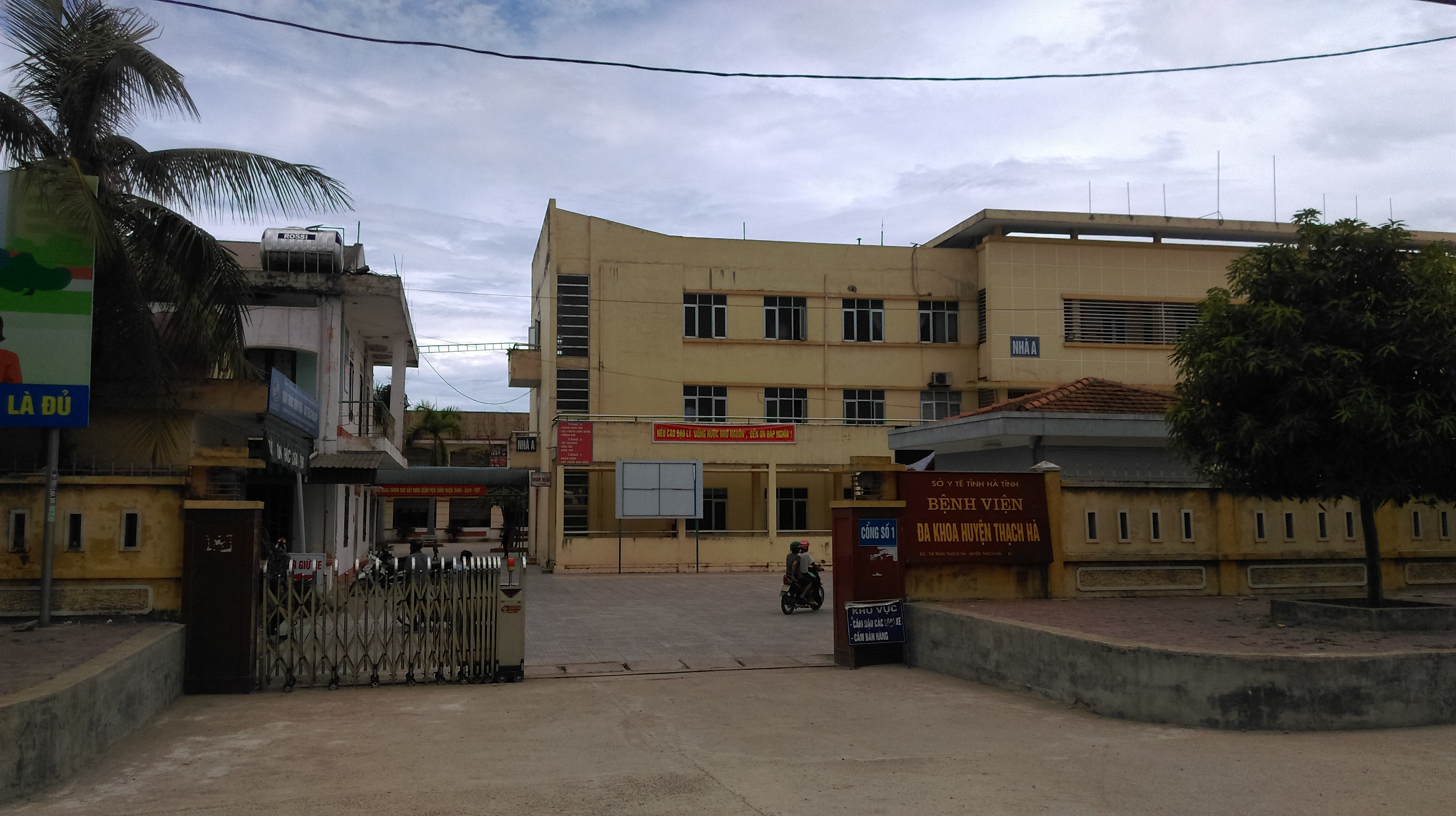
- Thạch Hà general hospital

- Seal
- Interactive map of Thạch Hà district
- Country: Vietnam
- Region: North Central Coast
- Province: Hà Tĩnh
- Capital: Thạch Hà

Area
  - Total: 154 sq mi (399 km^{2})

Population (2003)
  - Total: 182,120
- Time zone: UTC+07:00 (Indochina Time)

Thạch Hà is a former rural district of Hà Tĩnh province in the North Central Coast region of Vietnam. As of 2003 the district had a population of 182,120. The district covers an area of 399 km^{2} (154 sq mi). The district capital lies at Thạch Hà.
