= Yên Thành district =

Coordinates: 19.000°N 105.417°E

Yên Thành district Huyện Yên Thành
- District
- Seal
- Interactive map of Yên Thành district
- Country: Vietnam
- Region: North Central Coast
- Province: Nghệ An
- Capital: Yên Thành

Area
  - Total: 212.3179 sq mi (549.9008 km^{2})

Population (2019)
  - Total: 302,500
  - Density: 1,270/sq mi (489/km^{2})
- Time zone: UTC+07:00 (Indochina Time)
- Postal code: 466203
- Website: http://nguoiyenthanh.com

Yên Thành is a former rural district of Nghệ An province, in the North Central Coast region of Vietnam. As of 2019, the district had a population of 302,500. The district covers an area of 549 km^{2} (212 sq mi). The district capital lies at Yên Thành.

== Geography ==
Yên Thành has both mountains and plains. It is bordered by Tân Kỳ, Quỳnh Lưu and Diễn Châu districts to the north, Diễn Châu District to the east, Nghi Lộc District to the southeast, Đô Lương District to the south, and Tân Kỳ District to the west.

== The administrative unit ==
Yên Thành district has 39 administrative units, including Yên Thành commune:

- Bắc Thành
- Bảo Thành
- Công Thành
- Đại Thành
- Đô Thành
- Đồng Thành
- Đức Thành
- Hậu Thành
- Hoa Thành
- Hồng Thành
- Hợp Thành
- Hùng Thành
- Khánh Thành
- Kim Thành
- Lăng Thành
- Liên Thành
- Long Thành
- Lý Thành
- Mã Thành
- Minh Thành
- Mỹ Thành
- Nam Thành
- Nhân Thành
- Phúc Thành
- Phú Thành
- Quang Thành
- Sơn Thành
- Tân Thành
- Tăng Thành
- Tây Thành
- Thịnh Thành
- Thọ Thành
- Tiến Thành
- Trung Thành
- Văn Thành
- Viên Thành
- Vĩnh Thành
- Xuân Thành

== Transportation ==
Highway 7A: 18 km from Vinh Thanh My Thanh commune to Provincial Road 534 (Highway 7A connected to National Highway 1A ): 14 km from the town of Yen Thanh Son Thanh Provincial Road 538 (Highway 7A connected with National Highway 1A): 15 km from commune to commune Hop Thanh Cong Thanh.
