= Quỳ Hợp district =

Coordinates: 19.333°N 105.167°E

Quỳ Hợp District Huyện Quỳ Hợp
- District
- Seal
- Interactive map of Quỳ Hợp District
- Country: Vietnam
- Region: North Central Coast
- Province: Nghệ An
- Capital: Quỳ Hợp

Area
  - Total: 364 sq mi (942 km^{2})

Population (2003)
  - Total: 119,960
- Time zone: UTC+07:00 (Indochina Time)

Quỳ Hợp is a former rural district of Nghệ An province in the North Central Coast region of Vietnam. As of 2003, the district had a population of 119,960. The district covers an area of 942 km^{2} (364 sq mi). The district capital lies at Quỳ Hợp.

== Climate ==
Climate data for Quỳ Hợp
| Month | Jan | Feb | Mar | Apr | May | Jun | Jul | Aug | Sep | Oct | Nov | Dec | Year |
|---|---|---|---|---|---|---|---|---|---|---|---|---|---|
| Record high °C (°F) | 35.2 (95.4) | 37.2 (99.0) | 40.1 (104.2) | 42.4 (108.3) | 43.4 (110.1) | 43.0 (109.4) | 41.8 (107.2) | 40.3 (104.5) | 38.2 (100.8) | 36.8 (98.2) | 37.0 (98.6) | 33.3 (91.9) | 43.4 (110.1) |
| Mean daily maximum °C (°F) | 21.7 (71.1) | 22.9 (73.2) | 25.8 (78.4) | 30.6 (87.1) | 33.7 (92.7) | 34.3 (93.7) | 34.3 (93.7) | 33.1 (91.6) | 31.4 (88.5) | 29.1 (84.4) | 26.2 (79.2) | 23.1 (73.6) | 28.9 (84.0) |
| Daily mean °C (°F) | 17.3 (63.1) | 18.6 (65.5) | 21.1 (70.0) | 24.8 (76.6) | 27.6 (81.7) | 28.6 (83.5) | 28.6 (83.5) | 27.7 (81.9) | 26.5 (79.7) | 24.2 (75.6) | 21.2 (70.2) | 18.1 (64.6) | 23.7 (74.7) |
| Mean daily minimum °C (°F) | 14.7 (58.5) | 16.0 (60.8) | 18.4 (65.1) | 21.5 (70.7) | 23.8 (74.8) | 25.0 (77.0) | 25.0 (77.0) | 24.6 (76.3) | 23.5 (74.3) | 21.4 (70.5) | 18.1 (64.6) | 15.0 (59.0) | 20.6 (69.1) |
| Record low °C (°F) | −0.3 (31.5) | 5.0 (41.0) | 4.8 (40.6) | 12.2 (54.0) | 16.2 (61.2) | 19.9 (67.8) | 21.2 (70.2) | 21.3 (70.3) | 16.0 (60.8) | 10.8 (51.4) | 5.5 (41.9) | 0.9 (33.6) | −0.3 (31.5) |
| Average precipitation mm (inches) | 22.2 (0.87) | 19.5 (0.77) | 34.1 (1.34) | 71.4 (2.81) | 200.9 (7.91) | 194.1 (7.64) | 183.2 (7.21) | 279.9 (11.02) | 297.1 (11.70) | 226.9 (8.93) | 47.6 (1.87) | 18.9 (0.74) | 1,603.3 (63.12) |
| Average rainy days | 9.7 | 10.0 | 11.7 | 11.4 | 14.9 | 11.8 | 13.0 | 17.2 | 14.9 | 12.9 | 7.7 | 6.0 | 140.8 |
| Average relative humidity (%) | 85.8 | 86.3 | 85.8 | 83.3 | 80.6 | 80.1 | 80.0 | 84.9 | 86.5 | 85.2 | 84.2 | 83.6 | 83.8 |
| Mean monthly sunshine hours | 71.6 | 61.6 | 93.9 | 131.2 | 196.9 | 174.2 | 190.4 | 164.2 | 151.1 | 136.7 | 113.9 | 97.8 | 1,582.2 |
Source: Vietnam Institute for Building Science and Technology
