= Quế Phong district =

Coordinates: 19.667°N 104.917°E

Quế Phong District Huyện Quế Phong
- District
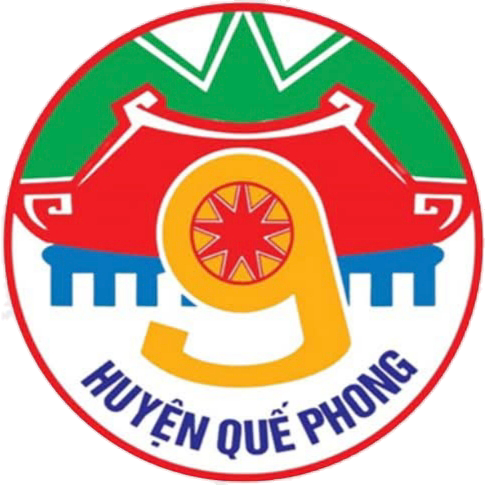
- Seal
- Interactive map of Quế Phong District
- Country: Vietnam
- Region: North Central Coast
- Province: Nghệ An
- Capital: Kim Sơn

Area
  - Total: 732 sq mi (1,895 km^{2})

Population (2003)
  - Total: 60,317
- Time zone: UTC+07:00 (Indochina Time)

Quế Phong is a former rural district of Nghệ An province in the North Central Coast region of Vietnam.

== Population ==
In 2003, the district had a population of 60,317. The district covers an area of 1,895 square kilometres (732 sq mi). The district capital is Kim Sơn.
