= Anh Sơn district =

Coordinates: 18.950°N 105.083°E

Anh Sơn District Huyện Anh Sơn
- District
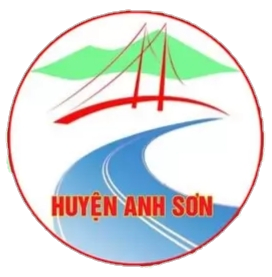
- Seal
- Interactive map of Anh Sơn District
- Country: Vietnam
- Region: North Central Coast
- Province: Nghệ An
- Capital: Anh Sơn

Area
  - Total: 231 sq mi (597 km^{2})

Population (2009)
  - Total: 132,060
- Time zone: UTC+07:00 (Indochina Time)

Anh Sơn is a former rural district of Nghệ An province in the North Central Coast region of Vietnam. As of 2009 the district had a population of 132,060. The district covers an area of 597 km^{2}. The district capital lies at Anh Sơn.
