= Nghệ An province =

Province of Vietnam

Nghệ An
- Province
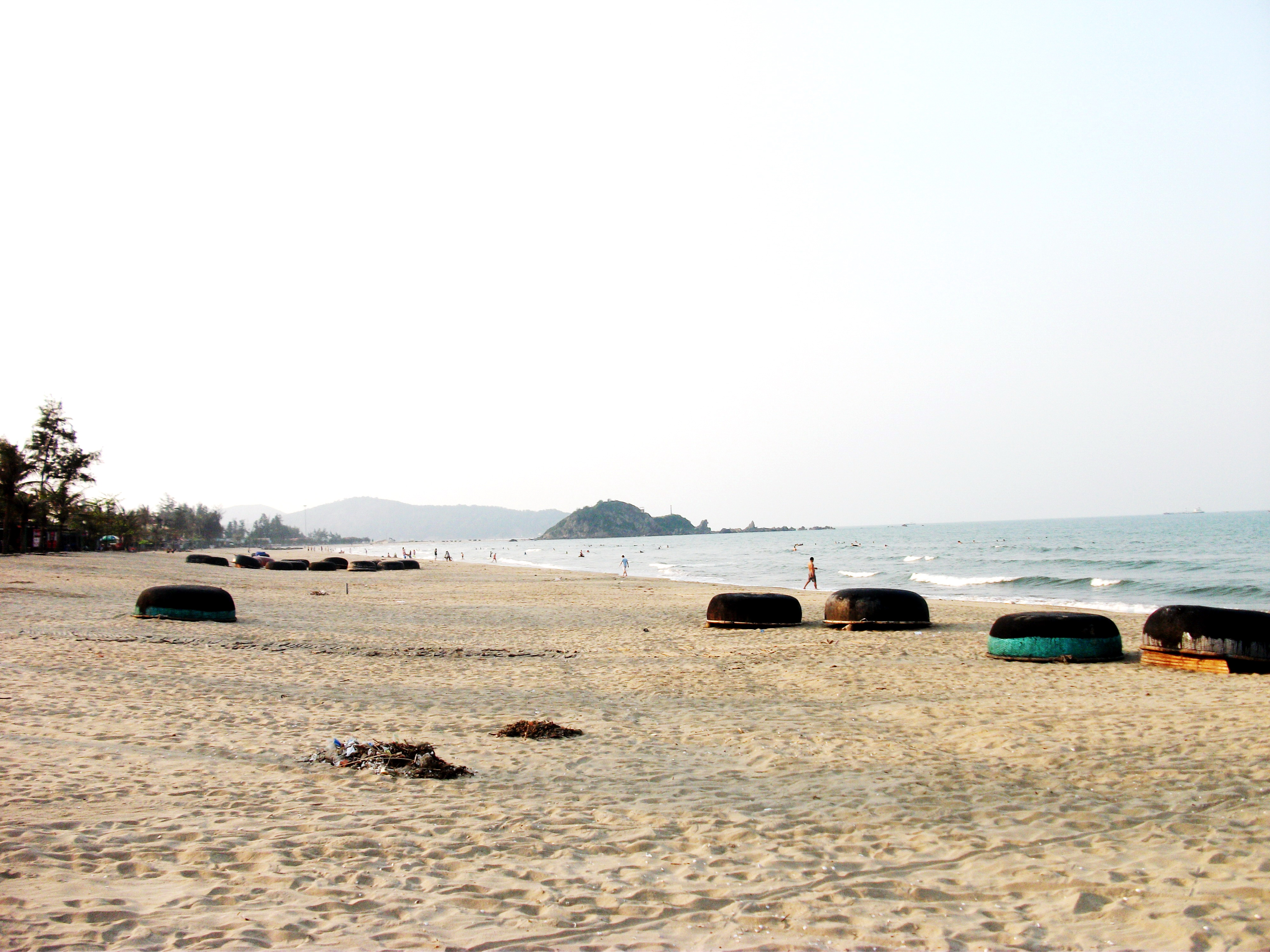
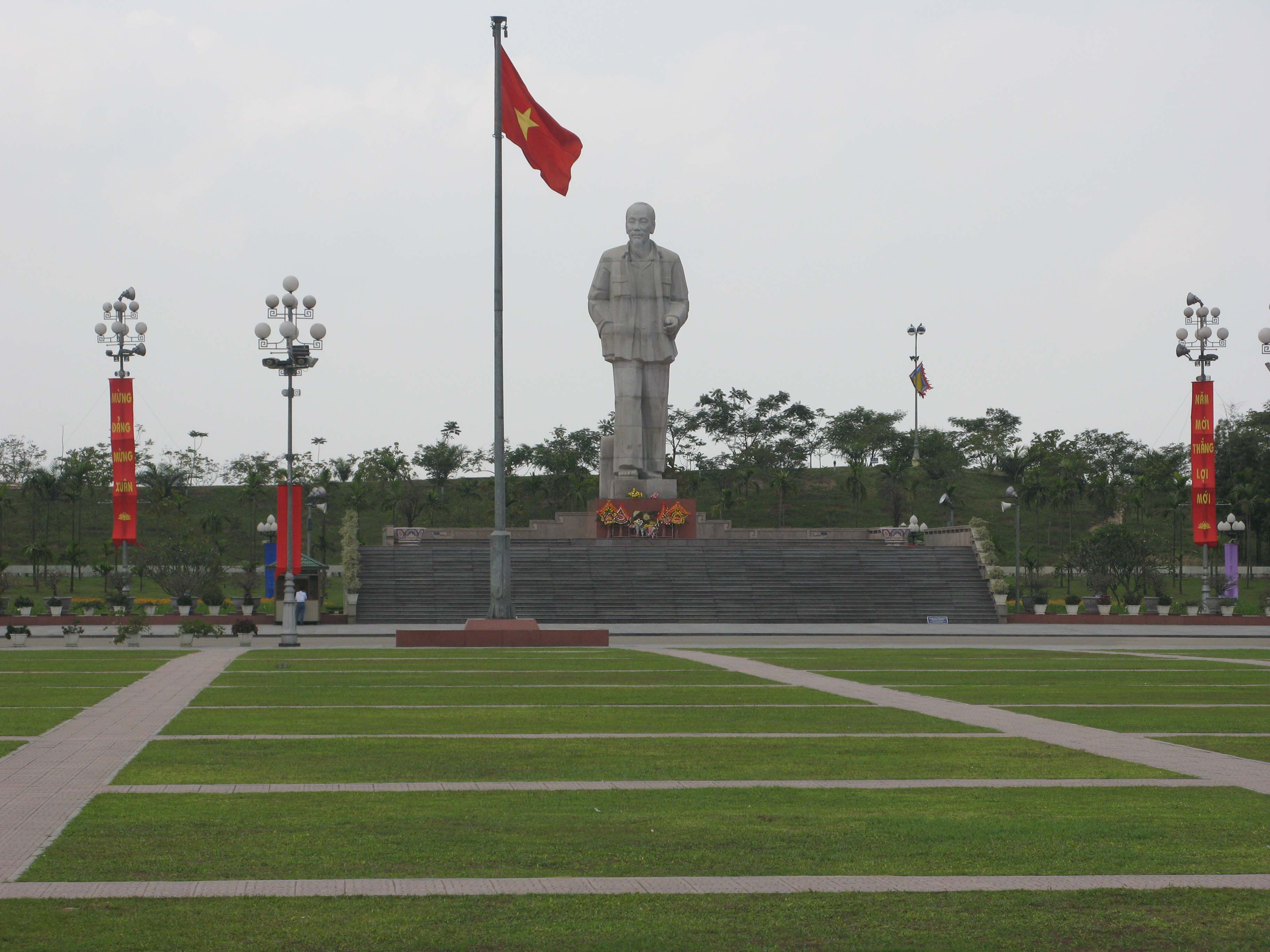
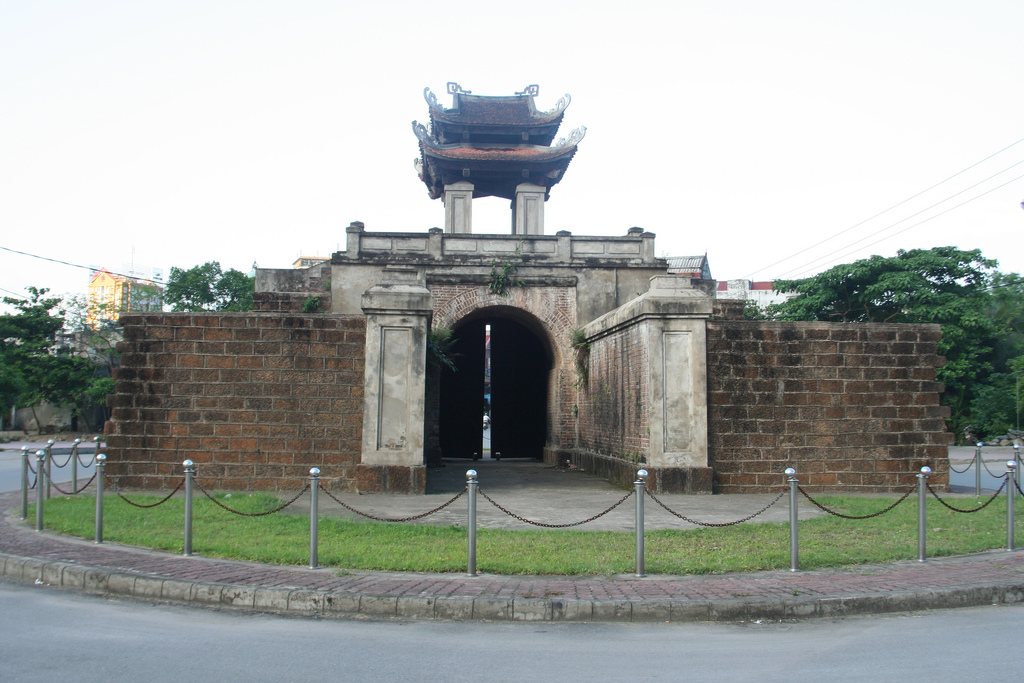
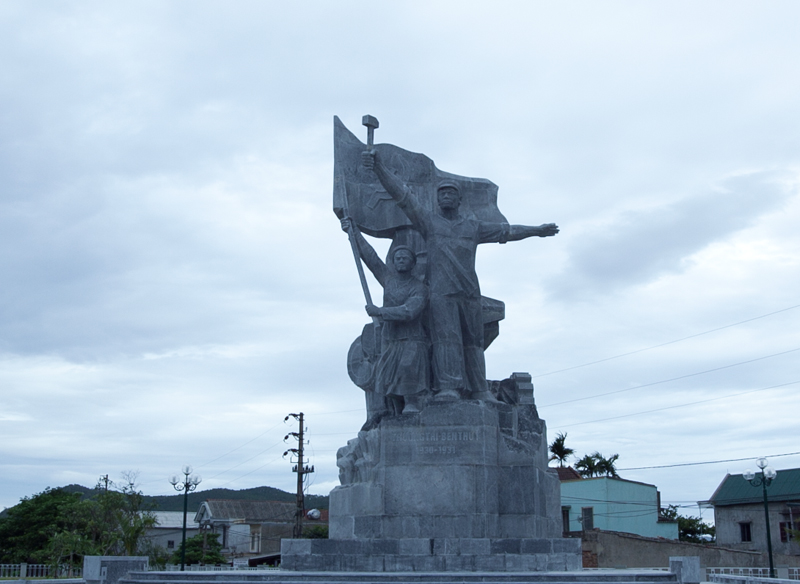
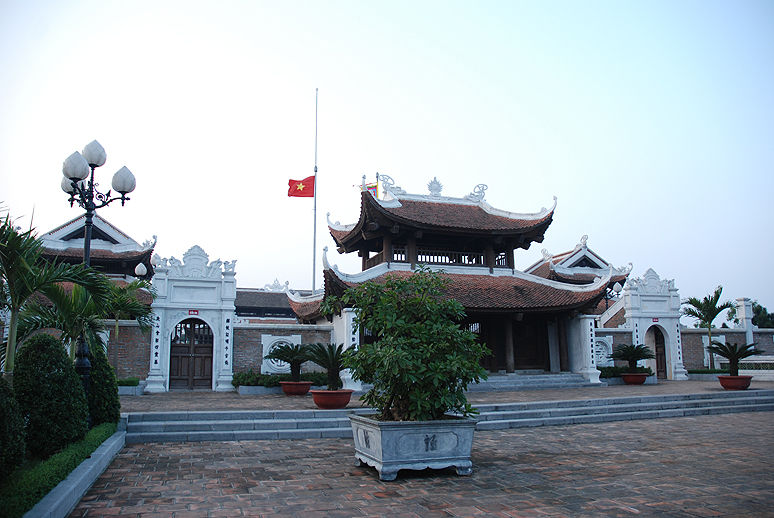
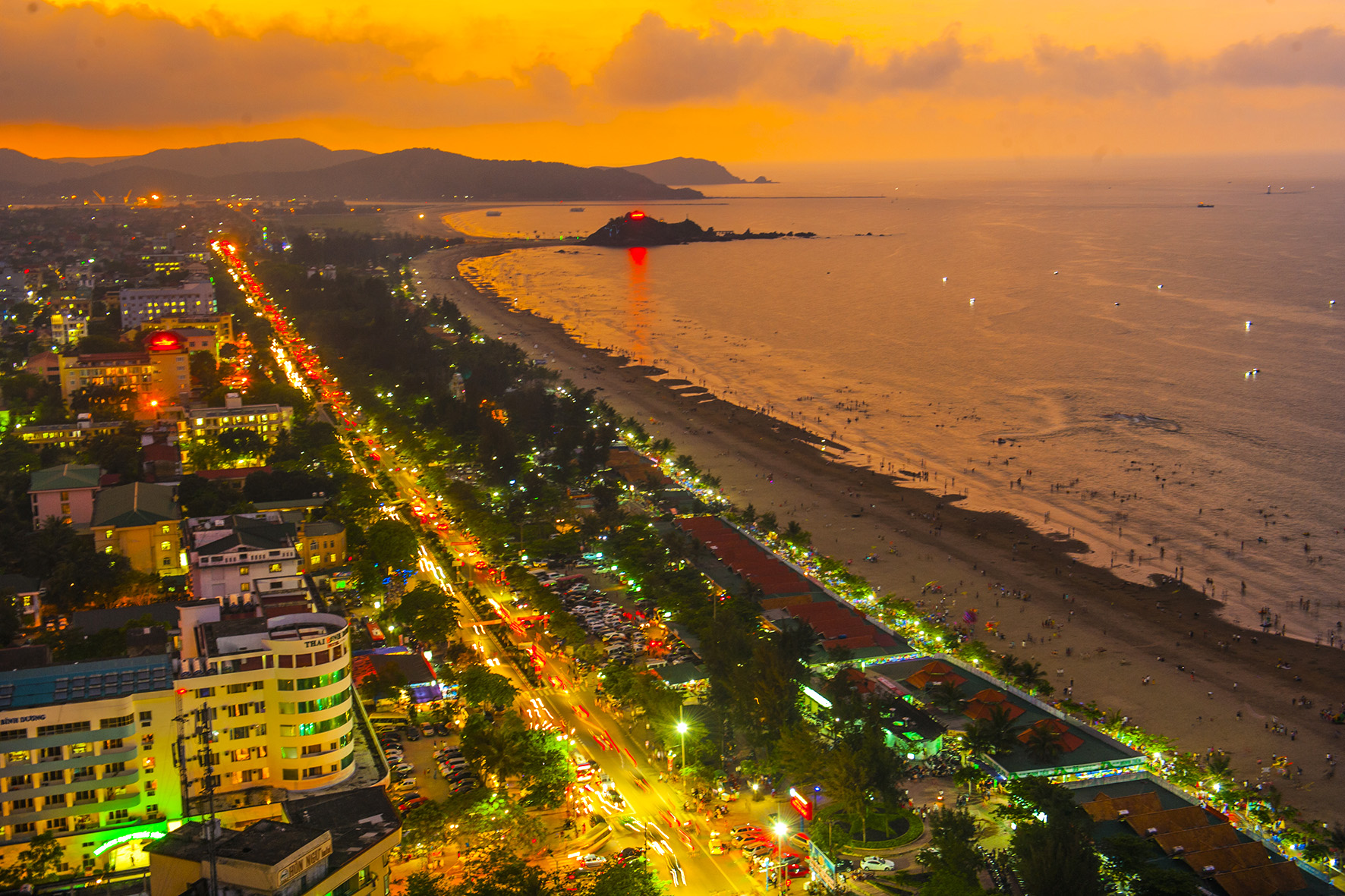
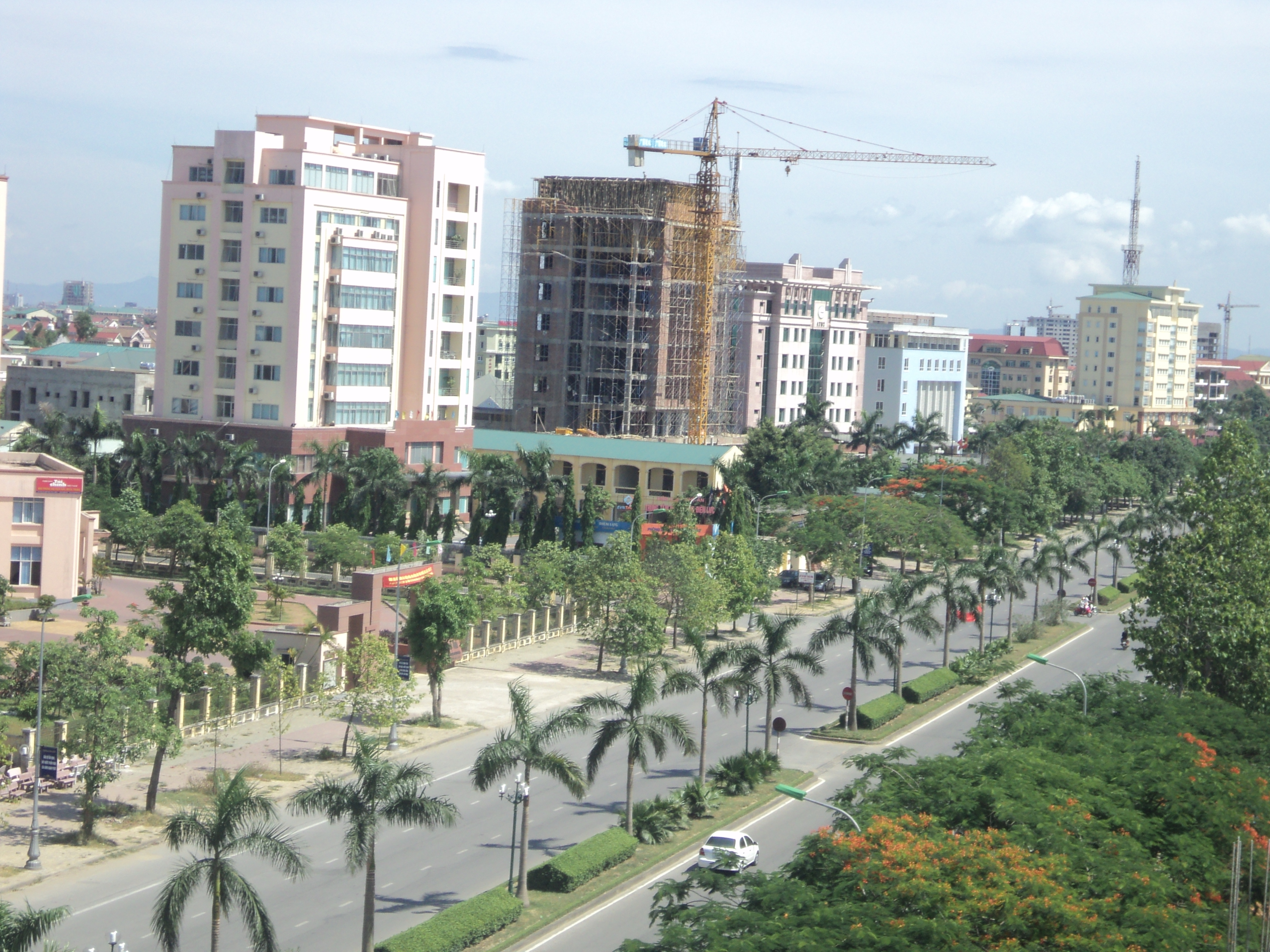
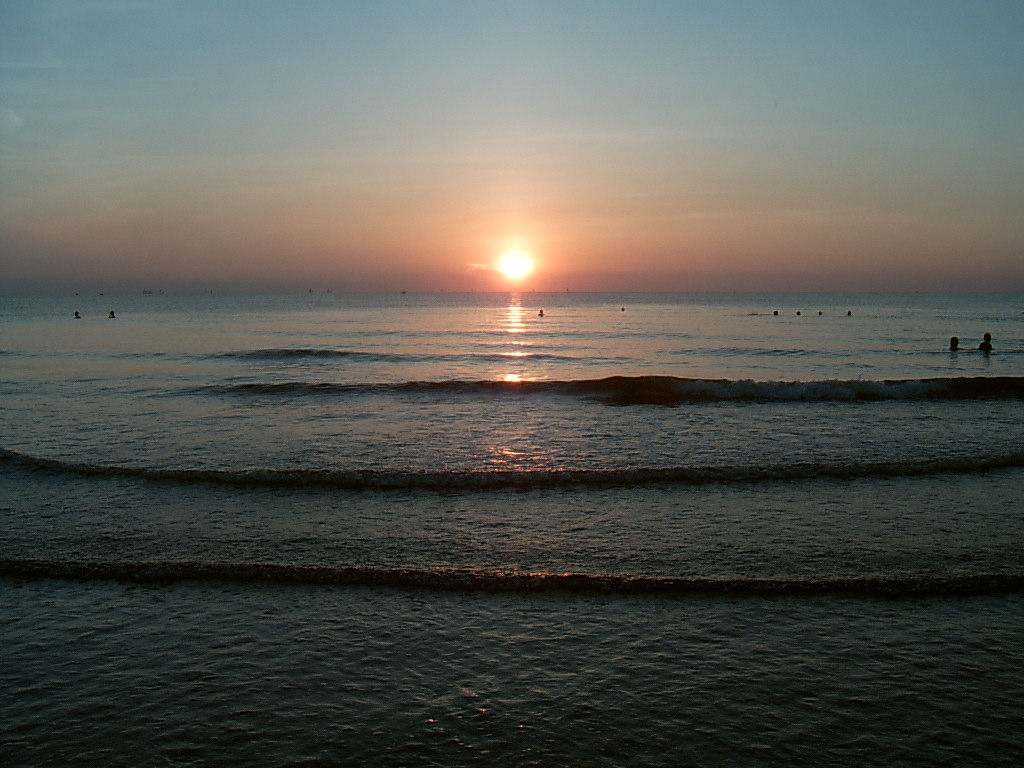
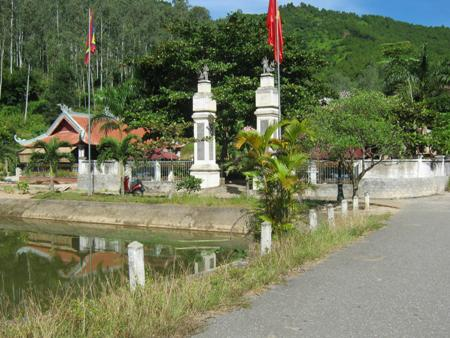
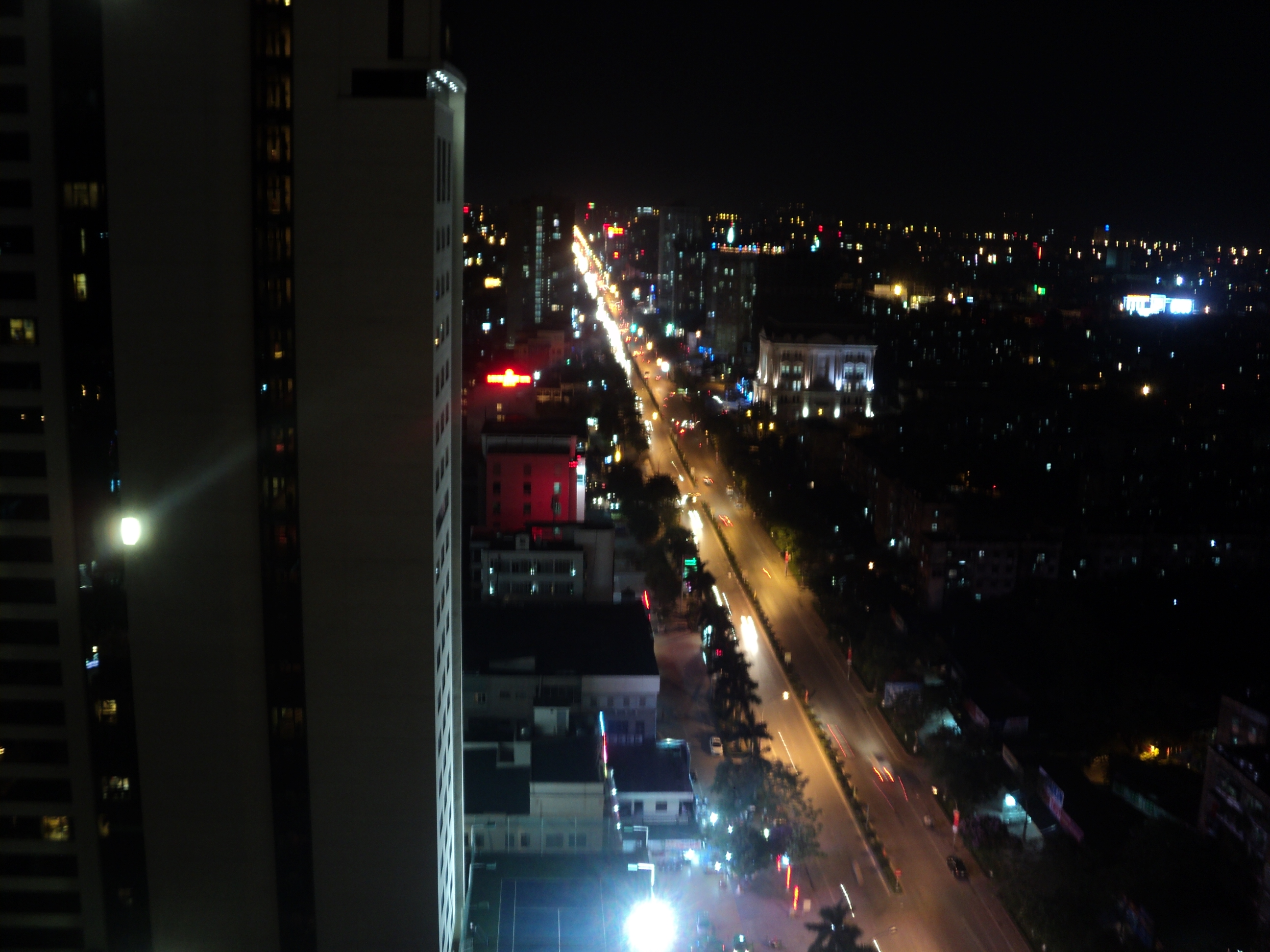
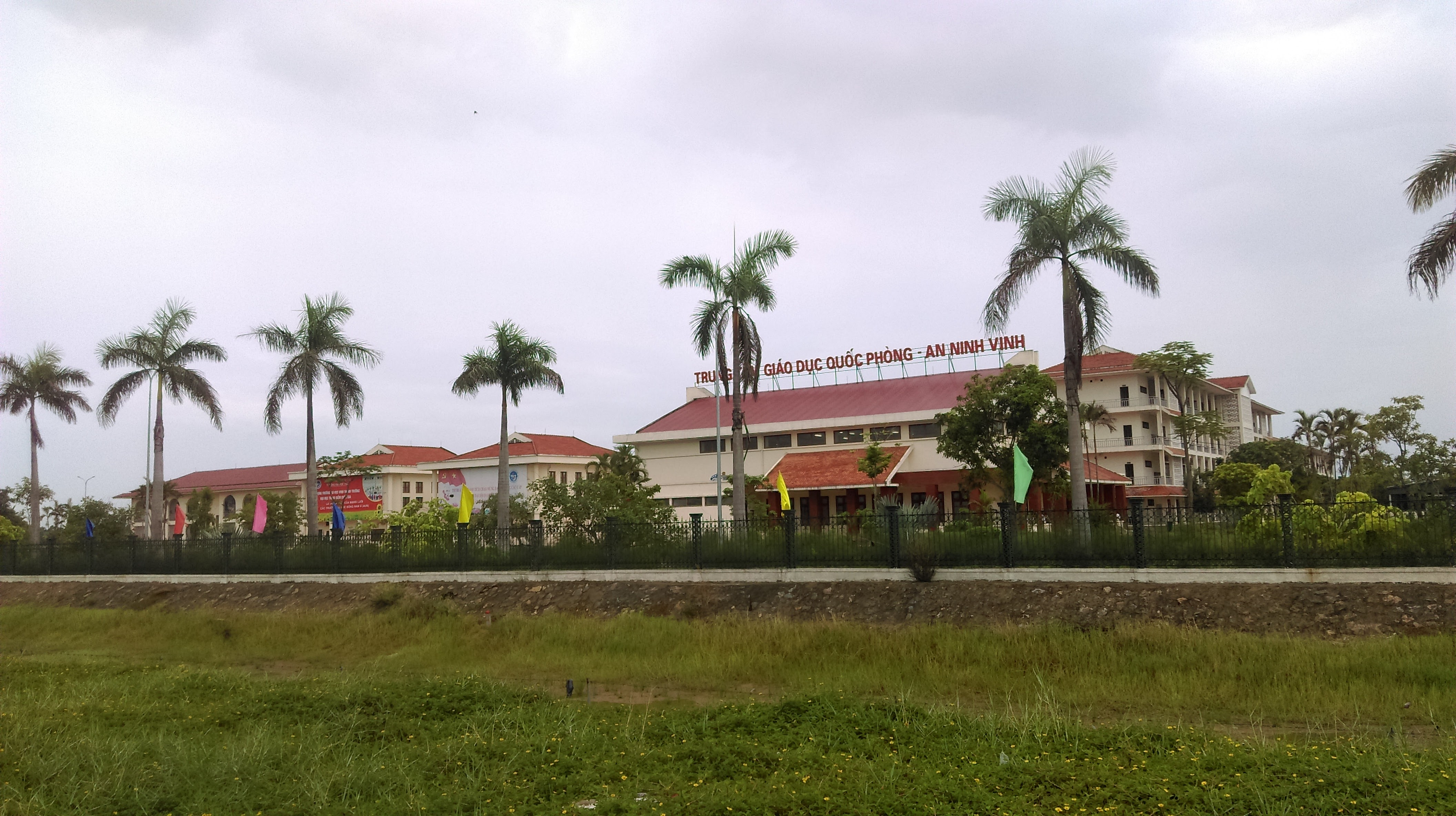
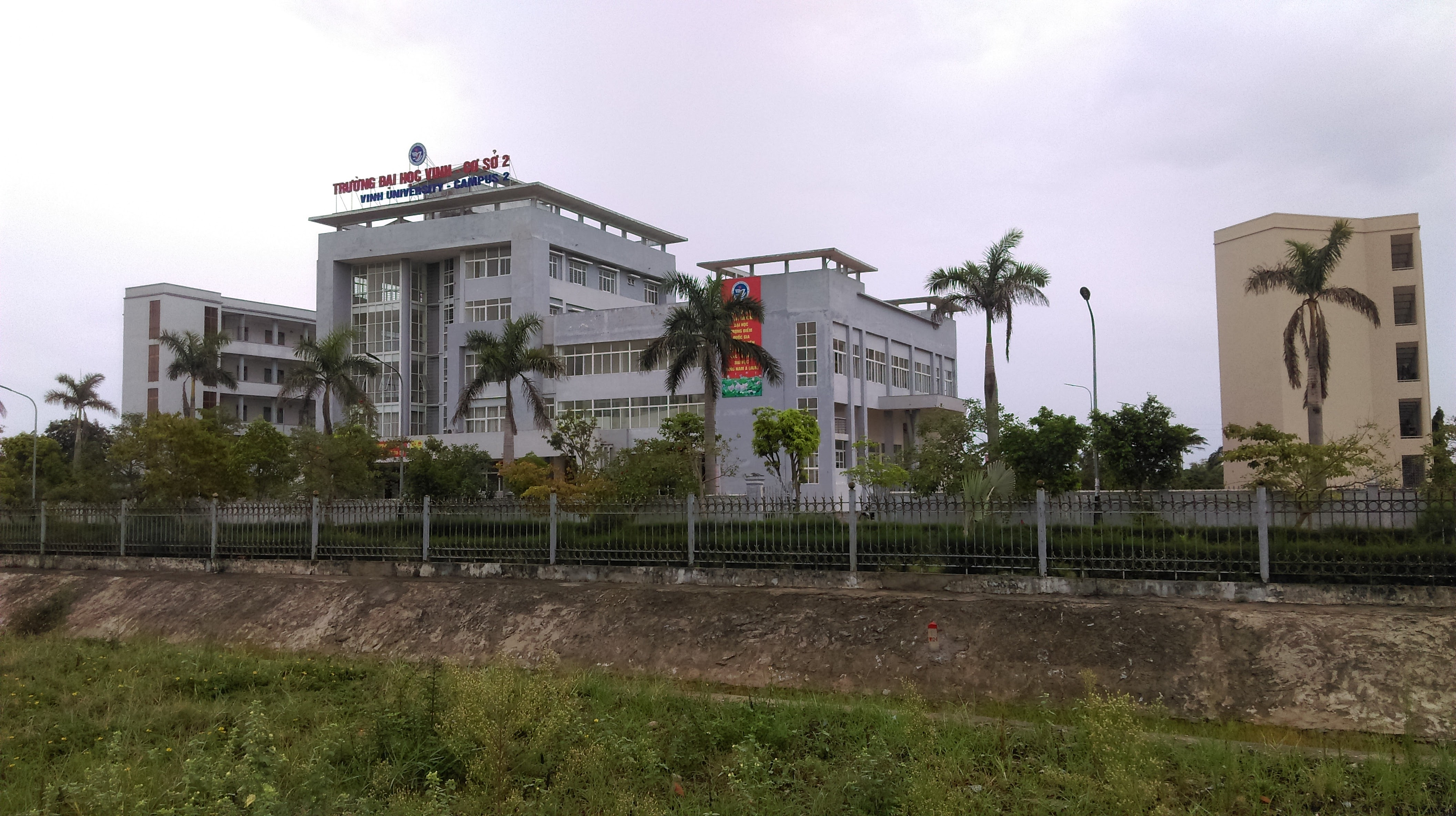
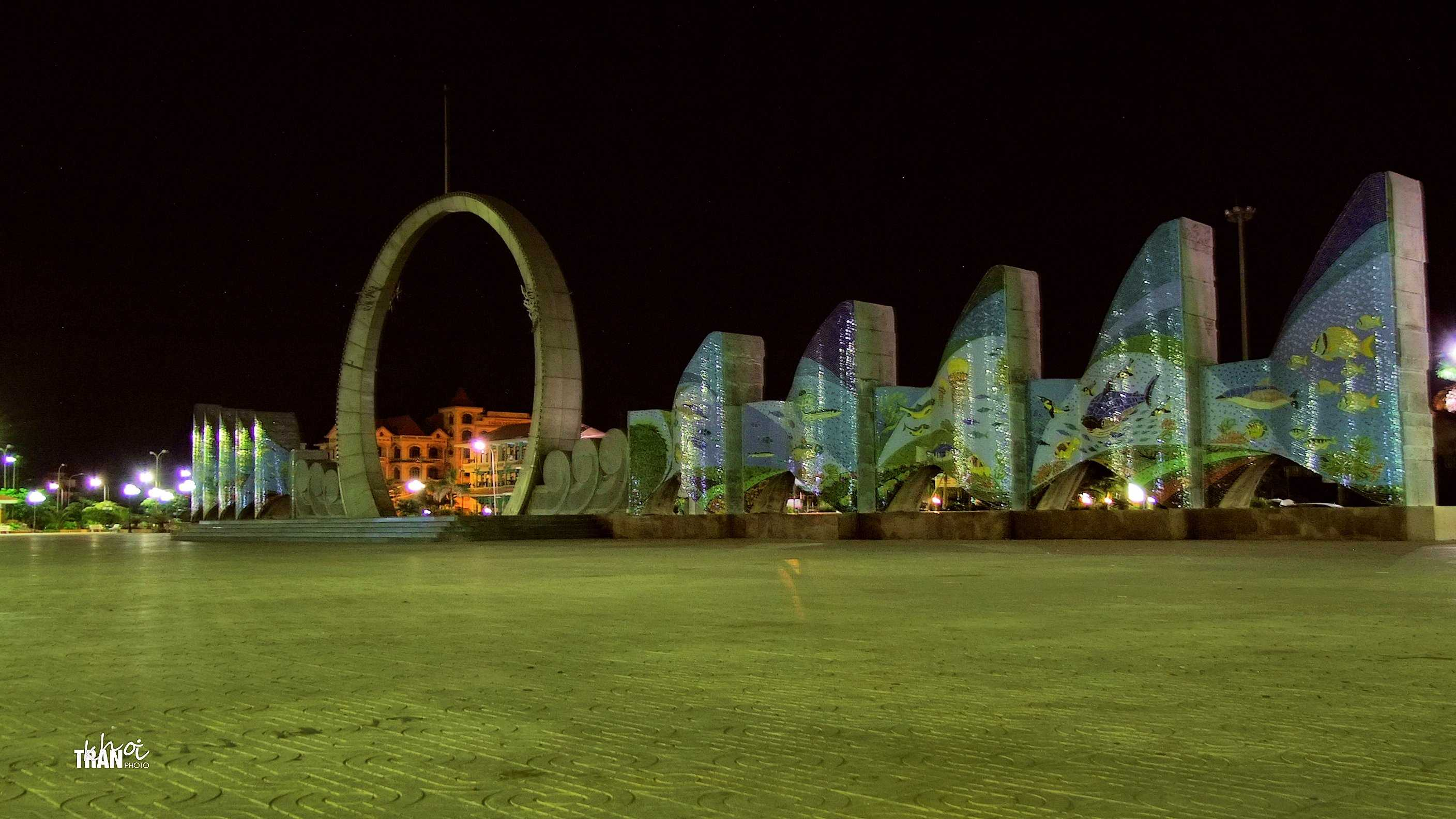
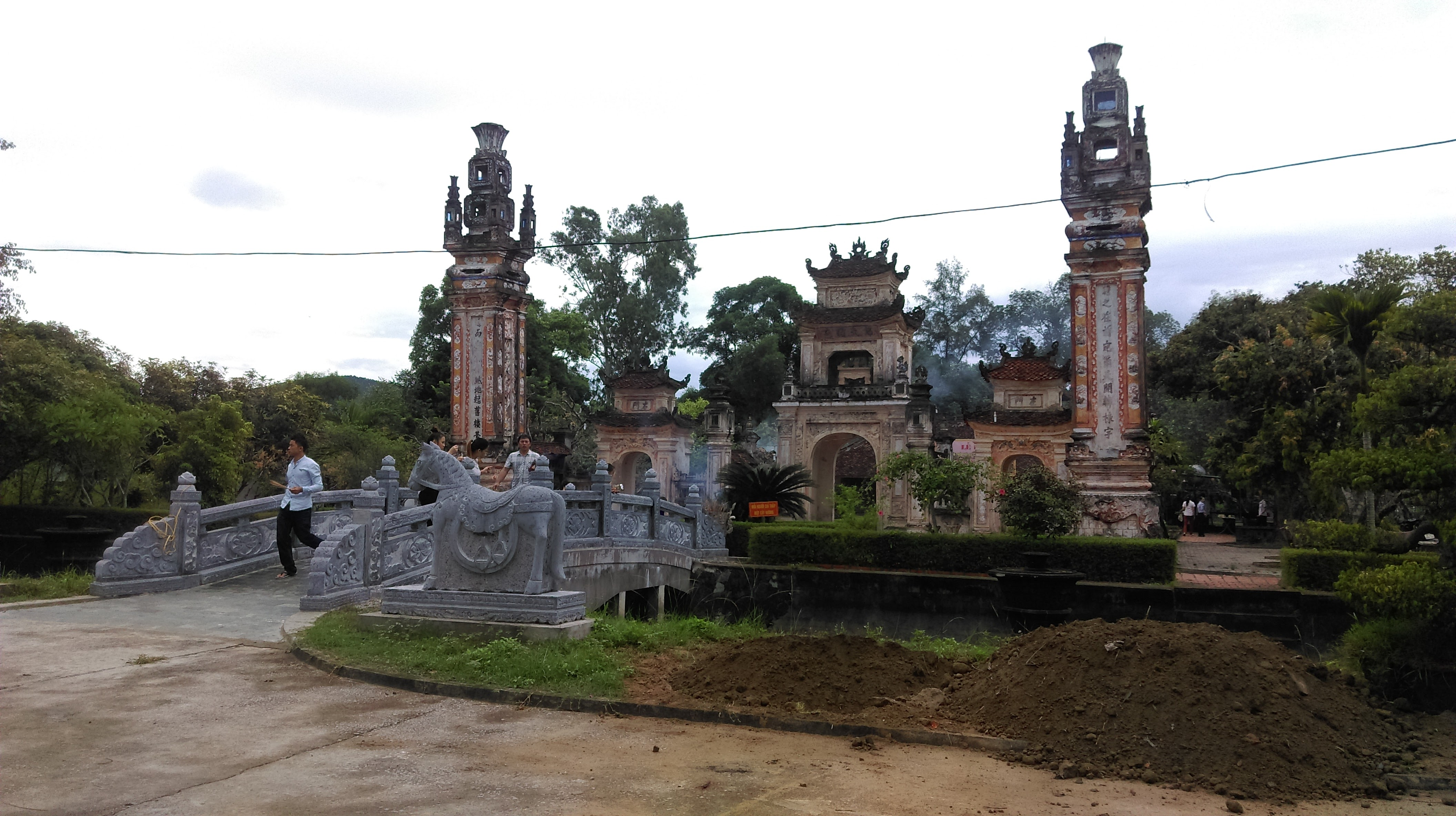
- Beach of Cửa Lò • Hồ Chí Minh Town square • Monument workers, farmers, soldiers • Quang Trung Temple • Lenin Avenue in Vinh City • Sun rise at Cửa Lò • Mai Hắc Đế Temple • A street in Vinh by night • Department of Defense in Vinh • University Vinh • Vinh City Town square • Nguyễn Xí Temple

- Seal

- Location of Nghệ An within Vietnam
- Interactive map of Nghệ An
- Coordinates: 19°20′N 104°50′E
- Country: Vietnam
- Region: North Central Coast
- Capital: Vinh

Government
  - People's Council Chair: Thái Thanh Quý
  - People's Committee Chair: Nguyễn Đức Trung

Area
  - Total: 16,486.49 km^{2} (6,365.47 sq mi)

Population (2025)
  - Total: 4,831,694
  - Density: 293.0699/km^{2} (759.0476/sq mi)

Demographics
  - Ethnicities: Vietnamese, Khơ Mú, Thai, Thổ, Mường, H'Mông

GDP
  - Total: VND 115.676 trillion US$ 5.024 billion
- Time zone: UTC+7 (ICT)
- Area codes: 238
- ISO 3166 code: VN-22
- HDI (2020): ▲0.711 (30th)
- Website: nghean.gov.vn

Nghệ An (Vietnamese pronunciation: [ŋêˀ ān]) is a coastal province near the northernmost part of the North Central Coast region, Central Vietnam. It borders Thanh Hóa to the north, Hà Tĩnh to the south, Xiangkhouang, Bolikhamsai and Houaphan of Laos to the west, and the South China Sea (Gulf of Tonkin) to the east.

Nghệ An is Vietnam's largest province by area. It is located on the east–west economic corridor connecting Myanmar, Thailand, Laos and Vietnam along National Route 7 to the port of Cửa Lò.

Nghệ An has one city, three towns and 17 districts. Vinh is the capital of Nghệ An and the economic and cultural center of the province and of the whole North Central Coast. It was the homeland of Ho Chi Minh, the first president of Vietnam.

== History ==
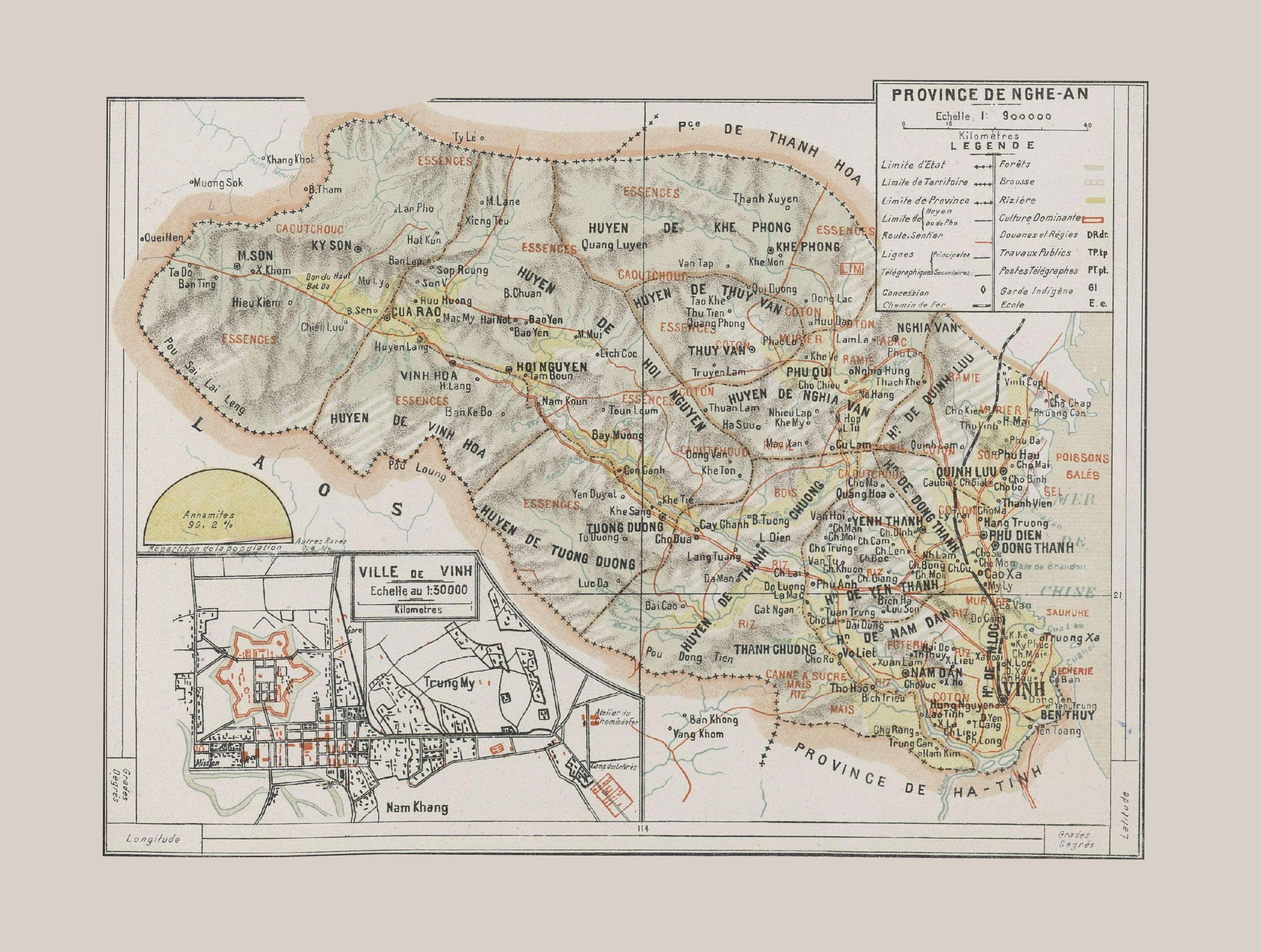
Map of Nghe An province in 1909

Nghệ An and Thanh Hoá were the bases of the Lê dynasty against the Mạc dynasty in the 1530s.

== Administrative divisions ==
Nghệ An is subdivided into 21 district-level sub-divisions:

- 1 provincial city: Vinh (capital)
- 3 district-level towns: Cửa Lò, Thái Hòa, Hoàng Mai
- 17 districts: Anh Sơn, Con Cuông, Diễn Châu, Đô Lương, Hưng Nguyên, Kỳ Sơn, Nam Đàn, Nghi Lộc, Nghĩa Đàn, Quế Phong, Quỳ Châu, Quỳ Hợp, Quỳnh Lưu, Tân Kỳ, Thanh Chương, Tương Dương, Yên Thành

They are further subdivided into 17 commune-level towns (or townlets), 431 communes, and 32 wards.

== Economy ==
Nghệ An is one of the few localities where the Politburo issued a separate resolution on economic and social development, namely Resolution 26. Nghệ An is known as a province with great industrial potential in Vietnam, producing cement, sugar, milk, white stones and many other products.

The major industrial zones of the province are Vietnam Singapore Industrial Park or VSIP (15 km^{2}), Hemaraj (30 km^{2}), Nam Cam (4 km^{2}) and Dong Hoi.

=== Tourism ===
- Cửa Lò beach is one of the most ideal beaches and resort in Viet Nam with 10 km long sandy beach, fine sand, clean water, organized by the World Environment Organization and Vietnam National Authority of Tourism as one of the two clean and safe beaches in Vietnam. To the north, close to Cua Lo Lan Chau Island, wherein 1936, King Bao Dai built the resort castle. The southeastern town is Ngư Island, offshore is Mount Quynh Nhai 218m high compared to the sea with two islands connecting each other look like the eyes so folk called Island Eye or Hon Mat. Cua Lo is beautiful in the blue sky and beautiful with many memories of the cultural tradition of the Nghe.
- Pù Mát National Park is about 120 km south-west of Vinh City, Nghệ An province. This is a large forest area in North Central Vietnam and is also a biosphere reserve in the world. With beautiful natural landscape, Pu Mat is an attractive ecological tourist destination that attracts domestic and foreign tourists. Pu Mat National Park has an area of 194,000 ha of natural forest, of which the core area is 94,000 ha and the buffer zone is 100,000 ha. Pu Mat peak is 1,840 meters, covered with cloud cover. Pu Mat is one of the largest biological reserves in Vietnam with over 2,400 plant species, of which 37 species are listed in the Vietnam Red Book and 20 species in the Red List.
- Con Cuong: Model homestay tourism has been growing in Nghệ An. Nua hamlet, Yen Khe commune, Con Cuong district, Nghe An is a place where any citizen wants to experience homestay space in the people's home. Activities such as self-weaving of brocade towel, cooking traditional dishes or transforming into a Thai ethnicity will be very interesting. Here visitors can visit Pu Mat National Park, Khe Kem Waterfall or Khe Bu, Khe Thoi, which are all interesting places of the forest.
- Muong Thanh Ecological Park: Total area is 300ha, Muong Thanh Dien Lam ecological area (in Dong Nong hamlet, Dien Lam commune, Dien Chau) 60 km from Vinh, 240 km from Hanoi. Along Highway 48, visitors will return to the ecology of Muong Thanh Dien Lam is quite convenient. This is a "long-term" project invested by Muong Thanh Hotel Group with the aim of making the place become the highlight of tourism, attracting many domestic and foreign tourists to Nghe An province. Started construction from 2014, up to now the ecological zone has opened the main items and welcome visitors to visit and relax. Coming to Muong Thanh ecological area, visitors will be able to visit the wildlife sanctuary with 60 animal species, including many rare species from Africa and South America such as white tigers, rhinoceros, antelopes and giraffes.
- Thanh Chuong Tea Island consists of dozens of small hills surrounded by Cau Cau dam that stretch across Thanh Thinh and Thanh An communes of Thanh Chuong district. The middle of the dam is the rolling hills that are grown by the tea planters like turtles that float on the water.
- Kim Liên Special National Relic (also known as the Kim Liên Historical Site) is located in Nam Đàn District, Nghệ An Province. The site comprises the birthplace and childhood residences associated with Hồ Chí Minh, along with related structures such as Sen Village, Hoàng Trù Village, memorial houses, temples, and exhibition spaces documenting aspects of his life and activities.

== Education ==
There are six universities in Nghệ An, all of them are in Vinh city, the capital of Nghệ An province. The biggest one is Vinh University.

== Ethnic groups ==
In addition to the majority Vietnamese people, the province is home to the Thổ people and Tai peoples such as the Red Tai, Tai Thanh and Tai Hang Tong. Some Ơ Đu people also live here.

== Notable people ==
- Ho Chi Minh (born 1890), revolutionary
- Nguyễn Hồng Giáp (born 1934), economist
- Phạm Phương Thảo (born 1982), singer, songwriter, and composer
- Phan Van Quy (born 1954), politician and organization founder
