= North Central Coast =

Region of Vietnam

Coordinates: 16°28′N 107°35′E

North Central Coast Bắc Trung Bộ
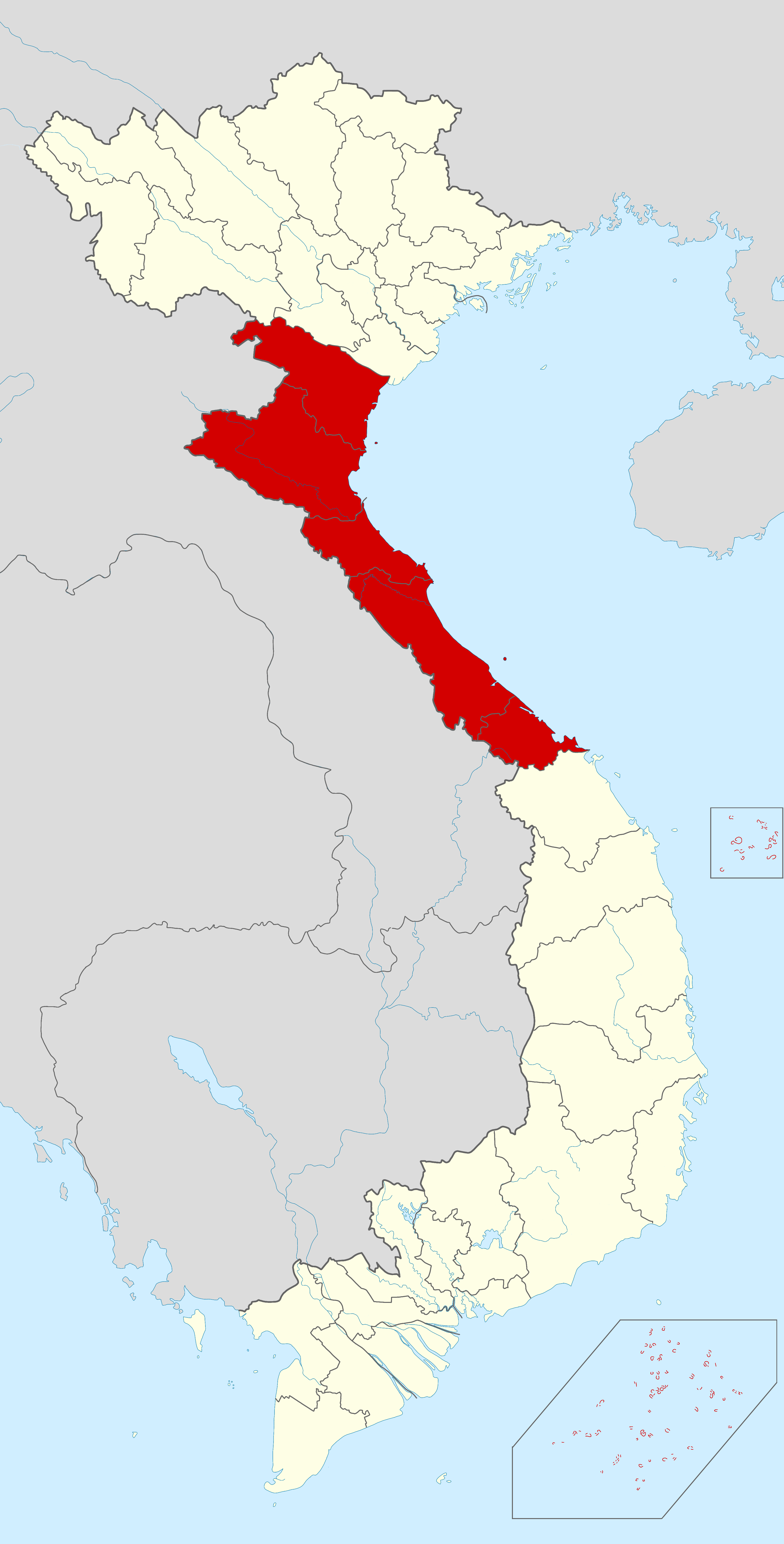
- Map showing location of the Bắc Trung Bộ (North Central Region) region in Vietnam
- Country: Vietnam

Area
  - Total: 51,242.75 km^{2} (19,784.94 sq mi)

Population (2022)
  - Total: 11,190,830
  - Density: 218.3886/km^{2} (565.6238/sq mi)

GDP
  - Total: VND 433 trillion US$ 19.3 billion (2021)
- Time zone: UTC+7 (UTC +7)
- HDI (2022): 0.711 high · 3rd

Bắc Trung Bộ (literally North Central Region, and often translated as North Central Coast) is one of the geographic regions of Vietnam. It consists of four province and a city in northern part of Central Vietnam: Thanh Hóa, Nghệ An, Hà Tĩnh, Quảng Trị, Huế. The last two provinces were the northernmost provinces of State of Vietnam and South Vietnam until Reunification of Vietnam in 1976. In the Nguyễn dynasty, this area (except Thừa Thiên) was known as Hữu Trực Kỳ (the area located in the left of Thừa Thiên).

== Provinces ==
Statistics of North Central Coastal Vietnam (Bắc Trung Bộ)
Province- Level Division	Capital	Population (2025)	Area (km^{2})
Hà Tĩnh	Hà Tĩnh	1,622,901	5,994.45
Nghệ An	Vinh	3,831,694	16,486.49
Quảng Bình	Đồng Hới	1.079,119	7,998.80
Quảng Trị	Đông Hà	791,726	4,701.20
Thanh Hóa	Thanh Hóa	4,324,783	11,114.71
Huế (municipality)	Thuận Hóa	1,432,986	4,947.11

== History ==
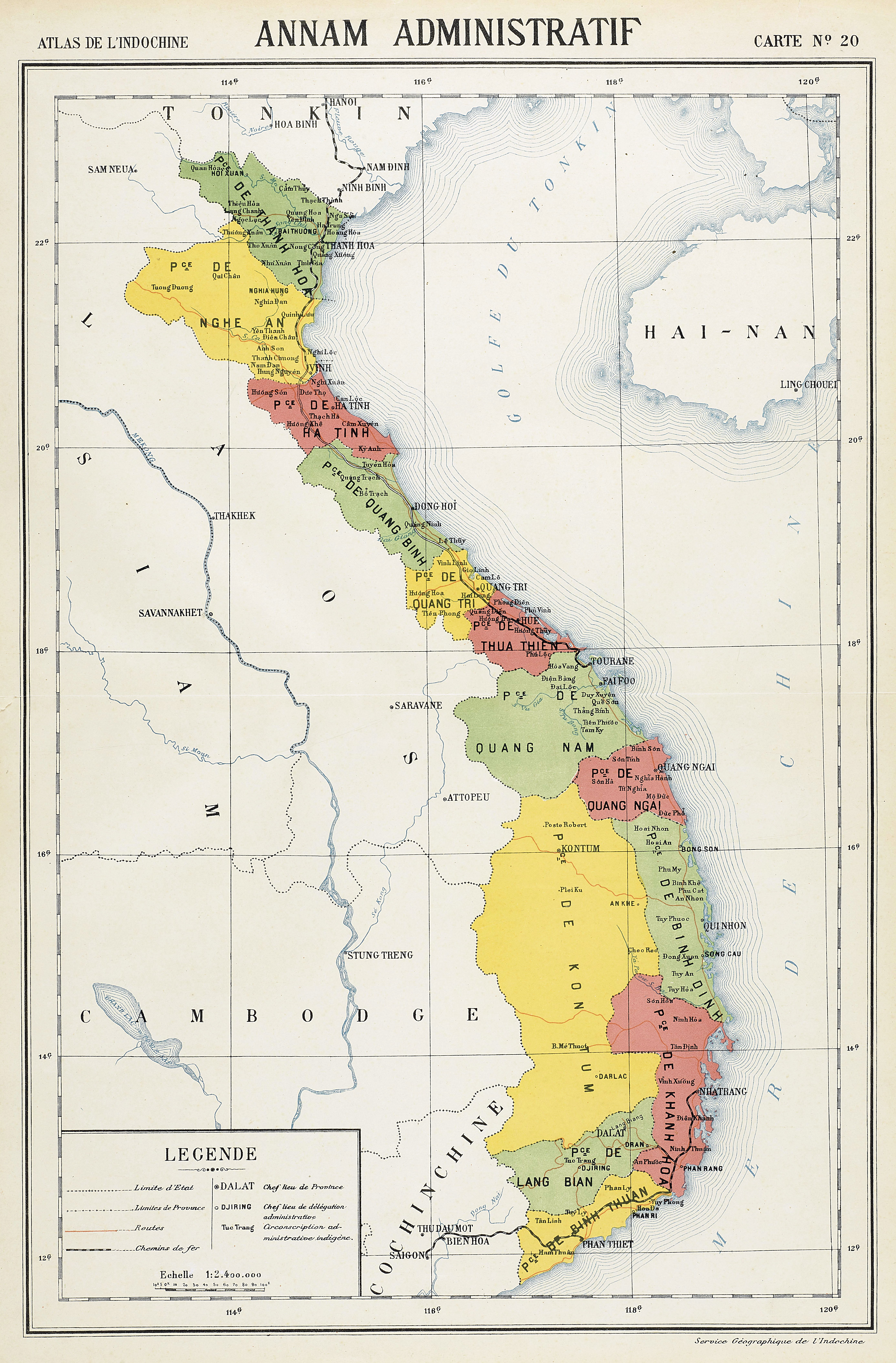
Administrative divisions of Annam 1920

Following the Treaty of Huế (1884), the North Central Coast as well as the South Central Coast became part of the Annam (French protectorate).

Four of the northernmost provinces of the north central coast region, fell within the communist-ruled North Vietnam (DRVN, controlled territory above 17th parallel according to Geneva accords), were hostile to the United States and ARVN forces throughout the Vietnam War as it was a NLF (Viet Cong) stronghold and patron.

== Culture ==
This region features three out of UNESCO's seven World Heritage Sites in Vietnam, namely: Phong Nha-Kẻ Bàng National Park (2003) under Natural, and Complex of Huế Monuments (1993) and Citadel of the Hồ Dynasty (2011) under Cultural.

== Economy ==
The Bắc Trung Bộ region has the second lowest GDP per capita in the country, while the Northwest (Tây Bắc) region ranks the lowest GDP per capita.

== Transport ==
The region is served by 4 airports:

- Phu Bai International Airport (for Huế)
- Vinh International Airport (serving Nghệ An and Hà Tĩnh)
- Tho Xuan Airport (serving Thanh Hóa)
- Dong Hoi Airport (for Quảng Trị)

== Demographics ==
The monthly income for the North Central Coast is 902,900 VND compared with the whole country of 1,387,200 VND (2010).

The percentage of households with permanent housing for the North Central Coast is 75.6% compared with the whole country of 49.2% (2010).

The household size for the North Central Coast is 3.94 (2010).

The percentage of the population aged 15 years old and over obtained the following education in the North Central Coast: Never go to school 5.2%; Primary 19.3%; Lower secondary 33.1%; Upper secondary 17.3%; College, University 5.2%; Postgraduate 0.1% (2010).

The percentage of the population aged 15 years old and over work in the following industries: Agriculture 59.9%; Forestry 2.1%; Fishery 1.8%; Industry 7.5%; Construction 6.6%; Trade 7.7%; Services 14.5% (2010).
