= List of endangered languages in Asia =

Language Endangerment Status by UNESCO Atlas of the World's Languages in Danger category

Extinct (EX)
- Extinct (EX): (lists)

Endangered
- Critically Endangered (CR); Severely Endangered (SE); Definitely Endangered (DE); Vulnerable (VU): (list); (list); (list); (list)

Safe
- Safe (NE): no list
- Other categories
- Revived (RE); Constructed (CL): (list); (list)
- Related topics: Atlas of the World's Languages in Danger; Endangered Languages Project; Ethnologue; Unclassified language; List of languages by total number of speakers
- UNESCO Atlas of the World's; Languages in Danger categories

An endangered language is a language that is at risk of falling out of use, generally because it has few surviving speakers. If it loses all of its native speakers, it becomes a dead language. A language may be endangered in one area but show signs of revitalisation in another, as with the Irish language.

The United Nations Educational, Scientific and Cultural Organization defines five levels of language endangerment between "safe" (not endangered) and "extinct":

- Vulnerable - "most children speak the language, but it may be restricted to certain domains (e.g., home)"
- Definitely endangered - "children no longer learn the language as mother tongue in the home"
- Severely endangered - "language is spoken by grandparents and older generations; while the parent generation may understand it, they do not speak it to children or among themselves"
- Critically endangered - "the youngest speakers are grandparents and older, and they speak the language partially and infrequently"
- Extinct - "there are no speakers left; included in the Atlas if presumably extinct since the 1950s"

The list below includes the findings from the third edition of Atlas of the World's Languages in Danger (2010; formerly the Red Book of Endangered Languages), as well as the online edition of the aforementioned publication, both published by UNESCO.

== Afghanistan ==
Afghanistan
Language	Status	Comments	ISO 639-3
Ashkun language	Definitely endangered		ask
Brahui language	Vulnerable	Also spoken in: Pakistan	brh
Central Asian Arabic language	Definitely endangered	Also spoken in: Uzbekistan, Tajikistan	abh, auz
Gambiri language (Tregami language)	Severely endangered		trm
Gawar-Bati language	Definitely endangered	Also spoken in: Pakistan	gwt
Kati language	Definitely endangered	Also spoken in: Pakistan	bsh, xvi
Moghol language	Critically endangered		mhj
Munji language	Severely endangered		mnj
Ningalami language	Severely endangered		nli
Ormuri language	Definitely endangered	Also spoken in: Pakistan	oru
Parachi language	Definitely endangered		prc
Parya language	Severely endangered	Also spoken in: Uzbekistan, Tajikistan	paq
Pashayi language	Vulnerable		aee, glh, psh, psi
Prasun language Wasi-wari language	Definitely endangered		prn
Rushani language	Definitely endangered	Also spoken in: Tajikistan	sgh
Sanglechi language	Severely endangered	Also spoken in: Tajikistan	sgl
Savi language	Definitely endangered	Also spoken in: Pakistan	sdg
Shughni language	Vulnerable	Also spoken in: Tajikistan	sgh
Shumashti language	Severely endangered		sts
Tirahi language	Critically endangered		tra
Waigali language	Definitely endangered		wbk
Wakhi language	Definitely endangered	Also spoken in: China, Pakistan, Tajikistan	wbl
Wotapuri-Katarqalai language	Definitely endangered		wsv

== Armenia ==
Armenia
Language	Status	Comments	ISO 639-3
Assyrian Neo-Aramaic language	Definitely endangered	Also spoken in: Iran, Iraq, Syria, Turkey	aii
Pontic Greek language	Definitely endangered	Also spoken in: Georgia, Greece, Russia, Turkey, Ukraine	pnt

== Azerbaijan ==
Azerbaijan
Language	Status	Comments	ISO 639-3
Budukh language	Severely endangered		bdk
Juhuri language Judeo-Tat language	Definitely endangered	Also spoken in: Russia	jdt
Khinalug language	Severely endangered		kjj
Kryz language	Severely endangered		kry
Lezgian language	Vulnerable	Also spoken in: Russia	lez
Rutul language	Definitely endangered	Also spoken in: Russia	rut
Talysh language	Vulnerable	Also spoken in: Iran	tly
Tat language	Severely endangered		ttt
Tsakhur language	Definitely endangered	Also spoken in: Russia	tkr
Udi language	Severely endangered		udi

== Bhutan ==
Bhutan
Language	Status	Comments	ISO 639-3
Black Mountain Monpa language	Definitely endangered		ole
Brokkat language	Definitely endangered		bro
Brokpa language	Definitely endangered		sgt
Bumthang language	Vulnerable		kjz
Chali language	Definitely endangered		tgf
Chocangaca language	Definitely endangered		cgk
Dakpa language	Definitely endangered	Also spoken in: India	dka
Dzala language	Vulnerable		dzl
Dzongkha language	Vulnerable		dzo
Gongduk language	Vulnerable		goe
Kheng language	Vulnerable		xkf
Kurtöp language	Vulnerable		xkz
Lakha language	Definitely endangered		lkh
Lepcha language	Definitely endangered	Also spoken in: India, Nepal	lep
Lhokpu language	Definitely endangered		lhp
Nupbikha language	Vulnerable		npb
Nyenkha language	Vulnerable		neh
Tawang language	Vulnerable	Also spoken in: China, India	twm
Tshangla language	Vulnerable	Also spoken in: China, India	tsj

== Burma (Myanmar) ==
Burma
Language	Status	Comments	ISO 639-3
Akeu language	Definitely endangered	Also spoken in: Laos, Thailand	aeu
Amok language	Critically endangered	Also spoken in: China, Laos, Thailand	mqt
Angku language	Critically endangered		
Anung language	Severely endangered		nun
Bisu language	Definitely endangered	Also spoken in: Thailand	bzi
Chothe language	Definitely endangered		nct
Danaw language	Critically endangered		dnu
Ganan language	Severely endangered		zkn
Kadu language	Severely endangered		kdv
Laomian language	Definitely endangered		lwm
Moklen language	Definitely endangered	Also spoken in: Thailand	mwt
Mon language	Vulnerable	Also spoken in: Thailand	mnw
Mru language	Severely endangered		mro
Palaung language	Severely endangered		pce
Pale language	Severely endangered		pce
Riang language	Critically endangered		ril
Rumai language	Severely endangered		rbb
Sak language	Vulnerable		ckh
Tailoi language	Critically endangered		tlq
Taruang language	Vulnerable	Also spoken in: China, India	mhu
Wa language	Severely endangered		prk or wbm

== Cambodia ==
Cambodia
Language	Status	Comments	ISO 639-3
Brao language	Severely endangered	Also spoken in: Laos, Vietnam	brb
Chong language	Severely endangered	Also spoken in: Thailand	cog
Kaco' language	Definitely endangered		xkk
Kasong language	Critically endangered	Also spoken in: Thailand	has no iso code
Kraol language	Critically endangered		rka
Kravet language	Critically endangered		krv
Krueng language	Severely endangered		krr
Kuay language	Severely endangered		kdt
Pear language	Severely endangered		pcb
Phnong language	Severely endangered		cmo
Sa'och language	Critically endangered	Also known as: Chung; Also spoken in: Thailand	scq
Somray language	Critically endangered	Also spoken in: Thailand	smu
Samre language	Critically endangered		sxm
Song language	Critically endangered		
Stieng language	Severely endangered		sti or stt
Tampuan language	Severely endangered		tpu
Western Cham language	Vulnerable		cja

== China ==
(Note: Taiwan area is not included in the list above. Related information is in section Taiwan.)

== Cyprus ==
Cyprus
Language	Status	Comments	ISO 639-3
Cypriot Arabic language	Severely endangered		acy

== East Timor ==
East Timor
Language	Status	Comments	ISO 639-3
Adabe language	Vulnerable		adb
Habu language	Vulnerable		hbu
Kairui-Midiki language	Vulnerable		krd
Maku'a language	Critically endangered		lva
Naueti language	Vulnerable		nxa
Waima'a language	Definitely endangered		wmh

== Georgia ==
Georgia
Language	Status	Comments	ISO 639-3
Abkhaz language	Vulnerable	Also spoken in: Russia, Turkey	abk
Bats language	Severely endangered		bbl
Bohtan Neo-Aramaic language	Severely endangered	Also spoken in: Russia	bhn
Homshetsma language Homshetsi dialect	Severely endangered	Also spoken in: Russia	hye (?)
Laz language	Definitely endangered	Also spoken in: Turkey	lzz
komi language	Definitely endangered		xmf
Ossetian language	Vulnerable	Also spoken in: Russia	oss
Pontic Greek language	Definitely endangered	Also spoken in: Armenia, Greece, Russia, Turkey, Ukraine	pnt
Svan language	Definitely endangered		sva
Udi language	Severely endangered		udi
Urum language	Definitely endangered	Also spoken in: Russia, Ukraine	uum

== Iran ==
Iran
Language	Status	Comments	ISO 639-3
Ashtiani language	Definitely endangered		atn
Assyrian Neo-Aramaic language	Definitely endangered	Also spoken in: Armenia, Iraq, Syria, Turkey	aii, cld
Bashkardi language	Definitely endangered		bsg
Dzhidi language	Definitely endangered		jpr
Gazi language	Definitely endangered		gzi
Hawrami language	Definitely endangered	Also spoken in: Iraq	bjm, hac, sdb, sdf
Khalaj language	Vulnerable		klj
Khorasani Turkic language	Vulnerable		kmz
Khunsari language	Definitely endangered		kfm
Koroshi language	Critically endangered		ktl
Lari language	Definitely endangered		lrl, fay
Mandaic language	Critically endangered	Also spoken in: Iraq	mid
Natanzi language	Severely endangered		ntz
Nayini language	Severely endangered		nyq
Semnani language	Definitely endangered		lsa, sgr, smy, sqo
Senaya language	Critically endangered		syn
Sivandi language	Definitely endangered		siy, faz
Soi language	Definitely endangered		soi
Talysh language	Vulnerable	Also spoken in: Azerbaijan	tly
Tati language	Definitely endangered		avd, esh, goz, hrz, kgn, okh, rat, rdb, shm, tks, tov, vmh, xkj, xkc, xkp
Vafsi language	Definitely endangered		vaf
Zoroastrian Dari language	Definitely endangered		gbz

== Iraq ==
Iraq
Language	Status	Comments	ISO 639-3
Adyge language	Definitely endangered	Also spoken in: Israel, Jordan, Macedonia, Russia, Syria, Turkey	ady
Hawrami language	Definitely endangered	Also spoken in: Iran	bjm, hac, sdb, sdf
Mandaic language	Critically endangered	Also spoken in: Iran	mid
Assyrian Neo-Aramaic language	Definitely endangered	Also spoken in: Armenia, Iran, Syria, Turkey	aii, cld
Western Armenian language	Definitely endangered	Also spoken in: Lebanon, Syria	hye

== Israel ==
Israel
Language	Status	Comments	ISO 639-3
Adyge language	Definitely endangered	Also spoken in: Iraq, Jordan, Macedonia, Russia, Syria, Turkey	ady
Barzani Jewish Neo-Aramaic language	Critically endangered		bjf
Domari language	Severely endangered	Also spoken in: Egypt, Jordan, Lebanon, Libya, Palestine, Syria	rmt
Hulaula language Hulaulá language	Severely endangered		huy
Judeo-Berber language	Severely endangered		jbe
Judezmo language	Severely endangered		lad
Juhuri language	Definitely endangered		jdt
Lishan Didan language	Severely endangered		trg
Lishana Deni language	Severely endangered		lsd
Lishanid Noshan language	Severely endangered		aij
Moroccan Judeo-Arabic language	Definitely endangered		aju
Judeo-Tunisian Arabic language	Severely endangered		ajt
Yiddish language	Definitely endangered		ydd

== Japan ==
Japan
Language	Status	Comments	ISO 639-3
Ainu language	Critically endangered		ain
Amami language	Definitely endangered		ams, kzg, ryn, tkn
Hachijō language	Definitely endangered		
Kunigami language	Definitely endangered		okn, xug, yox
Miyako language	Definitely endangered		mvi
Okinawan language	Definitely endangered		ryu
Yaeyama language	Severely endangered		rys
Yonaguni language	Severely endangered		yoi

== Jordan ==
Jordan
Language	Status	Comments	ISO 639-3
Adyge language	Vulnerable	Also spoken in: Iraq, Israel, Macedonia, Russia, Syria, Turkey	ady
Domari language	Severely endangered	Also spoken in: Egypt, Israel, Lebanon, Libya, Palestine, Syria	rmt

== Kazakhstan ==
Kazakhstan
Language	Status	Comments	ISO 639-3
Dungan language	Definitely endangered	Also spoken in: Kyrgyzstan	dng

== Korea ==
Korea
Language	Status	Comments	ISO 639-3
Jeju language	Critically endangered		jje

== Kyrgyzstan ==
Kyrgyzstan
Language	Status	Comments	ISO 639-3
Dungan language	Definitely endangered	Also spoken in: Kazakhstan	dng
Oyrat language	Definitely endangered	Also spoken in: China, Mongolia	xal

== Laos ==
Laos
Language	Status	Comments	ISO 639-3
Aheu language	Definitely endangered		thm
Akeu language	Definitely endangered	Also spoken in: Burma, Thailand	aeu
Amok language	Critically endangered	Also spoken in: China, Burma, Thailand	mqt
Arem language	Severely endangered	Also spoken in: Vietnam	aem
Bana language	Severely endangered		phq
Brao language	Severely endangered	Also spoken in: Cambodia, Vietnam	brb
Chatong language	Definitely endangered		
Chepya language	Definitely endangered		ycp
Dakkang language	Definitely endangered		
Hung language	Definitely endangered	Also spoken in: Vietnam	hnu
Juk language	Definitely endangered		
Kri language	Severely endangered		aem
Maleng language	Definitely endangered		pkt
May language	Definitely endangered	Also spoken in: Vietnam	scb
Mlabri language	Definitely endangered	Also spoken in: Thailand	mra
Mok language	Definitely endangered		tlq
O’du language	Critically endangered		tyh
Poong language	Definitely endangered		hnu
Phunoi language	Vulnerable	could be multiple languages	pho
Phong-Kniang language	Definitely endangered		pnx
Psing language	Definitely endangered		bgk
Ruc language	Definitely endangered	Also spoken in: Vietnam	scb
Sach language	Definitely endangered	Also spoken in: Vietnam	scb
Saek language	Definitely endangered	Also spoken in: Thailand	skb
Sila language (Laos)	Definitely endangered	Also spoken in: Vietnam	slt
Tai Daeng language	Vulnerable	Also spoken in: Vietnam	tyr
Tai Neua language	Vulnerable		tdd
Thavung language	Definitely endangered	Also spoken in: Thailand	thm
Theen language	Severely endangered		
Triw language	Definitely endangered		kuf? (or Bru related?)
Tum language	Definitely endangered		= Poong

== Lebanon ==
Lebanon
Language	Status	Comments	ISO 639-3
Domari language	Severely endangered	Also spoken in: Egypt, Israel, Jordan, Libya, Palestine, Syria	rmt
Western Armenian language	Definitely endangered	Also spoken in: Iraq, Syria	hye

== Malaysia ==
Malaysia
Language	Status	Comments	ISO 639-3
Abai Sungai language	Definitely endangered		abf
Batek language	Critically endangered		btq
Cheq Wong language	Definitely endangered		cwg
Duano' language	Critically endangered		dup
Jah Hut language	Severely endangered		jah
Jahai language	Critically endangered		jhi
Kanowit language	Severely endangered		kxn
Kensiw language	Critically endangered		kns
Kintaq language	Critically endangered		knq
Kristang language	Severely endangered		mcm
Lanoh language	Critically endangered		lnh
Mah Meri language	Severely endangered		mhe
Menriq language	Critically endangered		mnq
Jakun language	Definitely endangered		jak
Orang Seletar language	Severely endangered		ors
Punan Batu language	Critically endangered		pnm
Semai language	Severely endangered		sca
Semaq Beri language	Critically endangered		szc
Semelai language	Severely endangered		sza
Sian language	Severely endangered		spg
Temiar language	Definitely endangered		tea
Temuan language	Severely endangered		tmw
Ukit language			umi

== Mongolia ==
Mongolia
Language	Status	Comments	ISO 639-3
Buryat language	Definitely endangered	Also spoken in: China and Russia	bxm, bxr, bxu
Dukha language	Severely endangered		
Evenki language	Severely endangered	Also spoken in: Russia	evn, orh
Khamnigan Mongol language	Definitely endangered	Also spoken in: China, Russia	
Khövsgöl Uryangkhay language	Critically endangered		
Oyrat language	Definitely endangered	Also spoken in: China, Kyrgyzstan	xal
Tuvan language	Vulnerable	Also spoken in: China, Russia	tyv

== Oman ==
Oman
Language	Status	Comments	ISO 639-3
Bathari language	Critically endangered		bhm
Harsusi language	Definitely endangered		hss
Hobyot language	Severely endangered	Also spoken in: Yemen	hoh
Jibbali language	Severely endangered		shv
Khojki language Luwati language	Severely endangered		luv
Kumzari language	Severely endangered		zum
Mehri language	Definitely endangered	Also spoken in: Yemen	gdq
Zidgali language	Critically endangered		

== Pakistan ==
Pakistan
Language	Status	Comments	ISO 639-3
Balti language	Vulnerable	Also spoken in: India	bft
Bashkarik language	Definitely endangered		gwc, xka
Badeshi language	Critically endangered	Only 3 speakers left	bdz
Bateri language	Definitely endangered		btv
Bhadravahi language	Definitely endangered	Also spoken in: India	bhd
Brahui language	Vulnerable	Also spoken in: Afghanistan	brh
Burushaski language	Vulnerable		bsk
Chilisso language	Severely endangered		clh
Dameli language	Severely endangered		dml
Domaaki language	Severely endangered		dmk
Gawar-Bati language	Definitely endangered	Also spoken in: Afghanistan	gwt
Gowro language	Severely endangered		gwf
Jad language	Definitely endangered	Also spoken in: India	jda
Kalasha language	Severely endangered	Not to be confused with Kalasha-ala language	kls
Kalkoti language	Severely endangered		
Kati language Kamkata-viri language, Kata-vari dialect Kamviri dialect	Definitely endangered	Also spoken in: Afghanistan	bsh, xvi
Khowar language	Vulnerable		khw
Kundal Shahi language	Definitely endangered	Also spoken in: India	
Maiya language	Vulnerable		mvy
Ormuri language	Definitely endangered	Also spoken in: Afghanistan	oru
Phalura language	Definitely endangered		phl
Purik language	Vulnerable	Also spoken in: India	prx
Savi language	Definitely endangered	Also spoken in: Afghanistan	sdg
Spiti language	Vulnerable	Also spoken in: India	spt
Torwali language	Definitely endangered		trw
Ushojo language	Definitely endangered		ush
Wakhi language	Definitely endangered	Also spoken in: China, Tajikistan, Afghanistan	wbl
Yidgha language	Definitely endangered		ydg
Zangskari language	Definitely endangered	Also spoken in: India	zau

== Palestine ==
Palestine
Language	Status	Comments	ISO 639-3
Domari language	Severely endangered	Also spoken in: Egypt, Israel, Jordan, Lebanon, Libya, Syria	rmt

== Philippines ==
Philippines
Language	Status	Comments	ISO 639-3
Alabat Island Agta language	Critically endangered		dul
Bataan Ayta language	Definitely endangered		ayt
Batak language	Definitely endangered		bya
Camarines Norte Agta language	Severely endangered		abd
Central Cagayan Agta language	Vulnerable		agt
Dupaninan Agta language	Vulnerable		duo
Faire Atta language	Severely endangered		azt
Isarog Agta language	Critically endangered		agk
Mt. Iraya Agta language	Definitely endangered		atl
Northern Alta language	Severely endangered		aqn
Ratagnon language	Severely endangered		btn
Sorsogon Ayta language	Critically endangered		ays

== Sri Lanka ==
Sri Lanka
Language	Status	Comments	ISO 639-3
Vedda language	Definitely endangered	may be extinct	ved

== Syria ==
Syria
Language	Status	Comments	ISO 639-3
Adyge language	Vulnerable	Also spoken in: Iraq, Israel, Jordan, Macedonia, Russia, Turkey	ady
Domari language	Severely endangered	Also spoken in: Egypt, Israel, Jordan, Lebanon, Libya, Palestine	rmt
Assyrian Neo-Aramaic language	Definitely endangered	Also spoken in: Armenia, Iran, Iraq, Turkey	aii, cld
Turoyo language	Severely endangered	Also spoken in: Turkey	tru
Western Armenian language	Definitely endangered	Also spoken in: Iraq, Lebanon	hye
Western Neo-Aramaic language	Definitely endangered		amw

== Taiwan ==
Taiwan
Language	Status	Comments	ISO 639-3
Amis language	Vulnerable	Amis was added to the list as "Vulnerable" in June, 2017	ami
Bunun language	Definitely endangered		bnn
Kanakanavu language	Critically endangered		xnb
Kavalan language	Critically endangered		ckv
Nataoran language	Critically endangered		ais
Paiwan language	Vulnerable		pwn
Pyuma language	Vulnerable	Pyuma was added to the list as "Vulnerable" in June, 2017	pyu
Rukai language	Vulnerable		dru
Saaroa language	Critically endangered		sxr
Saisiyat language	Severely endangered		xsy
Taroko language	Vulnerable	Taroko was added to the list as "Vulnerable" in June, 2017	trv
Tayal language	Vulnerable	Tayal was added to the list as "Vulnerable" in June, 2017	tay
Thao language	Critically endangered		ssf
Tsou language	Vulnerable	Tsou was added to the list as "Vulnerable" in June, 2017	tsy
Yami language	Vulnerable	Yami was added to the list as "Vulnerable" in June, 2017	tao

== Tajikistan ==
Tajikistan
Language	Status	Comments	ISO 639-3
Bartangi language	Severely endangered		sgh
Central Asian Arabic language	Definitely endangered	Also spoken in: Uzbekistan, Afghanistan	abh, auz
Ishkashimi language	Severely endangered		sgl
Parya language	Severely endangered	Also spoken in: Uzbekistan, Afghanistan	paq
Roshorvi language	Severely endangered		sgh
Rushani language	Definitely endangered	Also spoken in: Afghanistan	sgh
Sanglechi language	Severely endangered	Also spoken in: Afghanistan	sgl
Shughni language	Vulnerable	Also spoken in: Afghanistan	sgh
Wakhi language	Definitely endangered	Also spoken in: China, Pakistan, Afghanistan	wbl
Yaghnobi language	Definitely endangered		yai
Yazgulami language	Severely endangered		yah

== Thailand ==
Thailand
Language	Status	Comments	ISO 639-3
Akeu language	Definitely endangered	Also spoken in: Laos, Burma	aeu
Amok language	Critically endangered	Also spoken in: China, Laos, Burma	mqt
Bisu language	Definitely endangered	Also spoken in: Burma	bzi
Bru language	Definitely endangered		brv
Chong language	Severely endangered	Ethnic remnant in: Cambodia	cog
Gong language	Severely endangered		ugo
Kasong language	Critically endangered	Also spoken in: Cambodia	
Kensiw language	Severely endangered		kns
Kuy language	Definitely endangered		nyl ?
Lavua language	Definitely endangered		lcp
Lua language	Definitely endangered		prb
Maniq language	Definitely endangered		tnz
Mlabri language	Definitely endangered	Also spoken in: Laos	mra
Mok language	Definitely endangered		mqt
Moklen language	Definitely endangered	Also spoken in: Burma	mwt
Mon language	Vulnerable	Also spoken in: Burma	mnw
Mpi language	Definitely endangered		mpz
Nyah Kur language	Definitely endangered		cbn
Pattani Malay language	Vulnerable		mfa
Saek language	Definitely endangered	Also spoken in: Laos	skb
Sa'och language	Critically endangered	Also known as: Chung; Also spoken in: Cambodia	scq
Somray language	Critically endangered	Also spoken in: Cambodia	smu
Thavung language	Definitely endangered	Also spoken in: Laos	thm
Urak Lawoi language	Definitely endangered		urk

== Turkey ==
Turkey
Language	Status	Comments	ISO 639-3
Abaza language	Definitely endangered	Also spoken in: Russia	abq
Abkhaz language	Vulnerable	Also spoken in: Georgia, Russia	abk
Adyghe language	Definitely endangered	Also spoken in: Iraq, Israel, Jordan, Macedonia, Russia, Syria	ady
Assyrian Neo-Aramaic language	Definitely endangered	Also spoken in: Armenia, Iran, Iraq, Syria	aii, cld
Gagauz language	Severely endangered	Also spoken in: Greece, Macedonia	bgx, gag
Hértevin language	Critically endangered		hrt
Homshetsma language	Definitely endangered		hye
Judezmo language	Severely endangered	Also spoken in: Albania, Algeria, Bosnia and Herzegovina, Bulgaria, Croatia, Greece, Macedonia, Morocco, Romania, Serbia	lad
Kabard-Cherkes language	Vulnerable	Also spoken in: Russia	kbd
Laz language	Definitely endangered	Also spoken in: Georgia	lzz
Pontic Greek language	Definitely endangered	Also spoken in: Armenia, Georgia, Greece, Russia, Ukraine	pnt
Romani language	Definitely endangered	Also spoken in: Albania, Germany, Austria, Belarus, Bosnia and Herzegovina, Bulgaria, Croatia, Estonia, Finland, France, Greece, Hungary, Italy, Latvia, Lithuania, Macedonia, Netherlands, Poland, Romania, United Kingdom, Russia, Slovakia, Slovenia, Switzerland, Czech Republic, Ukraine, Serbia, Montenegro	rmc, rmf, rml, rmn, rmo, rmw, rmy
Turoyo language	Severely endangered	Also spoken in: Syria	tru
Western Armenian language	Definitely endangered		hye
Zazaki language	Vulnerable		zza

== Turkmenistan ==
Turkmenistan
Language	Status	Comments	ISO 639-3
Trukhmen language	Definitely endangered	Also spoken in: Russia	

== Uzbekistan ==
Uzbekistan
Language	Status	Comments	ISO 639-3
Bukharic language	Definitely endangered		bhh
Central Asian Arabic language	Definitely endangered	Also spoken in: Tajikistan, Afghanistan	abh, auz
Parya language	Severely endangered	Also spoken in: Tajikistan, Afghanistan	paq

== Vietnam ==
Vietnam
Language	Status	Comments	ISO 639-3
Arem language	Severely endangered	Also spoken in: Laos	aem
Baheng language	Vulnerable		pha
Brao language	Severely endangered	Also spoken in: Cambodia, Laos	brb
Chrau language	Definitely endangered		crw
Chru language	Vulnerable		cje
Cốông language	Definitely endangered		cnc
Cosung language	Definitely endangered		lkc
Eastern Cham language	Definitely endangered		cjm
En language	Critically endangered		enc
Green Gelao language	Critically endangered		giq
Hung language	Definitely endangered	Also spoken in: Laos	hnu
O'du language	Critically endangered		tyh
Kháng language	Severely endangered. Compare to Quang Lam language, Kháng language		kjm
Lachi language	Definitely endangered		lwh
Laghuu language	Definitely endangered		lgh
Laha language	Definitely endangered		lha
Mang language	Definitely endangered		zng
May language	Definitely endangered	Also spoken in: Laos	scb
Mo'ang language	Definitely endangered		
Nguon language	Vulnerable		nuo
Nung Ven language	Vulnerable		enc
Phula language	Definitely endangered		ypa, ypg, ypo, yip, ypn, yhl, ypb, phh, ypm, ypp, yph, ypz
Red Gelao language	Critically endangered		gir
Ruc language	Definitely endangered	Also spoken in: Laos	scb
Sach language	Definitely endangered	Also spoken in: Laos	scb
Sila language (Laos)	Definitely endangered	Also spoken in: Laos	slt
Tai Daeng language	Vulnerable	Also spoken in: Laos	tyr
White Gelao language	Severely endangered	Also spoken in: China	giw

== Yemen ==
Yemen
Language	Status	Comments	ISO 639-3
Hobyot language	Severely endangered	Also spoken in: Oman	hoh
Mehri language	Definitely endangered	Also spoken in: Oman	gdq
Razihi language	Definitely endangered		
Soqotri language	Severely endangered		sqt
