= Vietic peoples =

Asian ethnic groups

Vietic
Total population
- ~90,000,000 (~4,500,000 overseas)

Regions with significant populations
- Vietnam, Laos, Thailand, Cambodia

Languages
- Vietic languages

Religion
- Folk religion (ancestor worship, animism, shamanism), Buddhism, Christianity, Hoahaoism, Caodaism

Related ethnic groups
- Katuic peoples, Khmuic peoples, Mon–Khmer peoples and Munda peoples

Vietic peoples refer to ethnic groups in Southeast Asia who speak Vietic languages.

== Geographic distribution ==
The Vietic peoples are aboriginal to northern Vietnam, Laos and surrounding areas, mostly in northern Annamite mountains. They can also be found in Thailand, Cambodia and China.

== Origin ==
The proto-Vietic peoples are believed to have migrated by land from China to Laos and Vietnam through the Mekong, where they had settled for at least 4,500 years. Although there is no good estimate, paleolithic human sites around the modern Vietic villages in Laos and Nghe An are dated 2,500 to 2,000 BC, indicates that perhaps they were. They were parts of the larger proto-Austroasiatic peoples, who inhabited widely on neolithic mainland Southeast Asia. A human fossil site of these hunter-gatherers excavated in a cave at Pha Phen, 12 kilometres south of Lak Sao, Bolikhamsai Province is dated to 6190 BP (4190 BC). The Katuic people separated from Vieto-Katuic to be an independent group around 1,000 BC.

Nghệ An is regarded in Vietnam as the "Vietic homeland" after the Austroasiatic exodus from Yunnan (also believed to be a tribute to North Vietnamese leader Ho Chi Minh's birthplace). Anthropologists however considered the large area along the Northern Annamites Mountains from Nghệ An to Quảng Bình Province in Vietnam, Bolikhamsai to Khammouane Province in Laos as the traditional Vietic homeland, due to high amount of diversity of archaic Vietic groups and languages present in the region. not in the Red River Delta, which had been originally inhabited by Tai speakers However, archaeogenetics demonstrated that before the Đông Sơn period, the Red River Delta's inhabitants were predominantly Austroasiatic: genetic data from Phùng Nguyên culture's Mán Bạc burial site (dated to 1,800 BCE, thus predating Proto-Vietic, which is dated to 1,000 BCE) have close proximity to modern Austroasiatic speakers; meanwhile, "mixed genetics" from Đông Sơn culture's Núi Nấp site showed affinity to "Dai from China, Tai-Kadai speakers from Thailand, and Austroasiatic speakers from Vietnam, including the Việt"; Therefore, "[t]he likely spread of Vietic was southward from the [Red River Delta], not northward. Accounting for southern diversity will require alternative explanations."

== History ==
The Northern groups of the Vietics, residing in the norde-extremê Annamites (part of ancient Jiaozhi and Jiuzhen) and known as the Viet-Muong, had intensive contacts and interactions with the Tai people and Sinitic colonists from the north during the thousand years of Chinese rule. Based on linguistic evidence and historical records, anthropologists believe that the Viet-Muong eventually separated into two independent groups, Vietnamese and Muong, sometime between the seventh and tenth centuries (Tang dynasty).

Isolated tribes of Vietics on the Laotian side of the Annamite mountains remained intact with limited outside influence. These tribes stayed out of the regions politics despite numerous contests between the Khmer, the Vietnamese, and the Chinese over the region from the year 722 to the mid-twelfth century. The Siamese launched several catastrophic raids onto Laotian Vietic areas between 1826 and 1860 as part of their punitive expeditions against the Vientiane Kingdom, greatly depopulating many Vietic villages.

During the late nineteenth century, the Laotian Vietic homeland of Khammouane (now Khamkeut District, Bolikhamsai Province and Nakai-Nam Theun National Park) experienced the massive arrival of Tai-speaking and Hmong-speaking groups from Houaphanh and Nghệ An. These migrating populations included many former Zhuang warriors fleeing the Taiping Rebellion in China, social upheavals and unrest in Vietnam, and Khmu Ho-Chueng war in Northern Laos. The new settlers immediately dominated the indigenous Vietic villagers, sometimes hiring them as labors. Some of Vietic groups were labeled as Puak to indicate their vassalage, or simply called "Kha" by the Tais. Originally Laotian Vietic groups that now speak Tai and Lao languages, for example, the Bo, were perhaps results of the Taization process: the willingness of adoption of the language and culture of the dominant, outnumbering group by minority groups. As explained by a Tai Khang leader in Bolikhamsai: "We are Lao Loum; before we were Kha, but we decided to adopt Lao language and became Lao Loum, and now we have forgotten our Kha language." Anthropologists note that similar processes happened to many other Mon-Khmer speaking peoples in surrounding places.

The history of the Southeast Vietics (Chutic) is lesser known, especially the Ruc. They were encountered in 1959 by Vietnamese soldiers in Sơn Đoòng Cave, Quảng Bình Province as a hundred naked tribesmen dwelling in a cave. Since then, Chutic groups, including the Ruc, have been resettled by the North Vietnamese government in Cu Nhái, Quảng Bình. However, new reports say that one third of the Ruc population have returned to the forest, dwelling in valleys that stand 2,000 meters above the sea level, with many suffering from jungle malaria.

== Classification and language ==
Currently there exist 25 Vietic ethnic groups expressing diverse lifestyles ranging from integration into nation-states to living as nomadic foragers. Many subsist as rice-paddy cultivators, inhabiting the hilly, mountainous landmass stretching from Bolikhamsai Province to Khammouane Province in Laos and from Nghệ An to Quảng Bình Province in Vietnam, heavily concentrating in Khamkhuet and Nakai Valley.

Their languages are classified to belong to the Vietic language family, which is a branch of the Austro-Asiatic language family.

- Northern Vietic (Viet-Muong): Vietnamese, Muong, Nguồn people.
- Northwest Vietic: Thổ (Tuom, Liha, Phong).
- West Vietic: Thavueng (Aloe, Ahao, Ahlao).
- Southeast Vietic (Chutic): Chứt (Rục, Mày, Arem, Mã Liềng, Sách, Salang).
- Southwest Vietic: Bo, Arao, Atel, Atop, Kaleung, Maleng, Pakatan, Themarou, Kri, Phoong, Mlengbrou. The Bo and the Kaleung are perhaps Vietic groups that recently switched to Tai languages.

=== Concerns on NT2 Project impact ===
Concerns on environmental and anthropological impacts that potential cause consequences to the Laotian Vietic peoples in the Nakai-Nam Theum 2 Watershed National Protected Area (NPA) and Peripheral Impact Zone (PIZ) began to grow when the permission of constructing the reservoir Nam Theun 2 Dam (NT2 Project) on the Nam Theun, Nam Noy and Nam Nyang Rivers, basically inside the Nakai-Nam Theun National Park and Nakai valley, areas where indigenous West and Southwest Vietic ethnic groups had been inhabiting for thousand years, was opened in 1997. The NT2 Project was a BOT dam which was mainly fundraised by the World Bank and the Asian Development Bank (ADB), they would be handed to the Laotian government. The project's mismanagement of indigenous resettling left a traumatic impact on the vulnerable Vietic villagers and they had to be relocated far away from their homeland. Most concerns raised on Vietic type I ethnic groups who themselves heavily rely on nomadic lifestyle in the forests, due to the hydroelectric project's deforestation, and many tribes do not wish to engage and practice permanent sedentary agriculture in new allocated settlements. Plans to restore the livelihoods of villagers on the Nakai Plateau and along the Xe Bang Fai River have yet to be ratified. According to a POE (International Panel of Environmental and Social Experts) report in 2015, the percentage of Vietic villagers among new settlements dropped from 67.4% to 35% within 8 years, while Tai-speaking groups practically and economically dominating them. Other concerns such as government's integrated different Vietic groups with Tai and Hmong villages, and grouping smaller minorities, where Vietic labors were not only exploited by other groups in the villages but also discriminated in term of livelihood opportunities and healthcare.

A safeguard recommendation to the WB in 2004 said: OD 4.20 [the WB safeguard on Indigenous Peoples] emphasizes participatory processes, requiring development of minority plans “based on consideration of the options preferred by the indigenous peoples affected by the project.” It also emphasizes the importance of “ensuring genuine representation” (ibid) among people whose “social and economic status restricts their capacity to assert their interests and rights” (Para. 2). To achieve policy objectives regarding the Vietic Type I people, special measures should be devised for their protection, and to ensure that they are afforded opportunities to participate in the process of devising culturally appropriate benefits... Specific arrangements for monitoring project-related impacts on Vietic Type I groups should be provided. Quote – Unquote (Gibson/WB BTOR 2004). The recommendation was unfortunately ignored.

The population of many Vietic ethnic groups in the region has been drastically decreased in recent years. The POE report found that four extreme vulnerable Vietic groups in the NPA and PIZ that are at risk of being extinct by the early twenty-first century: the Atel (16+), the Themarou (30+), the Mlengbrou (9), and the Ahoe. Among them, the Atel, the Themarou, and the Mlengbrou were previously nomadic hunter-gatherers, are not willing to adopt and practice the new sedentary lifestyle and intensive agriculture following government resettling program for ethnic minorities in the 1970s and the 1980s, and are still reliant much on the forest for accommodating much of their standard of living. Those tribes' populations have been plummeting from hundred people to just few individuals during recent decades, and could not survive as unique ethnic identities without intermarrying with other Vietic groups. It is highly likely that intermarriage between various Vietic tribes have been occurred throughout the last centuries. Special measures of the EMDP would be planning to address the Vietic groups which are most at risk. As the future fate of the affected Vietic groups in Nakai Valley would be an inevitable extinction if no major action undertaken to protect and conserve, James R. Chamberlain, researcher and editor of Handbook of the Changing World Language Map, blames the government's incomprehensible action on indigenous Vietic peoples around the NT2 impacted areas that led to the trouble. Khamsone, the shaman of the Ahoe, called the NT2 project's promise a lie. The Ahoe believe that after death they will be reborn as squirrels, haunting the forests that surround the NT2 dam site, Ahoe spiritual territory.

== Society ==
The isolating Vietics in Laos (exclude the Vietnamese and the Muong) are generally divided by anthropologists into four categories per lifestyle:

- Vietic type I: Nomadic Hunter-gatherers (Atop, Atel, Makang, Thémarou, Mlengbrou, Chuet).
- Vietic type II: Recently Slash-and-burn (Arao, Malang, Maleng, T'oe, Phoong–lower Noy-Pheo river).
- Vietic type III: Slash-and-burn, villages (Kri–upper Noy-Pheo river).
- Vietic type IV: Rice farmers, slash-and-burn (Ahoe, Ahao, Ahlao, Liha, Toum, Phong, Pakatan).

== Works cited ==
- Alves, Mark (2019). "Data from Multiple Disciplines Connecting Vietic with the Dong Son Culture". ResearchGate.
- Babaev, Kirill; Samarina, Irina (2021). Sidwell, Paul (ed.). A Grammar of May: An Austroasiatic Language of Vietnam. Brill. ISBN 978-9-00446-108-6.
- Chamberlain, James (2019), "Vanishing Nomads: Languages and Peoples of Nakai, Laos, and Adjacent Areas", in Brunn, Stanley; Kehrein, Roland (eds.), Handbook of the Changing World Language Map, Vientiane: Springer International Publishing, pp. 1589–1606, ISBN 978-3-03002-437-6
- deBuys, William (2015). The Last Unicorn: A Search for One of Earth's Rarest Creatures. Hachette Book Group. ISBN 978-0-31623-288-3.
- Enfield, N. J. (2021). The Languages of Mainland Southeast Asia. Cambridge University Press. ISBN 978-0-190-05379-6.
- Kiernan, Ben (2019). Việt Nam: a history from earliest time to the present. Oxford University Press. ISBN 978-0-190-05379-6.
- Montgomery, Sy; Galbreath, Garry J. (2009). Search for the Golden Moon Bear. New England Compact Disc.
- Ovesen, Jan (2008), "All Lao? Minorities in the Lao's People Democratic Republic", in Christopher R., Duncan (ed.), Civilizing the Margins: Southeast Asian Government Policies for the Development of Minorities, NUS Press, pp. 214–240, ISBN 978-9-97169-418-0
- Robichaud, William (2018). Dead in the Water: Global Lessons from the World Bank's Model Hydropower Project in Laos. University of Wisconsin Press. ISBN 978-0-299-31790-4.
- Schliesinger, Joachim (2003a). Ethnic Groups of Laos: Profiles of Austro-Asiatic-speaking peoples. White Lotus Press. ISBN 978-9-744-80036-7.
- Schliesinger, Joachim (2003b). Ethnic Groups of Laos: Profiles of Austro-Thai-speaking peoples. White Lotus Press. ISBN 978-9-744-80037-4.
- Scudder, Thayer (2021), "A retrospective analysis of Laos's Nam Theun 2 Dam", in Cecilia, Tortajada; Eduardo, Araral (eds.), Global Water Resources: Festschrift in Honour of Asit K. Biswas, Taylor & Francis, pp. 129–148, ISBN 978-1-00045-503-8
- Trankell, Ing-Britt; Summers, Laura (1998). Facets of Power and Its Limitations Political Culture in Southeast Asia. Nordic Association for Southeast Asian Studies. Conference. ISBN 978-9-15544-124-1.
