= Tai Yo language =

Kra–Dai language spoken in Vietnam

Tai Yo
- 𞛍𞛮𞛗 / ไทญ้อ
- The word "Tai Yo" written in the Lai Tay script
- Region: Isan, Mekong floodplain, Vietnam
- Ethnicity: Nyaw
- Native speakers: (60,000 cited 1990 – 1995 census)
- Language family: Kra–Dai: Tai; Northern or Southwestern; Tai Yo
- Writing system: Latin (Vietnamese alphabet) (Vietnam); Thai script (Thailand); Lai Tay script (archaic)

Language codes
- ISO 639-3: Either: tyj – Tai Yo nyw – Tai Nyaw
- Glottolog: taid1248

Tai Yo (Thai: ไทญ้อ), also known as Tai Mène (Thai: ไทแมน) and (Tai) Nyaw (Thai: ญ้อ), is a Tai language of Southeast Asia. It is closely related to Tai Pao of Vietnam, where it may have originated. It was once written in a unique script, the Tai Yo script, but that is no longer in use. The language is known regionally in Laos and Thailand as Tai Mène and Tai Nyaw and, in Vietnam as Tai Do (old-fashioned English transcription) and Tai Quy Chau. Superficially, Tai Yo appears to be a Southwestern Tai language but this is only because of centuries of language contact and it is properly classified with the Northern Tai languages. The Nyaw/Nyo spoken in central Thailand and western Cambodia is not the same as Tai Yo.

== Tai Mène (Tai Maen) ==
The Mène people of Laos claim to be from Xieng Mène (also Xieng My) in Vietnam. These two names correspond to the following two towns in Nghệ An Province, Vietnam, located near Quỳ Châu (Chamberlain 1998).

- Xiềng Líp: located at the Nam Lip and Nam Chou (Houay Cha Ha) confluence, near the Cha Ha and Nam Ngoen (Ngân) confluence (which converge to form the Nam Souang or Houay Nguyên).
- Bản Pốt: located further east on the Nam Ngân.

Tai Mène appears to be related to Tai Pao (paaw 4 < *baaw A), whose speakers claim to have originated from Tương Dương District, Nghệ An province, Vietnam (Chamberlain 1991). Tai Mène or related languages may have also been spoken in Thường Xuân District, Thanh Hóa, Vietnam by the Yo (Do) people (Robequain 1929).

=== Distribution ===
Tai Mène is spoken in Borikhamxay Province, in many villages of Khamkeut District and several villages in Vieng Thong District (Chamberlain 1998). The Vietic languages Liha, Phong, Toum, Ayoy, Maleng, and Thaveung are spoken nearby.

- Lak Xao subdistrict: Ban Phon Hong, Ban Houay Keo
- Khamkeut subdistrict: Ban Phon Sa-at, Ban Phon Meuang Noy
- Na Heuang subdistrict: Lak 10, Lak 12, Na Khi
- Nam Sak subdistrict: Ban Phon Ngam, Ban Sop Khi
- Sop Chat subdistrict: Ban Sop Chat, Ban Sop Mong, Ban Phon Keo, Ban Sène Sy, Ban Tham Bing, Ban Phiang Pone
- Ka'ane subdistrict: Ban Thène Kwang, Ban Pha Poun, Ban Phiang Phô, Ban Sane, Ban Kok Feuang
- Phon Thoen subdistrict: Keng Kwang, Ban Kătô', Ban Kane Nha, Ban Keng Bit, Ban Sop Gnouang, Ban Vang Xao, Ban Tha Bak, Ban Kăpap
- Sop Pone subdistrict: Ban Sot, Ban Tha Sala, Ban Boung Kham
- Tha Veng subdistrict: Ban Phon Xay, Ban Kong Phat, Ban Xam Toey, Ban Na Khwan, Ban Phou Viang

== Phonology ==
=== Consonants ===
		Bilabial	Alveolar	Palatal	Velar	Glottal
Plosive/ Affricate	voiceless	p	t	tɕ	k	ʔ
Plosive/ Affricate	aspirated	pʰ	tʰ		kʰ	
Plosive/ Affricate	voiced	b	d			
Fricative		f	s			h
Nasal		m	n	ɲ	ŋ	
Lateral			l			
Semi-vowel		w		j		

- /f/ only occurs in the Nakhon Phanom and Prachin Buri dialects.

=== Vowels ===
	Front	Central	Back	
	Front	Central	unr.	rnd.
Close	i iː		ɯ ɯː	u uː
Mid	e eː		ɤ ɤː	o oː
Open	ɛ ɛː	a aː		ɔ ɔː

- Vowels /ɯ, ɯː/ and /ɤ, ɤː/ may also be heard as central [ɨ, ɨː]; [ə, əː].
