= Bo people (Laos) =

Ethnic group in Laos

Bo
Total population
- 2,950–4,200

Regions with significant populations
- Bolikhamxai province and Khammouane province, Laos

Languages
- Lao, Nyo

Religion
- Christianity, Shamanism

Related ethnic groups
- Kri, Maleng

The Bo are an ethnic group of Laos. The Bo population is primarily spread throughout Bolikhamxai and Khammouane provinces in central Laos.

== Synopsis and status ==
"Bo" simply means "mine." This implies that the Bo were originally a miner tribe of Kha (Mon-Khmer) origins. It is unclear whether the Bo are qualified to be a recognized ethnic group due to their overlapping identity.

There are two branches of the Bo: the Tai Bo of the Hinboun River speak Lao, while the Kha Bo of Nakai Plateau speak Nyo. Both used to be Vietic speakers but switched to speak Tai languages during the First Indochina War.

Tai Bo and Kha Bo elderly still could speak a language variant that is believed to be related or close to either Kri or Maleng language.
