= Chứt people =

Ethnic group

Chut
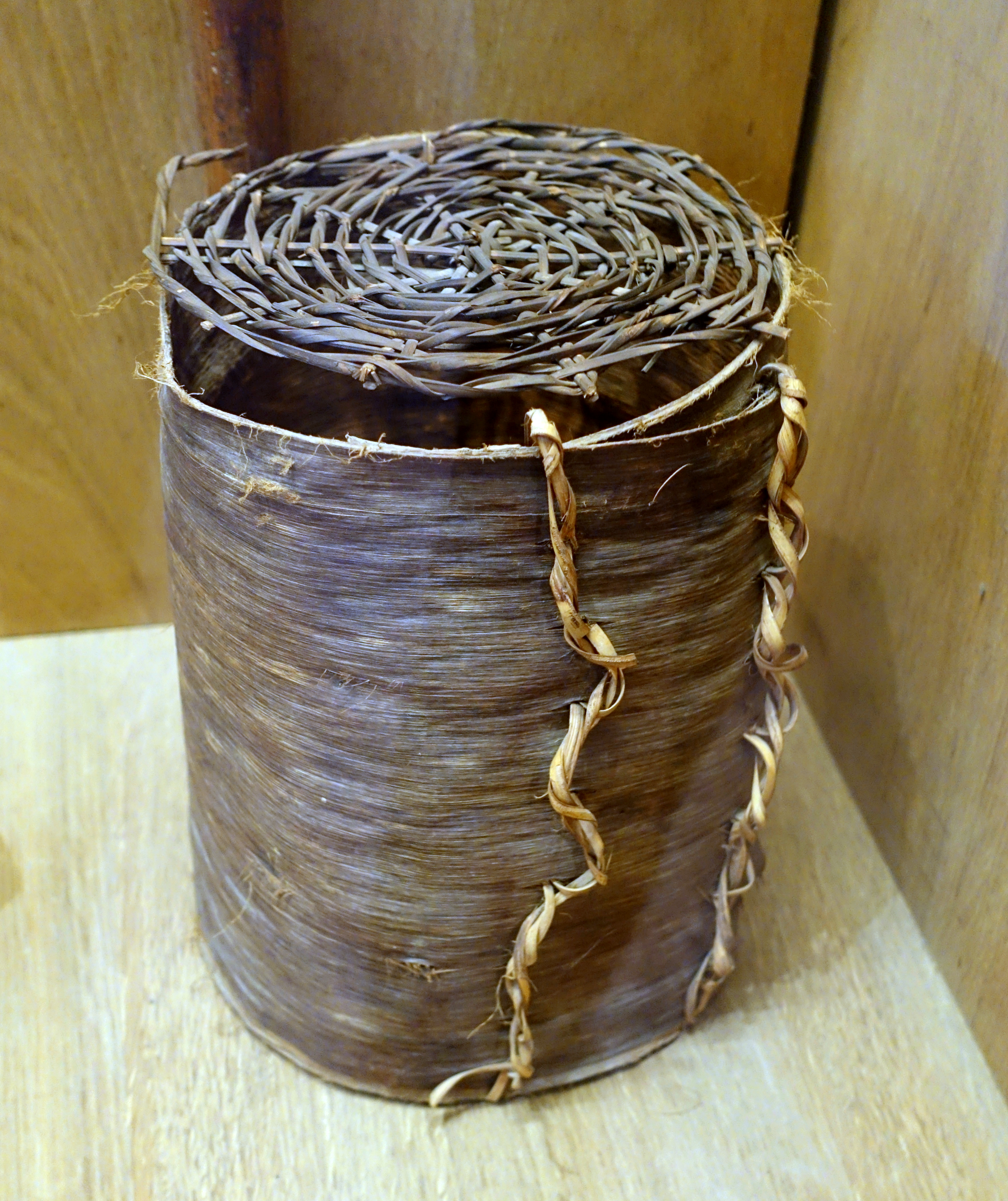

Total population
- Vietnam 7,513 (2019)

Regions with significant populations
- Laos, Vietnam

Languages
- Chut • Vietnamese • Lao

Religion
- Animism

The Chut (Vietnamese: Người Chứt, Rục language: Cheut /rocky mountain) are a small ethnic group located in the Minh Hóa and Tuyên Hóa districts of Quảng Bình Province, in Vietnam's North Central Coast.

Chut is not a distinct group but a collective name for five different Vietic-speaking groups in Quảng Bình, namely the Arem, the Rục, the Maliêng/Mã Liêng, the Mày, and the Sách. In 1973, Vietnamese researchers decided to group these peoples into a new crafted ethnic group called Chứt. In accordance with the Resolution of the General Statistics Office of Vietnam, #121/TCTK/PPCD of March 2, 1979 List of ethnic groups in Vietnam, the Chut ethnonym was recognized at the state level as the common name for five groups (Arem, Mã Liêng, Mày, Rục, and Sách).

The Chut are one of the four main groups of Vietic speakers in Vietnam, the others being the Kinh, Muong, and Thổ. The nearby speakers of the Nguồn language are related to the Chut, but are classified by the Vietnamese government as Kinh.

A Rục woman was the subject of the 2025 documentary Hair, Paper, Water....

== Culture ==
Before 1954, the Chut were ignored by the colonial government. Traditionally, they were nomadic, living in temporary villages. However, they have now adopted a sedentary lifestyle. The name "Chut" refers to the cave and rock dwellings they once lived in. Originally, the Chut hunted small animals with crossbows and gathered fruit and fungi. They also use different traps to catch monkeys, civets, foxes, porcupines, birds and mice. Now, they grow rice, corn and tobacco, sowing the seeds with a stick. They also raise buffalo and cattle for plowing. Collective hunting is still done with dogs. When a large animal is caught, the hunter gets the back meat and the rest is divided equally among the others. They also catch fish using fishing rods, fishing nets and poisonous leaves. The Chut do not traditionally grow and weave cotton. In the past, traditional clothing was made from bark and consisted of simple loin-cloths and skirts, but now they wear modern clothing. Often, they barter with the Lao and Viet for goods such as farming equipment.

== Sub-groups ==
There are multiple sub-ethnic groups within the Chut designation including the Rục, Mày, Arem, Mã Liêng people, and Sách.

== Language ==
Chut sub-groups all speak the Chut language with dialects, except the Arem, which speaks the Arem language. Both languages are included in the Vietic branch of the Austroasiatic family.

== Geographic distribution ==
The population of Chứt people in Vietnam was 7,513 according to the 2019 census. They mostly live in Quảng Bình Province (6,572 people, comprising 87.5% of all Chứt in Vietnam).
