= Thổ people =

Thổ
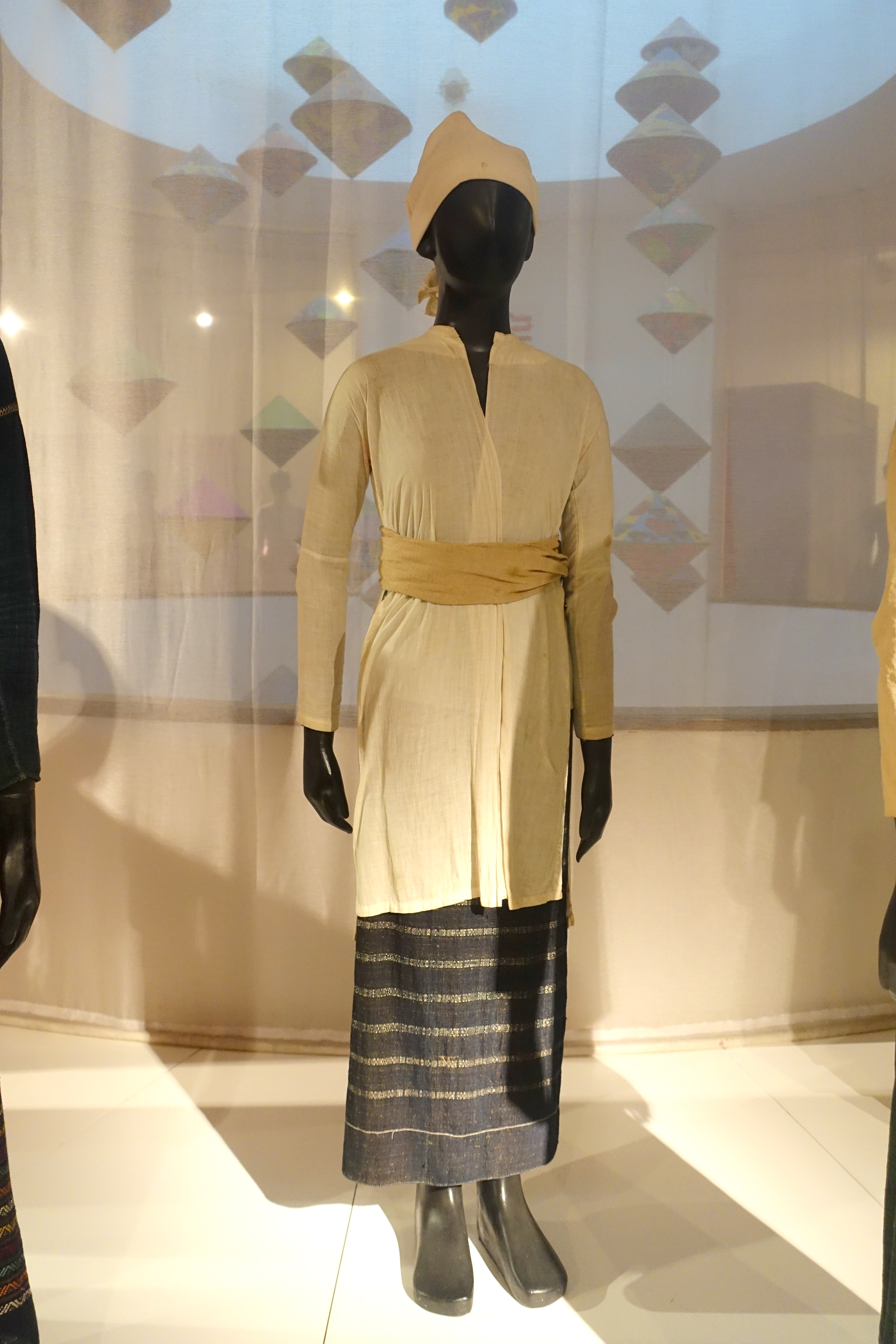
- Thổ clothing

Total population
- 91,430 (2019)

Regions with significant populations
- Vietnam (Nghệ An Province) Laos (Bolikhamsai Province and Khammouane Province)

Languages
- Tho • Vietic languages • Vietnamese • Lao

Religion
- Theravada Buddhism • Animism

The Thổ ethnic group (also Keo, Mon, Cuoi, Ho, Tay Poong) inhabits the mountainous regions of northern Vietnam, mainly Nghệ An Province southwest of Hanoi. Many Thổ speak the Tho language, which is closely related to Vietnamese. The Thổ population numbered 91,430 in 2019.

The Thổ are one of the 4 main groups of Vietic speakers in Vietnam, the others being the Việt, Mường, and Chứt. The name Thổ, which means "autochthonous", was originally applied to the Tày ethnic group, however this usage is obsolete.

== History ==
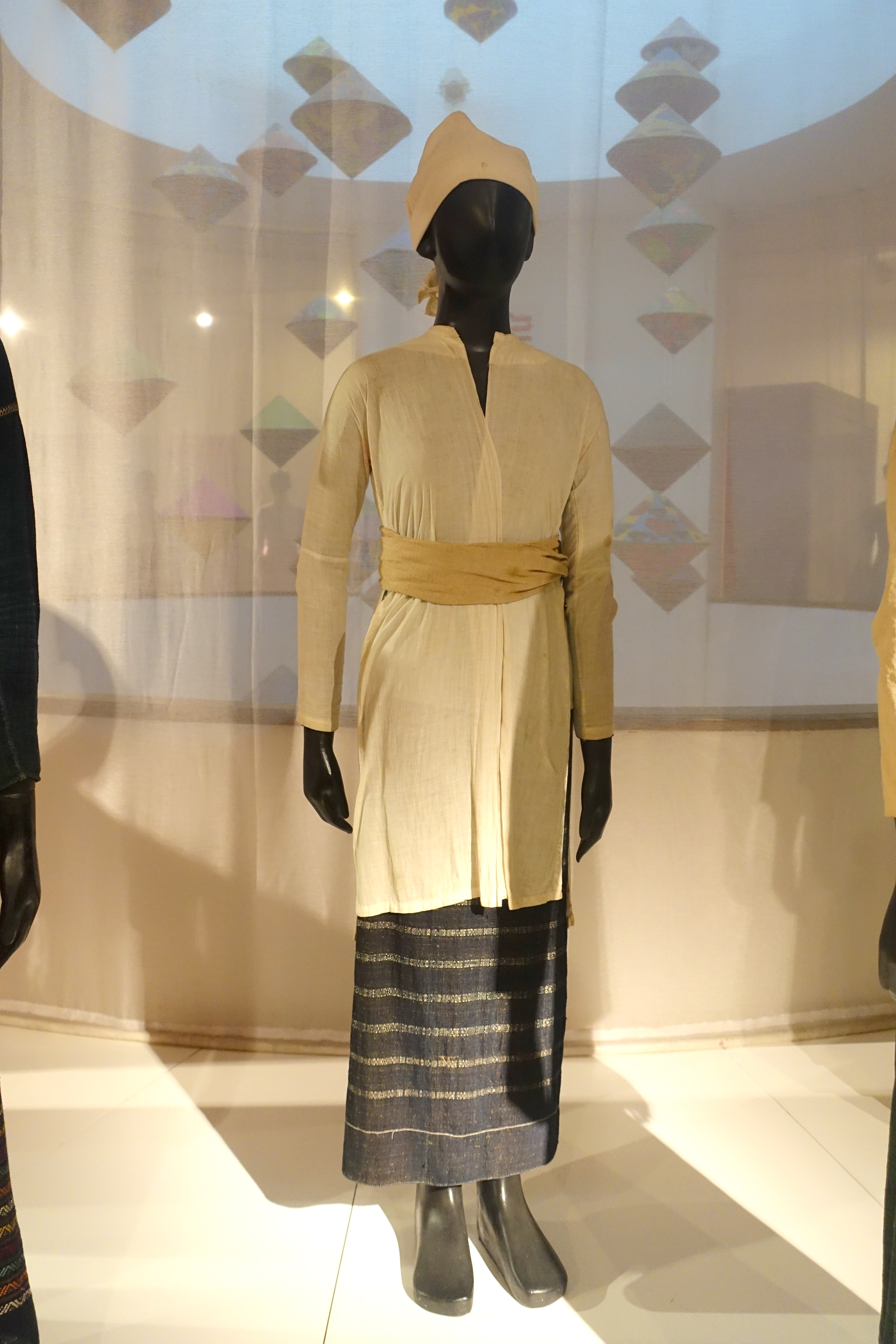
A traditional Tho dress

The Thổ people are a heterogeneous mix of different Vietic peoples. Around the end of the 17th century, Vietnam experienced multiple social upheavals that caused multiple migrations of Viet and Muong peoples into territory of other Vietic speaking ethnic minorities such as the Cuối and intermixed with the local populations. After a period of evolution, were given the name Thổ. Their culture combines elements of Viet and Muong culture, with elements of Thái culture. Their clothing is a mix of Vietnamese, Muong, and Tai traditions from the early modern period. Some women wear clothing similar to the Áo bà ba or the Áo tứ thân, but with a Sarong and a Kerchief. Men wear simple tunics and pants. Just like with the Muong, many clothing items are purchased from the Thái. They mainly grow rice and ramie, and use hemp to make bags, hammocks and nets. In the northern communes of Nghệ An, the stilt houses are identical to that of the Muong. In the South, however, they are in the Thái style.

== Subdivisions ==
Thổ consists of various different ethnolinguistic groups. Quán Vi Miên (2013:12) lists the following branches.

- Họ (Lao/Thai exonym for the Han Chinese)
- Kẹo (Keo) (Lao/Thai exonym for ethnic Kinh or Vietnamese)
- Mọn (Mol) (Mường autonym)
- Cuối
- Đan Lai
- Ly Hà
- Tày Poọng (Phoọng, Poọng, Phống) (Lao exonym for the "Khạ", or Mon-Khmer hill tribes)

== Languages ==
Thổ is a heterogeneous group; thus, local groups have distinct languages. However, all of Thổ languages belong to Vietic branch . Nguyễn Hữu Hoành (2009) classify Thổ languages into 5 groups base on their position in Vietic branch.

- Tày Poọng (Poong or Phong) and Đan Lai (Liha) - Lexicostatistical studies have found that Đan Lai and Poọng sharing 85% basic lexicon. Thus, Nguyễn (2009) identify them as dialects of a language. The speakers of this language reside mainly in Con Cuông and Tương Dương districts. It may also have close relation with Hung language (Toum) in Laos.
- Cuối, Nguyễn (2009) pointed out that Cuối is a distinct language with Vietnamese, Muong and Poọng-Đan Lai. This language have two dialects Cuối Chăm in Tân Hợp commune (Tân Kỳ district) and Cuối Nếp (or Cuối Làng Lỡ) in Thái Hòa town. Because of sharing 66% basic lexicon with Poọng, Nguyễn (2009) proposed to group Cuối with Tày Poọng-Đan Lai to form a subbranch in Vietic, parallel to Việt-Mường branch and Chứt branch.

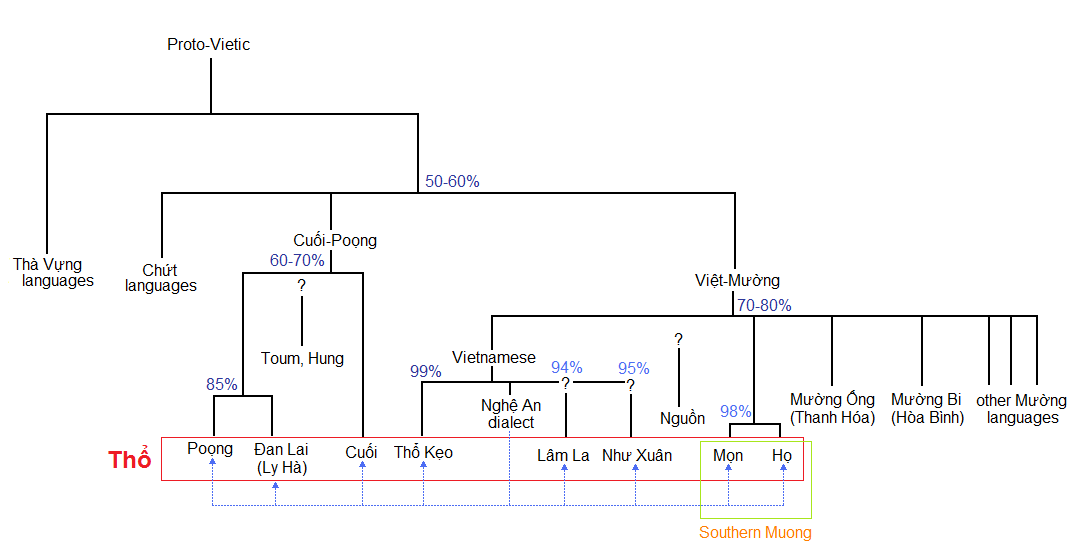
The position of Thổ languages in Vietic branch

- Mọn and Họ, The two dialects share 98% basic lexicon and have a closer relation with Mường languages than Cuối and Poọng. They share 77%, 79% and 71% core lexicon with Mường Bi language, Mường Ống language and Nghệ An dialect of Vietnamese, respectively. Especially, Mọn and Họ are lexical closest with a Mường language in Như Xuân district (84%). Therefore, Nguyễn (2009) group them into a single language in Việt-Mường branch which have a closer relation with Mường languages. Maspéro (1912) named this language as Southern Mường language
- Kẹo share 99% lexicon with Nghệ An dialect of Vietnamese. Thus, Nguyễn(2009) classified Kẹo as a dialect of Vietnamese or even a sub-dialect of Nghệ An dialect
- Thổ Lâm La and Thổ Như Xuân share respectively 94% and 95% basic lexicon with Nghệ An dialect. However, Nguyễn (2009) argued that two Thổ languages experienced a different phonological innovation with Vietnamese. Thus, he placed it into a grey area between being dialects of Vietnamese or being member languages of Viet-Muong branch (Nguồn has a similar status).

== Distribution ==
As of 2009, 80% (59,579 persons) of all ethnic Thổ live in Nghệ An Province, while 13% (9,652 persons) are found in Thanh Hóa Province Quán Vi Miên (2013:11).

Quán Vi Miên (2013:12-13) lists ethnic Thổ populations and branches (ethnic subdivisions) for the following districts of Nghệ An Province.

- Quỳ Hợp District: 18,394 people; Họ, Kẹo, Mọn branches, in the following communes:
  - Tam Hợp (5,515 ethnic Thổ)
  - Nghĩa Xuân (3,855 ethnic Thổ)
  - Minh Hợp (1,983 ethnic Thổ)
  - Hạ Sơn (2,652 ethnic Thổ)
  - Văn Lợi (2,403 ethnic Thổ)
  - Thọ Hợp (1,730 ethnic Thổ)
  - Quỳ Hợp city (265 ethnic Thổ)
- Nghĩa Đàn District: 28,487 people; Họ, Kẹo, Mọn, Cuối Đếp branches
- Tân Kỳ District: 15,695 people; Họ, Kẹo, Mọn, Cuối Chăm branches
- Con Cuông District: 3,220 people; Đan Lai, Ly Hà branches
- Tương Dương District: 436 people; Tày Poọng branch

== See also ==
- List of ethnic groups in Vietnam
