= Tho =

Tho or THO may refer to:

== Languages ==
- Cuối language
- Tày language
- Khmer language

== People ==
- Thổ people, of northern Vietnam
- Jeff Tho (born 1988), Australian badminton player
- Lê Đức Thọ (1911–1990), Vietnamese revolutionary general

== Places ==
- T'ho, an ancient Mayan city
- Þórshöfn Airport, Iceland (IATA:THO)

== Other uses ==
- Tricolour (political movement) (Czech: Trikolóra hnutí občanů), Czech Republic
