= Bo people =

Bo people may refer to:

- Bo people (Andaman), a recently extinct group that spoke the Aka-Bo language
- Bo people (China), an almost extinct minority population in Southern China
- Bo people (Laos), ethnic group in Laos, speaking Bo language
