= Themarou people =

Ethnic group in Laos

Thémarou
Total population
- 47 (2019)

Regions with significant populations
- Nakai District, Khammouane Province, Laos

Languages
- Thémarou

Religion
- Shamanism

The Thémarou is a tiny and little-known Vietic ethnic group of Laos, indigenous of the Nakai-Nam Theun National Park. Themarou people live in the upper Nam Theun River. Their current population is 47 (2019 census). Like many Vietic type I groups, the Themarou are in very endangered and critical livelihoods, caused by the effect of NT2 Project's relocation program for indigenous peoples.

Like the Atel and the Mlengbrou, the Themarou have a special relationship with the dholes (an Asiatic wild dog) and the crows, however they only prefer to interact with the black and yellow varieties of the dholes, and collect meat killed by these dholes.
