= Pakatan =

Pakatan may refer to:

- The Pakatan Rakyat, an informal Malaysian political coalition that began in 2008 and was dissolved in 2015
- The Pakatan Harapan, the Malaysian political coalition that succeeded the Pakatan Rakyat
- Maleng language, also known as Pakatan Language, a language of Laos and Vietnam
