= Tai Pao language =

Tai language of Vietnam and Laos

Tai Pao
- Tai Hang Tong
- "Tai Pao" written in Lai Pao script
- Native to: Vietnam
- Native speakers: (ca. 13,000 cited 1995 census – 2002)
- Language family: Kra–Dai: Tai; Northern; Tai Pao
- Writing system: Lai Pao script

Language codes
- ISO 639-3: tpo
- Glottolog: taih1245

Tai Pao, known in Vietnamese sources as Tai Hang Tong (Hàng Tổng), is a Tai language of Vietnam and Laos. In Laos, it is spoken in Khamkeut District, Pakkading District, and Viengthong District of Bolikhamxai Province. Two dialects of Tai Hang Tong are distinguished: Tai Pao and Tai Yo.

== Lai Pao script ==
The Tai Hang Tong in Tương Dương, Nghệ An Province preserve a unique script called Lai Pao or Lai Paw. Since 2006, the preservation of Lai Pao script was made possible by conservation works of Michel Ferlus.
