= Arem =

Arem may refer to:

- Arem people
- The Arem language
- Arem, the final boss from Ys IV: The Dawn of Ys
- Arem-arem, an Indonesian-Javanese snack
