= Arem language =

Language

Arem
- Cmbrau
- Pronunciation: [cmrawˀ]
- Native to: Laos, Vietnam
- Ethnicity: Arem
- Native speakers: 7 (2021)
- Language family: Austroasiatic: Vietic; Chut ?; Arem

Language codes
- ISO 639-3: aem
- Glottolog: arem1240
- ELP: Arem
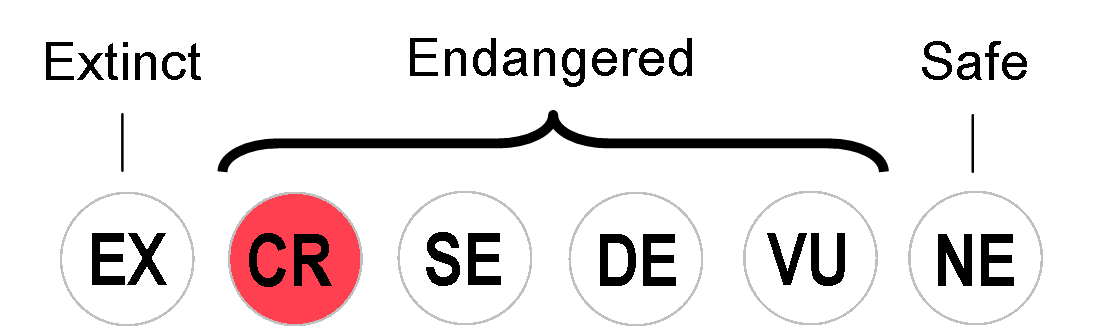
- Arem is classified as Critically Endangered by the UNESCO Atlas of the World's Languages in Danger.

The Arem language (Cmbrau [cmrawˀ]) is an endangered language spoken by the Arem people in a small area on both sides of the Laos–Vietnam border. It belongs to the Vietic branch of the Austroasiatic language family. Specifically, it is a member of the Chut language group, which is one of the six Vietic languages. This language is considered critically endangered by UNESCO. Like other Vietic languages, the Arem language makes use of a tonal or phonational system that is unique to Vietic languages. Like many southern Vietic Languages, the Arem language also makes use of pre-syllables or sesquisyllables within the language.

Arem has glottalized final consonants like Thavung language.

== Names ==
Arem is an ethnographic term to describe a group of indigenous people that reside on the border of Southern Vietnam and Laos. The people prefer to call themselves Cmbrau [cmrawˀ]. However, because this is the only attested [cm-] sesquisyllabic structure in the language, it is theorized that this may also be an ethnographic term that was borrowed from another nearby language.

Another name for the Arem is Umo, which literally means 'cave' or 'grotto'.

== History and demographics ==
The Arem people were only known to exist by local populations of Vietnam until 1959, when they were discovered by the Vietnamese military. Previously, the local authorities had thought them members of the local Bru khùa community. The Arem population was only 53 people in 1960: 30 men and 23 women. The most recent survey of the area in 1999 indicated that there were 102 Arem people. Of these 102 Arem people, only around 25% of the population was estimated to be using the Arem language on a consistent basis. All speakers of the Arem language are bilingual speakers of Vietnamese and some are also fluent in Khùa and/or Lao as well.

In Vietnam, Arem is spoken in Bản Ban and in Tân Trạch communities. In Tân Trạch, Arem is spoken in village no. 39, which also has Ma[ng] Coong people, who are a Bru–Van Kieu subgroup. As a result, Ma Coong is the most widely spoken in the village. As of 2015, there were only about 20 speakers of Arem remaining.

== Phonology ==
=== Syllabic structure ===
The Arem language makes use of both monosyllabic words and sesquisyllabic words. It is estimated that 55–60% of the Arem language consists of sesquisyllabic words. This is much higher than the majority of other Vietic languages that typically utilize sesquisyllables in only 35-40% of their lexicon, if the particular language contains any sesquisyllables at all.

=== Suprasegmentals ===
Arem's vowel inventory is split into two series of voice-type registers. Series 2 is characterized by a low-breathy register phonation. In syllables ending in voiced finals (/∅, w j l m n ɲ ŋ/), this register involves a contrast between a low-breathy modal tone and a glottalized tone marked by a weak glottal stop. Syllables ending in /-h/ produce a tone corresponding to the Vietnamese huyền, while those checked by voiceless stops (/-p -t -c -k/) yield low-pitch outcomes corresponding to the tone nặng. This registral opposition is the result of vowel splitting in two series from a single proto-vowel.

Series 1 is characterized by a high-clear register phonation. Within syllables containing voiced finals, this series maintains a contrast between a high, clear, unmarked tone and a high, glottalized, slightly raising tone. Clear vowels in syllables ending in /-h/ correspond to the Vietnamese tone hỏi. In checked syllables ending in voiceless stops, vowels of this series yield high-pitch outcomes corresponding to the Vietnamese tone sắc.

The combination of the contrast between clear and breathy phonation with glottalization in unchecked syllables forms the four-tone system, per Ferlus (2014).

Tone mark	Contour	Context	Example
a	high, clear	unchecked	atʰiəl "fish scale"
aˀ	slightly raising	checked	akiəlˀ "on side"
à	low breathy	unchecked	cìəl "cast net"
àˀ	low breathy glottalized	checked	patìəlˀ "middle"

Ta (2025) disputes Ferlus that Arem laryngeal finals have never been dropped which contra to real tonogenesis found in Ruc and Vietnamese. The f_{0} variations appear too shifting among speakers, indicating that the pitch contrast is phonetic (allophonic) rather than structurally phonemic (lexical), which in sum shows that Arem is a non-tonal, register language.

=== Vowels ===
==== Breathy ====
Breathy vowels
	Front		Central		Back	
	short	long	short	long	short	long
Close	ì	(ìː)	ɨ̀	ɨ̀ː	ù	ùː
Mid	è	(èː)	(ə̀)	ə̀ː	ò	òː
Near-open			ɐ̀	ɐ̀ː		
Diphthongs	[ìe]		[ɨ̀ə]		[ùo]	

==== Clear ====
Clear vowels
	Front		Central		Back	
	short	long	short	long	short	long
Close	i	(iː)	ɨ	ɨː	u	uː
Near-close	ɪ	ɪː	ʉ	ʉː	ʊ	ʊː
Mid	(e)	eː	ə	əː	o	oː
Open-mid	ɛ	ɛː	ʌ	ʌː	ɔ	ɔː
Near-open	æ	æː	(ɐ)	ɐː		
Open			a	aː	ɑ	ɑː
Diphthongs	[ie]		[ɨə]		[uo]	

=== Consonants ===
==== Initials ====
Initial consonants
		Bilabial	Alveolar	Post- alveolar	Palatal	Velar	Glottal
Nasal		m	n		ɲ	ŋ	
Plosive/ Affricate	voiceless	p	t	t͡ʃ	c	k	ʔ
Plosive/ Affricate	prenasalized	ᵐp	ⁿt	ⁿt͡ʃ	ᶮc	ᵑk	ᵑʔ
Plosive/ Affricate	aspirated	pʰ	tʰ			kʰ	
Plosive/ Affricate	prenasalized		ⁿtʰ				
Plosive/ Affricate	implosive	ɓ	ɗ		ʄ		
Plosive/ Affricate	prenasalized	ᵐɓ	ⁿɗ		ᶮʄ		
Fricative	voiceless		s	ʃ			h
Fricative	voiced	v	(z)	(ʒ)	(ʑ)		
Fricative	prenasalized	ⁿv					ᵑh
Lateral			l				
Trill			r (ⁿr)				
Approximant					j (ᶮj)		

==== Codas ====
Codas
	Bilabial	Alveolar	Palatal	Velar	Glottal
Nasal	m(ˀ)	n(ˀ)	ɲ(ˀ)	ŋ(ˀ)	
Plosive	p	t	c	k	Ø(ˀ)
Fricative					h
Lateral		l(ˀ)			
Approximant	w(ˀ)		j(ˀ)		

== Notes and references ==
=== Bibliography ===
- Enfield, N.J.; Diffloth, Gérard (2009). "Phonology and sketch grammar of Kri, a Vietic language of Laos" (PDF). Cahiers de Linguistique Asie Orientale. 38 (1): 3–69. doi:10.1163/1960602809x00063. hdl:11858/00-001M-0000-0013-4111-0. (see note on talk page)
- Ferlus, Michel (2014). "Arem, a Vietic Language". In Migliazza, Brian; Sidwell, Paul (eds.). Papers from the 5th International Conference on Austroasiatic Linguistics (Canberra, September 4-5, 2013). Mahidol University (Thailand). pp. 1–15.
- Ferlus, Michel. 2014. Arem, a Vietic Language. Mon-Khmer Studies 43.1:1-15 (ICAAL5 special issue).
