= Chut languages =

Austroasiatic language cluster of Vietnam and Laos

Chut
- Ruc-Sach
- Geographic distribution: Vietnam, Laos
- Native speakers: 1,300 (2007)
- Linguistic classification: Austroasiatic: Vietic; Chut
- Subdivisions: Rục; Sách; Mày; Maleng; ? Kata

Language codes
- ISO 639-3: scb
- Glottolog: chut1247

The Chứt (Chut, Cheut) or Rục-Sách languages are a Vietic language cluster spoken by the Chứt peoples of Vietnam and Khammouane Province, Laos.

== Classification ==
The following three Chứt subgroups have been tentatively identified in Babaev & Samarina (2021).

- Mày, Rục, Sách
- Arem
- Kri, Maleng (Malieng); Kri and Maleng are listed as Western Vietic, rather than as part of the Chut phylogenetic group, by Alves & Sidwell (2021)

Except for the semi-nomadic and sedentary agriculturalist Sach and the swidden agriculturalist Kri, the May, Ruc, Arem, and Maleng were all hunter-gatherers until the late 20th century.

== Distribution ==
Chứt languages are spoken in the following villages in Vietnam.

Sách

- Lâm Hóa
- Hóa Tiến
- Lâm Sum
- Hóa Hợp
- Hóa Lương
- Thượng Hóa

Mày

- Ca Oóc
- Bai Dinh
- Cha Lo

Rục

- Yên Hợp
- Phú Minh
