= Sách people =

Ethnic group in Vietnam

Sách
Total population
- 2655 (2009)

Regions with significant populations
- Minh Hóa District, Tuyên Hóa District and Bố Trạch District, Quảng Bình province, Vietnam

Languages
- Sách, Vietnamese

Religion
- Animism, Shamanism, Mahayana Buddhism, Christianity

Related ethnic groups
- Rục, Arem, Mày

The Sách is a Vietic ethnic group of Vietnam, native people of the mountains of Central Vietnamese province of Quảng Bình. The exonym Sách might have originated during the 15th century from the Sino-Vietnamese name for "register," which pre-modern Vietnamese texts used the term to designate villages that inhabited by various Austronesian and Austroasiatic highlanders. On the other hand, according to Michel Ferlus, the name's meaning may have relation with uncertain ancient Chinese terminologies. In Vietnam, they are considered a sub-ethnic group of the Chứt.

Perhaps so, among the Chuet tribes, the Sách have been exposed to classical Sinitic civilization of the Vietnamese in the downstream plains, and they had been studied by French scholars and ethnologists since the early 20th century. The Sách primarily practice Vietnamese-influenced Mahayana Buddhism and Vietnamese customs. Cadiere (1905) suggested that among the Sach as well as the Nguon may be descendants of the insertion of Muong soldiers from Thanh Hoa that being sent to the region in the 17th century to quell off rebellion.

Today, the Sách reside in three mountainous districts of Minh Hóa, Tuyên Hóa and Bố Trạch, Quảng Bình province, Central Vietnam.
