= Ruc language =

Austroasiatic language of Vietnam

Ruc
- Rục
- Native to: Vietnam
- Ethnicity: Ruc
- Language family: Austroasiatic: Vietic; Chut; Ruc

Language codes
- ISO 639-3: –
- Glottolog: rucc1239
- ELP: Ruc

Rục is a Vietic language spoken by the Ruc people of Tuyên Hóa district, Quảng Bình province, Vietnam. Rục literally means 'underground spring', and is a critically endangered language spoken by a small ethnic group that practiced a hunter-gatherer lifestyle until the late 20th century.

== History ==
Ruc speakers were hunter-gatherers until the late 1970s, when they were relocated into sedentary villages by the Vietnamese government. The 1985 Soviet-Vietnamese Linguistic Expedition found that there were no more than 200 Ruc people. Half of the Ruc died from a cholera epidemic in the late 1980s. Today, the Ruc live together with the Sach in villages close to the Laotian border. Ruc settlements include Yên Hợp and Phú Minh.

== Phonology ==
Unlike Vietnamese, Rục allows for presyllables with a minor vowel, such as cakuː^{4} 'bear' (cf. Vietnamese gấu). Rục is notable for preserving many prefixes that have been lost in Vietnamese, including prefixes (such as *k.-) in archaic Chinese loanwords that are crucial for the reconstruction of Old Chinese.

=== Consonants ===
==== Initials ====
Ruc initials
| | | Bilabial | Dental- Alveolar | Retroflex | Palatal | Velar | Glottal |
|---|---|---|---|---|---|---|---|
| Plosive | voiceless | p | t̪ | ʈ | c | k | ʔ |
| Plosive | aspirated | pʰ | tʰ | | | kʰ | |
| Plosive | implosive | ɓ | ɗ | | ʄ | | |
| Fricative | voiceless | f | s̪ | ʂ | | | h |
| Fricative | voiced | v | | | | | |
| Nasal | | m | n | | ɲ | ŋ | |
| Lateral | | | l | | | | |
| Rhotic | | | r | | | | |
| Approximant | | w | | | j | | |

==== Codas ====
Ruc codas
| | Bilabial | Alveolar | Palatal | Velar | Glottal |
|---|---|---|---|---|---|
| Plosive | p | t | c | k | ʔ |
| Fricative | | s | | | h |
| Nasal | m | n | ɲ | ŋ | |
| Lateral | | l | | | |
| Rhotic | | r | | | |
| Approximant | w | | j | | |

=== Vowels ===
Ruc vowels
| | | Front | Central | Back |
|---|---|---|---|---|
| Close | long | iː | ɯː | uː |
| Close | short | i | | u |
| Close-mid | long | eː | ɤː | oː |
| Close-mid | short | | ɤ | o |
| Middle | long | ɛː | | ɔː |
| Middle | short | ɛ | | ɔ |
| Open | long | | aː | |
| Open | short | | a | |
| Diphthongs | | [iə] | [ɯə] | [uə] |

=== Suprasegmentals (tones) ===
Rục has a hybrid tone system in which tone and register coexist. It has four tones A1, A2, B1, B2 grouped into two rising and two falling categories, distinguished mainly by f0, phonation type, and vowel quality. However, the preservation of the historical laryngeal final, which shows register cues but no f0 contrast in tone C1 and tone C2, indicates that register remains an independent contrast, placing Rục in an intermediate stage between register systems and fully tonal systems. Below is the table showing pitch value of Ruc tonal variations.

Ruc tones
| Tone number | Pitch value |
|---|---|
| A1 | 53 |
| A2 | 32 |
| B1 | 34 |
| B2 | 31 |
| C1 | 44 |
| C2 | 44 |

== Morphosyntax ==
Ruc is an isolating language with no inflection used in verbs and nouns at all, and a general drift towards analytic grammar is evident. In terms of derivational morphology, Ruc retains several forms of affixations that have been lost in other Vietic languages like Vietnamese, but their semantics are largely eroded. The transformation of archaic Vietic morphosyntax like Ruc from an Austroasiatic inflectional form to a newer analytical one is currently happening irreversibly and accelerating, with some Vietic languages having already finished the process.

Under intense interactions with speakers of other more analytic languages such as Vietnamese and Lao, in the future, Ruc's older form of morphology may have been lost and replaced with a new one as seen in many Mainland Southeast Asian languages with affixes being less syntactically functional or no longer used.

=== Case ===
There are few recognizable cases in Ruc and they only utilize prefixes. The dative prefix pa- of Ruc has been cited by some linguists as supporting evidence for the Austric languages hypothesis.

| Case | Marker | Example | Function |
|---|---|---|---|
| Dative | pa- | mi³¹ ‘you’ pami³¹ ‘(to) you’ (obj.) | indirect object |
| Locative | a- | cu:⁴pa¹ ‘we’ acu:⁴pa¹ ‘(on) us’ | mark on pronouns |
| Subject | ʔa- | ʔaj¹ ‘who’ ʔaʔaj¹ ‘as for/on one/whom’ | mark on interrogative pronouns |

=== Syntax ===
Like other Vietic languages, Ruc shares similar characteristics: SVO structure, head-initial noun phrase structure, topic-comment. However, Ruc syntax will slightly differ with Vietnamese in cases of Ruc verbs that causative affixes are used.

=== Morphology ===
In word formation, Ruc and archaic Vietic languages can employ three strategies: compounding, reduplication, and derivational affixation, though Vietic affixation in general is nonproductive and much of it appears fossilized.

==== Compounding ====
Ruc compounding is similar to those seen in other Austroasiatic languages:

Noun-Verb: ɲa:² (house) + jo:n¹ (tall) → ɲa:² jo:n¹ ‘house on stilts’

Verb-Noun: pɯə² (suitable) + kudəl¹ (stomach) → pɯə² kudəl¹ ‘to be satisfied’

Verb-Verb: ti² (go) + luh¹ (exit) → ti² luh¹ ‘to exit’

Verb-Verb/Adjective: khik³ (healthy) + kitəɲ³ (young) → khik3 kitəɲ3 ‘robust’

Approx. 16% of Ruc words are compounds while 84% are simple words according to a 1996 analysed corpus data.

==== Reduplication ====
Like other Vietic languages, reduplication in Ruc can be either full reduplication (monomorphemic words) or segment alternation (with polymorphemic roots). For examples,

pu35 (‘to suckle’) → pu³⁵ pu³⁵ (‘to be suckling’)

lɛɲ¹ (‘up’) → lɛɲ¹ lɤaw⁴ (‘agile’)

kərɓeːŋ → kərɓeːŋ¹ kərɓiːt² (‘to hang about’)

==== Derivational affixation ====
Affixation in Ruc creates lexicalized forms of words utilizing prefixes and infixes, while suffixes are almost lacking.

The causative prefix pa- and infix -a- turn an intransitive verb into a transitive verb. For examples,

(a) kun⁴ (‘afraid’) → pakun⁴ (‘threaten’)

kɯcit³ (‘to die’) → kacit³ (‘to kill’)

The causative resultative prefix pa- is a homonym:

rɯmɛk³ (‘cool’) → parɯmɛk³ (‘to cool (something)’)

The nominalizing infixes -n- and -r- make a noun from a verb:

tʰut (‘to stop up’) → tanut³ (‘stopper’)

səp³ (‘to cover’) → sanəp³ (‘a blanket’)

The quantifying prefix mu- turns numerals into measuring units.

hal¹ (‘two’) → muhal¹ (‘two-finger span’)

Ruc has historical traces of a stative prefix on a number of adjectives but their word roots have largely eroded, leaving disyllabic adjectives with unanalyzable prefixes.

== Vocabulary ==
In term of basic vocabulary, Ruc shares 52% with Vietnamese, 92% with May, 98% with Sach, and around 33~37% with Katuic languages. Ruc also has few loan words originated from Old Chinese, mostly in disyllabic form.
