= Nguồn language =

Vietic language spoken in Southeast Asia

Nguon
- Năm Nguyên; Thiếng Nguồn
- Pronunciation: /tʰjəŋ ŋwən/
- Native to: Vietnam, Laos
- Region: Quảng Bình Province
- Ethnicity: 2,000 (2007) to 40,000
- Native speakers: 2,000 (2007–2010)
- Language family: Austroasiatic: Vietic; Viet–Mường; Mường–Nguồn; Nguon
- Writing system: Latin (Chữ Quốc ngữ)

Language codes
- ISO 639-3: nuo
- Glottolog: nguo1239
- ELP: Nguôn
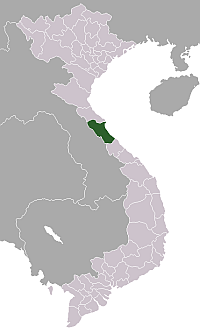
- Location of Quảng Bình Province

Nguồn (also Năm Nguyên) is a Vietic language spoken by the Nguồn people in the Trường Sơn mountains in Vietnam's North Central Coast region as well as in nearby regions of Laos.

Most Nguồn speakers in Vietnam live in the secluded Minh Hóa district of Quảng Bình Province, with others in the area around Đồng Lê, the seat of Tuyên Hoá District, approximately 50 km (31 mi) from the National Highway 1.

The Nguồn language has been variously described as a dialect of Vietnamese or as the southernmost dialect of Mường. Some researchers who consider it more closely related to Mường find that those who connect it more closely with Vietnamese are more influenced by ethnographic and/or political concerns than linguistic evidence. Chamberlain (2003) and Sidwell (2009) count it as a third Viet–Muong language.

== Geographic location ==
Most Nguồn live in Tuyên Hóa District (alongside the neighboring Sách people, a subgroup of the Chứt people who also speak a Vietic language) and in Minh Hoá District (living with the neighboring Việt peoples).

There are also Nguồn living in Laos, but with conflicting reports as to their exact location. According to Chamberlain (1998), there is a Nguồn village in central Laos known as Ban Pak Phanang in Boualapha District, Khammouane Province.

== Genealogical relations ==
Chéon (1907), Maspéro (1912), and Cuisinier (1948) considered Nguồn to be more closely related to Mường while Mạc (1964), Nguyễn Đ. B. (1975), and Phạm (1975) connected it with Vietnamese.

Later linguistic comparison by Nguyễn V. T. (1975) and Nguyễn Ph. Ph. (1996) suggest a closer link with the Mường dialects, and this is echoed by Barker (1993) (and others).

Jerold A. Edmondson, Kenneth J. Gregerson, and Nguyen Van Loi mention that this language is of "great interest to those studying the history of Vietic languages" due to its distinct historical developments.

Nguyễn V. T. (1975) notes that Nguồn speakers can communicate with Mường speakers with each speaking their own language, but Vietnamese speakers who do not know Mường cannot understand Nguồn.

Although closer to Mường generally (especially concerning sound system similarities), in some aspects Nguồn is more similar to Vietnamese. For example, the negative marker in Vietnamese is the particle không, which is ultimately a loanword from Chinese that became grammaticalized. The native negative marker chẳng, which is attested in earlier stages of Vietnamese, was largely replaced by the Chinese borrowing. Mường, in contrast, has preserved the original chẳng. Nguồn has, like Vietnamese, lost chẳng to không. In this feature of the loss of the native negative marker, Nguồn is like Vietnamese rather than Mường.

== Language variation ==
Nguyễn Ph. Ph. (1996) notes that there are two varieties of Nguồn:

- Cổ Liêm
- Yên Thọ (or An Thọ)

Cổ Liêm is named after the village of the same name; Yên Thọ is the name of a cooperative in Tân Hoá village.

The Yên Thọ variety is closer to Vietnamese than Cổ Liêm with respect to certain phonological developments.

== History ==
In 1905, Cadière reported that the Nguồn (as well as the Sách people) were to be found in valleys of the Nguồn Năn river in eleven villages. Originally there were two groups of five villages. The northern group was in Cơ Sa canton (along with some Việt villages) and consisted of the following villages:

- Qui Đạt
- An Đức
- Ba Nương
- Thanh Long
- Tân Kiều

Tân Kiều was later split into two villages resulting in a sixth village in the northern group:

- Tân Hợp

The more southerly village group consisted of

- Kổ Liêm
- Bốk Thọ
- Kim Bãng
- Tân Lí
- An Lạk

Mạc (1964) and Nguyễn Đ. B. (1975) assert that Nguồn is an original Việt group from the area of the Hà Tĩnh and Nghệ An provinces who moved into their present territory by the 17th century. Evidence for this opinion is based on family records. Mạc (1964) also reports that most Nguồn declared themselves to be Việt on the 1960 census.

Nguyễn V. T. (1975) suggests that the Mường could have migrated further south than Nghệ An to as far as Quảng Bình. Although some Việt families may have migrated to this region, they may have done so after Mường groups had already been established in the area. These Việt migrants could, then, have assimilated in language to the Mường. This Mường variety also would have been in contact with Chứt languages, like Sách. Thus, Nguyễn V. T. (1975) suggests that Nguồn is a variety of Mường spoken by Mường (possibly Hà Tĩnh Mường) and assimilated Việt people with influences from Chứt languages.

== Bibliography ==
- Barker, Miriam A. (1993). Bibliography of Mường and other Vietic language groups, with notes. Mon-Khmer Studies, 23, 197–243. (Online version: sealang.net/archives/mks/BARKERMiriam.htm).
- Cadière, Léopold. (1902). Coutumes populaires de la vallée du Nguồn Sơn. Bulletin de l'École Française d'Extrême Orient, 2, 352–386.
- Cadière, Léopold. (1905). Les hautes vallées du sông Gianh. Bulletin de l'École Française d'Extrême Orient, 5, 349–367.
- Chamberlain, James R. (2003) Eco-Spatial History: a nomad myth from the Annamites and its Relevance for Biodiversity Conversation. In Landscapes of Diversity: indigenous knowledge, sustainable livelihoods and resource governance in Montane Mainland Southeast Asia., edited by X. Jianchu and S. Mikesell: Kunming Yunnan Science and Technology Press.
- Cuisinier, Jeanne. (1948). Les Mường: Géographie humaine et sociologie. Paris: Institut d'Ethnologie.
- Mạc, Đường. (1964). Các dân tộc miền núi miền Bẳc Trung Bộ [The minority groups of Northern Central Vietnam]. Hanoi: Nhà x.b. Khoa học Xã hội.
- Nguyễn, Dương Bình. (1975). Về thành phần dân tộc của người Nguồn [On the ethnic composition of the Nguon people]. In Viện Dân Tộc Học, Về vấn đề xác định thành phần các dân tộc thiểu số ở miền bắc Việt Nam (pp. 472–491). Hanoi: Nhà x.b. Khoa học Xã hội.
- Nguyễn Khắc Tụng (1975). "Góp phần tim hiểu thành phần tộc người của người Nguồn qua những nhận xét về nhà ở của họ". In, Ủy ban khoa học xã hội Việt Nam: Viện dân tộc học. Về vấn đề xác định thánh phần các dân tộc thiểu số ở miền bắc Việt Nam, 492–499. Hà Nội: Nhà xuất bản khoa học xã hội.
- Nguyễn, Phú Phong. (1996). The Nguồn language of Quảng Bình, Vietnam. Mon-Khmer Studies, 26, 179–190. (Online version: sealang.net/archives/mks/NGUYNPhPhong.htm).
- Nguyễn, Văn Tài. (1975). Tiếng Nguồn, một phương tiếng Việt hay một phương ngôn của tiếng Mường? Ngôn Ngữ, 4, 8–16. (Translated into English as Nguyễn V. T. 1993).
- Nguyễn, Văn Tài. (1993). Nguồn: A dialect of Vietnamese or a dialect of Mường? (Based on local data). M. A. Barker (Transl.). Mon-Khmer Studies, 22, 231–244. (Online version: sealang.net/archives/mks/NGUYNVnTi.htm).
- Pham, Đức Đương. (1975). Về mối quan hệ thân thuộc giữa các ngôn ngữ thuộc nhóm Việt-Mường miền Tây tỉnh Quảng Bình [On the close relationship between the languages in the Viet–Muong group in western Quảng Bình Province]. In Viện Dân Tộc Học, Về vấn đề xác định thành phần các dân tộc thiểu số ở miền bắc Việt Nam (pp. 500–517). Hanoi: Nhà x.b. Khoa học Xã hội.
- Sidwell, Paul. (2009) Classifying the Austroasiatic languages: history and state of the art. Lincom Europa.
- Viện Dân Tộc Học [Ethnology Institute]. (1975). Về vấn đề xác định thành phần các dân tộc thiểu số ở miền bắc Việt Nam [On the problem of defining the social position of the minority groups in northern Vietnam]. Hanoi: Nhà x.b. Khoa học Xã hội.
