= Viengthong district, Bolikhamsai =

Coordinates: 18.3917°N 104.4752°E

Viengthong district ເມືອງວຽງທອງ
- District
- Location of Viengthong district in Laos
- Country: Laos
- Province: Bolikhamsai
- Time zone: UTC+7 (ICT)

Viengthong district is a district (muang) of Bolikhamsai province in central Laos.

== See also ==
- Ban Nam Yang
- Ban Pho Kham
- Ban Chom Thong
- Ban Phon Du
- Ban Kok kham
- Ban Thad Phu Wiang
- Ban Na suang
- Ban Hin Ngon
- Ban Udom Site
- Ban Wang Hin
