= Nakai district =

District in Khammouane, Laos

Nakai district ມືອງນາກາຍ
- District
- Country: Laos
- Province: Khammouane
- Time zone: UTC+7 (ICT)

Nakai is a district (muang) of Khammouane province in mid-Laos. Nakai-Nam Theun National Park is in Nakai District; its headquarters is in Oudomsouk Village.
