= Cuối language =

Austroasiatic language spoken in Southeast Asia

Cuói
- Thổ
- Native to: Vietnam, Laos
- Ethnicity: Thổ
- Native speakers: (71,000 cited 1999 census)
- Language family: Austroasiatic: Vietic; Cuói
- Dialects: Cuối Chăm; Làng Lỡ

Language codes
- ISO 639-3: Either: tou – Tho hnu – Hung
- Glottolog: cuoi1242
- Linguasphere: 46-EAD-a

Cuối, also known as Thổ, is a dialect cluster spoken by around 70,000 people in Vietnam. It is also spoken by a couple thousand people in Laos—mainly in the provinces of Bolikhamsai and Khammouane.

== Phonology ==
=== Làng Lỡ dialect ===
==== Consonants ====
The consonant inventory of the Làng Lỡ dialect, as cited by Michel Ferlus:

Initial consonants of Cuối Làng Lỡ
		Bilabial	Labiodental	Alveolar	Retroflex	Palatal	Velar	Glottal
Nasal		m		n		ɲ	ŋ	
Plosive	tenuis	p		t	ʈ	c	k	ʔ
Plosive	glottalized	ɓ		ɗ		ˀɟ		
Plosive	aspirated			tʰ			kʰ	
Fricative	voiceless	f		s	ʂ			h
Fricative	voiced	β	v	ð			ɣ	
Fricative	glottalized			ˀð				
Approximant				l	ɽ ~ ʐ	j		

- [ʈ] is found in Vietnamese loanwords with initial /ʈ/ (orthographic ⟨tr⟩)
- [β ð ɣ ˀð] originate in the borrowing of segments from a variety of Vietnamese that existed several centuries ago.

==== Vowels ====
Monophthongs of Cuối Làng Lỡ
	Front	Central	Back
Close	i	ɨ	u
Close-mid/ Mid	e	ə	o
Open-mid/ Open	ɛ	ʌ̆ ă a	ɔ

Diphthongs of Cuối Làng Lỡ	iə	ɨə	uə	eə	oə

==== Tones ====
There are eight tones in the Làng Lỡ. Tones 1 to 6 are found on sonorant-final syllables (a.k.a. 'live' syllables): syllables ending in a vowel, semi-vowel or nasal. Tones 7 and 8 are found on obstruent-final syllables (a.k.a. 'stopped' syllables), ending in -p -t -c -k. This is a system comparable to that of Vietnamese.

== Vocabulary ==
The data is from Cuoi Cham vocabulary recordings and the Mon-Khmer Etymological Dictionary.

English	Cuối Chăm	Làng Lỡ	Hanoian Vietnamese	
cloud	mʌl¹	mʌn¹	məj˧˧	mây
rain	mɐː²	mɨə¹	mɨə˧˧	mưa
wind	sɒː³	juə³	zɔ˧˦	gió
thunder	kʰrʌm⁴	ʂəm⁴	səm˧˦	sấm
earth, land	tʌt⁷	tʌt⁷	ʔɗət̚˧˦	đất
cave	haːŋ¹	haːŋ¹	haːŋ˧˧	hang
deep	kʰruː²	ʂuː²	səw˧˧	sâu
water	daːk⁷	daːk⁷	nɨək̚˧˦	nước
river	kʰrɔŋ¹	ʂɔːŋ¹	səwŋ͡m˧˧	sông
puddle	puŋ⁶	-	vʊwŋ͡m˦ˀ˥	vũng
mud	puːl²	vuːn²	ʔɓun˨˩	bùn
rock, stone	taː³	δaː³	ʔɗaː˧˦	đá
bark	pɒː⁵	ʂɔː⁵⁶	vɔ˧˩	vỏ
dog	cɒː³	cɔː³	t͡ɕɔ˧˦	chó
cultivated field	rɔːŋ²	ʂɔːŋ²	zuəŋ˧˨ʔ	ruộng
to go	tiː²	tiː²	ʔɗi˧˧	đi
to have	kɒː³	kɔː³	kɔ˧˦	có
