= Vietic languages =

Subgroup of the Austroasiatic language family

Vietic
- Geographic distribution: Mainland Southeast Asia
- Linguistic classification: Austroasiatic: Vietic
- Proto-language: Proto-Vietic
- Subdivisions: Viet–Muong; Cuoi; Thavung; Chutic

Language codes
- Glottolog: viet1250
- Vietic

The Vietic languages are a branch of the Austroasiatic language family, spoken by the Vietic peoples in Laos and Vietnam. The branch was once referred to by the terms Việt–Mường, Annamese–Muong, and Vietnamuong; the term Vietic was proposed by La Vaughn Hayes, who proposed to redefine Việt–Mường as referring to a sub-branch of Vietic containing only Vietnamese and Mường.

Many of the Vietic languages have tonal or phonational systems intermediate between that of Viet–Muong and other branches of Austroasiatic that have not had significant Chinese or Tai influence.

== Origins ==
The ancestor of the Vietic language is traditionally assumed to have been located in today's North Vietnam.

However, the origin of the Vietic languages remains a controversial topic among linguists. Another theory, based on linguistic diversity, locates the most probable homeland of the Vietic languages in modern-day Bolikhamsai Province and Khammouane Province in Laos as well as parts of Nghệ An Province and Quảng Bình Province in Vietnam. The time depth of the Vietic branch dates back at least 2,500 years to 2,000 years (Chamberlain 1998); 3,500 years (Peiros 2004); or around 3,000 years (Alves 2020). Even so, archaeogenetics demonstrated that before the Đông Sơn period, the South Red River Delta's inhabitants were predominantly Austroasiatic: genetic data from Phùng Nguyên culture's Mán Bạc burial site (dated 1,800 BC) have close proximity to modern Austroasiatic speakers such as the Mlabri and Lua from Thailand, the Nicobarese from India (Nicobar Islands), and the Khmer from Cambodia; meanwhile, "mixed genetics" from Đông Sơn culture's Núi Nấp site showed affinity to "Dai from China, Tai-Kadai speakers from South China, and Austroasiatic speakers from Vietnam, including the Kinh"; therefore, "[t]he likely spread of Vietic was southward from the RRD, not northward. Accounting for southern diversity will require alternative explanations."

=== Vietnamese ===
The Vietnamese language was identified as Austroasiatic in the mid-nineteenth century, and there is now strong evidence for this classification. Modern Vietnamese has lost many Proto-Austroasiatic phonological and morphological features. Vietnamese also has large stocks of borrowed Chinese vocabulary. However, there continues to be resistance to the idea that Vietnamese could be more closely related to Khmer than to Chinese or Tai languages among Vietnamese nationalists. The vast majority of scholars attribute typological similarities with Sinitic and Tai to language contact rather than to common inheritance.

Chamberlain (1998) argues that the Red River Delta region was originally Tai-speaking and became Vietnamese-speaking only between the seventh and ninth centuries AD as a result of emigration from the south, i.e., modern Central Vietnam, where the highly distinctive and conservative North-Central Vietnamese dialects are spoken today. Therefore, the region of origin of Vietnamese (and the earlier Viet–Muong) was well north of the Red River.

On the other hand, Ferlus (2009) showed that the inventions of pestle, oar and a pan to cook sticky rice, which is the main characteristic of the Đông Sơn culture, correspond to the creation of new lexicons for these inventions in Northern Vietic (Việt–Mường) and Central Vietic (Cuoi-Toum). The new vocabularies of these inventions were proven to be derivatives from original verbs rather than borrowed lexical items. The current distribution of Northern Vietic also corresponds to the area of Dong Son culture. Thus, Ferlus concludes that the New today Northern Vietic (Viet-Muong) is the direct heir of the Dongsonian, who had resided in the southern part of the Red River Delta and North Central Vietnam from the 1st millennium BC.

Furthermore, John Phan (2013, 2016) argues that “Annamese Middle Chinese” was spoken in the Red River Valley and was then later absorbed into the coexisting Proto-Viet-Muong, one of whose divergent dialects evolved into the Vietnamese language. Annamese Middle Chinese belonged to a Middle Chinese dialect continuum in southwestern China that eventually "diversified into" Waxiang Chinese, the Jiudu patois (九都土話) of Hezhou, Southern Pinghua, and various Xiang Chinese dialects (e.g., Xiangxiang, Luxi, Qidong, and Quanzhou). Phan (2013) lists three major types of Sino-Vietnamese borrowings, which were borrowed during different eras:

- Early Sino-Vietnamese (Han dynasty (ca. 1st century CE) and Jin dynasty (ca. 4th century CE) layers)
- Late Sino-Vietnamese (Tang dynasty)
- Recent Sino-Vietnamese (Ming dynasty and post-Ming dynasty)

== Distribution ==
Geographic distribution of the Vietic languages

Vietic speakers reside in and around the Nakai–Nam Theun Conservation Area of Laos and north-central Vietnam (Chamberlain 1998). Many of these speakers are referred to as Mường, Nhà Làng, and Nguồn. Chamberlain (1998) lists current locations in Laos for the following Vietic peoples. An overview based on first-hand fieldwork has been proposed by Michel Ferlus.

- Nguồn: Ban Pak Phanang, Boualapha District, Khammouane; others in Vietnam
- Liha, Phong (Cham), and Toum: Khamkeut District; probably originally from the northern Nghe An / Khamkeut border area
- Ahoe: originally lived in Na Tane Subdistrict of Nakai District, and Ban Na Va village in Khamkeut District; taken to Hinboun District during the war, and then later resettled in Nakai Tay (39 households) and in Sop Hia (20 households) on the Nakai Plateau.
- Thaveung (Ahao and Ahlao dialects): several villages near Lak Xao; probably originally from the Na Heuang area
- Cheut: Ban Na Phao and Tha Sang, Boualapha District; others probably also in Pha Song, Vang Nyao, Takaa; originally from Hin Nam No and Vietnam
- Atel: Tha Meuang on the Nam Sot (primarily Malang people); originally from the Houay Kanil area
- Thémarou: Vang Chang on the Nam Theun; Ban Soek near the Nam Noy
- Makang: Na Kadok, Khamkeut District (primarily Saek people); originally from the Upper Sot area
- Malang: Tha Meuang on the Nam Sot
- "Salang": Ban Xe Neua, Boualapha District
- Atop: Na Thone, Khamkeut District (primarily Tai Theng people); originally from the Upper Sot area
- Mlengbrou: near the Nam One; later relocated to the Yommalath District side of the Ak Mountain, and now living in Ban Sang, Yommalath District (primarily Yooy people)
- Kri: Ban Maka

In Vietnam, some Vietic hill-tribe peoples, including the Arem, Rục, Maliêng, and Mày (Cươi), were resettled at Cu Nhái (located either in western Quảng Bình Province or in the southwest of Hương Khê District in Hà Tĩnh Province). The Sách are also found in Vietnam.

The following table lists the lifestyles of various Vietic-speaking ethnic groups. Unlike the neighboring Tai ethnic groups, many Vietic groups are not paddy agriculturalists.

Cultural typology of Vietic-speaking ethnic groups
Lifestyle	Vietic group
Small-group foraging nomads	Atel, Thémarou, Mlengbrou, (Cheut?)
Originally collectors and traders who have become emergent swidden sedentists	Arao, Maleng, Malang, Makang, Tơe, Ahoe, Phóng
Swidden cultivators who move every 2–3 years among pre-existing village sites	Kri
Combined swidden and paddy sedentists	Ahao, Ahlao, Liha, Phong (Cham), Toum

== Languages ==
The discovery that Vietnamese was a Mon–Khmer language, and that its tones were a regular reflection of non-tonal features in the rest of the family, is considered a milestone in the development of historical linguistics. Vietic languages show a typological range from a Chinese or Tai typology to a typical Mon-Khmer Austroasiatic typology, including (a) complex tonal systems, complex phonation systems or blends; (b) C(glide)VC or CCVC syllable templates; monosyllabic or polysyllabic and isolating or agglutinative typology.

- Arem: This language lacks the breathy phonation common to most Vietic languages, but does have glottalized final consonants.
- Cuôi: Hung in Laos, and Thô in Vietnam
- Aheu (Thavung): This language makes a four-way distinction between clear and breathy phonation combined with glottalized final consonants. This is very similar to the situation in the Pearic languages in which, however, the glottalization is in the vowel.
- Ruc, Sach, May, and Chưt: A dialect cluster; the register system is the four-way contrast of Aheu augmented with pitch.
- Maleng (Bo, Pakatan): Tones as in Ruc-Sach.
- Pong, Hung, Tum, Khong-Kheng
- Việt–Mường: Vietnamese and Mường. These two dialect chains share 75% of their basic vocabulary, and have similar systems of 5–6 contour tones. These are regular reflexes of other Vietic languages: The three low and three high tones correspond to voiced and voiceless initial consonants in the ancestral language; these then split depending on the original final consonants: Level tones correspond to open syllables or final nasal consonants; high rising and low falling tones correspond to final stops, which have since disappeared; dipping tones to final fricatives, which have also disappeared; and glottalized tones to final glottalized consonants, which have deglottalized.

== Classification ==
=== Sidwell & Alves (2021) ===
Sidwell & Alves (2021) propose the following classification of the Vietic languages, which was first proposed in Sidwell (2021). Below, the most divergent (basal) branches listed first. Vietic is split into two primary branches, Western (corresponding to the Thavung–Malieng branch) and Eastern (all of the non-Thavung–Malieng languages).

- Vietic
  - Thavung–Malieng (Western Vietic): Kri, Maleng, Malieng; Ahao/Ahlao, Thavung
  - Eastern Vietic
    - Chut: Arem; Sach, Ruc, May
    - Phong–Liha (Pong–Toum): Phong, Toum, Liha
    - Cuoi–Tho: Cuoi, Tho
    - Viet–Muong: Vietnamese, Muong, Nguon

The Thavung-Malieng group retains the most archaic lexicon and phonological features, while the Chut group merges *-r and *-l finals to *-l, along with the other northern languages.

Sidwell & Alves (2021) propose that the Vietic languages had dispersed from the Red River Delta, based on evidence from loanwords from early Sinitic and extensive Tai-Vietic contact possibly dating back to the Dong Son period.

=== Chamberlain (2018) ===
Chamberlain (2018:9) uses the term Kri-Mol to refer to the Vietic languages, and considers there to be two primary splits, namely Mol-Toum and Nrong-Theun. Chamberlain (2018:12) provides the following phylogenetic classification for the Vietic languages.

- Kri-Mol
  - Mol-Toum
    - Việt-Mường
      - Vietnamese
      - Mường, Nguồn
    - Toum-Ruc
      - Toum, Phong, Liha
      - Ruc, Chứt, May, Sach, Malieng
  - Nrong-Theun
    - Kri-Phoong
      - Kri, Phoong
      - Mlengbrou
    - Ahlao-Atel
      - Ahoe-Ahlao
        - Ahoe
        - Ahlao, Ahao
      - Atel-Maleng
        - Thémarou
        - Atel, Atop, (Makang), Arao, Maleng, Malang, To-e (Pakatan)

=== Sidwell (2015) ===
Based on comparative studies by Ferlus (1982, 1992, 1997, 2001) and new studies in Muong languages by Phan (2012), Sidwell (2015) pointed out that Muong is a paraphyletic taxon and subgroups with Vietnamese. Sidwell's (2015) proposed internal classification for the Vietic languages is as follows.

- Vietic
  - Viet-Muong: Vietnamese, Mường Muốt, Mường Nàbái, Mường Chỏi, etc.
  - Pong-Toum: Đan Lai, Hung, Toum, Cuôi, etc.
  - Chut
    - East: Mãliềng, Maleng, Arem, Kri, Chứt (Mày, Rụt, Sách, Mụ Già), etc.
    - West: Thavung, Pakatan, etc.

=== Chamberlain (2003) ===
The following classification of the Vietic languages is from Chamberlain (2003:422), as quoted in Sidwell (2009:145). Unlike past classifications, there is a sixth "South" branch that includes Kri, a newly described language.

- Vietic
  - North (Viet–Muong)
    - Vietnamese
    - Mường (according to Phan (2012), Mường is paraphyletic)
    - Nguồn
  - Northwest (Cuoi)
  - West (Thavưng)
    - Ahoe
    - Ahao
    - Ahlao
  - Southeast (Chut)
    - Cheut
    - Rục
    - Sách
    - Mày
    - Malieng
    - (Arem ?)
    - (Kata)
  - Southwest (Maleng)
    - Atel
    - Thémarou
    - Arao
    - Makang
    - Malang
    - Maleng
    - Tơe
  - South (Kri)
    - Kri
    - Phóng
    - Mlengbrou

== Animal cycle names ==
Michel Ferlus (1992, 2013) notes that the 12-year animal cycle (zodiac) names in the Khmer calendar, from which Thai animal cycle names are also derived, and were borrowed from a phonologically conservative form of Viet-Muong. Ferlus contends that the animal cycle names were borrowed from a Viet-Muong (Northern Vietic) language rather than from a Southern Vietic language, since the vowel in the Old Khmer name for "snake" /m.saɲ/ corresponds to Viet-Muong /a/ rather than to Southern Vietic /i/.

Animal	Thai name	Khmer IPA	Modern Khmer	Angkorian Khmer	Old Khmer	Proto-Viet-Muong	Vietnamese	Mường	Pong	Kari
鼠 Rat	Chuat (ชวด)	cuːt	jūt (ជូត)	ɟuot	ɟuot	*ɟuot	chuột	chuột (Note: squirrel) /cuot⁸/	-	-
牛 Ox	Chalu (ฉลู)	cʰlou	chlūv (ឆ្លូវ)	caluu	c.luː	*c.luː	trâu	tlu /tluː¹/ (Note: /klu:¹/ in Ferlus)	kluː¹	săluː²
虎 Tiger	Khan (ขาล)	kʰaːl	khāl (ខាល)	kʰaal	kʰa:l	*k.haːlˀ	khái (Note: Nghệ An dialect)	khảl /kʰaːl³/	kʰaːl³	-
兔 Rabbit	Thɔ (เถาะ)	tʰɑh	thoḥ (ថោះ)	tʰɔh	tʰɔh	*tʰɔh	thỏ	thó /tʰɔː⁵/	tʰɔː³	-
龍 Dragon	Marong (มะโรง)	roːŋ	roṅ (រោង)	marooŋ	m.roːŋ	*m.roːŋ	rồng	rồng /roːŋ²/	-	roːŋ¹
蛇 Snake	Maseng (มะเส็ง)	mə̆saɲ	msāñ' (ម្សាញ់)	masaɲ	m.saɲ	*m.səɲˀ	rắn	thẳnh /tʰaɲ³/ (Note: Hòa Bình dialect; Sơn La /saŋ³/ in Ferlus)	siŋ³	-
馬 Horse	Mamia (มะเมีย)	mə̆miː	mamī (មមី)	mamia	m.ŋɨa	*m.ŋǝːˀ	ngựa	ngữa /ŋɨa⁴/	-	măŋəː⁴
羊 Goat	Mamɛɛ (มะแม)	mə̆mɛː	mamæ (មមែ)	mamɛɛ	m.ɓɛː	*m.ɓɛːˀ	dê (Note: from Proto-Vietic *-teː, not from the same root as other words)	bẻ /ɓɛ:³/	-	-
猴 Monkey	Wɔɔk (วอก)	vɔːk	vak (វក)	vɔɔk	vɔːk	*vɔːk	voọc (Note: Nghệ-Tĩnh dialectal; old nucleus /*ɔː/ would have become diphthong /uə/ (spelt "-uô-") in other dialects, e.g. Huế ruộng /ʐuəŋ˨˩ʔ/ vs. Nghệ-Tĩnh roọng /ʐɔːŋ˨˨/, both from Proto-Vietic *rɔːŋʔ 'paddy field')	voọc /vɔːk⁸/	vɔːk⁸	-
雞 Rooster	Rakaa (ระกา)	rə̆kaː	rakā (រកា)	rakaa	r.kaː	*r.kaː	gà	ca /kaː¹/	kaː¹	kaː¹
狗 Dog	Jɔɔ (จอ)	cɑː	ca (ច)	cɔɔ	cɔː	*ʔ.cɔːˀ	chó	chỏ /cɔː³/	cɔː³	cɔː³
豬 Pig	Kun (กุน)	kao/kol	kur (កុរ)	kur	kur	*kuːrˀ	cúi (Note: archaic; still found in the compound-noun cá cúi 'pig-fish')	củi /kuːj³/	kuːl⁴	kuːl⁴
