= Sach language =

Austroasiatic language of Vietnam

Sach
- Sách
- Native to: Vietnam
- Ethnicity: Sach
- Language family: Austroasiatic: Vietic; Chut; Sach

Language codes
- ISO 639-3: –
- Glottolog: sach1240
- ELP: Sach

Sách is a Vietic language spoken by the Sách people of Quảng Bình province, Vietnam, where it is spoken in Minh Hóa, Tuyên Hóa, and Bố Trạch districts. Sách is the most widely spoken of the Chut languages and is more heavily influenced by Vietnamese than the other Chut languages.

Sách villages include Lâm Hóa, Hóa Tiến, Lâm Sum, Hóa Hợp, Hóa Lương, and Thượng Hóa.
