= Michel Ferlus =

French linguist (1935–2024)

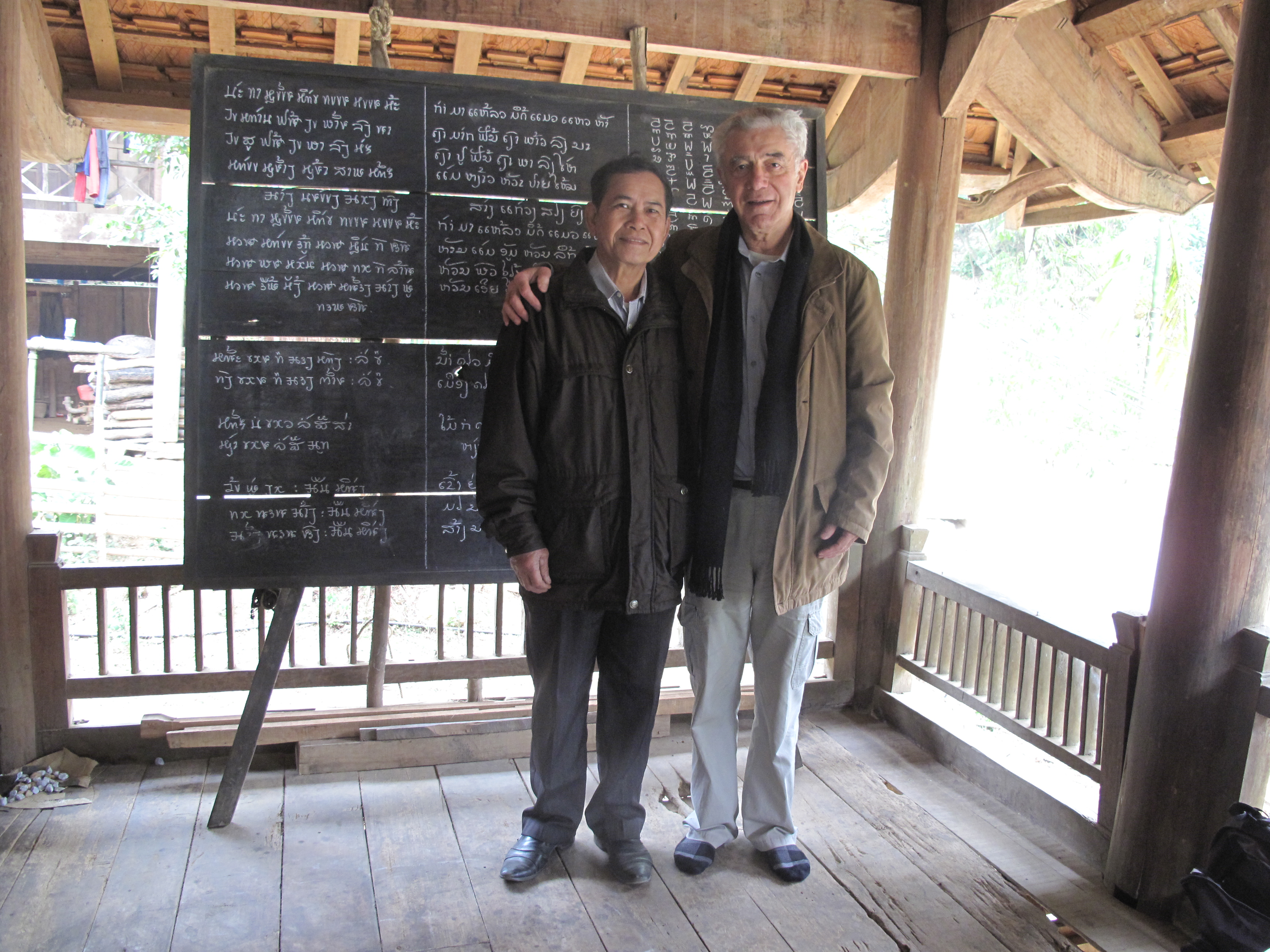
- Michel Ferlus with Vi Khăm Mun, a scholar of Tương Dương, Nghệ An, Vietnam, at Mr. Mun's home. Date: 01/2014.
- Born: 1935
- Died: 10 March 2024 (aged 88)
- Known for: Re-discovering the Lai Pao (Lai Paw) writing system, unique to Tai Pao of Tương Dương, Việt Nam; making seminal contributions to the historical phonology of Southeast Asian languages
- Scientific career
- Fields: historical phonology
- Workplaces: CNRS

Michel Ferlus (French: [miʃɛl fɛʁlys]; 1935 – 10 March 2024) was a French linguist who specialized in the historical phonology of languages of Southeast Asia. In addition to phonological systems, he also studied writing systems, in particular the evolution of Indic scripts in Southeast Asia.

== Biography ==
Michel Ferlus was born in 1935. He followed classes in ethnology and prehistory taught by André Leroi-Gourhan; in 'primitive religions' by Roger Bastide; in linguistics by André Martinet; and in Southeast Asian languages and history by George Cœdès. He worked in Laos as a teacher from 1961 to 1968. This allowed him to do fieldwork on languages of Laos, including Hmong and Yao (Hmong-Mien family), Khmu/Khamou and Lamet (Austroasiatic/Mon-Khmer), as well as Phu Noi/Phou-Noy (Sino-Tibetan). He became a researcher at Centre National de la Recherche Scientifique in 1968. He mainly did fieldwork in Thailand and Burma (Myanmar) in the 1980s, studying Wa, Lawa, Palaung, Mon and Nyah Kur; in Vietnam and Laos in the 1990s, studying Viet-Muong (also known as Vietic) languages, and the Tai languages and writing systems of northern and central areas of Vietnam, including the Lai Pao writing system of Vietnam, which was close to falling into oblivion.

He has published extensively about his findings on numerous languages of Laos, Thailand, Burma/Myanmar, and Vietnam, in journals such as Mon-Khmer Studies, Cahiers de Linguistique Asie Orientale, and Diachronica.

== Main findings ==
Michel Ferlus's main discoveries relate to the effects of monosyllabicization on the phonological structure of Southeast Asian languages. Tonogenesis (the development of lexical tones), registrogenesis (the development of lexically contrastive phonation-type registers), the evolution of vowel systems all partake in a general (panchronic) model of evolution. Phenomena such as the spirantization of medial obstruents, which resulted in a major historical change in the sound inventory of Vietnamese, are also part of the broad set of changes—originating in monosyllabicization—that swept through East/Southeast Asia.

== Selected publications ==
- Ferlus, Michel (1971). "La langue souei : mutations consonantiques et bipartition du système vocalique". Bulletin de la Société de Linguistique de Paris. 66 (1): 378–388.
- Ferlus, Michel (1982). "Spirantisation des obstruantes médiales et formation du système consonantique du vietnamien". Cahiers de Linguistique Asie Orientale. 11 (1): 83–106. doi:10.3406/clao.1982.1105.
- Ferlus, Michel (1992). "Essai de phonétique historique du khmer (du milieu du premier millénaire de notre ère à l'époque actuelle)". Mon-Khmer Studies. 21: 57–89.
- Ferlus, Michel (1996). "Remarques sur le consonantisme du proto kam-sui". Cahiers de Linguistique Asie Orientale. 25 (2): 235–278. doi:10.3406/clao.1996.1451.
- Ferlus, Michel (1997). "Problèmes de la formation du système vocalique du vietnamien". Cahiers de Linguistique Asie Orientale. 21 (1): 37–51. doi:10.3406/clao.1997.1504.
- Ferlus, Michel (1998). "Les systèmes de tons dans les langues viet-muong". Diachronica. 15 (1): 1–27.
- Ferlus, Michel (2004). "The origin of tones in Viet-Muong". Papers from the Eleventh Annual Conference of the Southeast Asian Linguistics Society 2001, ed. by Somsonge Burusphat. Eleventh Annual Conference of the Southeast Asian Linguistics Society 2001. Tempe, Arizona: Arizona State University Programme for Southeast Asian Studies Monograph Series Press. pp. 297–313.
- Ferlus, Michel (2009). "What were the four Divisions of Middle Chinese?". Diachronica. 26 (2): 184–213.
