= Phong language =

Vietic dialect cluster spoken in Vietnam

Phong
- Tày Poọng
- Native to: Vietnam
- Language family: Austroasiatic: Vietic; Phong–Liha; Phong

Language codes
- ISO 639-3: hnu
- Glottolog: phon1243
- ELP: Hung

Phong, Tai Phong, or Tày Poọng is a Vietic dialect cluster spoken in north-central Vietnam. Varieties include Đan Lai, Toum, and Liha.
