= Mày language =

Austroasiatic language of Vietnam

Mày
- Native to: Vietnam
- Ethnicity: May
- Native speakers: 600 (2013)
- Language family: Austroasiatic: Vietic; Chut; Mày

Language codes
- ISO 639-3: None (mis)
- Glottolog: mayy1239
- ELP: May

Mày is a Vietic language spoken by the May people of Minh Hóa district, Quảng Bình province, Central Vietnam. It is a member of the Cheut language cluster, which belongs to the Vietic branch of the Austroasiatic family. With only several hundred speakers, May is a critically endangered language, with only about half of the estimated ethnic population of 1,228 people able to speak the language.

== Distribution ==
May is spoken in the villages of Ca Oóc, Bai Dinh, and Cha Lo. The villages are located in Minh Hóa district, Quang Binh province (in the communities or xã of Dân Hóa (formerly Trung Hóa), Thượng Hóa, Hóa Tiến, and Hóa Thanh). Dân Hóa is the only monolingual May village, while the others are mixed with various other ethnic groups.

== Phonology ==
=== Consonants ===
==== Initials ====
May initials
			Labial	Alveolar	Retroflex	Alveopalatal	Palatal	Velar	Laryngeal
Obstruent	Occlusive	plain	p	t	ʈ		c	k	ʔ
Obstruent	Occlusive	aspirated	pʰ	tʰ				kʰ	
Obstruent	Implosive		ɓ	ɗ			ʄ		
Obstruent	Fricative	voiceless			ʂ	ɕ			h
Obstruent	Fricative	voiced	β			ʑ		(ɣ)	
Resonant		Nasal	m	n			ɲ	ŋ	
Resonant		lateral		l					
Resonant		trilled			ɽ				

- Among the onset fricatives, the phonemic status of voiced velar /ɣ/ is unclear since it is exclusively found in borrowed lexemes.
- Voiceless occlusives may undergo voicing and lenition in the phonetic syntagma after an open syllable: /k-/ → [ɣ], /t-/ → [z], /p-/ → [β].
- Voiceless occlusive onsets may become more voiced even if not in the absolute beginning position of the phonological word. Cf. ɴ̩kɯ̆ŋ¹ [ŋɣɯ̆ŋ¹] hɛk³ "datura, devil's trumpet".
- In the fortis position, the implosive onsets are heard as prenasalized [ᵐɓ-], [ⁿɗ-], and [ᶮʄ-]. Eg. ʄăm¹ [ᶮʄăm¹] "vegetables" with an interval of prenasalization of onset reaches 109 ms as recorded via Praat. Prenasalization may occur with preglottalization and insertion of a schwa overtone. Eg. ɓuəi̯⁴ [ᵐɓuəi̯⁴/ˀᵊᵐɓuəi̯⁴] "period, part of the day".
- Onsets /ʑ-/ and /ɕ-/ are characterized as having unstable places of articulation. Accordingly, /ʑ-/ may be heard as either an alveopalatal fricative [ʑ] or a palatal [j].
- Retroflex and alveopalatal fricative onsets tend to undergo affrication, both in monosyllabic and sesquisyllabic words:

/ɽ-/ → [ɖɽ]: ɽɔ̤c⁴ [ɖ͡ɽɔ̤ːc] "gut, instestine"; ɴ̩ɽi¹ [ɴ̩ɖɽiː] "pestle";
/ʂ-/ → [ʈ͡ʂ]: ʂɯ̆k³ [ʈʂɯ̆k] "strong";
/ɕ-/ → [t͡ɕ]: ɕik³ [t͡ɕiːk] "trace"; ɕɤ̆t³ [t͡ɕɤ̆t] "to more (not far)";
/ʑ-/ → [d͡ʑ]: ʑɔ̤l⁴ [d͡ʑɔːl] "to hang"; ɗok³ ʑa̤m² [d͡ʑa̤ːm] "sugarcane".

- Retroflex onset /ɽ-/ displays instability in phonetic realizations and can be heard as a voiced retroflex fricative [ʐ] or a voiced postalveolar fricative [ʒ].

==== Codas ====
May codas
	Labial	Alveolar	Retroflex	Palatal	Velar	Glottal
Plosive	p	t		c	k	ʔ
Fricative						h
Nasal	m	n		ɲ	ŋ	
Lateral		l				
Flap			ɽ			
Approximant				i̯ (~ i̯̥)	u̯	

- Voiced nasal codas m, n, ɲ, ŋ and voiceless obstruents -p, -t, -c, -k are actually checked or unreleased -m̚, -n̚, -ɲ̚, -ŋ̚, -p̚, -t̚, -c̚, -k̚.
- Nasal codas may be phonetically realized as either one of four variants: voiced (PT-1), voiceless (PT-2), voiced glottalized (PT-3), and voiceless glottalized (PT-4). The phonetic variations of nasal codas in May play no phonological role as prosodic types condition them.
- The existence/lack of laryngeal coda /-h/ affects the prosodic type of certain words, and there is a trend of dropping -h, which results in tone contour alternation. Eg. ʈɯh¹ ~ ʈɯ² "front, previously."
- Flap coda -ɽ is often realized as a devoiced flapped [ɽ̊] or a retroflex lateral [ɭ].

=== Vowels ===
May vowels (Babaev & Samarina 2021):

Vowels
		Front	Central	Back
Close	long	i	ɯ	u
Close	short	ǐ	ɯ̌	ǔ
Close-mid	long	e	ɤ	o
Close-mid	short	ě	ɤ̌	ǒ
Middle	long	ɛ		ɔ
Middle	short	ɛ̌		ɔ̌
Open	long		a	
Open	short		ǎ	
Diphthongs		[ie]	[ɯɤ]	[uo]

== Morphology ==
=== Pronouns ===
May pronouns often have shorter forms without ʔa. They are syntactically distinct. The full forms occupy the Subject/Agent role in transitive verb phrase that is located at the absolute beginning of the phrase and the direct object role after a transitive verb. The shorter forms are used to denote possessive constructions and pronominal dative/benefactive objects.

Personal pronouns
	Singular	Dual		Plural	General
	Singular	Exclusive	Inclusive	Exclusive	Inclusive
1st person	[ʔa]ho	[ʔa]ɲal	[ʔa]tɛ	[ta]pa, tupa	[ʔa]meŋ, [ʔa]miŋ
2nd person	[ʔa]mi	[ʔa]mal		pani	
3rd person	[ʔa]hăn	[ʔa]ɽɛ̤m		[ʔa]pa	

=== Word derivation and syntactic functions ===
May has a limited inventory of affixes and clitics. Some morpheme clitics may host multiple functions that could only be distinguished by context.

- Transitivizing pa-
- Nominalizing pV-, ʔa-, ʔu-, -Vn-, kV-, tV-, cV-
- Stativizing ta-
- Pluralizing pa=
- Singular mu=, m̤=, ma=
- Dative-Oblique pa=
- Negation ku=
- Imperative/Causative ci=

== Syntax ==
As an isolating language, May can only utilize word order and particles. The use of clitics and affixes is generally limited and does not undermine the analytical grammar structure. The basic word order of May is SVO. The basic word order in a verbal clause is S-V-P-OBL. Depending on speeches, the word order may undergo ellipsis in cases that the speech is comprehensive enough to the listener.

Pu1 ho1 [k]acit3 klu1
grandfather 1SG to.kill buffalo
"My grandfather killed buffalo."

Pʰaʝ li cɤ pa=ho hal poŋ päɽ ʔaliŋ kɤ̌i heh
must take BEN OBL=1SG two CLF flower top tree DIST
"Pick for me two flowers from that tree."
