= Mon-Khmer Studies =

Academic journal

- Discipline: Linguistics
- Language: English

Publication details
- History: 1964–2016
- Publisher: Mahidol University; SIL International

Standard abbreviations
- ISO 4: Mon-Khmer Stud.

Indexing
- ISSN: 0147-5207 (print); 2692-3637 (web)

Links
- Journal homepage

Mon-Khmer Studies was an academic journal that focused on Mon-Khmer languages. It was established in 1964 and ceased publication in 2016. From 1992 onwards, it was published by Mahidol University and SIL International.
