= Kri language =

Austroasiatic language of Laos and Vietnam

Kri
- Krìì, meengq Kri
- Native to: Laos or Vietnam
- Ethnicity: Kri
- Native speakers: 250 (2009)
- Language family: Austroasiatic: Vietic; Kri
- Dialects: Kri; Phóng; Mlengbrou

Language codes
- ISO 639-3: aem
- Glottolog: khap1242
- ELP: Kri
- Pong
- Kri is classified as Severely Endangered by the UNESCO Atlas of the World's Languages in Danger.

Kri (Krìì) is a Vietic language spoken by the Kri people of Laos and Vietnam.

== Names ==
Alternative names for Kri include Karii, K[a]ri-Phoong, Kha Phoong, Coi, and Salang.

== Distribution ==
Kri speakers live in the Upper Ñrong (Nam Noy) valley of Khammouane Province, Laos, as well as other locations within the Nakai-Nam Theun Biodiversity Conservation Area. It is mutually intelligible with Pròòngq, which is spoken in several villages downstream from the Kri (Enfield & Diffloth 2009).

Kri is spoken in the following villages of Laos and Vietnam.

- Khammouane province, Laos
  - Ban Thung/Thong
  - Ban Toong
  - Ban Poung
- Hà Tĩnh province, Vietnam
  - Phú Gia
  - Bản Giang

== Background ==
The Kri call themselves mleeng Kri, and their language meengq Kri. They are swidden cultivators who move every 2–3 years among pre-existing village sites (Chamberlain 1998). Houses are torn down after the death of a household member, and the housing materials are then used to construct a new house in a different location. Other than the Kri language, many adults, especially men, are also fluent in Vietnamese, Saek, Bru, and Lao.

Kri has been studied by the Russian-Vietnamese Linguistic Expedition in 2012.

== Phonology ==
=== Consonants ===
The consonants in Kri are:

Consonants
		Labial	Alveolar	Retroflex	Palatal	Velar	Glottal
Nasal		m	n		ɲ	ŋ	
Stop	implosive	ɓ	ɗ		ʄ		
Stop	tenuis	p	t	ʈʂ	c	k	ʔ
Stop	aspirated	pʰ	tʰ	ʈʂʰ		kʰ	
Fricative			s				h
Approximant		w	l	r~ʐ	j~ʝ	ɣ	

==== Finals ====
These are the consonants that may come at the end of a syllable in Kri:

	Bilabial	Alveolar	Palatal	Velar
Checked	[pˀ]	[tˀ]		[kˀ]
Nasal	[m]	[n]	[ɲ]	[ŋ]
Oral	[w]	[l] , [r]	[j]	Vowel

Do note that they are all contrastive, and that vowels, nasal consonants, and oral consonants may have checked endings. The Oral endings also may become voiceless.

=== Vowels ===
==== Short vowels ====
Short vowels
		Front	Central	Back
Non-low	Heavy	i	ɨ	u
Non-low	Light	ɪ	ə	o
Low	Heavy	è̤	a̤	ɔ
Low	Light	ɛ	a	ɑ

== Morphology ==
Kri has a few morphological features, less than Khmu but more than Vietnamese.

=== Causative Infix ===
The -a- infix may be inserted into words with two initial consonants, between them. This infix turns intransitive verb into a transitive verb, adding an agent. It can also turn a noun into a verb. Here are some examples:

- praang - to cross over
- paraang - to take someone across

- slôôj - to be washed away by running water
- salôôj - to discard into flowing water, to let something be washed away

- kleeh - to fall off
- kaleeh - to pick off

- blang - of the eyes, to become open (like a young dog's)
- balang - to open one's eyes

- ckaang - a hand span
- cakaang - to measure something by hand spans

=== Nominalising Infix ===
The -rn- infix is placed after a single initial consonant. This infix makes a noun from a verb:

- sat - to get one's foot stuck
- srnat - a foothold

- koq - to live
- krnoq - a house

This shortens to -r- when between consonants:

- kadôôlq - to rest the head on something
- krdôôlq - a pillow

=== Verbal Morphology ===
There are three forms of negation: dêêh, laa, and cùù. There have distinct syntactic behavior. Cùù occurs before the subject (e.g. sentence initially). Both dêêh and laa can occur before the verb (after the subject). Dêêh is distinct from laa in that dêêh can occur in responsive ellipsis environments (i.e. as a stand alone word after a questions).

There are a variety of TAM markers (which supply information about the tense, aspect, or mood) of predicates.

== Syntax ==
The basic word order of Kri is SVO, although argument ellipsis and fronting of constituents is common. Further, there is no case marking or cross-referencing agreement.

=== Verbal Domain ===
Serial verb constructions have an explicit marker of subordination (kùù).

=== Nominal Domain ===
Kri pronouns displays sensitivity to the three grammatical numbers in Kri (singular, dual and plural), as well inclusive/exclusive distinction, and (for the singular) a polite/bare distinctions. A gender distinction is made only in the third person polite forms. Polite forms are used when there is appropriate social distance (e.g. by age or kinship).

Personal Pronouns
		singular		dual	plural
		bare	polite	dual	plural
1st person	exclusive	teeq pàànq	koon	ñaar	caa
1st person	inclusive	teeq pàànq	koon	saa	cawq
2nd person		cak	mii	maar	prii
3rd person	feminine	hanq	mooq	qaar	paa
3rd person	masculine	hanq	qôông	qaar	paa

==== Classifiers ====
The classifier longq can be (but need not be) used to express possession. There are also numeral classifier constructions. These can be ordered Number-Classifier-Noun or Noun-Number-Classifier.
