= Liha language =

Northwest Vietic language

Liha
- Native to: Vietnam, Laos
- Ethnicity: 300 Liha (1999)
- Native speakers: (unknown cited 1999)
- Language family: Austroasiatic: Vietic; Phong–Liha; Liha

Language codes
- ISO 639-3: –
- Glottolog: lyha1238

Liha or Lyha is a Northwest Vietic language spoken in southwest of Nghe An province in Vietnam and a small trip of land in Bolikhamsai province, Laos, by a tribal group called Liha. Estimates in 1999 suggested that there were 300 Liha and unknown number of Liha speakers at the time.

== Overview ==
Liha has six contour tones.

Word list
Gloss	Liha
'beast/udder'	now
'nail/claw'	sam
'fat/grease/oil'	mə
'navel'	suːɲ
'night'	tɛːm
'earth/soil'	tɔt
'horn'	kʰlɔŋ
