= Nakai-Nam Theun National Park =

National park and protected wilderness area in Laos

- IUCN category II (national park)
- Location within Laos
- Location: Oudomsouk Village, Nakai District
- Coordinates: 17.9084°N 105.3125°E
- Area: 4,270 km^{2} (1,650 sq mi)
- Designated: 15 February 2019
- Administrator: Ministry of Agriculture and Forestry
- Website: www.nnt.gov.la

Nakai-Nam Theun National Park in Nakai District, Khammouane Province, Laos, is one of the last remaining wildernesses in Southeast Asia. Nakai-Nam Theun covers approximately 4,270 km^{2} of the Annamite Range and the adjacent Nakai Plateau in Khammouane and Bolikhamsai Provinces. It was designated a national park on 15 February 2019 by Prime Ministerial Decree No. 36, 15 February 2019. It is managed by the Ministry of Agriculture and Forestry (MAF). It is adjacent to the Vu Quang National Park of Vietnam.

The terrain of the park is rugged, and the crest of the Annamite Range runs along the eastern edge of the park on the border with Vietnam. Phou Laoko (2,286 meters elevation) is the highest peak in the park.

== Rivers ==
From north to south, riversheds in the park consist the following rivers:

- Nam Kata (eastern part only; the Nam Houay, on which the town of Na Kadok is located, is a tributary)
- Nam Xot
- Nam Mon
- Nam Theun
- Nam Noy
- Nam Pheo (a tributary of the Nam Noy)
- Nam One

All are tributaries of the Nam Theun to the southwest in the Nakai Plateau.

== Flora ==
A series of surveys conducted since 1994 by the co-operative programme of the Wildlife Conservation Society (WCS), the Lao Department of Forestry, and the International Union for Conservation of Nature (IUCN) have revealed that the area has a high biodiversity value. Semi-evergreen forest, deciduous dipterocarp forest and stands of pine are all found on the Nakai Plateau and in the Annamite foothills. Dry evergreen forest predominates on the slopes of the Annamites below 1800 meters elevation, with patches of Fokienia hodginsii forest, a commercially valuable cypress-like conifer, from 1,400 to 1,700 meters elevation. Wet evergreen upper montane fagaceous forests occur above 1,800 meters elevation, and include species of oak (Quercus), Castanopsis, and Lithocarpus. Above c. 2,000 m the fagaceous forest gives way to more stunted, rhododendron-dominated ericaceous cloud forest.

Species of plants listed as threatened by IUCN include conifer Cephalotaxus mannii. The only known population of Vietnamese White Pine in Laos is in Nakai-Nam Theun.

== Fauna ==
=== Mammals ===
Species of mammals, some discovered relatively recently, include the following:

- Saola
- Giant muntjac
- Roosevelt's muntjac
- Truong Son muntjac
- Indo-chinese warty pig
- Heude's pig
- Annamite striped rabbit
- Javan rhinoceros (Rhinoceros sondaicus annamiticus)
- Indochinese tiger
- Asian elephant

=== Birds ===
More than 400 bird species have been identified in Nakai-Nam Theun and the adjacent northern extension. This is by far the highest avian species richness of any site yet surveyed in Laos and is the highest recorded in a single protected area in Southeast Asia.

The park is home to Indochina's largest population of rufous-necked hornbill (Aceros nipalensis). Birds present in the park's upper montane forests include the threatened beautiful nuthatch (Sitta formosa), along with species characteristic of the wet evergreen rain forests on the eastern slope of the Annamites, like the Vietnamese crested argus (Rheinardia ocellata) and short-tailed scimitar babbler (Napothera danjoui).

== Languages ==
Many endangered Vietic languages are spoken in the Nakai-Nam Theun area. The Vietic peoples are the indigenous peoples of the Nakai-Nam Theun area, and have deep knowledge of the local ecology. The Saek language, which preserves many archaic phonological features not found in any other Tai language, is also spoken in the area, often alongside Vietic languages in the same villages. Saek speakers had lived in the area for about 300 years, and had originally come from Vietnam. Bru speakers had moved to the area in the 1800s and 1900s, and now make up the majority of the population. Lao and Vietnamese speakers, most of whom are recent migrants, are also found in the vicinity.

== See also ==
- Protected areas of Laos
- Nakai District
- Nam Theun
- Nam Theun 2 Dam
