= Register (phonology) =

Feature of some tonal languages

In phonology, a register, or pitch register, is a prosodic feature of syllables in certain languages in which tone, vowel phonation, glottalization or similar features depend upon one another.

It occurs in Bai, Burmese, Vietnamese, Wu Chinese and Zulu.

== Burmese ==
In Burmese, differences in tone correlate with vowel phonation and so neither exists independently. There are three registers in Burmese, which have traditionally been considered three of the four "tones". (The fourth is not actually a register but is a closed syllable, and is similar to the so-called "entering tone" in Middle Chinese phonetics.) Jones (1986) views the differences as "resulting from the intersection of both pitch registers and voice registers.... Clearly Burmese is not tonal in the same sense as such other languages and therefore requires a different concept, namely that of pitch register."

Burmese pitch-phonation registers
Register	Phonation	Length	Pitch	Example	Gloss
Low	Modal voice	long	low	လာ [làː]	'come'
High	Breathy voice	long	high; falling when final	လား [lá̤ː] ~ [lâ̤ː]	'mule'
Creaky	Creaky voice	medium	high	လ [lá̰ˀ]	'moon'
Checked	Final glottal stop	short	high	လတ် [lăʔ]	'fresh'

== Vietnamese ==
In Vietnamese, which has six tones, two tones are largely distinguished by phonation instead of pitch. Specifically, the ngã and sắc tones are both high rising but ngã is distinguished by the presence of a glottal stop in the middle of the vowel. The nặng and huyền tones are both pronounced as low falling, but distinguished primarily by nặng being short and pronounced with creaky voice, and huyền being noticeably longer and pronounced with breathy voice.

== Khmer ==
Khmer is sometimes considered to be a register language. It has also been called a restructured register language because both its pitch and its phonation can be considered allophonic. If they are ignored, the phonemic distinctions that they carry remain as differences in diphthongs and vowel length.

== Latvian ==
An example of a non-Asian language with register distinctions is Latvian, at least in the central dialects. Long vowels in stressed syllables are often said to take one of three pitch accents that are conventionally called rising, falling, and broken. However, the broken tone is distinguished not by pitch but by glottalization, and is similar to the ngã register of Northern Vietnamese.
