= Maleng language =

Austroasiatic language spoken in Laos and Vietnam

Maleng
- Pakatan
- Bo
- Native to: Laos, Vietnam
- Native speakers: (3,700 cited 2000–2007)
- Language family: Austroasiatic: Vietic; Chutic; Maleng
- Dialects: Atel; Thémarou; Arao; Makang; Malang; Maleng; Tơe

Language codes
- ISO 639-3: Either: pkt – Pakatan bgl – Bo
- Glottolog: male1282 Maleng bola1249 Bo-Maleng
- ELP: Maleng

Maleng (autonym: /malɛ̤ŋ²/), also known as Pakatan and Bo, is a Vietic language of Laos and Vietnam.

Maleng has the four-way register system of Thavung augmented with pitch.

Malieng, despite having the same name as Maleng, is a dialect of Chut (Chamberlain 2003, Sidwell 2009).

== Varieties ==
Maleng consists of three dialect clusters:

- Maleng (Mã Liềng); Kha Pakatan; Malang; Arem/Harème (Rivière 1902). Sub-varieties include Kha Muong Ben and Kha Bo (Fraisse 1950).
- Ma Lieng, also known as Pa Leng (Đặng Nghiêm Vạn et al. 1986)
- Kha Phong (formerly an exonym, but now also used as an autonym); Maleng Kari; Maleng Bro. Also known as Kha Nam Om (Fraisse 1949). The Kha Phong live in 2 to 3 villages in Laos, and in one village in Hà Tĩnh province, Vietnam. Strongly influenced by Lao. Maleng Bro was documented by Michel Ferlus in 1992 (see Ferlus 1997), and also by the 2012-2013 Russian-Vietnamese Linguistic Expedition.

== Distribution ==
Maleng is spoken in the following villages of Laos and Vietnam.

- Khammouane province, Laos
  - Nậm Huay
  - Pung Kợt
  - Song Khon
  - Upper Nrong River
  - Xang Huay E An
- Quảng Bình province (500+ people) and Hà Tĩnh province (in Hương Khê district; 133 people in 2012), Vietnam
  - Hương Lâm
  - Hương Liên
  - Lâm Hóa
