= Thavung language =

Austroasiatic language spoken in Laos and Thailand

Thavưng
- Phon Soung, Aheu
- พาซา โซ่ (ทะวืง)
- Pronunciation: /pʰasa¹ so³ tʰawɨŋ¹/
- Native to: Laos, Thailand
- Native speakers: 700 (2007)
- Language family: Austroasiatic: Vietic; Thavưng
- Writing system: Thai

Language codes
- ISO 639-3: thm
- Glottolog: aheu1239
- ELP: Thavung
- Aheu is classified as Definitely Endangered by the UNESCO Atlas of the World's Languages in Danger.

Thavưng or Aheu is a language spoken by the Phon Sung people in Laos and Thailand. There are thought to be some 750 speakers in Thailand (1996) and 1,770 speakers in Laos (2000), largely concentrated in Khamkeut District. A further 750 speakers live in 3 villages of Song Dao District, Sakon Nakhon Province, Thailand, namely Ban Nong Waeng (in Pathum Wapi Subdistrict), Ban Nong Charoen, and Ban Nong Muang.

Thavung makes a four-way distinction between clear and breathy phonation combined with glottalized final consonants. This is very similar to the situation in the Pearic languages in which, however, the glottalization is in the vowel.

== Phonology ==
=== Consonants ===
Consonants
| | | Labial | Alveolar | Palatal | Velar | Glottal |
|---|---|---|---|---|---|---|
| Nasal | | m | n | ɲ | ŋ | |
| Stop | plain | p | t | c | k | ʔ |
| Stop | aspirated | pʰ | tʰ | cʰ | kʰ | |
| Stop | voiced | b | d | | | |
| Fricative | | f | s | | | h |
| Approximant | | w | l | j | | |
| Trill | | | ɾ | | | |

=== Vowels ===
The vowels
| | Front | Central | Back |
|---|---|---|---|
| Close | i | ɨ | u |
| Close-mid | e | | o |
| Mid | | ǝ | |
| Open-mid | | | ɔ |
| Open | a | | |

The vowels can also be long. In Thavung there are 3 Diphthongs: ia ɨa ua.
