= Vietnamese morphology =

Vietnamese, like many languages in Southeast Asia, is an analytic (and isolating) language.

Vietnamese lacks morphological markings of case, gender, number, and tense (and, as a result, has no finite/nonfinite distinction) and distinguishes them via classifier words instead.

== Overview ==
Vietnamese is often considered to be monosyllabic as its morphemes are considered to be monosyllabic e.g. "tim" meaning "heart". However, some Vietnamese words may consist of one or more syllables, composed of monosyllabic morphemes that form together to create another word. An instance of a compound word "xe lửa" is derived from morphemes xe meaning "vehicle", lửa meaning "fire", fused to create the word xe lửa to mean "train".

There is a general tendency for words to have one or two syllables. Words with two syllables are often of Sino-Vietnamese origin. A few words are three or four syllables. A few polysyllabic words are formed from reduplicative derivation.

Additionally, a Vietnamese word may consist of a single morpheme or more than one morpheme. Polymorphemic words are either compound words or words consisting of stems plus affixes or reduplicants.

Most Vietnamese morphemes consist of only one syllable. Polysyllabic morphemes tend to be borrowings from other languages. Examples follow:

Vietnamese word	English gloss	Phonological form	Morphological form
cơm	"cooked rice"	monosyllabic	monomorphemic
cù lao	"island"	disyllabic	monomorphemic
dưa chuột/dưa leo	"cucumber"	disyllabic	bimorphemic
vội vội vàng vàng	"hurry-scurry"	polysyllabic	polymorphemic (reduplicative)

Most words are created by either compounding or reduplicative derivation. Affixation is a relatively minor derivational process.

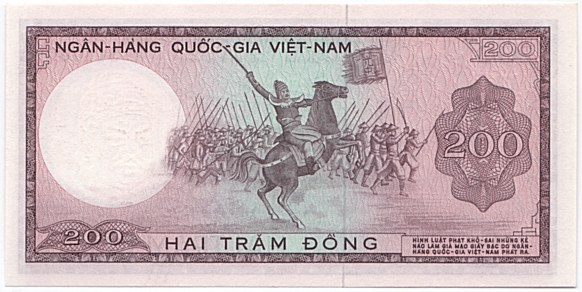
The reverse of a South Vietnamese 200 đồng note, where the old hyphenated writing is seen at the upper left and lower right. Today, it would be written as "Ngân hàng Quốc gia Việt Nam" and "Hình luật phạt khổ sai nhửng kẻ nào giả mạo giấy bạc do Ngân hàng Quốc gia Việt Nam phát ra" respectively.

Older styles of Vietnamese writing wrote polysyllabic words with hyphens separating the syllables, as in cào-cào "grasshopper", sinh-vật-học "biology", or cà-phê "coffee". Spelling reform proposals have suggested writing these words without spaces (for example, the above would be càocào, sinhvậthọc, càphê). However, the prevailing practice is to omit hyphens and write all words with a space between each syllable.

== Word-formation ==
=== Reduplication ===
Reduplication, the process of creating a new word by repeating either a whole word or part of a word, is very productive in Vietnamese (as in other Austro-Asiatic languages), although not all reduplicative patterns remain fully productive.

==== Function and semantics ====
Its effect is to sometimes either increase or decrease the intensity of the adjective and is often used as a literary device (like alliteration) in poetry and other compositions, as well as in everyday speech.

Examples of reduplication increasing intensity:

- đau → đau điếng: hurt → hurt horribly
- mạnh → mạnh mẽ: strong → very strong
- rực → rực rỡ: flaring → blazing

Examples of reduplication decreasing intensity:

- nhẹ → nhè nhẹ: soft → soft (less)
- xinh → xinh xinh: pretty → cute
- đỏ → đo đỏ: red → reddish
- xanh → xanh xanh: blue/green → bluish/greenish

==== Form ====
A type of assimilation known as tonal harmony is involved in Vietnamese reduplication. The six tones are categorized into two registers:

Register	Tones
Upper	ngang, sắc, and hỏi
Lower	huyền, nặng, and ngã

The tones of all reduplicated words are always within the same tonal register (either upper or lower). For example, nhỏ "small" with the hỏi tone when reduplicated appears as nho nhỏ "smallish" with a ngang-toned reduplicant — both syllables are in the upper tonal register.

Vietnamese has several different types of reduplicative patterns including total, partial, initial, final, rhyming, and alliterative patterns involving only reduplicated material or both reduplicated material and affixation.

Reduplicant position. The resulting reduplicants can be either initial (preceding the base) or final (following the base).

Initial reduplication:

- bự "big" > bừ bự "quite big" (less) (base: bự, initial reduplicant: bừ-)
- khắm "fetid" > khăm khắm "smelly" (base: khắm, initial reduplicant/affix: khăm-)

Final reduplication:

- mập "be fat" > mập mạp "be chubby" (base: mập, final reduplicant/affix: -mạp)
- khóc "to weep" > khóc lóc "to whimper" (base: khóc, final reduplicant/affix: -lóc)

Total reduplication involves copying the entire word base:

- vàng " yellow" > vàng vàng "yellowish"
- vui "be joyful" > vui vui "jovial, fun"
- nói "to talk" > nói nói "to keep talking and talking"
- nghiêng "inclined" > nghiêng nghiêng "slightly slanted"

Partial reduplication involves copying only certain segments of the word base. Partial reduplication typically involves the affixation of non-reduplicated segments.

=== Affixation ===
Vietnamese has very limited affixation. Only prefixation and suffixation are attested. A few affixes are used along with reduplication. Many affixes are derived from Sino-Vietnamese vocabulary and are learned part of the lexicon. Some examples (not an exhaustive list) follow.

Prefixes
Prefix	Gloss	Examples
bán-	"half"	bán nguyệt "semicircular, semi-monthly" (bán- + -nguyệt "moon"), bán đảo "peninsula" (bán- + đảo "island")
khả-	"ability"	khả kính "respectable" (khả- + kính "to respect"), khả quan "satisfactory" (khả- + quan "to behold")
lão-	familiar (added to surnames)	lão Thinh "ol’ Thinh, good old Thinh" (lão- + Thinh surname)
phản-	"counter to, against"	phản cách mạng "counter-revolutionary" (phản- + cách mạng "revolution"), phản chiến "anti-war" (phản- + -chiến "to fight")
phi-	"not"	phi nghĩa "unethical" (phi- + nghĩa "righteousness"), phi chính phủ "non-governmental" (phi- + chính phủ "government")
siêu-	"above, better"	siêu thị "supermarket" (siêu- + thị "market"), siêu đẳng "outstanding" (siêu- + đẳng "level")
tăng-	"over, high"	tăng a xit "hyperacidity" (tăng- + a xit "acid"), tăng can xi "hypercalcaemia" (tăng- + can xi "calcium")
thứ-	ordinal (added to numerals)	thứ mười "tenth" (thứ- + mười "ten"), thứ bốn mươi ba "forty-third" (thứ- + bốn mươi ba "forty-three")

Suffixes
Suffix	Gloss	Examples
-gia	"profession"	chính trị gia "politician" (chính trị "politics" + -gia), khoa học gia "scientist" (khoa học "science" + -gia)
-giả	agentive	tác giả "author" (tác "to create" + -giả), học giả "scholar" (học "to learn" + -giả)
-hóa	forms causative verb	a xít hóa "to acidify" (a xit "acid" + -hóa), mỹ hóa "to americanize" (Mỹ "USA" + -hóa)
-học	"field of study"	ngôn ngữ học "linguistics" (ngôn ngữ "language" + -học), động vật học "zoology" (động vật "animal" + -học)
-kế	"measuring device"	nhiệt kế "thermometer" (nhiệt- "warm" + -kế), áp kế "manometer" (áp "get close, approach" + -kế)
-khoa	"field of study"	nha khoa "dentistry" (nha- "tooth" + -khoa), dược khoa "pharmacy" (dược- "drug" + -khoa)
-sĩ	"expert"	hoạ sĩ "artist" (hoạ "to draw" + -sĩ), văn sĩ "writer" (văn "literature" + -sĩ)
-sư	"master"	giáo sư "professor" (giáo "to teach" + -sư), luật sư "lawyer" (luật "law" + -sư)
-viên	agentive	quan sát viên "observer" (quan sát "to observe" + -viên), phối trí viên "coordinator" (phối trí "to coordinate" + -viên)

=== Ablaut ===
Vietnamese has the following tonal alternations (or tonal ablaut) which are used grammatically:

		tone alternation
đây "here"	đấy "there"	(ngang tone > sắc tone)
bây giờ "now"	bấy giờ "then"	(ngang tone > sắc tone)
kia "the other"	kìa "yonder"	(ngang tone > huyền tone)

(Nguyễn 1997:42-44)

Vietnamese also has other instances of alternations, such as consonant mutations and vowel ablaut. Different regional varieties of Vietnamese may have different types of alternations.

== See also ==
- Vietnamese syntax
- Vietnamese phonology
- Vietnamese language

== Bibliography ==
- Beatty, Mark Stanton. (1990). Vietnamese phrase structure: An X-bar approach. (Master's thesis, University of Texas at Arlington).
- Emeneau, M. B. (1951). Studies in Vietnamese (Annamese) grammar. University of California publications in linguistics (Vol. 8). Berkeley: University of California Press.
- Nguyễn, Đình-Hoà. (1997). Vietnamese: Tiếng Việt không son phấn. Amsterdam: John Benjamins Publishing Company.
- Nguyễn, Phú Phong. (1992). Vietnamese demonstratives revisited. Mon-Khmer Studies, 20, 127-136.
- Nguyễn, Tài Cẩn. (1975). Từ loại danh từ trong tiếng Việt hiện đại [The word class of nouns in modern Vietnamese]. Hanoi: Khoa học Xã hội.
- Nhàn, Ngô Thanh. (1984). The syllabeme and patterns of word formation in Vietnamese. (Doctoral dissertation, New York University).
- Noyer, Rolf (1998). "Vietnamese 'morphology' and the definition of word". University of Pennsylvania Working Papers in Linguistics. 5 (2): 65–89.
- Phong, Nguyễn Phu. (1976). Le syntagme verbal in vietnamien. Mouton: Le Haye.
- Shum, Shu-ying. (1965). A transformational study of Vietnamese syntax. (Doctoral dissertation, Indiana University).
- Thompson, Laurence E. (1963). The problem of the word in Vietnamese. Word, 19 (1), 39-52.
- Thompson, Laurence E. (1965). Nuclear models in Vietnamese immediate-constituent analysis. Language, 41 (4), 610-618.
- Thompson, Laurence E. (1991). A Vietnamese reference grammar. Seattle: University of Washington Press. Honolulu: University of Hawaii Press. (Original work published 1965).
- Uỷ ban Khoa học Xã hội Việt Nam. (1983). Ngữ-pháp tiếng Việt [Vietnamese grammar]. Hanoi: Khoa học Xã hội.
