= Vietnamese grammar =

Grammar of the Vietnamese language

Vietnamese is an analytic language, meaning it conveys grammatical information primarily through combinations of words as opposed to affixes. The basic word order is subject-verb-object (SVO), but utterances may be restructured so as to be topic-prominent. Vietnamese also has verb serialization. In sentences, the head of the phrase usually precedes its complements (i.e. head-initial), nouns are classified according to series of lexical parameters (noun classifier system), and pronouns may be absent from utterances (pro-drop, sometimes without copula verbs). Question words in the language do not exhibit wh-movement.

== Word classes ==
Vietnamese lexical categories (or "parts of speech") consist of:

- nouns
- demonstrative noun modifiers
- articles
- classifiers
- numerals
- quantifiers
- the focus marker particles
- verbs
- adjectives
- adverbial particles
- prepositions

The syntax of each lexical category and its associated phrase (i.e., the syntactic constituents below the sentence level) is detailed below. Attention is paid to both form and function.

== Morphosyntax ==
=== Nouns and noun phrases ===
Nouns can be distinguished from verbs syntactically in that the copula là "to be" may precede nouns in predications, whereas the copula fails to occur before verbs or adjectives.

Mai là sinh viên.
"Mai is (a) student."

For the meaning of the sentence to be understandable, in the sentence above the copula là precedes sinh viên "student". Omitting the copula, as in *Mai sinh viên results in an ungrammatical sentence. In contrast, verbs/adjectives do not co-occur with the copula.

Mai cao.
"Mai is tall."

The adjective cao (as in the sentence above) does not require a preceding copula, and thus the sentence *Mai là cao is ill-formed.

The noun category can be further subdivided into different noun classes according to semantic and syntactic criteria. Some of the subclasses identified in Nguyễn (1997) include:

- proper noun
- common noun
  - item noun
  - collective noun
  - unit (or measure) noun
  - mass noun
  - time noun
  - abstract noun
- classifier
- locative

Nouns can be modified with other words, resulting in complex noun phrases. These modifiers include demonstratives, quantifiers, classifiers, prepositional phrases, and other attributive lexical words, such as other nouns and verbs. These modifiers co-occur with the modified noun (known as the head noun or noun phrase head), but there are restrictions on what kinds of modifiers are allowed depending upon the subclass of noun. The noun phrase has the following structure:

TOTALITY	+	ARTICLE	+	QUANTIFIER	+	CLASSIFIER	+	HEAD NOUN	+	ATTRIBUTIVE MODIFIER(S)	+	DEMONSTRATIVE	+	PREPOSITIONAL PHRASE (possessive)

Example:

cả hai cuốn {từ điển} {Việt Anh} này {của [nó]}
all two CLF_{book} dictionary Vietnamese-English PROX.DEM {of [3.PN]}
totality quantifier classifier head noun attributive noun phrase demonstrative prep phrase
"both of these Vietnamese-English dictionaries of his"

==== Article position ====
Following Nguyễn Hùng Tưởng (2004) and Nguyễn T. C. (1975), Vietnamese has an article lexical category slot that occurs before a quantifier.

những {ý nghĩ}
PL idea
"(the) ideas"

các quả cam
PL CLF orange
"(the) oranges"

==== Quantifiers ====
Quantifiers (also known as numerators) modify the adjacent noun by expressing their quantity. In Vietnamese, they occur within a noun phrase before a head noun (with or without a classifier). Quantifiers include cardinal numerals and other words which indicate some quantity. (Cardinal numerals are described in the numeral section.) Examples of quantifiers:

Quantifier	English gloss
một, hai, ba, bốn, etc.	cardinal numerals
vài, vài ba	few
dăm, dăm bảy	several, few
mọi	every
mỗi	each
từng	each in turn
mấy	few, how much/how many
bao nhiêu	how much/how many
bây nhiêu/bấy nhiêu	"this much/this many

Quantifiers directly precede the head noun that they modify when the head occurs without a classifier:

hai {quan điểm}
two viewpoint
"(the) two viewpoints"

ba đêm
three night
"three nights"

dăm bữa
few day
"(a) few days"

mấy người
some people
"how many people?"

how many = bao nhiêu

When a classifier co-occurs with a following head noun, the quantifier precedes the classifier:

hai cuốn {từ điển}
two CLF dictionary
"(the) two dictionaries"

sáu bông {hoa hồng} kia
six CLF rose DIST.DEM
"those six roses over there"

mấy con cá
few CLF fish
"(a) few fish"

As in English, mass nouns such as thịt "meat", đất "soil", and collective nouns such as trâu bò "cattle", ruộng nương "(rice) fields" usually occur without quantifiers in Vietnamese. However, these nouns can be specified by words denoting measurement units such as cân "kilogram", lạng "tael", nắm "handful", chén "cupful":

ba cân thịt
three kilogram meat
"three kilograms of meat"

một lạng thịt
one tael meat
"one tael of meat"

==== Focus marker position ====
The optional particle cái is identified as a focus marker by Nguyễn Hùng Tưởng (2004). It has been called by several other names, including general classifier, general categorical, ''extra" cái, "extra" general classifier, definite article, superarticle, definite word, demonstrative word, and chỉ xuất "indexical". Focus cái occurs directly before classifiers or unit nouns and may be preceded by other pre-noun modifiers such as quantifiers, numerals, and articles. It always co-occurs with a classifier.

As can be seen by descriptions of focus cái as "general classifier", etc., this particle has often been analyzed as a classifier. However, it can be distinguished by its different behavior. Focus cái always precedes a following classifier and may not directly precede the head noun. The noun phrase

cái con chó này
FOC CLF dog DEM.PROX
"this very dog"

is grammatical, but the phrase

* con cái chó này
{} CLF FOC dog DEM.PROX
"this very dog"

is not grammatical. More than one classifier is not allowed within the same noun phrase, whereas focus cái does occur along with a following classifier (as can be seen above). Examples of other modifiers preceding the focus marker are below:

hai cái con chó đen này
two.NUM FOC CLF dog black DEM.PROX
"these very two black dogs"

mấy cái con mèo này
PL.ART FOC CLF cat DEM.PROX
"these very cats"

Again, cái must follow the other pre-noun modifiers, so phrases where cái precedes a numeral or article (such as *cái hai chó đen này or *cái các con mèo này) are ungrammatical.

The focus marker cái is distinct from the classifier cái that classifies inanimate nouns (although it is historically related to the classifier cái). Thus, classifier cái cannot modify the noun chó "dog" (in cái chó) since chó is animate (the non-human animate classifier con must be used: con chó), whereas focus cái can modify nouns of any animacy (with their appropriate classifier):

cái cuốn sách này
FOC CLF book DEM.PROX
"this very book"

cái con mèo này
FOC CLF cat DEM.PROX
"this very cat"

cái người lính này
FOC CLF soldier DEM.PROX
"this very soldier"

Functionally, cái indicates grammatically that an element within a noun phrase is in contrastive focus. It has been noted by Nguyễn Đ. H. (1997) (and others) that cái adds a pejorative connotation, as in:

cái thằng chồng em
FOC CLF husband KIN

nó
3SG.PN

chẳng ra gì
NEG turn.out INTERR.INAN.PN

topicalized noun phrase
subj noun phrase
predicate
"that husband of mine, he is good for nothing"

However, Nguyễn Hùng Tưởng (2004) claims that the connotation is not always negative and gives the following positive example:

tôi
1SG.PN

gặp
meet

cái con nhỏ {tử tế}
FOC CLF little kind

subj noun phrase
verb
obj noun phrase
"it is the kind-hearted girl that I met"

Phonologically, the focus cái receives an intonational stress, and, in addition, the element receiving the focus also receives an intonational stress. In the following examples, the stressed words are indicated with capital letters (also underlined):

tôi
1SG.PN

thích
like

CÁI con ngựa ĐEN
FOC CLF horse black

subj noun phrase
verb
obj noun phrase
"I like the BLACK horse" (but not the horse that's a different color)

In the above sentence, the item in focus is đen "black", which receives the stress (as does cái). Here, it is the feature of the horse's blackness that is being focused on (or singled out) in contrast to other horses that do not have the feature of blackness. In the sentence below, ngựa "horse" receives the focus and stress.

tôi
1SG.PN

thích
like

CÁI con NGỰA đen
FOC CLF horse black

subj noun phrase
verb
obj noun phrase
"I like the black HORSE" (but not the other black animal)

The focus marker is always stressed and must co-occur with another stressed item; thus, cái cannot occur without another stressed element within the noun phrase. Focus cái may focus a variety of noun phrase elements including prepositional phrases, relative clauses, constituents inside of relative clause modifiers, the head noun (by itself), the head noun plus preceding classifier, and adjectival verbs.

==== Classifier position ====
Vietnamese uses a rich set of classifiers and measure words (often considered a subset of the classifiers) to introduce or stand in for count and mass nouns, respectively. This feature of Vietnamese is similar to the system of classifiers in Chinese.

The most common classifiers typically do not translate to English: cái introduces most inanimate objects, while con generally introduces animate objects, especially animals. In the following dialogue, the classifier con initially introduces "chicken":

Bán cho tôi bốn con gà.
sell for me four CLF.ANIM chicken
"Sell me four chickens."

{Bao nhiêu?}
{how many}
"How many?"

Bốn con.
four CLF.ANIM
"Four [of them]."

Nouns may require the animate classifier even if they do not refer to living organisms. For instance, dao (knife), đường (road), mắt (eye), sông (river), and vít (screw) all take the con classifier to convey motion.

More specific classifiers typically indicate the shape of objects, such as quả for round objects like balls or pieces of fruit, or tấm for flat, rectangular objects like signage or panes of glass. These classifiers may be superficially likened to English partitive constructions like one head of cattle ("head", always singular regardless of number, indicates large livestock), two sticks of dynamite ("stick" indicates something relatively rigid, long and comparatively thin), three strands of hair ("strand" indicates something flexible, long and quite thin), or four bars of gold (a "bar" being similar to a "stick", but comparatively less "thin"). Some nominalizing classifiers introduce verbs or adjectives instead of nouns.

Some linguists count as many as 200 classifiers in Vietnamese, though only a few are used in conversation or informal writing. Thompson (1987) notes that usage of cái for inanimate objects has increased at the expense of some of the rarer classifiers.

Among the most common classifiers are:

- cái : used for most inanimate objects
- chiếc: almost similar to cái, usually more connotative (e.g. when referring to a cute object, chiếc might be more suitable than cái)
- con: usually for animals and children, but can be used to describe some non-living objects that are associated with motion
- người: used for people except infants
- bài: used for compositions like songs, drawings, poems, essays, etc.
- câu: sentential constructs (verses, lyrics, statements, quotes, etc.)
- cây: used for stick-like objects (plants, guns, canes, etc.)
- chuyện: a general topic, matter, or business
- lá: smaller sheets of paper (letters, playing cards)
- tòa: buildings of authority: courts, halls, "ivory towers".
- quả/trái: used for globular objects (the Earth, fruits)
- quyển/cuốn: used for book-like objects (books, journals, etc.)
- tờ: sheets and other thin objects made of paper (newspapers, papers, calendars, etc.)
- việc: an event or an ongoing process

Classifiers are required in the presence of a quantifier, except for "non-classified nouns": "time units" such as phút (minute), geographical and administrative units such as tỉnh (province), and polysyllabic Sino-Vietnamese compound nouns.

The classifier cái has a special role in that it can introduce any other classifier, e.g. cái con, cái chiếc, but Nguyễn Hùng Tường (2013) considers this to be a non-classifier use of cái.

==== Attributive modifier position ====
includes noun phrase modifiers, verb phrase modifiers

==== Demonstrative position ====
Nouns may be modified by certain demonstratives that follow the noun (see also demonstrative section below). These demonstratives include: này "this", nầy "this", nay "this", ni "this", đó "that", nấy "that", ấy "that", nãy "that", kia "that yonder", nọ "that yonder", kìa "that yonder (far)", nào "which". Examples:

bà này
lady PROX.DEM
"this lady"

năm nay
year PROX.DEM
"this year"

lúc đó
moment MEDIAL.DEM
"that moment"

ông ấy
gentleman MEDIAL.DEM
"that gentleman"

lúc nãy
moment MEDIAL.DEM
"a moment ago"

bữa nọ
day DIST.DEM
"one day"

hôm kia
day DIST.DEM
"day before yesterday"

người nào
person INDEF.DEM
"which person"

==== Prepositional phrase position ====
Possession is shown in Vietnamese via a prepositional phrase that modifies the next word, a noun. Any words after that are subsequent to that are, essentially, articles or demonstratives that bring up qualifying clauses.

==== Reference, specificity, definiteness ====
Vietnamese nouns that stand alone are unmarked for number and definiteness. Thus, a noun, such as sách, may be glossed in English as "a book" (singular, indefinite), "the book" (singular, definite), "some books" (plural, indefinite), or "the books" (plural, definite). It is with the addition of classifiers, demonstratives, and other modifiers that the number and definiteness can be specified.

- reference
  - specific vs. generic reference generic mood & generic antecedents
  - definiteness (identifiability of referent)
- count noun vs. mass noun
- interaction with classifiers (presence and absence thereof)
- see Behrens (2003)

=== Pronouns ===
Vietnamese pronouns act as substitutions for noun phrases.

Hoan
Hoan

chỉ ăn cơm {Việt Nam} thôi
only eat food Vietnam only

subj noun phrase
predicate
"Hoan only eats Vietnamese food"

nó
3SG.PN

chỉ ăn cơm {Việt Nam} thôi
only eat food Vietnam only

subj noun phrase
predicate
"he only eats Vietnamese food"

con chó này
CLF dog PROX.DEM

chẳng {bao giờ} sủa cả
NEG ever bark all

subj noun phrase
predicate
"this dog never barks at all"

nó
3SG.PN

chẳng {bao giờ} sủa cả
NEG ever bark all

subj noun phrase
predicate
"it never barks at all"

Thus, the third person singular (arrogant) pronoun nó can substitute for a simple noun phrase Hoan (a personal name) consisting of a single noun or a complex noun phrase con chó này consisting of a noun plus modifiers (which, here, are a classifier and a demonstrative).

Note that the pronominal system as a whole also includes kinship terms (see kinship term section below) and certain demonstratives (see demonstrative section below), which can also have a pronominal function.

The pronouns are categorized into two classes depending on whether they can be preceded by the plural marker chúng. Like other Asian pronominal systems, Vietnamese pronouns indicate the social status between speakers and other persons in the discourse in addition to grammatical person and number. The table below shows the first class of pronouns that can be preceded by pluralizer.

	Singular	Plural
1st person	tôi (inferior to superior)	–
1st person	ta (emphatic, superior to inferior)	ta (emphatic, superior to inferior)
1st person	tao (superior to inferior, familiar)	–
1st person	mình (intimate)	mình (intimate)
2nd Person	mày or mi or bay (superior to inferior, familiar)	bay (superior to inferior, familiar)
3rd Person	nó (superior to inferior, familiar) y (southern dialect only, see below)	–

The first person tôi is the only pronoun that can be used in polite speech. The second person ta is often used when talking to oneself as in a soliloquy, but also indicates a higher status of the speaker (such as that of a high official, etc.). The other superior-to-inferior forms in the first and second persons (tao, mày, mi, bay) are commonly used in familiar social contexts, such as among family members (e.g. older sister to younger sister, etc.); these forms are otherwise considered impolite. The third person form nó (used to refer to inanimates, animals, children, and scorned adults, such as criminals) is considerably less arrogant than the second person forms tao, mày, mi, bay. The pronoun mình is used only in intimate relationships, such as between husband and wife.

The pronominal forms in the table above can be modified with plural chúng as in chúng mày "you (guys)", chúng nó "them". There is an exclusive/inclusive plural distinction in the first person: chúng tôi and chúng tao are exclusive (i.e., me and them but not you), chúng ta and chúng mình are inclusive (i.e., you and me). Some of the forms (ta, mình, bay) can be used to refer to a plural referent, resulting in pairs with overlapping reference (e.g., both ta and chúng ta can mean "inclusive we", both bay and chúng bay can mean "you guys").

The other class of pronouns are known as "absolute" pronouns (Thompson 1965). These cannot be modified with the pluralizer chúng. Many of these forms are literary and archaic, particularly in the first and second person.

	Singular	Plural
1st person	min (familiar, literary)	choa (literary)
1st person	qua (male to female, literary)	choa (literary)
1st person	thiếp (female to male, literary)	choa (literary)
1st person	Trẫm (king to subject, archaic)	choa (literary)
1st person	thần (subject to king, archaic)	choa (literary)
2nd Person	bậu (female to male, literary)	–
2nd Person	chàng (female to male, literary)	–
2nd Person	ngài (subject to king, archaic)	–
3rd Person	y (familiar)	người ta (generic)
3rd Person	hắn (familiar)	người ta (generic)
3rd Person	va (familiar)	người ta (generic)
3rd Person	người ta (generic)	người ta (generic)

Unlike third person pronouns of the first type, these absolute third person forms (y, hắn, va) refer only to animate referents (typically people). The form y can be preceded by the pluralizer in southern dialects in which case it is more respectful than nó. The absolute pronoun người ta has a wider range of reference as "they, people in general, (generic) one, we, someone".

As a result of language contact, some linguists have noted that some Vietnamese speech communities (especially among young college students and bilingual speakers) have borrowed French and English pronouns moi, toi, I, and you in order to avoid the deference and status implications present in the Vietnamese pronominal system (which lacks any truly neutral terms).

=== Verbs and verb phrases ===
As mentioned in the noun section above, verbs can be distinguished from nouns by their ability to function as predicators by themselves without a preceding copula là. Additionally, verbs may be categorized into two main subtypes, stative and functive, according to their syntactic behavior.

==== Stative verbs ====
Stative verbs (also known as verbs of quality, extended state verbs, adjectival verbs or adjectives) can be distinguished from functive verbs in two:

1. stative verbs occur with a degree modifier such as rất ‘very’
2. stative verbs preclude the use of exhortatives such as hãy

Giáp rất cao
“Giap is very tall”

*Hãy trắng! (ungrammatical)
“Be white!”

==== Functive verbs ====
Functive verbs (also known as "real" verbs, verbs of action, "doing" words, or momentary action verbs) differ from stative verbs by the same syntactic tests:

1. functive verbs cannot be preceded by a degree modifier such as rất "very"
2. functive verbs can be preceded by the exhortative hãy "let's (do)" (indicates commands, requests, etc.)

*Giáp rất ăn. (ungrammatical)
"Giap very eat."

Anh hãy ăn đi!
"Go ahead and eat!"

A verb can interleave with a direct object for emphasis:

{biết} + {thân phận} → {biết thân biết phận}
{to know} + {social status} → {to know one's place}

{đi} + {tới lui} → {đi tới đi lui}
{to go} + {back and forth} → {to go back and forth}

{nói} + {bậy bạ} → {nói bậy nói bạ}
{to speak} + {objectionable} → {to speak objectionably}

In the last example, the verb nói splits the bound morphemes of the reduplicated word bậy bạ.

==== Tense markers ====
Although it is not required, Vietnamese has many particles that are used to mark tenses. However, they are not always used as context may suffice. All these markers, except "rồi" which goes after the verb, go before the verb. (Below each point, there is an example of the marker being used with the verb "to have dinner" or "ăn tối".)

- To make the past tense, use "đã"

Tôi đã ăn tối – I had dinner

- To make the future tense, use "sẽ"

Tôi sẽ ăn tối – I will have dinner

- To say that you just did something (e.g. I just ate), use "vừa mới". However it is possible to remove either "vừa" or "mới" and keep the same meaning, however removing "vừa" is more common.

Tôi vừa mới ăn tối – I just had dinner

- To say that you are about to do something (e.g. I am about to eat), use "sắp".

Tôi sắp ăn tối – I am about to have dinner

- To say that you already did something (e.g. I already ate), use "rồi". It is often used with "đã"

Tôi (đã) ăn tối rồi – I already had dinner

- To make a verb continuous (e.g. I am eating), use "đang". It can be combined with most of the tense markers, however this isn't common usage.

Tôi đang ăn tối – I am having dinner Tôi đã đang ăn tối – I was having dinner

- "Có" is also used as a past tense of the verb very similar to "đã". It has other uses outside of this.

=== Passivization ===
The active voice can be changed to passive voice by adding the following words: "được" if the verb describing the action implies beneficial effects for the agent and "bị" if the verb describing the action implies negative effects. The words "được" and "bị" must stand in front of the main verb.

Trà được trồng ở Nhật Bản
Tea is grown in Japan.

An agent, if there is one, is often placed in between the passive particle and the main verb:

{Trần Lập} được {nhiều người} {biết tới}
{Trần Lập} PASS {many people} {know about}
Trần Lập is known about by many people. (Many people know about Trần Lập.)

When used with intransitive verbs (and adjectives), these two particles imply the subject is a passive participant to the action described by the verb, as in following example:

Anh ta bị chóng mặt
He is feeling dizzy

=== Topic–comment structure ===
The topic–comment structure is an important sentence type in Vietnamese. Therefore, Vietnamese has often been claimed to be a topic-prominent language (Thompson 1991). As an example the sentence "Tôi đọc sách này rồi." ("I've already read this book.") can be transformed into the following topic prominent equivalent. Note that the topic marker can also be dropped.

Sách này (thì) tôi đọc rồi
This book (TOPICMARKER) I read already

== Lexicon ==
=== Kinship terms ===
Kinship terms in Vietnamese have become grammaticalized to a large extent and thus have developed grammatical functions similar to pronouns and other classifiers. In these cases, they are used as honorifics or pejoratives. Kinship terms may also, of course, be used with a lexical meaning like other nouns.

==== Pronominal function ====
When used with a pronominal function, kinship terms primarily indicate the social status between referents in a discourse, such as between the speaker and the hearer, between speaker and another referent, etc. Included within the notion of social status are classifications of age, sex, relative social position, and the speaker's attitude.

For example, one can express the meaning of I love you in Vietnamese using many different pronouns.

- Anh yêu em (male to female [or younger male] lover)
- Em yêu anh (female [or younger male] to male lover)
- Mẹ yêu con (mother to child)
- Con yêu mẹ (child to mother)

The most common terms of reference are kinship terms, which might differ slightly in different regions.

When addressing an audience, the speaker must carefully assess the social relationship between him/her and the audience, difference in age, and sex of the audience to choose an appropriate form of address. The following are some kinship terms of address that can be used in the second-person sense (you). They all can also be used in the first-person sense (I), but if they're not marked by (S) the usage is limited to the literal meaning:

- Ông: grandfather, used as a term of respect for a man senior to the speaker and who is late middle age or older
- Bà: grandmother, used as a term of respect for a (usually married) woman senior to the speaker and who is late middle age or older
- Bá: parent's older sister, used to address a woman slightly older than one's parents or wife of father's older brother or wife of mother's older brother.
- Bác: parent's older brother or sister, used to address a man/woman slightly older than one's parents or husband of father's older sister or husband of mother's older sister.
- Cô: father's sister, used to address a younger woman or a woman as old as one's father; also used to address a female teacher regardless of relative age
- Cậu: mother's brother, used to address a younger man or a man as old as one's mother
- Dì: mother's sister, used to address a younger woman or a woman as old as one's mother; also used to address one's stepmother
- Chú: father's younger brother, used to address a man slightly younger than one's father or husband of father's younger sister.
- Thím: wife of father's younger brother.
- Mợ: wife of mother's younger brother.
- Dượng: husband of father's older sister; also used to address one's stepfather
- Anh: older brother, for a slightly older man, or for the man in a romantic relationship. (S)
- Chị: older sister, for a slightly older woman. (S)
- Em: younger sibling, for a slightly younger person, or for the woman [or younger man] in a romantic relationship. (S)
- Bố/Ba/Cha: father
- Mẹ/Má/Mợ: mother
- Con: child; also used in some regions to address a person as old as one's child
- Cháu: nephew/niece, grandson/granddaughter; used to address a young person of around such relative age

Using a person's name to refer to oneself or to address another is considered more personal and informal than using pronouns. It can be found among close friends or children.

=== Demonstratives ===
Vietnamese demonstratives (markers of deixis) all have the function of identifying a referent with respect to another contextual point or position. For example, the demonstrative này "this" as in the noun phrase người này "this person" indicates that the person referred to is relatively close to the speaker (in a context where this noun phrase is uttered by a speaker to an addressee) while the demonstrative đó "that" as in the noun phrase người đó "that person" indicates that the person referred to is further from the speaker.

The demonstratives have a basic three-term deictic system — proximal (close – "this, here"), medial (far – "that, there"), distal (very far – "yonder, over there") — plus an indefinite (or interrogative) term ("which, where"). In addition to their deictic function, different Vietnamese demonstratives can function variously as noun modifiers, as noun phrases (i.e., a (pro-) nominal function), or as adverbials.

Function	Proximal	Medial	Distal	Indefinite
Nominal	đây "here"	đấy "there"	–	đâu "where, wherever"
Nominal/Noun modifier	–	đó "there, that"	kia/kìa "over there, yonder" (bidirectional)	–
Noun modifier	này/nầy/nay/ni "this"	nấy/ấy "that"	nọ "yonder" (unidirectional – past)	nào "which(ever)"
Proportion	bây "to this extent"	bấy "to that extent, to such an extent"		bao "to what(ever) extent"
Manner	vầy "this way, thus"	vậy "that way, so"		sao "how(ever)"

The form này tends to be used in Northern Vietnamese while nầy is the Southern form and ni is the North-central and Central form. In North-central and Central Vietnamese, the form nớ is used instead of nọ, mô instead of nào and đâu, rứa instead of vậy, and răng instead of sao.

In Hanoi, the form thế or như thế "(like) so, (like) this way" is used instead of vầy. Other forms mentioned in Thompson (1965) are nay "this", nây "this (temporal)", nãy or nẫy "that (just past)", and nao "which".

The basic formal pattern of the demonstratives is that the initial consonant and ending vowel nucleus indicate their function and position in the deictic system. Some linguists have analyzed demonstratives as consisting of two (sub-syllabic) morphemes. Following this, the initial đ- indicates a nominal, n- a noun modifier, b- proportion, v-~s- manner, and the vowels -ây~-ay proximal/medial, -âu~-ao indefinite, and -o medial/distal. However, the form kia is analyzed as consisting of only one morpheme. Overlaid on these elements are tones, which indicate contrastive distances increasingly further from the contextual position: ngang tone (closest), huyền tone (further), sắc or nặng tone (even further). Thus, đấy is more remote than đây, kìa more remote than kia, vậy more remote than vầy. There is an idiomatic expression where demonstratives with an even increasing distance modify the noun ngày "day(time)":

ngày kia, ngày kìa, ngày kía, ngày kịa, ngày kĩa "on and on into the future"

Syntactically, the demonstratives đó and kia may function as either nouns or as noun modifiers:

người đó
person that

là
be

anh nó
brother 3SG.PN

subj noun phrase
verb
obj noun phrase
"That person is his brother."

đó
that

là
be

anh nó
brother 3SG.PN

subj noun phrase
verb
obj noun phrase
"That is his brother."

The nominals đây, đấy, and đâu are only used as nouns typically denoting a space or time and cannot function as noun modifiers. Although they usually refer to position situated in time/space, the nominal deictics can be used to metaphorically refer to people, as in:

đây đi chợ, đấy có đi không?
this go market, that AFF go NEG
"I'm going to the market, what about you?"

In the sentence above (which would translate more literally as "This is going to the market, is that going or not?"), proximal đây is used to refer (metaphorically) to the speaker (as "I") while medial đấy is used to refer to the addressee (as "you"). The demonstrative noun modifiers này, (n)ấy, nọ, and nào can only modify nouns and cannot stand alone as nouns.

When referring to time, the distal demonstratives kia and nọ differ in directionality. Kia specifies a point remote either in the past or the future while nọ specifies only a remote point in the past:

- ngày kia "some day to come, the other day"
- ngày nọ "the other day"

The proportion demonstratives (bây, bấy, bao) refer to the extent of measurement of time or space. They precede the words they modify, such as giờ "time", nhiêu "(to have) much/many", lâu "(to be) long, (take a) long time":

- bây giờ "now, this time"
- bấy giờ "then, that time"
- bao giờ "when, what time"
- bây nhiêu "this much/many"
- bấy nhiêu "that much/many"
- bao nhiêu "how much/many"
- bấy lâu "all that long period, for that length of time"
- bao lâu "how long"
- bao ngày "how many days"
- bao lớn "how big"
- bấy xa "that far"

=== Numerals ===
Numerals (or numbers) consist of two types: cardinal numerals and ordinal numerals. When occurring in noun phrases, cardinal and ordinal numerals occur in different syntactic positions with respect to the head noun. The article below only shows the native Vietnamese numerals, remember that Sino-Vietnamese numerals will be used in certain cases.

==== Cardinal ====
Vietnamese numerals are a decimal system. "Zero" lacks a dedicated numeral with số không "empty number" (< số "number", không "empty") being used.

Numbers 1–99

Numerals are generally analytic, with multiples of ten following a regular pattern.

	base numeral	+ 10	× 10
1	một ~ mốt	mười một (11)	–
2	hai	mười hai (12)	hai mươi (20)
3	ba	mười ba (13)	ba mươi (30)
4	bốn, tư	mười bốn (14)	bốn mươi (40)
5	năm	mười lăm (15)	năm mươi (50)
6	sáu	mười sáu (16)	sáu mươi (60)
7	bảy or bẩy	mười bảy (17)	bảy mươi (70)
8	tám	mười tám (18)	tám mươi (80)
9	chín	mười chín (19)	chín mươi (90)
10	mười	–	(mười mươi) (100)

Additive compounds are formed by with mười- "10" initially and another numeral following: mười tám ("10" + "8" = "18"). Multiplicative compounds are formed with an order that is the reverse of the additive compounds, i.e. -mươi is preceded by another numeral: tám mươi ("8" x "10" = "80").

Consonantal and tonal alternations occur in some compound numerals. The numeral mười "10" in multiplicative compounds has a tonal change (huyền tone > ngang tone) to -mươi "times 10", as in:

bốn mươi "40" (instead of *bốn mười)

The numeral một "1" undergoes a tonal alternation (nặng tone > sắc tone) to mốt when it occurs after mươi (with ngang tone) in multiples of 10, as in:

bốn mươi mốt "41" (instead of *bốn mươi một)

The numeral năm "5" undergoes an initial consonant alternation (n > l) to lăm as the final element in additive compounds, as in:

mười lăm "15" (instead of *mười năm)
bốn mươi lăm "45" (instead of *bốn mươi năm)

Numbers 100–999

The Vietnamese word for hundred is trăm. Number formation generally follows the same logic as before, with the same consonantal and tonal shifts. However, with the numbers 101–109, 201–209 and so on, a placeholder lẻ ("odd") or linh is inserted to represent "zero tens."

100	một trăm	200	hai trăm	900	chín trăm
101	một trăm lẻ/linh một	201	hai trăm lẻ/linh một	901	chín trăm lẻ/linh một
102	một trăm lẻ/linh hai	202	hai trăm lẻ/linh hai	902	chín trăm lẻ/linh hai
105	một trăm lẻ/linh năm	205	hai trăm lẻ/linh năm	905	chín trăm lẻ/linh năm
110	một trăm mười	210	hai trăm mười	910	chín trăm mười
111	một trăm mười một	211	hai trăm mười một	911	chín trăm mười một
112	một trăm mười hai	212	hai trăm mười hai	912	chín trăm mười hai
115	một trăm mười lăm	215	hai trăm mười lăm	915	chín trăm mười lăm
120	một trăm hai mươi	220	hai trăm hai mươi	920	chín trăm hai mươi
121	một trăm hai mươi mốt	221	hai trăm hai mươi mốt	921	chín trăm hai mươi mốt
122	một trăm hai mươi hai	222	hai trăm hai mươi hai	922	chín trăm hai mươi hai
125	một trăm hai mươi lăm	225	hai trăm hai mươi lăm	925	chín trăm hai mươi lăm
155	một trăm năm mươi lăm	255	hai trăm năm mươi lăm	955	chín trăm năm mươi lăm

- "Lẻ" is more in the south of Vietnam, while "linh" is more common in the north of Vietnam.

Numbers 1,000–999,999

The Vietnamese word for thousand is ngàn (Southern) or nghìn (Northern). With the numbers 1,001–1,099, 2,001–2,099 and so on, the empty hundreds place must be specified with không trăm ("zero hundreds").

1,000	một ngàn/nghìn	10,000	mười ngàn/nghìn	21,000	hai mươi mốt ngàn/nghìn	155,000	một trăm năm mươi lăm ngàn/nghìn
1,001	một ngàn/nghìn không trăm lẻ/linh một	10,001	mười ngàn/nghìn không trăm lẻ/linh một	21,001	hai mươi mốt ngàn/nghìn không trăm lẻ/linh một	155,001	một trăm năm mươi lăm ngàn/nghìn không trăm lẻ/linh một
1,021	một ngàn/nghìn không trăm hai mươi mốt	10,021	mười ngàn/nghìn không trăm hai mươi mốt	21,021	hai mươi mốt ngàn/nghìn không trăm hai mươi mốt	155,021	một trăm năm mươi lăm ngàn/nghìn không trăm hai mươi mốt
1,055	một ngàn/nghìn không trăm năm mươi lăm	10,055	mười ngàn/nghìn không trăm năm mươi lăm	21,055	hai mươi mốt ngàn/nghìn không trăm năm mươi lăm	155,055	một trăm năm mươi lăm ngàn/nghìn không trăm năm mươi lăm
1,100	một ngàn/nghìn một trăm	10,100	mười ngàn/nghìn một trăm	21,100	hai mươi mốt ngàn/nghìn một trăm	155,100	một trăm năm mươi lăm ngàn/nghìn một trăm
1,101	một ngàn/nghìn một trăm lẻ/linh một	10,101	mười ngàn/nghìn một trăm lẻ/linh một	21,101	hai mươi mốt ngàn/nghìn một trăm lẻ/linh một	155,101	một trăm năm mươi lăm ngàn/nghìn một trăm lẻ/linh một
1,121	một ngàn/nghìn một trăm hai mươi mốt	10,121	mười ngàn/nghìn một trăm hai mươi mốt	21,121	hai mươi mốt ngàn/nghìn một trăm hai mươi mốt	155,121	một trăm năm mươi lăm ngàn/nghìn một trăm hai mươi mốt

- "Ngàn" is more in the south of Vietnam, while "nghìn" is more common in the north of Vietnam.

Numbers 1,000,000 and Above

The word for "million" is triệu. The word for "billion" is tỉ. Above this, combinations of ngàn/nghìn, triệu and tỉ must be used.

1 million	một triệu	1 × 10^{18}	một tỉ tỉ
1 billion	một tỉ	1 × 10^{21}	một ngàn tỉ tỉ
1 trillion	một ngàn tỉ	1 × 10^{24}	một triệu tỉ tỉ
1 × 10^{15}	một triệu tỉ	1 × 10^{27}	một tỉ tỉ tỉ

==== Ordinal ====
Ordinal numerals are formed by adding the thứ- ordinal prefix to cardinal numerals: thứ- + mười "ten" = thứ mười "tenth".

Other examples include:

1. thứ nhất "first"
2. thứ hai (or thứ nhì) "second"
3. thứ ba "third"
4. thứ bốn (or thứ tư) "fourth"

== See also ==
- Vietnamese morphology
- Vietnamese phonology
- Vietnamese language
- Vietnamese punctuation

== Bibliography ==
- Beatty, Mark Stanton. (1990). Vietnamese phrase structure: An x-bar approach. (Master's thesis, University of Texas at Arlington).
- Behrens, Leila. (2003). Classifiers, metonymies, and genericity: A study of Vietnamese. In C. Zelinsky-Wibbelt (Ed.), Text, context, concepts (pp. 65–125). Text, translation, computational processing (No. 4). Berlin: Mouton de Gruyter.
- Cao Xuân Hạo. (1988). The count/mass distinction in Vietnamese and the concept of ‘classifier’. Zeischrift für Phonetik, Sprachwissenschaft und Kommunikationsforschung, 1 (41), 38–47.
- Daley, Karen Ann. (1998). Vietnamese classifiers in narrative texts. Arlington, TX: The Summer Institute of Linguistics and The University of Texas at Arlington.
- Emeneau, M. B. (1951). Studies in Vietnamese (Annamese) grammar. University of California publications in linguistics (Vol. 8). Berkeley: University of California Press.
- Löbel, Elisabeth. (1999). Classifiers vs. genders and noun classes: A case study in Vietnamese. In B. Unterbeck & M. Rissanen (Eds.), Gender in grammar and cognition, I (approaches to gender) (pp. 259–319). Berlin: Mouton de Gruyter.
- Nguyễn, Đình-Hoà. (1957). Classifiers in Vietnamese. Word, 13 (1), 124–152.
- Nguyễn, Đình-Hoà. (1997). Vietnamese: Tiếng Việt không son phấn. Amsterdam: John Benjamins Publishing Company.
- Nguyễn, Phú Phong. (1992). Vietnamese demonstratives revisited. Mon-Khmer Studies, 20, 127–136.
- Nguyễn Tài Cẩn. (1975). Từ loại danh từ trong tiếng Việt hiện đại [The word class of nouns in modern Vietnamese]. Hanoi: Khoa học Xã hội.
- Nguyễn, Hùng Tưởng. (2004). The structure of the Vietnamese noun phrase. (Doctoral dissertation, Boston University, Boston, MA).
- Pham, Hoa. (2002). Gender in addressing and self-reference in Vietnamese: Variation and change. In M. Hellinger & H. Bußmann (Eds.), Gender across languages: The linguistic representation of women and men (Vol. 2, pp. 281–312). IMPACT: Studies in language society (No. 10). John Benjamins.
- Shum, Shu-ying. (1965). A transformational study of Vietnamese syntax. (Doctoral dissertation, Indiana University).
- Thompson, Laurence C. (1963). The problem of the word in Vietnamese. Word, 19 (1), 39–52.
- Thompson, Laurence C. (1965). Nuclear models in Vietnamese immediate-constituent analysis. Language, 41 (4), 610–618.
- Thompson, Laurence C. (1991). A Vietnamese reference grammar. Seattle: University of Washington Press. Honolulu: University of Hawaii Press. (Original work published 1965).
- Uỷ ban Khoa học Xã hội Việt Nam. (1983). Ngữ-pháp tiếng Việt [Vietnamese grammar]. Hanoi: Khoa học Xã hội.
