= Register complex =

In linguistics, a register complex is a combination of phonation type, pitch, length, vowel quality and/or other variants that function dependently as distinguishing features within a single phonological system. In languages employing register systems, differences in a distinguishing feature correlate relative to the quality of another distinguishing feature.

For instance, in a system where pitch, voice quality and stress timing are distinguishing features, the meaning of a vowel-consonant cluster like "Pai" (as in the English word "Pie") may depend on whether the cluster is voiced in a high, medium or low pitch relative to the clearness, breathiness and glottal quality of speech as well as relative to the duration of the cluster relative to other neighboring clusters. Thus, "Pai" voiced in a high tone with a breathy quality and unstressed along with other unstressed clusters would connote a different meaning if any of the three features changed relative to other features.

Many register languages are tonal. However, tone is not a universal distinguishing feature among register systems and register complexes are not a component of most tonal languages. In fact, tonal languages can employ either a register tone system or a contour tone system. Mandarin has a contour tone system whose distinguishing feature of the tones are their shifts in pitch (their pitch shapes or contours, such as rising, falling, dipping, or peaking), rather than simply their pitch relative to one another as in a register tone system. Register tone systems are found throughout Africa, such as in the Bantu languages. In some register tone systems, there is a default tone (usually low in a two-tone system or mid in a three-tone system), which is more common and less salient than other tones. There are also languages that combine register and contour tones, such as the Kru languages, but in such cases, the register tones may be analysed as being 'level' (unvarying pitch) contour tones. Furthermore, often the term 'register', when it is not in the phrase 'register tone', indicates vowel phonation combined with tone in a single phonological system. Burmese, Khmer and possibly Vietnamese are register languages. Burmese is usually considered a tonal language and Khmer a vowel-phonation language, but in both cases, differences in relative pitch or pitch contours are correlated with vowel phonation and so neither exists independently.
