= Vietnamese phonology =

Phonology of the Vietnamese language

The phonology of Vietnamese features 19 consonant phonemes, with 5 additional consonant phonemes used in Vietnamese's Southern dialect, and 4 exclusive to the Northern dialect. Vietnamese also has 14 vowel nuclei, and 6 tones that are integral to the interpretation of the language. Older interpretations of Vietnamese tones differentiated between "sharp" and "heavy" entering and departing tones. This article is a technical description of the sound system of the Vietnamese language, including phonetics and phonology. Two main varieties of Vietnamese, Hanoi and Saigon, which are slightly different from each other, are described below.

== Initial consonants ==
Initial consonants which exist only in the Northern dialect are in red, while those that exist only in the Southern dialect are in blue.

		Labial	Dental/ Alveolar	Retroflex	(Alveolo-) palatal	Velar	Glottal
Nasal		m	n		ɲ	ŋ	
Plosive	tenuis	(p)	t	ʈ	c	k	(ʔ)
Plosive	aspirated		tʰ				
Implosive		ɓ	ɗ				
Affricate					(tɕ) (Note: Some previous treatments such as that of Thompson (1965) recognize an unaspirated, unaffricated palatal stop /c/. However, in the speech of many younger Vietnamese native speakers from Hanoi, this segment is consistently realized as an affricate [tɕ], a well-attested areal feature (Harris 2006). The tongue body contacts the alveolar or post-alveolar region during the production of both the palatal nasal [ɲ] and the palatal affricate [tɕ] in initial position (Henderson 1965).)		
Fricative	voiceless	f	s	ʂ		x	h
Fricative	voiced	v	z			ɣ	
Approximant			l		j	w	
Rhotic			r				

- /w/ is the only consonant sound permitted to form consonant clusters with other consonants.
- In many regions of Northern Vietnam, the pair /n/ and /l/ have merged into one, they are no longer two opposing phonemes. Some native Vietnamese speakers who lack linguistic knowledge stigmatize pronouncing the initial consonant of a word whose orthographic form begins with the letter l as /n/ or n as /l/, calling it nói ngọng (lit. 'lisping'). The phenomenon of no longer distinguishing /n/ from /l/ in words whose orthographic form begins with the letter n or l has three manifestations:
1. The initial consonant of all words whose orthographic form begins with n or l is /n/.
2. The initial consonant of all words is /l/.
3. In some words, the initial consonant corresponding to the letter n at the beginning of the spelling form of the word is /n/, with l being /l/, in some other words the sound corresponding to n is /l/, with l being /n/.
- In Northern dialects, some words have the initial consonant as the voiced palatal nasal /ɲ/, such as nhuộm, nhức, nhỏ (nhỏ in nhỏ giọt, not nhỏ in nhỏ bé), nhổ, nhốt, have phonetic variants with the initial consonant /z/. This /z/ sound is written with the letter d or gi or r depending on the word (at least one of those three letters, sometimes two, or even all three).
- Some words with the initial consonant being the voiced velar nasal /ŋ/ also have phonetic variants with the initial consonant being the voiced velar fricative /ɣ/, which are used in some places in the North. For example, the words ngáy (ngáy in ngáy ngủ), ngẫm (ngẫm in suy ngẫm) also have phonetic variants gáy, gẫm.
- In Northern dialects, the voiceless bilabial plosive /p/ is only the initial consonant in a few loanwords from other languages, mainly from French. In writing, the sound /p/ is written with the letter p, as in sâm panh, derived from French champagne. Not every word in another language that has the initial consonant /p/ have the corresponding Vietnamese loanword with the initial consonant /p/. In some words, the sound /p/ is replaced by the sound /ɓ/. For example, both syllables of the word búp bê (derived from the French word poupée /pu.pe/) have the initial consonant /ɓ/, not /p/. In Southern dialects, the initial consonant of words whose spelling form begins with the letter p is /ɓ/ in many speakers.
- The glottalized stops are preglottalized and voiced: [ʔɓ, ʔɗ] (the glottis is always closed before the oral closure). This glottal closure is often not released before the release of the oral closure, resulting in the characteristic implosive pronunciation. However, sometimes the glottal closure is released prior to the oral release in which case the stops are pronounced [ʔb, ʔd]. Therefore, the primary characteristic is preglottalization with implosion being secondary.
- /ɓ, m/ are bilabial, while /f, v/ are labiodental.
- /t, tʰ/ are denti-alveolar ([t̪, t̪ʰ]), while /ɗ, n/ are apico-alveolar.
- /c, ɲ/ are phonetically lamino-alveolar.
- /ʈ, c/ are often slightly affricated [ʈ͡ʂ, t͡ɕ], but they are unaspirated.
- A glottal stop [ʔ] is inserted before words that begin with a vowel or /w/ in Northern dialects:

ăn	'to eat'	/ăn/	→	[ʔăn]
uỷ	'to delegate'	/wi/	→	[ʔwi˧˩˧]

=== Hanoi initials ===
- /s, z/ are denti-lamino-alveolar: [s̪, z̪].
- /l/ is apico-alveolar: [l̪].
- d, gi and r are all pronounced /z/.
- ch and tr are both pronounced /tɕ/, while x and s are both pronounced /s/.
- The highly salient (and socially stigmatized) merger of /l/ and /n/ as mentioned above, characteristic of the speech of many lower- and working-class Vietnamese in the Red River Delta, is sometimes consciously manipulated to humorous and/or pejorative effect in colloquial Hanoi speech.
- /p, j, r/ occur in a small number of foreign (mainly French) loans, e.g. [pan˧] < panne 'breakdown', [ɣa˧ ra˧] < garage, [bi˧ ja˧] < billiard. For many speakers, however, /p/ is realized as [b/ɓ] and /r/ as [z].
- There are no retroflex consonants /ʈʂ/, /ʂ/, /ʐ/; instead there are palato-alveolar consonants: /tʃ/, /ʃ/, /ʒ/ in spelling pronunciations taught in schools.

=== Saigon initials ===
- /s/ is apico-alveolar [s̺].
- /l/ is palatalized lamino-alveolar: [lʲ].
- Some people pronounce d as [j], and gi as [z] in situations where the distinction is necessary. Most people pronounce both as [j].
- Historically, /v/ is pronounced [j] in common speech, merging with d and gi. However, it is becoming distinct and pronounced as [v], especially in careful speech or when reading a text. In traditional performance including Cải lương, Đờn ca tài tử, Hát bội (Tuồng) and some old speakers of Overseas Vietnamese, it is pronounced as consonant cluster [bj], [βj] or [vj]. In loanwords, it is pronounced [v], [ʋ] or [w], for example, va li is pronounced [vaː˧ lɪi̯˧], [ʋaː˧ lɪi̯˧] or [waː˧ lɪi̯˧].
- Historically, a distinction is made between ch /c/ and tr /ʈ/, as well as between x /s/ and s /ʂ/. However, in many speakers, these two pairs are becoming merged as /c/ and /s/ respectively.
- In southern speech, the phoneme /r/, generally represented in Vietnamese linguistics by the letter ⟨r⟩, has a number of variant pronunciations depending on the speaker. A person can also have many pronunciations. It may occur as a retroflex fricative [ʐ], an alveolar approximant [ɹ], an alveolar flap [ɾ], a trill [r], or a tapped fricative/fricative trill [ɾ̞, r̝]. In the border area between Ho Chi Minh City and Long An province (Bình Chánh, Cần Giuộc, Cần Đước), the letter ⟨r⟩ is pronounced as a palatal approximant [j]. In many areas in the Mekong Delta, the letter ⟨r⟩ is pronounced as a velar fricative [ɣ].

==== Simplification of consonant clusters /Cw/ in southern dialects ====
As mentioned above, the only cluster in Vietnamese is /Cw/ in which /C/ is a consonant. Although this cluster tends to be retained by many young urban people in southern Vietnam, especially in Ho Chi Minh City and surrounding areas, it is generally reduced to one element in southern dialects. Depending on which consonant forms the cluster /Cw/, there are two patterns in this simplification process. In one pattern the consonant is deleted and /w/ remains. In the other, /w/ is deleted while the consonant remains:

- In southern speech, /kw/, /hw/, and /ʔw/ are usually pronounced [w], including among educated urban speakers. The cluster go /ɣw/ is very rare, seen only in goá /ɣwa˧˥/ ‘widowed’. The cluster ngw /ŋw/ shows greater loss in rural varieties than in urban ones.

u-/o-	/ʔw/	→	u/o	/w/
hu-/ho-	/hw/	→	u/o	/w/
qu-	/kw/	→	u/o	/w/
go-	/ɣw/	→	o	/w/
ngu-/ngo-	/ŋw/	→	u/o	/w/

However, they are becoming distinct and pronounced as [kw] or [w], [hw], [ʔw], [ɣw], and [ŋw] respectively, especially in formal speech or when reading a text.

- In informal speech, the voiceless velar fricative /x/ (represented by the letter kh) is often transformed into the corresponding voiceless bilabial and labiodental consonants /ɸ/, /f/ and the prevocalic /w/ is deleted, for example: cá khoai is pronounced as cá phai, khóa máy is pronounced as phá máy, khỏe không? is pronounced as phẻ không?. This pronunciation is observed only in rural southern dialects, and it does not occur in the speech of educated speakers.
- There are only a few words where the bilabial and labiodental consonants /m, ɓ, f, v/ are followed by the prevocalic /w/. Most of them are French loanwords, for example: tiền boa (pourboire), đậu pơ-ti-poa (petit pois), xe buýt (bus), vải voan (voile). The initial consonant is kept and the prevocalic /w/ is lost and pronounced as: tiền bo, đậu bo, xe bít, vải von.
- After the consonant clusters of the remaining articulators (alveolar, postalveolar, palatal consonants) followed by the prevocalic /w/, the initial consonant is kept and the prevocalic /w/ is lost as above, for example: vô duyên is pronounced as vô diên, cái loa (hát) is pronounced as cái la.

=== Comparison of initials ===
The table below summarizes these sound correspondences:

Diaphoneme	Hanoi	Saigon	Example		
Diaphoneme	Hanoi	Saigon	word	Hanoi	Saigon
/v/	/v/	/j/ or /v/	vợ 'wife'	[və˨˩ˀ]	[jə˨˧] or [və˨˧]
/z/	/z/	/j/	da 'skin'	[za˧]	[ja˧]
/z/	/z/	/j/	gia 'to add'	[za˧]	[ja˧]
/r/	/z/	/r/	ra 'to go out'	[za˧]	[ra˧]
/c/	/c/	/c/	chẻ 'split'	[t͡ɕɛ˧˩]	[cɛ˩˥]
/ʈ/	/c/	/ʈ/ or /c/	trẻ 'young'	[t͡ɕɛ˧˩]	[ʈɛ˩˥] or [cɛ˩˥]
/s/	/s/	/s/	xinh 'beautiful'	[sɪŋ̟˧]	[sɪ̈n˧]
/ʂ/	/s/	/ʂ/ or /s/	sinh 'born'	[sɪŋ̟˧]	[ʂɪ̈n˧] or [sɪ̈n˧]

== Vowels ==
=== Vowel nuclei ===
Vowel chart of Hanoi monophthongs according to Kirby (2011:384)

Vowel chart of Hanoi diphthongs according to Kirby (2011:384)

Vietnamese vowels
	Front	Central	Back
Centering	iə ⟨ia~iê⟩	ɯə ⟨ưa~ươ⟩	uə ⟨ua~uô⟩
Close	/i/ ⟨i, y⟩	/ɯ/ ⟨ư⟩	/u/ ⟨u⟩
Close-mid/ Mid	/e/ ⟨ê⟩	/ɤ/ ⟨ơ⟩	/o/ ⟨ô⟩
Close-mid/ Mid	/e/ ⟨ê⟩	/ɤ̆/ (/ʌ/) ⟨â⟩	/o/ ⟨ô⟩
Open-mid/ Open	/ɛ/ ⟨e⟩	/a/ ⟨a⟩	/ɔ/ ⟨o⟩
Open-mid/ Open	/ɛ/ ⟨e⟩	/ă/ (/ɐ/) ⟨ă⟩	/ɔ/ ⟨o⟩

The IPA chart of vowel nuclei above is based on the sounds in Hanoi Vietnamese; other regions may have slightly different inventories. Vowel nuclei consist of monophthongs (simple vowels) and three centering diphthongs. The Standard Vietnamese vowel inventory comprises 9 monophthong qualities /i e ɛ a ɤ ɯ u o ɔ/ and three falling diphthongs /iə ɯə uə/, although other acoustic analysis suggests eleven monophthongs /i e ɛ a ɐ ʌ ɤ ɯ u o ɔ/ and three diphthongs /ie/, /ɯɤ/ and /uo/.

- All vowels are unrounded except for the four back rounded vowels: /u, o, ɔ, uə̯/.
- In the South, the high vowels /i, ɨ, u/ are all diphthongized in open syllables: [ɪi̯, ɯ̽ɯ̯, ʊu̯], Ba Vì [baː˧ vɪi̯˩].
- /ə̆/ and /ă/ are pronounced shorter than the other vowels. These short vowels only occur in closed syllables.
- The vowels /ɛː/ and /ɔː/ are marginal. As with the other short/long vowel pairs, short and long /ɛ/ and /ɔ/ are only distinguished in closed syllables. For some speakers the distinction may be one of vowel quality or of the articulation of the syllable coda in addition to or instead of vowel quantity.
- /ɯ/: Many descriptions, such as Thompson, Nguyễn (1970), Nguyễn (1997), consider this vowel to be close back unrounded: [ɯ]. However, Han's instrumental analysis indicates that it is more central [ɨ] than back. Hoang (1965), Brunelle (2003) and Phạm (2006) also transcribe this vowel as central. But according to Kirby (2011), /ɯ/ is frequently realized as mid centralized [ɯ̌], leading some authors to transcribe it as [ɨ] (Han (1966); Brunelle (2003)).

=== Closing sequences ===
In Vietnamese, vowel nuclei are able to combine with offglides /j/ or /w/ to form closing diphthongs and triphthongs. Below is a chart listing the closing sequences of general northern speech.

	/w/ offglide		/j/ offglide	
	Front	Central		Back
Centering	/iə̯w/ ⟨iêu⟩	/ɯə̯w/ ⟨ươu⟩	/ɯə̯j/ ⟨ươi⟩	/uə̯j/ ⟨uôi⟩
Close	/iw/ ⟨iu⟩	/ɯw/ ⟨ưu⟩	/ɯj/ ⟨ưi⟩	/uj/ ⟨ui⟩
Close-mid/ Mid	/ew/ ⟨êu⟩	– /ɤ̆w/ ⟨âu⟩	/ɤj/ ⟨ơi⟩ /ɤ̆j/ ⟨ây⟩	/oj/ ⟨ôi⟩
Open-mid/ Open	/ɛw/ ⟨eo⟩	/aw/ ⟨ao⟩ /ăw/ ⟨au⟩	/aj/ ⟨ai⟩ /ăj/ ⟨ay⟩	/ɔj/ ⟨oi⟩

Thompson (1965) says that in Hanoi, words spelled with ưu and ươu are pronounced /iw, iəw/, respectively, whereas other dialects in the Tonkin delta pronounce them as /ɯw/ and /ɯəw/. This observation is also made by Kirby (2011).

== Finals ==
When stops /p, t, k/ occur at the end of words, they have no audible release ([p̚, t̚, k̚]):

đáp	'to reply'	/ɗap/	→	[ɗap̚]
mát	'cool'	/mat/	→	[mat̚]
khác	'different'	/xak/	→	[xak̚]

When the velar consonants /k, ŋ/ are after /u, o, ɔ/, they are articulated with a simultaneous bilabial closure [k͡p̚, ŋ͡m] (i.e. doubly articulated) or are strongly labialized [k̚ʷ, ŋʷ].

đục	'murky'	/ɗuk/	→	[ɗuk͡p̚], [ɗʊk̚ʷ]
độc	'poison'	/ɗok/	→	[ɗə̆wk͡p̚], [ɗə̆wk̚ʷ]
đọc	'to read'	/ɗɔk/	→	[ɗăwk͡p̚], [ɗăwk̚ʷ]
ung	'cancer'	/uŋ/	→	[uŋ͡m], [ʊŋʷ]
ông	'man'/'grandfather'	/oŋ/	→	[ə̆wŋ͡m], [ə̆wŋʷ]
ong	'bee'	/ɔŋ/	→	[ăwŋ͡m], [ăwŋʷ]

=== Hanoi finals ===
==== Analysis of final ch, nh ====
The pronunciation of syllable-final ch and nh in Hanoi Vietnamese has had different analyses. One analysis, that of Thompson (1965), has them as being phonemes /c, ɲ/, where /c/ contrasts with both syllable-final t /t/ and c /k/, and /ɲ/ contrasts with syllable-final n /n/ and ng /ŋ/. Final /c, ɲ/ is, then, identified with syllable-initial /c, ɲ/.

Another analysis has final ⟨ch⟩ and ⟨nh⟩ as representing different spellings of the velar phonemes /k/ and /ŋ/ that occur after upper front vowels /i/ (orthographic ⟨i⟩) and /e/ (orthographic ⟨ê⟩). This analysis interprets orthographic ⟨ach⟩ and ⟨anh⟩ as an underlying /ɛ/, which becomes phonetically open and diphthongized: /ɛk/ → [ăjk̟̚], /ɛŋ/ → [ăjŋ̟]. (Note: Although there are some words where orthographic ⟨c⟩ and ⟨ng⟩ occur after /ɛ/, these words are few and are mostly loanwords or onomatopoeia.) This diphthongization also affects ⟨êch⟩ and ⟨ênh⟩: /ek/ → [ə̆jk̟̚], /eŋ/ → [ə̆jŋ̟].

Arguments for the second analysis include the limited distribution of final [c] and [ɲ], the gap in the distribution of [k] and [ŋ] which do not occur after [i] and [e], the pronunciation of ⟨ach⟩ and ⟨anh⟩ as [ɛc] and [ɛɲ] in certain conservative central dialects, and the patterning of [k]~[c] and [ŋ]~[ɲ] in certain reduplicated words. Additionally, final [c] is not articulated as far forward as the initial [c]: [c] and [ɲ] are pre-velar [k̟, ŋ̟] with no alveolar contact.

The first analysis closely follows the surface pronunciation of a slightly different Hanoi dialect than the second. In this dialect, the /a/ in /ac/ and /aɲ/ is not diphthongized but is actually articulated more forward, approaching a front vowel [æ]. This results in a three-way contrast between the rimes ăn [æ̈n] vs. anh [æ̈ɲ] vs. ăng [æ̈ŋ]. For this reason, a separate phonemic /ɲ/ is posited.

==== Table of Hanoi finals ====
The following rimes ending with velar consonants have been diphthongized in the Hanoi dialect, but /i/, /u/ and /ɯ/ are more open:

ong, oc	/awŋ/, /awk/	→	[ăwŋ͡m], [ăwk͡p̚]
ông, ôc	/əwŋ/, /əwk/	→	[ə̆wŋ͡m], [ə̆wk͡p̚]
ung, uc	/uŋ/, /uk/	→	[ʊŋ͡m], [ʊk͡p̚]
ưng, ưc, ưn, ưt	/ɯŋ/, /ɯk/, /ɯn/, /ɯt/	→	[ɯ̽ŋ], [ɯ̽k̟̚], [ɯ̽n], [ɯ̽t̚]
anh, ach	/ɛŋ/, /ɛk/	→	[ăjŋ̟], [ăjk̟̚]
ênh, êch	/eŋ/, /ek/	→	[ə̆jŋ̟], [ə̆jk̟̚]
inh, ich	/iŋ/, /ik/	→	[ɪŋ̟], [ɪk̟̚]

With the above phonemic analyses, the following is a table of rimes ending in /n, t, ŋ, k/ in the Hanoi dialect:

	/ɐ/	/a/	/ɛ/	/ɔ/, /aw/	/ʌ/	/ɤ/	/e/	/o/	/i/	/ɯ/	/u/	/iə̯/	/ɯə̯/	/uə̯/
/n/	ăn	an	en	on	ân	ơn	ên	ôn	in	ưn	un	iên	ươn	uôn
/t/	ăt	at	et	ot	ât	ơt	êt	ôt	it	ưt	ut	iêt	ươt	uôt
/ŋ/	ăng	ang	anh	ong	âng	–	ênh	ông	inh	ưng	ung	iêng	ương	uông
/k/	ăc	ac	ach	oc	âc	–	êch	ôc	ich	ưc	uc	iêc	ươc	uôc

=== Saigon finals ===
==== Merger of finals ====
While the variety of Vietnamese spoken in Hanoi has retained finals faithfully from Middle Vietnamese, the variety spoken in Ho Chi Minh City has drastically changed its finals. Rimes ending in /k, ŋ/ merged with those ending in /t, n/, respectively, so they are always pronounced /t, n/, respectively, after the short front vowels /i, e, a/ (only when /a/ is before "nh"). However, they are always pronounced /k, ŋ/ after the other vowels /u, uː, o, ɔ, iː, ɨː, ɨ, aw, a, aː, ɛ, ə, əː/. After rounded vowels /aw, u, o/, many speakers close their lips, i.e. they pronounce /k, ŋ/ as [k͡p, ŋ͡m]. Subsequently, vowels of rimes ending in labiovelars have been diphthongized, while vowels of rimes ending in alveolar have been centralized. Otherwise, some Southern speakers distinguish /k, ŋ/ and /t, n/ after /u, uː, o, ɔ, iː, ɨː, ɨ, aw, a, aː, ɛ, ə, əː/ in formal speech, but there are no Southern speakers who pronounce "ch" and "nh" at the end of syllables as /k, ŋ/.

==== Table of Saigon finals ====
The short back vowels in the rimes have been diphthongized and centralized, meanwhile, the consonants have been labialized. Similarly, the short front vowels have been centralized which are realized as central vowels /ă, ə, ɨ/ and the "unspecified" consonants have been affected by coronal spreading from the preceding front vowels which are surfaced as coronals (alveolar) /n, t/.

ung, uc	/uŋ/, /uk/	→	[ʊwŋ͡m], [ʊwk͡p̚]
ông, ôc	/oŋ/, /ok/	→	[ăwŋ͡m], [ăwk͡p̚]
ong, oc	/ɔŋ/, /ɔk/	→	[ăwŋ͡m], [ăwk͡p̚]
anh, ach	/an/, /at/	→	[ăn], [ăt̚]
ênh, êch	/en/, /et/	→	[ɤn], [ɤt̚]
in ~ inh, it ~ ich	/in/, /it/	→	[ɪ̈n], [ɪ̈t̚]
um, up	/um/, /up/	→	[ʊm], [ʊp̚]
ưng ~ ưn, ưc ~ ưt	/ɨŋ/, /ɨk/	→	[ɯ̽ŋ], [ɯ̽k̟̚]

The other closed dialects (Huế, Quảng Nam, Bình Định) which have also been merged in codas, but some vowels are pronounced differently in some dialects:

	Huế	Quảng Nam	Bình Định	Ho Chi Minh City
ung, uc	[ʊwŋ͡m], [ʊwk͡p̚]	[ʊwŋ͡m], [ʊwk͡p̚]	[ʊwŋ͡m], [ʊwk͡p̚]	[ʊwŋ͡m], [ʊwk͡p̚]
un, ut	[uːŋ͡m], [uːk͡p̚]	[uːŋ͡m], [uːk͡p̚]	[ʊwŋ͡m], [ʊwk͡p̚]	[ʊwŋ͡m], [ʊwk͡p̚]
ênh, êch	[ən], [ət̚]	[ən], [ət̚]	[ən], [ət̚]	[ɤːn], [ɤːt̚]
ên, êt	[eːn], [eːt̚]	[eːn], [eːt̚]	[eːn], [eːt̚]	[ɤːn], [ɤːt̚]
inh, ich	[ɪ̈n], [ɪ̈t̚]	[ɪ̈n], [ɪ̈t̚]	[ɪ̈n], [ɪ̈t̚]	[ɪ̈n], [ɪ̈t̚]
in, it	[in], [it̚]	[in], [it̚]	[in], [it̚]	[ɪ̈n], [ɪ̈t̚]

The ông, ôc rimes are merged into ong, oc as [ăwŋ͡m], [ăwk͡p̚] in many Southern speakers, but not with ôn, ôt as pronounced [oːŋ͡m], [oːk͡p̚]. The oong, ooc and eng, ec rimes are few and are mostly loanwords or onomatopoeia. The ôông, ôôc (oong, ooc, eng, ec, êng, êc as well) rimes are the "archaic" form before becoming ông, ôc by diphthongization and still exist in the North Central dialect in many placenames. The articulation of these rimes in the North Central dialect are [oːŋ], [oːk̚] without a simultaneous bilabial closure or labialization.

on, ot	/ɔn/, /ɔt/	→	[ɔːŋ], [ɔːk]
oong, ooc	/ɔŋ/, /ɔk/	→	[ɔːŋ], [ɔːk]
ôn, ôt	/on/, /ot/	→	[oːŋ͡m], [oːk͡p̚].
ôông, ôôc	/oŋ/, /ok/	→	[oːŋ͡m], [oːk͡p̚].
ong, oc	/awŋ/, /awk/	→	[ăwŋ͡m], [ăwk͡p̚]
ông, ôc	/əwŋ/, /əwk/	→	[ăwŋ͡m], [ăwk͡p̚]

With the above phonemic analyses, the following is a table of rimes ending in /n, t, ŋ, k, ŋ͡m, k͡p/ in the Ho Chi Minh City dialect:

	/ɔ/, /aw/	/o/	/u/	/ă/	/a/	/ə̆/	/ə/	/ɨ/	/ɛ/	/e/	/i/	/uː/	/ɨː/	/iː/
/n/				– **anh**			ên **ênh**	in **inh**						
/t/				– **ach**			êt **êch**	it **ich**						
/ŋ/	**on** oong			**ăn** ăng	**an** ang	**ân** âng	**ơn** –	**ưn** ưng	**en** eng			**uôn** uông	**ươn** ương	**iên** iêng
/k/	**ot** ooc			**ăt** ăc	**at** ac	**ât** âc	**ơt** –	**ưt** ưc	**et** ec			**uôt** uôc	**ươt** ươc	**iêt** iêc
/ŋ͡m/	– ong / **ông**	**ôn** ôông	**un** ung											
/k͡p/	– oc / **ôc**	**ôt** ôôc	**ut** uc											
Combinations that have changed their pronunciation due to merger are bolded.

== Tone ==
Vietnamese vowels are all pronounced with an inherent tone. Tones differ in

- pitch
- length
- contour melody
- intensity
- phonation (with or without accompanying constricted vocal cords)

Unlike many Native American, African, and Chinese languages, Vietnamese tones do not rely solely on pitch contour. Vietnamese often uses instead a register complex (which is a combination of phonation type, pitch, length, vowel quality, etc.). Thus, it may be more accurate to categorize Vietnamese as a register language rather than a "pure" tonal language.

There is much variation among speakers concerning how tone is realized phonetically. There are differences between varieties of Vietnamese spoken in the major geographic areas (northern, central, southern) and smaller differences within the major areas (e.g. Hanoi vs. other northern varieties). In addition, there seems to be variation among individuals. More research is needed to determine the remaining details of tone realization and the variation among speakers.

=== Six-tone analysis ===
In the modern Vietnamese orthography, tone is indicated by diacritics written above or below the vowel, of which there are six categories (including the null diacritic). The six-tone analysis corresponds most closely with the way the Vietnamese language is written, perceived and taught, whether to those in the school system or to learners of Vietnamese as a foreign language.

==== Northern varieties ====
The six tones in the Hanoi and other northern varieties are:

Tone name	Tone ID	VNI/Telex/VIQR	Description	Chao Tone Contour	Diacritic	Example
ngang 'flat'	A1	[default]	mid level	˧ (33)	◌	ba ('three')
huyền 'deep'	A2	2 / f / `	low falling (breathy)	˨˩ (21) or (31)	◌̀	bà ('grandmother')
sắc 'sharp'	B1	1 / s / '	mid rising, tense	˧˥ (35)	◌́	bá ('to embrace')
nặng 'heavy'	B2	5 / j / .	mid falling, glottalized, heavy	˧ˀ˨ʔ (3ˀ2ʔ) or ˧ˀ˩ʔ (3ˀ1ʔ)	◌̣	bạ ('to strengthen')
hỏi 'asking'	C1	3 / r / ?	mid falling(-rising), emphasis	˧˩˧ (313) or (323) or (31)	◌̉	bả ('bait')
ngã 'tumbling'	C2	4 / x / ~	mid rising, glottalized	˧ˀ˥ (3ˀ5) or (4ˀ5)	◌̃	bã ('residue')

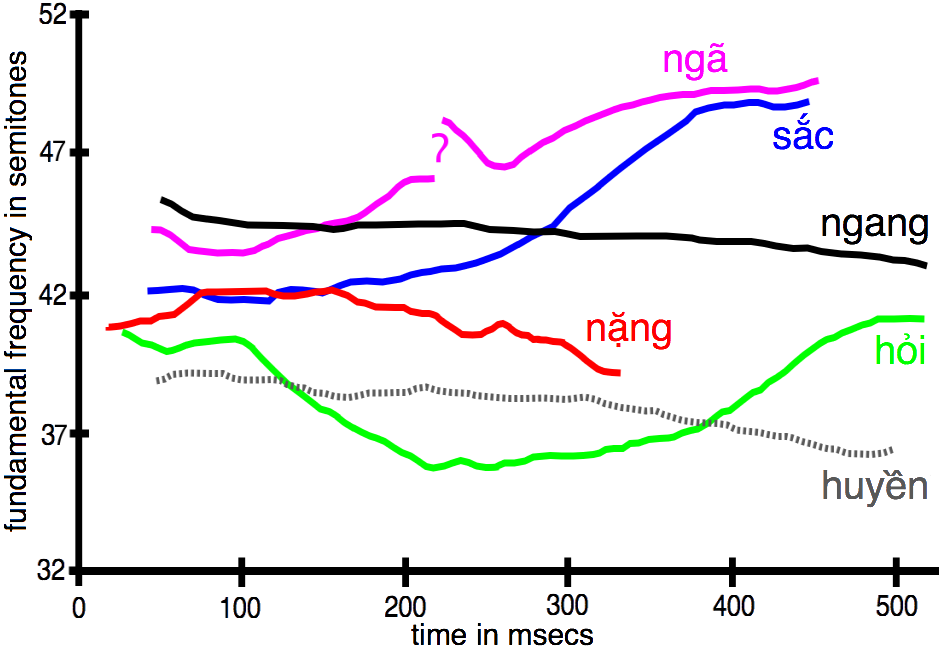
Northern Vietnamese (non-Hanoi) tones as uttered by a male speaker in isolation. From Nguyễn & Edmondson (1998)

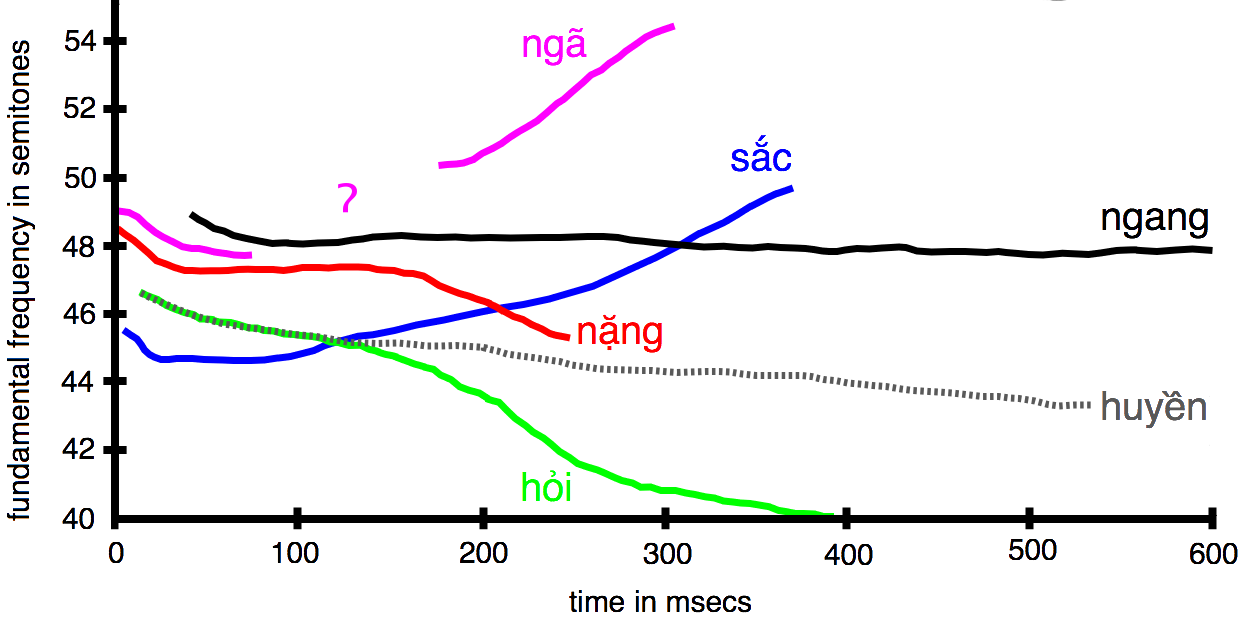
Hanoi tones as uttered by a female speaker in isolation. From Nguyễn & Edmondson (1998)

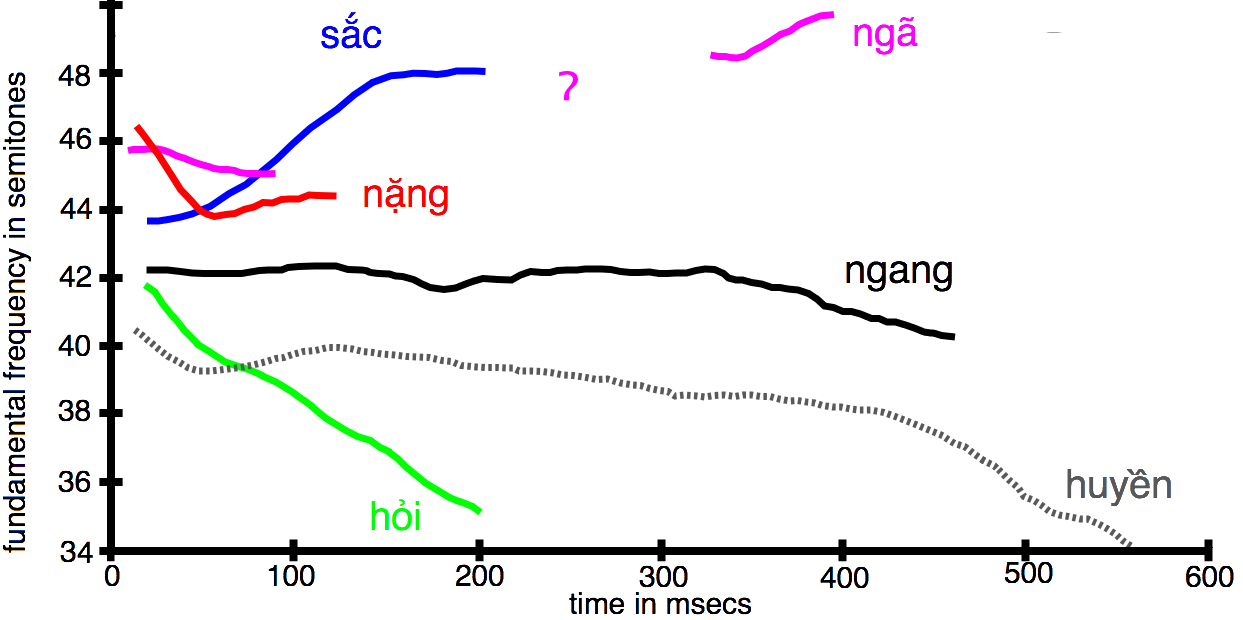
Hanoi tones as uttered by a different female speaker in isolation. From Nguyễn & Edmondson (1998)

===== Ngang tone =====
- The ngang tone is level at around the mid level (33) and is produced with modal voice phonation (i.e. with "normal" phonation). Alexandre de Rhodes (1651) describes this as "level"; Nguyễn (1997) describes it as "high (or mid) level".

===== Huyền tone =====
- The huyền tone starts low-mid and falls (21). Some Hanoi speakers start at a somewhat higher point (31). It is sometimes accompanied by breathy voice (or lax) phonation in some speakers, but this is lacking in other speakers: bà = [ɓa˨˩]. (Note: For example, Nguyễn & Edmondson (1998) show a male speaker from Nam Định with lax voice and a female speaker from Hanoi with breathy voice for the huyền tone while another male speaker from Hanoi has modal voice for the huyền.) Alexandre de Rhodes (1651) describes this as "grave-lowering"; Nguyễn (1997) describes it as "low falling".

===== Hỏi tone =====
- The hỏi tone starts a mid level and falls. It starts with modal voice phonation, which moves increasingly toward tense voice with accompanying harsh voice (although the harsh voice seems to vary according to speaker). Nguyễn & Edmondson (1998) reports that in Hanoi, the tone is mid falling (31). In other northern speakers, the tone is mid falling and then rises back to the mid level (313 or 323). This characteristic gives this tone its traditional description as "dipping". However, the falling-rising contour is most obvious in citation forms or when syllable-final; in other positions and when in fast speech, the rising contour is negligible. The hỏi also is relatively short compared with the other tones, but not as short as the nặng tone. Alexandre de Rhodes (1651) describes this as "smooth-rising"; Nguyễn (1997) describes it as "dipping-rising".

===== Ngã tone =====
- The ngã tone is mid rising (35). Many speakers begin the vowel with modal voice, followed by strong creaky voice starting toward the middle of the vowel, which is then lessening as the end of the syllable is approached. Some speakers with more dramatic glottalization have a glottal stop closure in the middle of the vowel (i.e. as [VʔV]). In Hanoi Vietnamese, the tone starts at a higher pitch (45) than other northern speakers. Alexandre de Rhodes (1651) describes this as "chesty-raised"; Nguyễn (1997) describes it as "creaking-rising".

===== Sắc tone =====
- The sắc tone starts as mid and then rises (35) in much the same way as the ngã tone. It is accompanied by tense voice phonation throughout the duration of the vowel. In some Hanoi speakers, the ngã tone is noticeably higher than the sắc tone, for example: má = ˧˦ (34); mã = ˦ˀ˥ (45). Alexandre de Rhodes (1651) describes this as "acute-angry"; Nguyễn (1997) describes it as "high (or mid) rising".

===== Nặng tone =====
- The nặng tone starts mid or low-mid and rapidly falls in pitch (32 or 21). It starts with tense voice that becomes increasingly tense until the vowel ends in a glottal stop closure. This tone is noticeably shorter than the other tones. Alexandre de Rhodes (1651) describes this as "chesty-heavy"; Nguyễn (1997) describes it as "constricted".

==== Southern varieties ====
Tone name	Tone ID	Vni/telex/Viqr	Description	Chao Tone Contour			Diacritic	Example
Tone name	Tone ID	Vni/telex/Viqr	Description	Quảng Nam	Bình Định	Ho Chi Minh City	Diacritic	Example
ngang "flat"	A1	[default]	mid flat level	˦˨ (42)	˧˧ (33)	˦˦ (44)	◌	ba ('three')
huyền "deep"	A2	2 / f / `	low falling	˧˩ (31)	˧˩ (31)	˧˩ (31)	◌̀	bà ('lady')
hỏi "asking"	C1	3 / r / ?	mid falling-rising	˧˨˦ (324)	˧˨˦ (324)	˨˩˦ (214)	◌̉	bả ('poison')
ngã "tumbling"	C2	4 / x / ~	mid falling-rising	˧˨˦ (324)	˧˨˦ (324)	˨˩˦ (214)	◌̃	bã ('residue')
sắc "sharp"	B1	1 / s / '	high rising	˦˥ (45)	˦˧˥ (435)	˧˥ (35)	◌́	bá ('governor')
nặng "heavy"	B2	5 / j / .	low falling-rising	˧˨˧ (323)	˧˩˧ (313)	˨˩˨ (212)	◌̣	bạ ('at random')

In Southern varieties, tones ngang, sắc, huyền have similar contours to Northern tones; however, these tones are produced with normal voice instead of breathy voice.

The nặng tone is pronounced as low rising tone (12) [˩˨] in fast speech or low falling-rising tone (212) [˨˩˨] in more careful utterance.

The ngã and hỏi tone are merged into a mid falling-rising (214) [˨˩˦], which is somewhat similar to the hỏi tone of the non-Hanoi Northern accent mentioned above. This merged hỏi–ngã tone is characteristic of Southern Vietnamese accents.

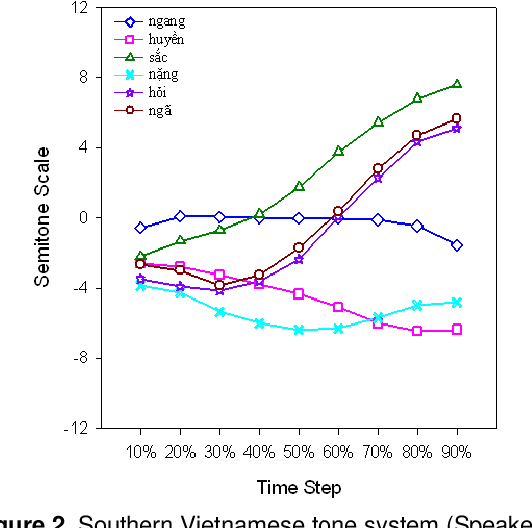
Southern Vietnamese tone system from female native speaker. From Jessica Bauman et al. (2009)

==== North-central and Central varieties ====
North-central and Central Vietnamese varieties are fairly similar with respect to tone although within the North-central dialect region there is considerable internal variation.

It is sometimes said (by people from other provinces) that people from Nghệ An pronounce every tone as a nặng tone.

=== Eight-tone analysis ===
An older analysis assumes eight tones rather than six. This follows the lead of traditional Chinese phonology. In Middle Chinese, syllables ending in a vowel or nasal allowed for three tonal distinctions, but syllables ending with /p/, /t/ or /k/ had no tonal distinctions. Rather, they were consistently pronounced with a short high tone, which was called the entering tone and considered a fourth tone. Similar considerations lead to the identification of two additional tones in Vietnamese for syllables ending in /p/, /t/, /c/ and /k/. These are not phonemically distinct from the sắc and nặng tones, however, and hence not considered as separate tones by modern linguists and are not distinguished in the orthography.

Traditional Tone Category		Register	Tone name	Tone ID	Vni/telex/Viqr	Description	Chao Tone Contour by Location				Diacritic	Example
Traditional Tone Category		Register	Tone name	Tone ID	Vni/telex/Viqr	Description	Hanoi	Quảng Nam	Bình Định	Ho Chi Minh City	Diacritic	Example
bằng 平 "even"	bình 平 "level"	phù "high"	ngang "flat"	A1	[default]	mid flat level	˧ (33)	˦˨ (42)	˧ (33)	˦ (44)	◌	ba ('three')
bằng 平 "even"	bình 平 "level"	trầm "low"	huyền "deep"	A2	2 / f / `	low falling	˨˩ (21)	˧˩ (31)	˧˩ (31)	˧˩ (31)	◌̀	bà ('lady')
trắc 仄 "oblique"	thượng 上 "rising"	high	hỏi "asking"	C1	3 / r / ?	mid falling-rising	˧˩˧ (313)	˧˨˦ (324)	˧˨˦ (324)	˨˩˦ (214)	◌̉	bả ('poison')
trắc 仄 "oblique"	thượng 上 "rising"	low	ngã "tumbling"	C2	4 / x / ~	mid rising, glottalized	˧ˀ˥ (3ˀ5~4ˀ5)	˧˨˦ (324)	˧˨˦ (324)	˨˩˦ (214)	◌̃	bã ('residue')
trắc 仄 "oblique"	khứ 去 "departing"	high	sắc "sharp"	B1	1 / s / '	high rising	˧˥ (35)	˦˥ (45)	˦˧˥ (435)	˧˥ (35)	◌́	bá ('governor')
trắc 仄 "oblique"	khứ 去 "departing"	low	nặng "heavy"	B2	5 / j / .	low falling-rising	˧ˀ˩ʔ (3ˀ1ʔ)	˧˨˧ (323)	˦˧˦ (313)	˨˩˨ (212)	◌̣	bạ ('at random')
trắc 仄 "oblique"	nhập 入 "entering"	high	sắc "sharp"	D1	1 / s / '	high checked rising	˧˥ (35)			˦˥ (45)	◌́	bác ('uncle')
trắc 仄 "oblique"	nhập 入 "entering"	low	nặng "heavy"	D2	5 / j / .	low checked falling	˧ˀ˩ʔ (3ˀ1ʔ)			˨˩ (21)	◌̣	bạc ('silver')

== Syllables and phonotactics ==
According to Hannas (1997), there are 4,500 to 4,800 possible spoken syllables (depending on dialect), and the standard national orthography (Quốc Ngữ) can represent 6,200 syllables (Quốc Ngữ orthography represents more phonemic distinctions than are made by any one dialect). A description of syllable structure and exploration of its patterning according to the Prosodic Analysis approach of J.R. Firth is given in Henderson (1966).

The Vietnamese syllable structure follows the scheme:

(C_{1})(w)V(G|C_{2})+T

where

- C_{1} = initial consonant onset
- w = labiovelar on-glide /w/
- V = vowel nucleus
- G = off-glide coda (/j/ or /w/)
- C_{2} = final consonant coda
- T = tone.

In other words, a syllable has an obligatory nucleus and tone, and can have an optional consonant onset, an optional on-glide /w/, and an optional coda or off-glide.

More explicitly, the syllable types are as follows:

Syllable	Example	Syllable	Example
V	ê "eh"	wV	uể "sluggish"
VC	ám "possess (by ghosts, in the hands of a person etc.)"	wVC	oán "bear a grudge"
VC	ớt "capsicum"	wVC	oắt "little imp"
CV	nữ "female"	CwV	huỷ "cancel"
CVC	cơm "rice"	CwVC	toán "math"
CVC	tức "angry"	CwVC	hoặc "or"

C_{1}: Any consonant may occur in as an onset with the following exception:

- /p/ does not occur in native Vietnamese words

w: the onglide /w/ (sometimes transcribed instead as labialization [ʷ] on a preceding consonant):

- does not occur after /n/ in native Vietnamese words (it occurs in uncommon Sino-Vietnamese borrowings, such as noãn "ovule")

V: The vowel nucleus V may be any of the following 14 monophthongs or diphthongs: /i, ɯ, u, e, ɤ, o, ɛ, ʌ, ɔ, ɐ, a, iə̯, ɯə̯, uə̯/.

G: The offglide may be /j/ or /w/. Together, V and G must form one of the diphthongs or triphthongs listed in the section on Vowels.

- offglide /j/ does not follow the front vowels /i, e, ɛ, iə̯/
- offglide /w/ does not follow the rounded vowels /u, o, ɔ, uə̯/
- with some exceptions (such as khuỷu tay "elbow"), the offglide /w/ cannot occur if the syllable contains a /w/ onglide

C_{2}: The optional coda C_{2} is restricted to labial, coronal, and velar stops and nasals /p, t, k, m, n, ŋ/, which cannot cooccur with the offglides /j, w/.

T: Syllables are spoken with an inherent tone contour:

- Six tone contours are possible for syllables with offglides /j, w/, closed syllables with nasal codas /m, n, ŋ/, and open syllables—i.e., those without consonant codas /p, t, k/.
- If the syllable is closed with one of the oral stops /p, t, k/, only two contours are possible: the sắc and the nặng tones.

Common Vietnamese rimes ^{[Notes]}
		Zero coda	Off-glide coda		Nasal consonant coda			Stop consonant coda		
		∅	/j/	/w/	/m/	/n/	/ŋ/	/p/	/t/	/k/
Vowel nucleus	/ɐ/		ay [ɐj]	au [ɐw]	ăm [ɐm]	ặn [ɐn]	ặng [ɐŋ]	ặp [ɐp]	ặt [ɐt]	ặc [ɐk]
Vowel nucleus	/a/	ạ, (gi)à, (gi)ả, (gi)ã, (gi)á [a]	ại [aj]	ạo [aw]	ạm [am]	ạn [an]	ạng [aŋ]	ạp [ap]	ạt [at]	ạc [ak]
Vowel nucleus	/ɛ/	ẹ [ɛ]		ẹo [ɛw]	ẹm [ɛm]	ẹn [ɛn]	ạnh [ăjŋ]	ẹp [ɛp]	ẹt [ɛt]	ạch [ăjk]
Vowel nucleus	/ɔ/	ọ [ɔ]	ọi [ɔj]		ọm [ɔm]	ọn [ɔn]	ọng [ăwŋ]	ọp [ɔp]	ọt [ɔt]	ọc [ăwk]
Vowel nucleus	/ʌ/		ậy [ʌj]	ậu [ʌw]	ậm [ʌm]	ận [ʌn]	ậng [ʌŋ]	ập [ʌp]	ật [ʌt]	ậc [ʌk]
Vowel nucleus	/ɤ/	ợ [ɤ]	ợi [ɤj]		ợm [ɤm]	ợn [ɤn]		ợp [ɤp]	ợt [ɤt]	
Vowel nucleus	/e/	ệ [e]		ệu [ew]	ệm [em]	ện [en]	ệnh [ə̆jŋ]	ệp [ep]	ệt [et]	ệch [ə̆jk]
Vowel nucleus	/o/	ộ [o]	ội [oj]		ộm [om]	ộn [on]	ộng [ə̆wŋ]	ộp [op]	ột [ot]	ộc [ə̆wk]
Vowel nucleus	/i/	ị, ỵ [i]		ịu [iw]	ịm, ỵm [im]	ịn [in]	ịnh [iŋ]	ịp, ỵp [ip]	ịt [it]	ịch, ỵch [ik]
Vowel nucleus	/ɯ/	ự [ɯ]	ựi [ɯj]	ựu [ɯw]			ựng [ɯŋ]		ựt [ɯt]	ực [ɯk]
Vowel nucleus	/u/	ụ [u]	ụi [uj]		ụm [um]	ụn [un]	ụng [uŋ]	ụp [up]	ụt [ut]	ục [uk]
Vowel nucleus	/iə/	ịa, (g)ịa, ỵa [iə]		iệu, yệu [iəw]	iệm, yệm [iəm]	iện, yện [iən]	iệng, yệng [iəŋ]	iệp, yệp [iəp]	iệt, yệt [iət]	iệc [iək]
Vowel nucleus	/ɯə/	ựa [ɯə]	ượi [ɯəj]	ượu [ɯəw]	ượm [ɯəm]	ượn [ɯən]	ượng [ɯəŋ]	ượp [ɯəp]	ượt [ɯət]	ược [ɯək]
Vowel nucleus	/uə/	ụa [uə]	uội [uəj]		uộm [uəm]	uộn [uən]	uộng [uəŋ]		uột [uət]	uộc [uək]
Labiovelar on-glide followed by vowel nucleus	/ʷɐ/		oạy, (q)uạy [ʷɐj]		oặm, (q)uặm [ʷɐm]	oặn, (q)uặn [ʷɐn]	oặng, (q)uặng [ʷɐŋ]	oặp, (q)uặp [ʷɐp]	oặt, (q)uặt [ʷɐt]	oặc, (q)uặc [ʷɐk]
Labiovelar on-glide followed by vowel nucleus	/ʷa/	oạ, (q)uạ [ʷa]	oại, (q)uại [ʷaj]	oạo, (q)uạo [ʷaw]	oạm, (q)uạm [ʷam]	oạn, (q)uạn [ʷan]	oạng, (q)uạng [ʷaŋ]	oạp, (q)uạp [ʷap]	oạt, (q)uạt [ʷat]	oạc, (q)uạc [ʷak]
Labiovelar on-glide followed by vowel nucleus	/ʷɛ/	oẹ, (q)uẹ [ʷɛ]		oẹo, (q)uẹo [ʷɛw]	oẹm, (q)uẹm [ʷɛm]	oẹn, (q)uẹn [ʷɛn]	oạnh, (q)uạnh [ʷăjŋ]		oẹt, (q)uẹt [ʷɛt]	oạch, (q)uạch [ʷăjk]
Labiovelar on-glide followed by vowel nucleus	/ʷʌ/		uậy [ʷʌj]			uận [ʷʌn]	uậng [ʷʌŋ]		uật [ʷʌt]	
Labiovelar on-glide followed by vowel nucleus	/ʷɤ/	uợ [ʷɤ]								
Labiovelar on-glide followed by vowel nucleus	/ʷe/	uệ [ʷe]		uệu [ʷew]		uện [ʷen]	uệnh [ʷə̆jŋ]		uệt [ʷet]	uệch [ʷə̆jk]
Labiovelar on-glide followed by vowel nucleus	/ʷi/	uỵ [ʷi]		uỵu [ʷiw]		uỵn [ʷin]	uỵnh [ʷiŋ]	uỵp [ʷip]	uỵt [ʷit]	uỵch [ʷik]
Labiovelar on-glide followed by vowel nucleus	/ʷiə/	uỵa [ʷiə]				uyện [ʷiən]			uyệt [ʷiət]	
Tone		a /a/, à /â/, á /ǎ/, ả /a᷉/, ã /ǎˀ/, ạ /âˀ/						á /á/, ạ /à/		

^ Notes:

- Less common rimes may not be represented in this table.
- The nặng tone mark (dot below) has been added to all rimes in this table for illustration purposes only. It indicates which letter tone marks in general are added to, largely according to the "new style" rules of Vietnamese orthography as stated in Quy tắc đặt dấu thanh trong chữ quốc ngữ. In practice, not all these rimes have real words or syllables that have the nặng tone.
- The IPA representations are based on Wikipedia's conventions. Different dialects may have different pronunciations.

== Notes ==
Below is a table comparing four linguists' different transcriptions of Vietnamese vowels as well as the orthographic representation. Notice that this article mostly follows Han (1966), with the exception of marking short vowels short.

comparison of orthography & vowel descriptions
Orthography	Wikipedia	Thompson	Han	Nguyễn	Đoàn
i/y	i	iː	i	i	i
ê	e	eː	e	e	e
e	ɛ	ɛː	ɛ	a	ɛ
ư	ɨ	ɯː	ɨ	ɯ	ɯ
u	u	uː	u	u	u
ô	o	oː	o	o	o
o	ɔ	ɔː	ɔ	ɔ	ɔ
ơ	ə	ɤː	ɜː	əː	ɤː
â	ə̆	ʌ	ɜ	ə	ɤ
a	a	æː	ɐː	ɐː	aː
ă	ă	ɐ	ɐ	ɐ	a

Thompson (1965) says that the vowels [ʌ] (orthographic â) and [ɐ] (orthographic ă) are shorter than all of the other vowels, which is shown here with the length mark [ː] added to the other vowels. His vowels above are only the basic vowel phonemes. Thompson gives a very detailed description of each vowel's various allophonic realizations.

Han (1966) uses acoustic analysis, including spectrograms and formant measuring and plotting, to describe the vowels. She states that the primary difference between orthographic ơ & â and a & ă is a difference of length (a ratio of 2:1). ơ = /ɜː/, â = /ɜ/; a = /ɐː/, ă = /ɐ/. Her formant plots also seem to show that /ɜː/ may be slightly higher than /ɜ/ in some contexts (but this would be secondary to the main difference of length).

Another thing to mention about Han's studies is that she uses a rather small number of participants and, additionally, although her participants are native speakers of the Hanoi variety, they all have lived outside of Hanoi for a significant period of their lives (e.g. in France or Ho Chi Minh City).

Nguyễn (1997) has a simpler, more symmetrical description. He says that his work is not a "complete grammar" but rather a "descriptive introduction." So, his chart above is more a phonological vowel chart rather than a phonetic one.

== Bibliography ==
- Alves, Mark J. (1995). "Tonal features and the development of Vietnamese tones". Working Papers in Linguistics. 27: 1–13.
- Alves, Mark J. (2007). "A Look At North-Central Vietnamese" (PDF). In Wayland, Ratree; Hartmann, John; Sidwell, Paul (eds.). SEALS XII: Papers from the 12th Annual Meeting of the Southeast Asian Linguistics Society 2002. Canberra: Pacific Linguistics. pp. 1–7.
- Brunelle, Marc (2003). "Coarticulation effects in northern Vietnamese tones" ( (PDF)). Proceedings of the 15th International Conference of Phonetic Sciences. Archived from the original on 2011-07-09.
- Brunelle, Marc (2009). "Tone perception in Northern and Southern Vietnamese". Journal of Phonetics. 37 (1): 79–96. doi:10.1016/j.wocn.2008.09.003.
- Đoàn, Thiện Thuật (1980), Ngữ âm tiếng Việt, Hà Nội: Đại học và Trung học Chuyên nghiệp, OCLC 52436584
- Đoàn, Thiện Thuật; Nguyễn, Khánh Hà; Phạm, Như Quỳnh (2003) [2001]. A Concise Vietnamese Grammar (For Non-Native Speakers) (Revised 2nd ed.). Hà Nội: Thế Giới Publishers. OCLC 54703297.
- Earle, M. A. (1975). An acoustic study of northern Vietnamese tones. SCRL monograph. Vol. 11. Santa Barbara, CA: Speech Communications Research Laboratory. OCLC 3182752.
- Emerich, Giang Huong (2012). The Vietnamese Vowel System (PhD thesis). University of Pennsylvania. Archived from the original on December 22, 2015.
- Ferlus, Michel (1997). "Problemes de la formation du systeme vocalique du vietnamien". Asie Orientale. 26 (1).
- Gregerson, Kenneth J. (1969). "A study of Middle Vietnamese phonology". Bulletin de la Société des Études Indochinoises. 44 (135–193).
  - Gregerson, Kenneth J. A study of Middle Vietnamese phonology (MA thesis). University of Washington.
  - Gregerson, Kenneth J. (1981). A study of Middle Vietnamese phonology. Dallas: Summer Institute of Linguistics.
- Han, Mieko (1966). Vietnamese vowels. Studies in the phonology of Asian languages. Vol. 4. Los Angeles: University of Southern California.
- Han, Mieko S. (1968). Complex syllable nuclei in Vietnamese. Studies in the phonology of Asian languages. Vol. 6. Los Angeles: University of Southern California.
- Han, Mieko S. (1969). Vietnamese tones. Studies in the phonology of Asian languages. Vol. 8. Los Angeles: University of Southern California.
- Han, Mieko S.; Kim, Kong-On (1972). Intertonal influences in two-syllable utterances of Vietnamese. Studies in the phonology of Asian languages. Vol. 10. Los Angeles: University of Southern California.
- Han, Mieko S.; Kim, Kong-On (1974). "Phonetic variation of Vietnamese tones in disyllabic utterances". Journal of Phonetics. 2 (3): 223–232. doi:10.1016/S0095-4470(19)31272-0.
- Hannas, William (1997). Asia's Orthographic Dilemma. University of Hawaii Press. ISBN 978-0-8248-1892-0.
- Haudricourt, André-Georges (1949). "Origine des particularités de l'alphabet vietnamien". Dân Việt-Nam. 3: 61–68.
- Haudricourt, André-Georges (1954). "De l'origine des tons en vietnamien". Journal Asiatique. 142 (1).
- Haupers, Ralph (1969). "A note on Vietnamese kh and ph". Mon-Khmer Studies. 3: 76.
- Henderson, Eugénie J. A. (1966). "Towards a prosodic statement of the Vietnamese syllable structure". In Bazell, C. J.; Catford, J. C.; Halliday, M. A. K.; Robins, R. H. (eds.). In Memory of J. R. Firth. London: Longmans. pp. 163–197. OCLC 1671521.
- Hoàng, Thị Châu (1989). Tiếng Việt trên các miền đất nước: Phương ngữ học. Hà Nội: Khoa học xã hội. OCLC 27465711.
- Hoang, Thi Quynh Hoa (1965). A phonological contrastive study of Vietnamese and English (PDF) (MA thesis). Lubbock, TX: Texas Technological College. hdl:2346/12672.
- Kang, Yoonjung; Phạm, Andrea Hòa; Storme, Benjamin (2014). "French loanwords in Vietnamese: the role of input language phonotactics and contrast in loanword adaptation" (PDF). Annual Meeting on Phonology 2014. Massachusetts Institute of Technology.
- Kirby, James P. (2011). "Vietnamese (Hanoi Vietnamese)" (PDF). Journal of the International Phonetic Association. 41 (3): 381–392. doi:10.1017/S0025100311000181.
- Michaud, Alexis (2004). "Final consonants and glottalization: New perspectives from Hanoi Vietnamese" (PDF). Phonetica. 61 (2–3): 119–146. doi:10.1159/000082560. PMID 15662108. S2CID 462578. HAL hal-00130119.
- Michaud, Alexis; Vu-Ngoc, Tuan; Amelot, Angélique; Roubeau, Bernard (2006). "Nasal release, nasal finals and tonal contrasts in Hanoi Vietnamese: an aerodynamic experiment". Mon-Khmer Studies. 36: 121–137.
- Nguyễn, Đăng-Liêm (1970). Vietnamese pronunciation. PALI language texts: Southeast Asia. Honolulu: University of Hawaii Press. ISBN 978-0-87022-462-1.
- Nguyễn, Đình-Hoà (1955). Quốc-ngữ: The modern writing system in Vietnam. Washington, DC.
- Nguyễn, Đình-Hoà (1959). Hòa's Vietnamese-English dictionary. Saigon.
  - Nguyễn, Đình-Hoà (1966). Vietnamese-English dictionary. Rutland, VT: C.E. Tuttle. (Revised version of Nguyễn 1959)
  - Nguyễn, Đình-Hoà (1995). NTC's Vietnamese-English dictionary (revised ed.). Lincolnwood, IL: NTC. (Revised & expanded version of Nguyễn 1966)
- Nguyễn, Đình-Hoà (1992). "Vietnamese phonology and graphemic borrowings from Chinese: The Book of 3,000 Characters revisited". Mon-Khmer Studies. 20: 163–182.
- Nguyễn, Đình-Hoà (1996). "Vietnamese". In Daniels, P. T.; Bright, W. (eds.). The world's writing systems. New York: Oxford University Press. pp. 691–699. ISBN 0-19-507993-0.
- Nguyễn, Đình-Hoà (1997). Vietnamese: Tiếng Việt không son phấn. Amsterdam: John Benjamins. ISBN 978-1-55619-733-8.
- Nguyễn, Văn Lợi; Edmondson, Jerold A. (1998). "Tones and voice quality in modern northern Vietnamese: Instrumental case studies". Mon-Khmer Studies. 28: 1–18.
- Phạm, Hoà (2001). "A phonetic study of Vietnamese tones: Reconsideration of the register flip-flop rule in reduplication". In Féry, C.; Green, A. D.; van de Vijver, R. (eds.). Proceedings of HILP5. Linguistics in Potsdam. Vol. 12. Potsdam: Universität Potsdam. pp. 140–158. ISBN 3-935024-27-4.
- Phạm, Hoà Andrea (2003). Vietnamese Tone – A New Analysis. New York: Routledge. ISBN 978-0-415-96762-4.
- Phạm, Hoà Andrea (2006). "Vietnamese Rhyme". Southwest Journal of Linguistics. 25: 107–142.
- Phạm, Hoà Andrea (2008). "The Non-Issue of Dialect in Teaching Vietnamese". Journal of Southeast Asian Language Teaching. 14: 22–39.
- Thompson, Laurence (1959). "Saigon phonemics". Language. 35 (3): 454–476. doi:10.2307/411232. JSTOR 411232.
- Thompson, Laurence (1965). A Vietnamese reference grammar (1st ed.). Seattle: University of Washington Press. ISBN 978-0-8248-1117-4.
- Thompson, Laurence (1967). "The history of Vietnamese final palatals". Language. 43 (1): 362–371. doi:10.2307/411402. JSTOR 411402.
- Thurgood, Graham (2002). "Vietnamese and tonogenesis: Revising the model and the analysis". Diachronica. 19 (2): 333–363. doi:10.1075/dia.19.2.04thu.
