= Phaya Khottabong =

Legendary king in Southeast Asia folklore

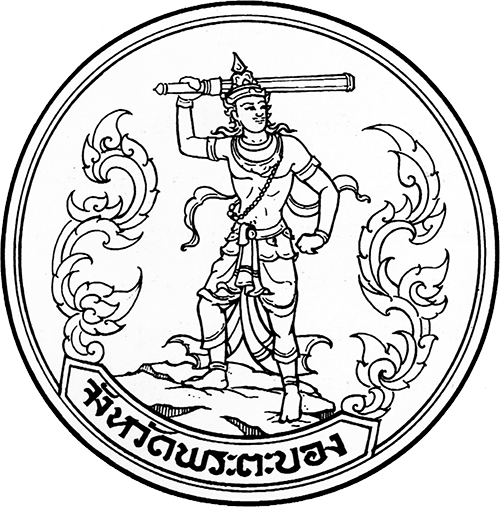
Seal of Phra Tabong Province during Thai administration (1941–1946), showing Phaya Khottabong raising his club.

Phaya Khottabong (พญาโคตรตะบอง), known among the Lao as Thao Si Khottabong, Phaya Si Khottabong, or simply Si Khottabong, and among the Khmer as Phaya Tabong Khayung, is a legendary king whose story survives in the folklore of Thailand, Laos, and Cambodia alike. Versions of the tale turn up all along the Mekong River basin, from Laos and the right-bank provinces of northeastern Thailand between Nong Khai Province and Ubon Ratchathani Province, to the Nan River basin around Phichit Province and Lopburi Province, and as far as Battambang in present-day Cambodia.

One of the oldest written versions appears in the Northern Chronicles (พงศาวดารเหนือ), compiled under Rama II by Phra Wichian Preecha (Noi) from older Ayutthaya-era sources. The same story is kept alive in the oral traditions of Phichit. Where the Northern Chronicles present Phaya Khottabong as a Buddhist ruler of the pre-Ayutthayan polities of the Chao Phraya basin, the Phichit tradition folds him into Phaya Khottabong Devaraja, the legendary founder of Mueang Phichit and Nakhon Chaiwan, whose city-founding rites are recorded as drawing on Brahmanical ceremonies dedicated to Shiva and Vishnu. Phichit locals call him Pho Pu (พ่อปู่, "Grandfather") and credit him with founding the city; a statue of him still stands beneath the city pillar shrine there. Across the border in Laos, a monument to Phaya Si Khottabong stands in Thakhek, Khammouane Province, facing That Sikhottabong, one of the country's most important Buddhist stupas.

Some scholars have gone further and connected the legend to the bas-reliefs of Lavo troops at Angkor Wat, reading the club-wielding figure there as Phaya Khottabong himself. In Cambodia, meanwhile, the accepted explanation for the name Battambang (Khmer: បាត់ដំបង; lit. 'Lost Club') is drawn directly from the Phaya Khottabong story.

== Legend ==
=== Northern Chronicle version ===
Phaya Khottabong พญาโคตรตะบอง

King of Ayodhya
- Reign: 974–980s
- Predecessor: Bhuddhasagara
- Successor: Sindhob Amarin (under Phraek Si Racha)
- Born: 954; Ayutthaya
- Died: 1015; Ayutthaya
- Father: Bhuddhasagara

In the Northern Chronicle, Phaya Khottabong is the son of Phaya Khodom, a descendant of Phra Maha Phutthasakhon, who had ruled a kingdom centred on Nong Sano Island — the site now occupied by Wat Ayothaya. Phaya Khottabong himself was famous for his sheer strength, fought with a club as his signature weapon, and was believed impossible to kill by any ordinary means.

The trouble began when the royal astrologer predicted that a person of great merit would be born in the kingdom. Phaya Khottabong responded by ordering every pregnant woman put to death. When the astrologer later reported that the child had already been born, he had every newborn infant burned instead. One baby survived: a monk found him and raised him at Wat Pho Phi Hai. Seventeen years later the boy had grown up, but the burns had left him crippled — he dragged his feet as he walked, and people took to calling him Nai Kraek after the scraping sound he made.

The god Indra then appeared to him disguised as an old man leading a horse. Before going on his way, he told Nai Kraek to wait with the horse and, if he got hungry, to eat the rice tied up in a bundle nearby. After a long wait Nai Kraek did eat the rice, and it gave him extraordinary strength on the spot. The bundle also held a small bottle of oil; when he rubbed it over his body, his injuries healed completely. Dressed in the royal regalia Indra had left for him, he mounted the horse, and it flew him straight to the royal palace.

At the sight of him, Phaya Khottabong panicked and hurled his club — but missed, and the club landed far off in Lan Xang. Nai Kraek took the throne instead, marrying into the royal family and taking the name Sindhob Amarin. Phaya Khottabong set off after his lost weapon, chasing it all the way to Lan Xang. There, the ruler of Lan Xang, wary of his strength, offered him a daughter in marriage while quietly plotting to be rid of him. Through her, he learned Phaya Khottabong's one weakness: he could only be killed by a spear driven up through his anus. A hidden spear was rigged beneath a privy, and it fatally wounded him the moment he sat down.

Ashamed at having been undone by a woman's trickery, Phaya Khottabong made his way back to his own city and died there of his wounds. King Sindhob Amarin later had him cremated at a site that became known as Wat Sop Sawan, identified today with Wat Suan Luang Sop Sawan.

=== Lan Xang version ===
The Lao tradition tells a different origin story. Phaya Si Khottabong began life as a commoner who had a hard childhood and was later ordained as a novice monk. As the story goes, he was a lazy novice: cooking rice for temple labourers one day, he stirred the pot with a stick cut from a black cotton tree, which turned the whole batch black. Afraid of being scolded, he ate the ruined rice himself — and unexpectedly came away with tremendous strength.

His new power soon showed itself: he single-handedly hauled heavy logs for temple construction, astonishing the abbot and everyone watching. Later, when a herd of elephants went on a rampage through Vientiane, the ruler Phaya Anuphawan promised his daughter's hand and rule over the city to anyone who could bring them under control. Si Khottabong left the monkhood, subdued the elephants, and married Nang Khiao Khom as promised.

As his standing grew, Phaya Anuphawan began to fear him and looked for a way to have him killed. Through Nang Khiao Khom, he learned that Si Khottabong's only vulnerable point was, again, a spear through the anus. A trap was set beneath a privy, and Si Khottabong died from the wound. Before he died, he is said to have cursed Vientiane, condemning it never to prosper, before flying back to Pengchan to die there.

=== Battambang version ===
In the Battambang telling, Phaya Tabong Khayung was originally conscripted to cut wood for a royal funeral pyre, but ended up assigned to cooking duty instead. While preparing rice, he stirred it with a piece of black wood, which turned it dark; afraid the others would mock him, he ate the whole ruined pot himself and cooked a fresh batch. As in the Lao version, the tainted rice left him unexpectedly, superhumanly strong.

His strength became obvious to everyone when he hung the heavy cooking pot from a tree branch and pulled the branch down for the others to eat from — a feat that convinced the workers he must have supernatural powers. Rallying behind him, they overthrew the local ruler and made him king of Battambang in his place.

== Interpretations ==
Some modern scholars read the Phaya Khottabong legend as a record of the religious upheaval that swept mainland Southeast Asia in the late first millennium CE. Sujit Wongthes, for instance, treating him as a stand-in for the older Brahmanical–Mahayana political and religious order. In this reading, Sindhob Amarin's rise — he succeeds Phaya Khottabong in the Northern Chronicles — represents the eventual victory of Theravada Buddhism, newly arrived from Sri Lanka, over that older establishment.

Wongthes takes this further, arguing that the conflict between Phaya Khottabong and Sindhob Amarin isn't really about two individuals at all — it's a literary stand-in for a much larger religious and political shift across the Chao Phraya basin, preserving the memory of Theravada Buddhism gradually displacing the older Brahmanical-Mahayana traditions.

== Legacy ==
The legend has left a lasting mark on local identity across Thailand, Laos, and Cambodia. In Phichit, Phaya Khottabong is still honoured as Pho Pu (พ่อปู่, lit. 'Grandfather') and credited as the city's founder; his statue stands beneath the city pillar shrine, where annual ceremonies are still held in his name. The city's shrine is unusual in placing the pillar itself above a statue of Phaya Khottabong Devaraja seated in the act of supporting it, and the province's governor presides in person each year at the ceremony held for him before Songkran.

In Laos, Phaya Si Khottabong is remembered with a monument in Thakhek, Khammouane Province, opposite That Sikhottabong, one of the country's most important Buddhist stupas, where an annual rite honouring him is held alongside the stupa's own festival.

And in Cambodia, the name Battambang (Khmer: បាត់ដំបង; lit. 'Lost Club') is still explained by the same story — the place, tradition holds, where Phaya Khottabong's club came down. A statue of him stands at a roundabout in the centre of Battambang, facing east along the road to Phnom Penh, which local belief holds lets him watch over the city against invaders.

Between 1941 and 1946, during the period of Thai administration, the seal of Phra Tabong Province even depicted Phaya Khottabong mid-swing with his club — a small sign of how deeply the legend had rooted itself in the region's sense of its own history.
