= Khoun Kong Leng Lake =

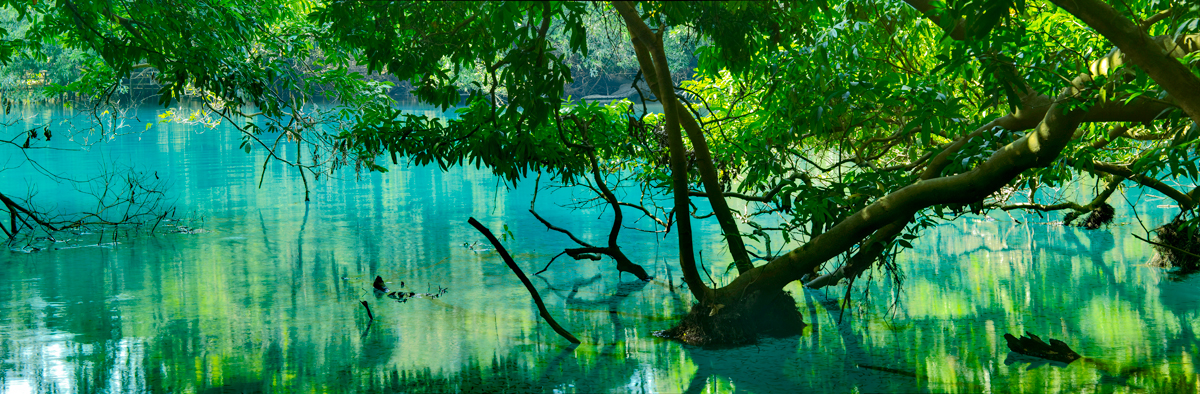

- Location in Laos
- Location: Khammouane Province, Laos
- Coordinates: 17°38′29″N 104°48′45″E
- Type: Natural lake
- Primary inflows: Subterranean river
- Basin countries: Laos
- Average depth: 21 m (69 ft)

Khoun Kong Leng Lake, also Kong Leng Lake, is a lake of Khammouane Province, Laos, located roughly 30 miles north of Thakhek in the Phu Hin Pun foothills. The lake is roughly 21 metres (70 ft) deep in the centre and is a bright emerald colour. Lonely Planet describes it as "stunningly beautiful", "luminescent green waters [which] spring from a subterranean river." The underground water flows through limestone, which gives the water its green colour. The lake is revered by the locals who believe it has mystical powers and the ability to ring a gong in the dead of night on full moon. The name of the lake "Kong Leng" means "evening gong", reflecting local belief.
