= Hinnamnor =

Hinnamnor may refer to:

- Hin Namno National Park, also known as Hinnamnor National Protected Area, in Boualapha District, Khammouane Province, Laos
- Typhoon Hinnamnor, a super typhoon in the Northwestern Pacific Ocean in 2022
