= Calame's bent-toed gecko =

Scientific classification
- Kingdom: Animalia
- Phylum: Chordata
- Class: Reptilia
- Order: Squamata
- Suborder: Gekkota
- Family: Gekkonidae
- Genus: Cyrtodactylus
- Species: C. calamei

Binomial name
- Cyrtodactylus calamei Luu, Bonkowski, Nguyen, Le, Schneider, Ngo & Ziegler, 2016

Species of lizard

Calame's bent-toed gecko (Cyrtodactylus calamei) is a species of lizard in the family Gekkonidae. The species is endemic to Laos.

== Etymology ==
The specific name, calamei, is in honor of naturalist and environmentalist Thomas Calame.

== Geographic range ==
C. calamei is found in central Laos, in Khammouane Province.

== Habitat ==
The preferred natural habitat of C. calamei is karst forest, at altitudes of 190–260 m (620–850 ft).

== Description ==
Adults of C. calamei have a snout-to-vent length (SVL) of about 8 cm (3.1 in). Females are larger than males. The largest recorded female is about 9 cm (3.5 in) SVL, while the largest recorded male is about 7.5 cm (3.0 in) SVL.

== Behavior ==
C. calamei is nocturnal.

== Reproduction ==
The mode of reproduction of C. calamei is unknown.
