= Soudthichak's bent-toed gecko =

Conservation status
- Least Concern (IUCN 3.1)

Scientific classification
- Kingdom: Animalia
- Phylum: Chordata
- Class: Reptilia
- Order: Squamata
- Suborder: Gekkota
- Family: Gekkonidae
- Genus: Cyrtodactylus
- Species: C. soudthichaki

Binomial name
- Cyrtodactylus soudthichaki Luu, Calame, T.Q. Nguyen, Bonkowski & Ziegler, 2015

Species of lizard

Soudthichak's bent-toed gecko (Cyrtodactylus soudthichaki) is a species of lizard in the family Gekkonidae. The species is endemic to Laos.

== Etymology ==
The specific name, soudthichaki, is in honor of Laotian conservationist Sisomphone Soudthichak.

== Geographic range ==
C. soudthichaki is found in central Laos, in Khammouane Province.

== Habitat ==
The preferred natural habitat of C. soudthichaki is forest, at altitudes of 150–170 m (490–560 ft).

== Description ==
Relatively small for its genus, C. soudthichaki may attain a snout-to-vent length (SVL) of 7 cm (2.8 in).

== Reproduction ==
The mode of reproduction of C. soudthichaki is unknown.
