= Ponpailin Kaewduangdee =

Lao chef and cookbook author

- ພອນໄພລິນ ແກ້ວດວງດີ
- Born: 15 October 1980; Ban Pon Paeng, Khammouane Province, Laos
- Died: 13 May 2025 (aged 44)
- Spouse: Mick Shippen

Ponpailin 'Noi' Kaewduangdee (Lao: ພອນໄພລິນ 'ນ້ອຍ' ແກ້ວດວງດີ; 1980—2025) was a Lao chef and cookbook author based in Vientiane, Laos. Noi was the chef and owner of Doi Ka Noi, a restaurant focused on regional and seasonal Lao cuisine.

== Early life and education ==
Ponpailin was raised in Ban Pon Paeng, a subsistence farming community in Khammouane Province.

== Career ==
She opened Doi Ka Noi in Vientiane in October 2015.

Noi was the first Lao member of Slow Food. She was a member of the Lao Food Foundation, and of Pha Khao Lao, an organization focused on preserving agricultural biodiversity in Laos.

In 2025, Doi Ka Noi was the first Lao restaurant to ever make the prestigious Asia's 50 Best Restaurant Awards, coming at no. 86 on the extended 51-100 list.

== A Child Of The Rice Fields: Recipes From Noi’s Lao Kitchen ==
In 2024, Noi and her husband, British travel photographer Mick Shippen, published A Child Of The Rice Fields: Recipes From Noi’s Lao Kitchen. The 480-page book is the most comprehensive ever written on Lao food. It includes an introduction about Noi's early life growing up in a subsistence farming community, an overview of Lao culture, cooking techniques, and ingredients, along with 400 images and more than 120 recipes. Nigella Lawson said of the book, “It’s a big, beautiful, lovingly created book: a feast for the curious cook and a comprehensive and intimately authoritative primer on a fascinating culinary culture.” Renowned British food writer and restaurant critic, Tom Parker Bowles said, "This is really the most remarkable book on Laotian cooking, the definitive bible and an instant classic." In June 2025, the cookbook was honored at the 30th Gourmand World Cookbook Awards, winning first prize for Best Asian Cookbook, second prize for Best Cookbook in the World, and fourth prize for Food Heroes for research and documenting. In November 2025 in Riyadh, Saudi Arabia, the book was awarded a Best of the Best award at the 30 Years of Gourmand World Cookbook Awards.
