= Thakhek District =

District of Khammouane province

Thakhek District ເມືອງທ່າແຂກ
- District
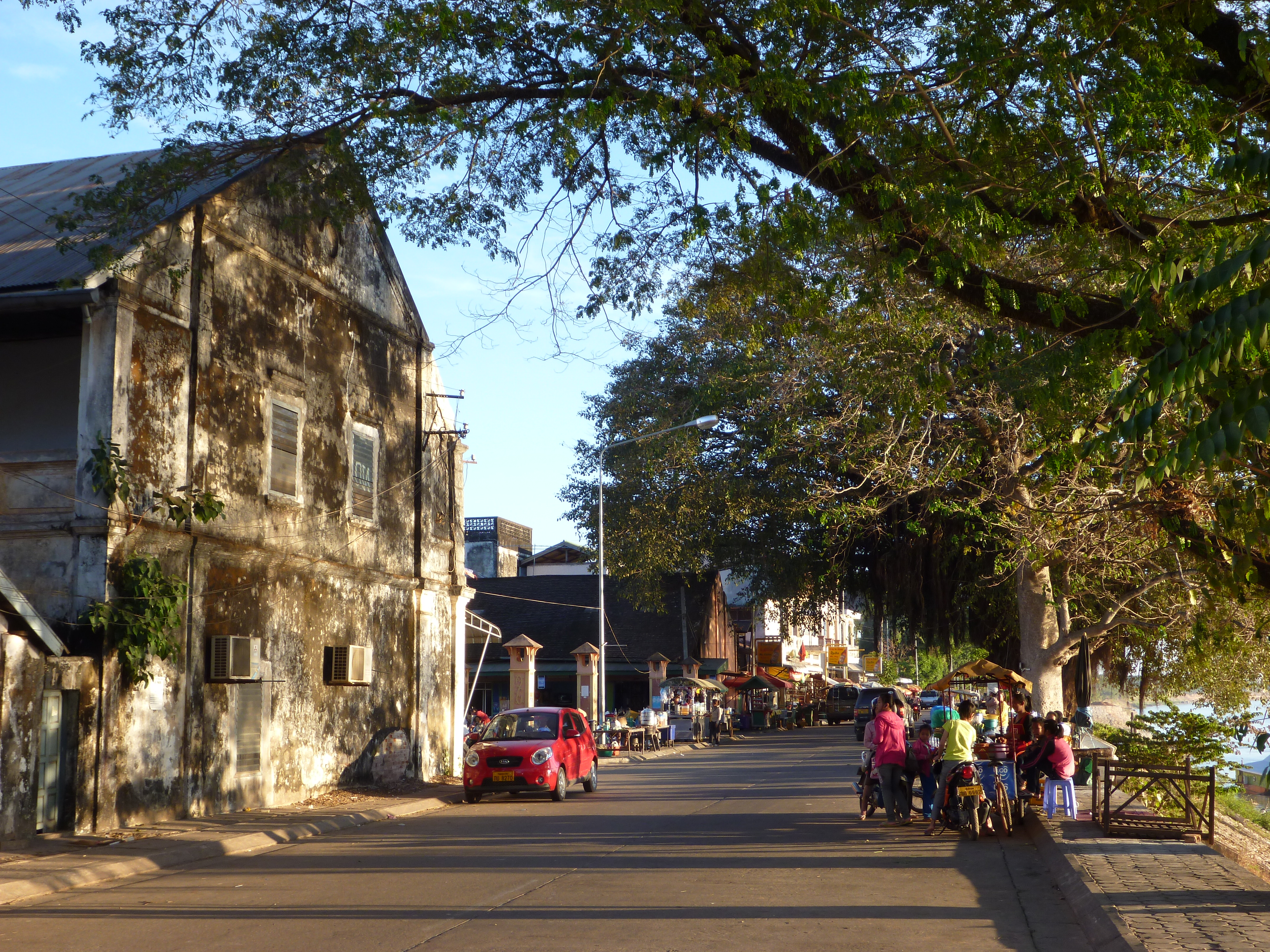
- Interactive map of Thakhek District
- Coordinates: 17.39°N 104.82°E
- Province: Khammouane province
- Capital: Thakhek

Area
  - Total: 980 km^{2} (380 sq mi)

Population (2010 Census)
  - Total: 86,376
  - Density: 88/km^{2} (230/sq mi)
- Time zone: UTC+7 (ICT)

Thakhek District (Lao: ເມືອງທ່າແຂກ, romanized: Mueang Thakhek) is a district of Khammouane Province in central Laos. It serves as the provincial capital and is the most populated area of Khammouane province. The district is situated on the east bank of the Mekong River, opposite Nakhon Phanom Province in Thailand.

== Administrative divisions ==
The district consists of five communes (tasaeng), established in 2026.

Communes of Thakhek District
Laos Name	English Name
ສີໂຄດ	Sikhot
ດົງໃຕ້	Dong Tai
ນາເສ	Na Se
ນາມ່ວງ	Na Muang
ນາໂດນ	Na Don

== Transportation ==
Thakhek District is an important transportation hub in central Laos. Major transport infrastructure includes:

- Route 13 South
- Route 12
- Third Thai–Lao Friendship Bridge

== See also ==
- Khammouane Province
- Thakhek
- Third Thai–Lao Friendship Bridge
