= Xe Bang Fai River =

River in Laos

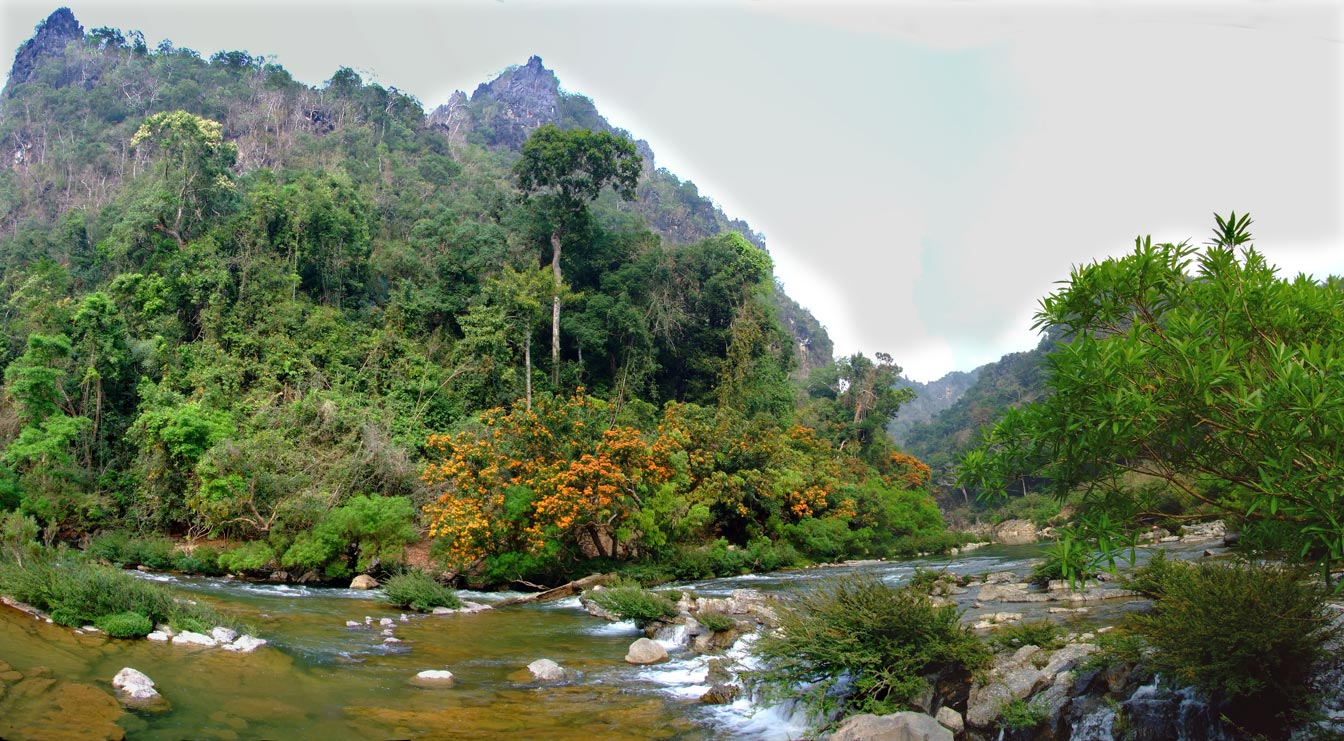
The Xe Ban Fai River, downstream the village of Ban Chalou, Khammouane, Laos

The Xe Bang Fai River (Nam Xebangfai) is a river in Laos. (Note: In Laotian generally nam is 'water', but in southern Laos a river is called xe or se. That is, Xe Bang Fai is "River Bang Fai". Sekong or Xekong means 'River Kong'.) It originates in the Annamite Range on the border between Laos and Vietnam at 17°3′1″N 106°20′54″E. It flows through Khammouane Province and Savannakhet Province.

== Xe Bang Fai River Cave ==
Xe Bang Fai River Cave is in Hin Namno National Park in Khammouane Province. It is believed to be one of the largest river caves in the world with passages some 120 meters tall and 200 meters wide, and a subterranean channel seven kilometres long. 17°22′24″N 105°50′14″E
