= Hineboun district =

Hinboun District ເມືອງຫີນບູນ
- District
- Coordinates: 17°52′N 104°34′E
- Country: Laos
- Province: Khammouane Province
- Time zone: UTC+7 (ICT)
- Area code: 12-04

Hinboun District (Lao : ຫີນບູນ) is a district (muang) of Khammouane Province in mid-Laos.
