= Boualapha district =

Coordinates: 17°18′26″N 105°45′44″E

Boualapha district ເມືອງບົວລະພາ
- Muang (District)
- Country: Laos
- Province: Khammouane
- Time zone: UTC+7 (ICT)

Boualapha is a district (muang) of Khammouane province in central Laos. Hin Namno National Park is in this district.
