= Nam Hinboun River =

River in Laos

The Nam Hinboun River is a river in Laos. It flows through Khammouane Province. The Nam Hai River flows into it; the area near where it joins the river is prone to flooding, which affects rice crops.
