= Hin Namno National Park =

National park in Khammouane Province, Laos

- IUCN category II (national park)
- Location within Laos
- Location: Khammouane Province
- Coordinates: 17.394000°N 105.886906°E
- Area: 941.21 km^{2} (363.40 sq mi)
- Designation: National Park
- Designated: January 2020
- Governing body: Ministry of Agriculture and Forestry

UNESCO World Heritage Site
- Part of: Phong Nha-Ke Bang National Park and Hin Nam No National Park
- Criteria: Natural: (viii), (ix), (x)
- Reference: 951bis
- Inscription: 2003 (27th Session)
- Extensions: 2015, 2025
- Area: 217,447 ha (839.57 sq mi)
- Buffer zone: 295,889 ha (1,142.43 sq mi)

Hin Namno National Park (or Hin Nam No, Lao: ຫີນໜາມໜໍ່) is in Boualapha District, Khammouane Province, Laos. The park borders Phong Nha-Kẻ Bàng National Park of Vietnam to the east and Nakai-Nam Theun National Park of Laos to the north. Hin Namno National Park was created by prime ministerial decree in January 2020. It is managed by the Ministry of Agriculture and Forestry (MAF).

Hin Namno's distinctive feature is its karst formations. If this park and Phong Nha-Kẻ Bàng to be combined into one contiguous park, it would be one of the largest protected karst regions in the world.

As Hin Namno lies between the Khammuan limestone belt and the Annamite Range, there are many caves and limestone escarpments including the Xe Bang Fai River Cave. It is believed to be one of the largest river caves in the world, with passages some 120 meters tall and 200 meters wide, and a subterranean channel seven kilometres long.

In early-2021, Hin Namno was nominated for inclusion on the International Union for Conservation of Nature (IUCN) Green List of Protected and Conserved Areas. The IUCN Green List is a global standard for protected area management performance. It was included in the World Heritage List in 2025 as an extension of the Phong Nha – Kẻ Bàng National Park in Vietnam.

== Flora and fauna ==
The national park is in the Northern Annamites rain forests ecoregion. 721.9 km^{2} or 77.5% of the park is covered in forest. Plant communities in the reserve include evergreen, mixed deciduous, and dipterocarp forests. The park includes areas of Central Indochina limestone karst forest, a distinctive plant community, also found in Phou Hin Poun reserve and in Vietnam, which is home to many endemic plants. The park is home to seven species of diurnal primates, all of conservation concern.

Hin Namno is home to 1,520 species of vascular plants and 536 vertebrate species. Important species living in the reserve include Douc and Francois’s langur, giant muntjac, fruit bat, harlequin bat, great evening bat, wreathed, and great hornbills and the sooty babbler.

== Resolutions ==
- Pursuance of the Forest Strategy for the Year 2020
- Pursuance of the Forestry Law No. 04/NA, dated 24/12/2007
- Pursuance of the Law on Wild Animals and Aquatic Resources No. 07/NA, dated24/12/2007.

== See also ==
- Protected areas of Laos
