= That Sikhottabong =

Buddhist temple in Thakhek, Khammouane Province, Laos

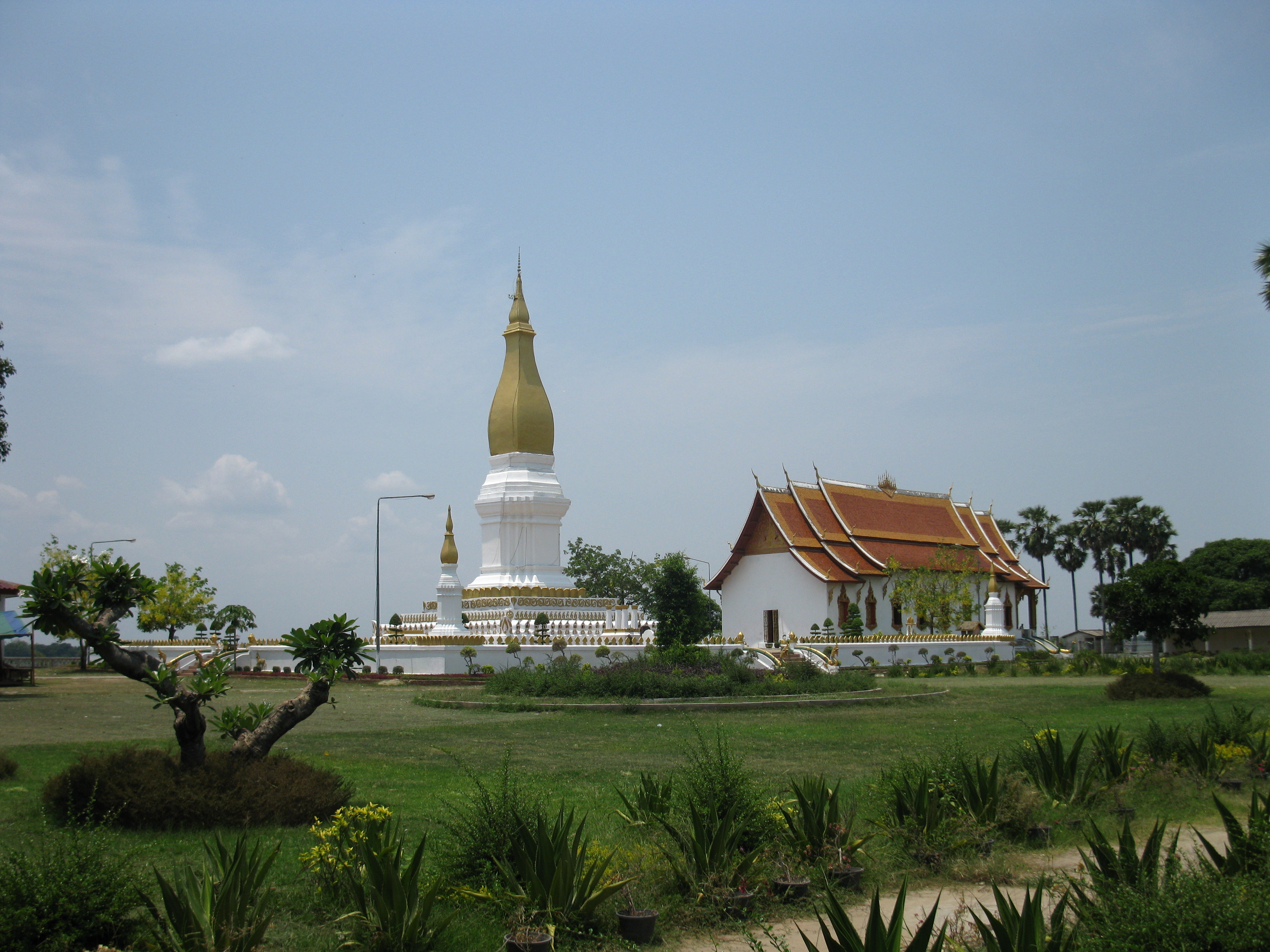
- That Sikhottabong of Thakhek

- Location within Laos

Religion
- Affiliation: Buddhism

Location
- Location: Thakhek, Khammouane Province, Laos
- Country: Laos
- Coordinates: 17.4359819°N 104.7404971°E

Architecture
- Founder: King Nanthasene

That Sikhottabong, also known as Sikhottabong Stupa, is a Buddhist temple in Thakhek, Khammouane Province, Laos. It is contemporary to That Inhang in Savannakhet and That Phanom, built in Thailand under the Sikhottabong Kingdom. The bones of Buddha are said to be consecrated in these temples. King Nanthasene built the stupa for King Soummitham.

The temple is on the bank of the Mekong River. The festival held at this location is during the third month of the lunar calendar.

== Architecture ==
That Sikhottabong was refurbished in the 16th century during the reign by King Setthathirath. The stupa has four squares with each side measuring 25,030 metres (82,120 ft) long. Its base is 14.33 square metres (154.2 sq ft) and rises to a height of 29 metres (95 ft).

The pinnacle appears in the shape of a banana flower.

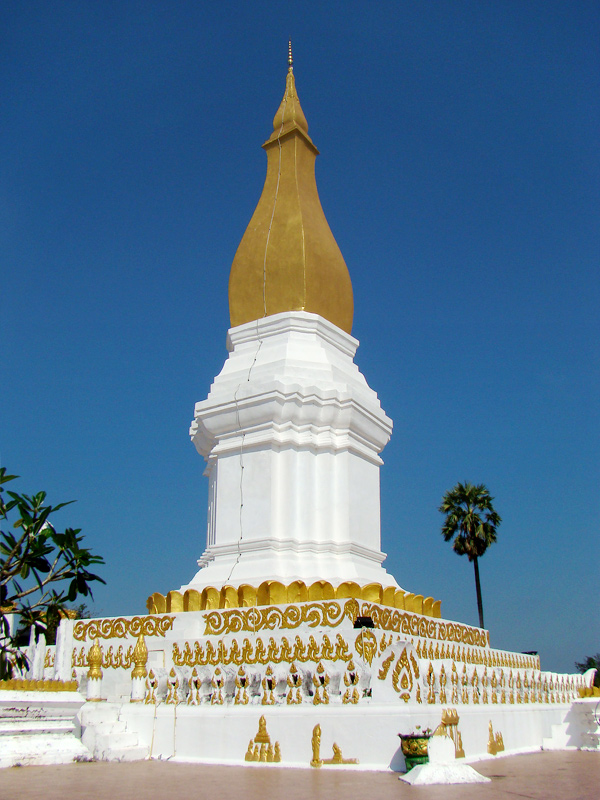

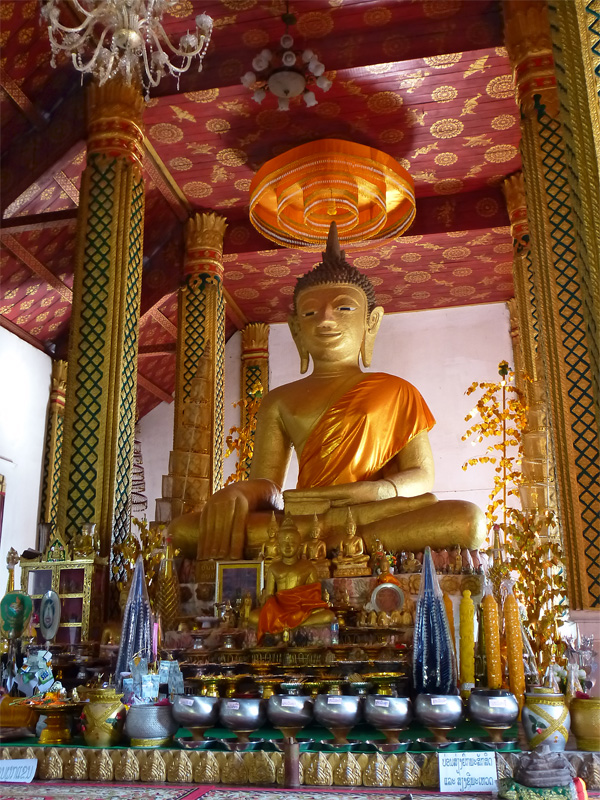
