= Thakhek =

Thakhek ທ່າແຂກ
- District & municipality
- Thakhek District
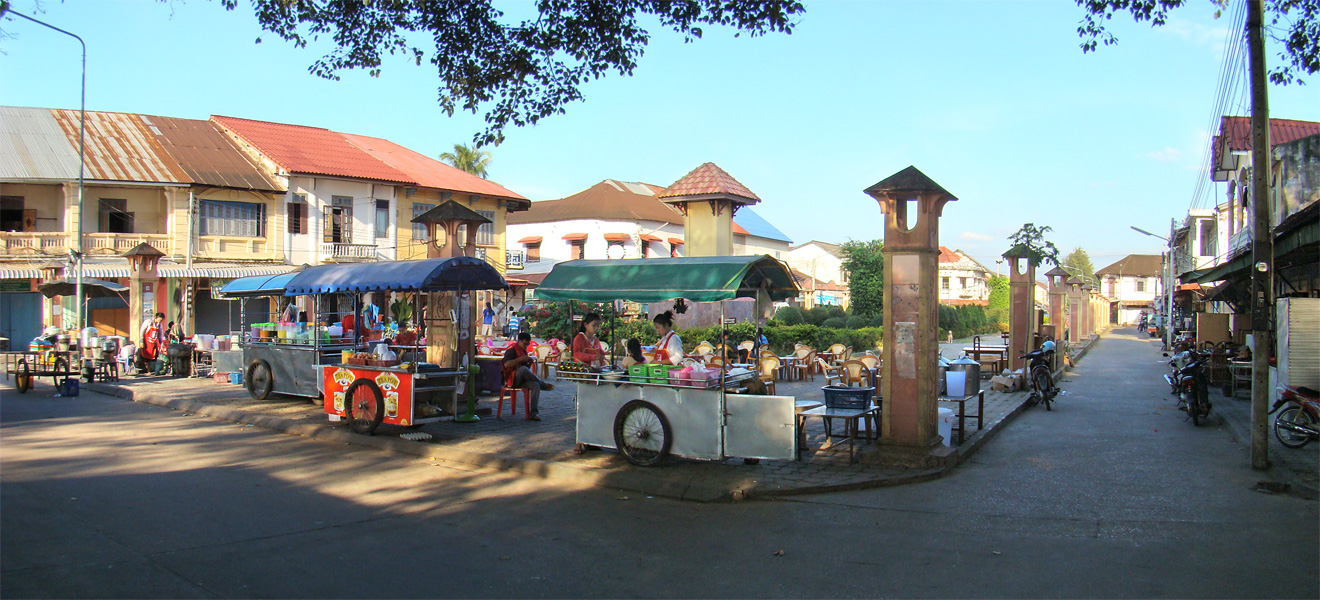
- Thakhek centre

- Thakek District

- Town location in Laos
- Coordinates: 17°24′N 104°48′E
- Country: Laos
- Province: Khammouane Province
- District: Thakhek District

Population (2015)
  - Total: 90,800
- Time zone: UTC+7 (ICT)

Thakhek (Lao: ທ່າແຂກ, pronounced [tʰāː kʰɛ̏ːk]), the capital of Khammouane Province, is a town in south-central Laos on the Mekong River and the administrative centre of the district with the same name. The Third Thai–Lao Friendship Bridge, linking Thakhek and Nakhon Phanom, Thailand, across the river, started in 2009 and was opened on 11 November 2011.

The city has French colonial style official buildings, villas, and shops. In 1943, 85% of the population of Thakhek were Vietnamese due to the French policy of encouraging Vietnamese immigrants to Laos. Remnants of the abortive Thakhek-Tan Ap railway can be seen in and near the town. The railway would have run between Thakhek and Tân Ấp Railway Station, Quảng Bình Province, Vietnam through the Mụ Giạ Pass.

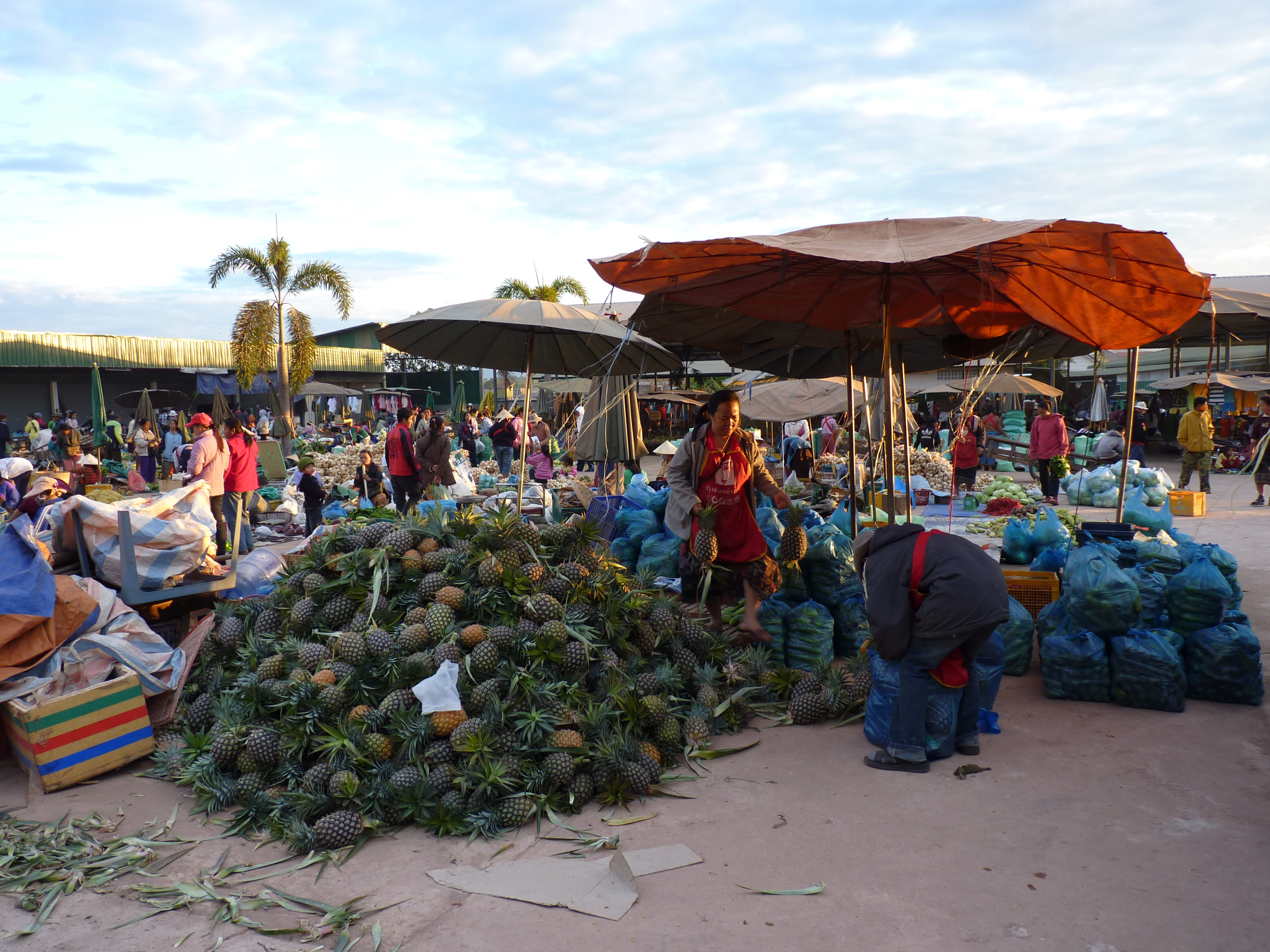
Lao people at the Souk Somboun Market.

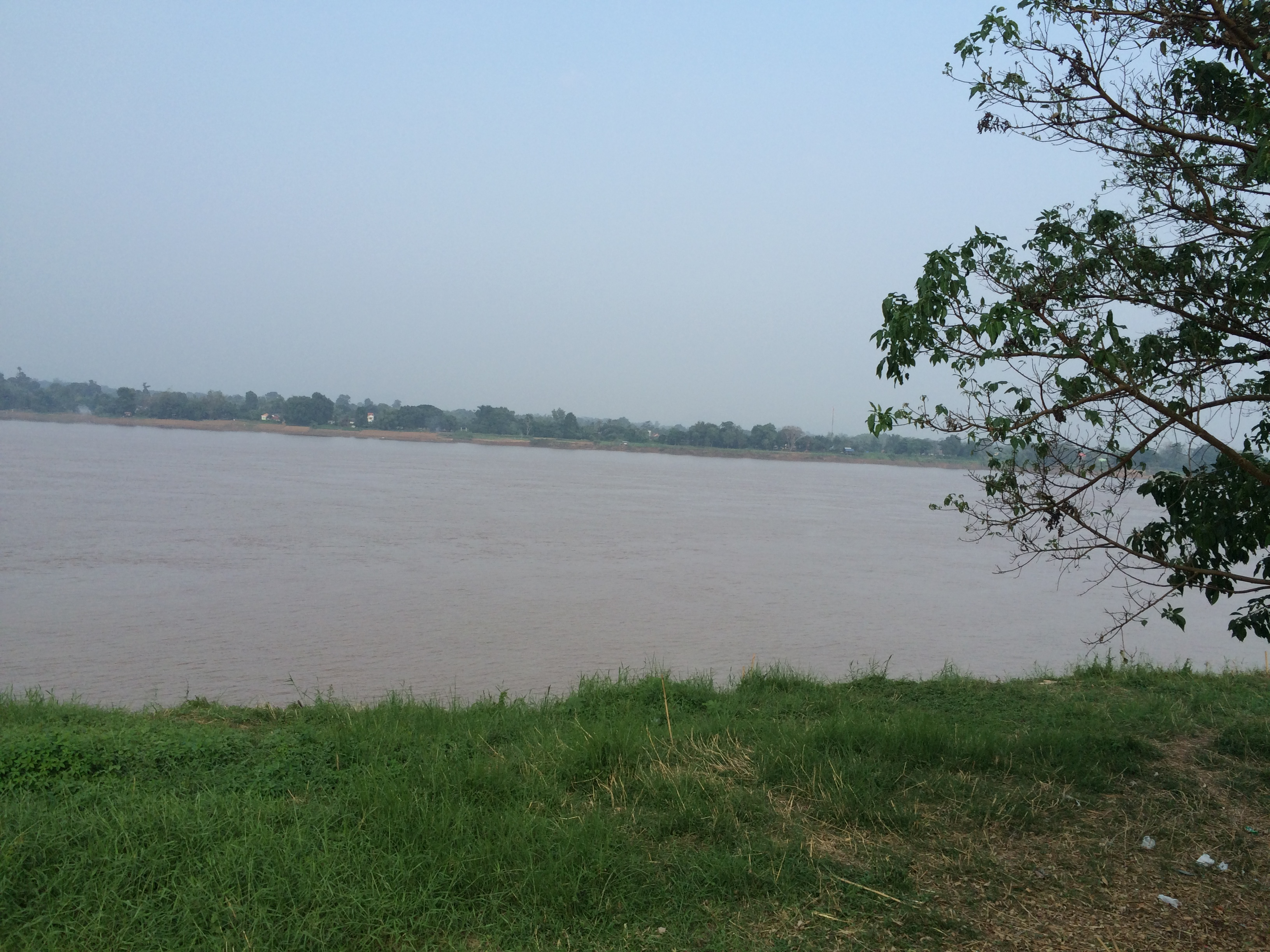
View of Thakhek from the banks of the Mekong in Nakhon Phanom.

== History ==
Thakhek was variously known as Sikhottabong, Muang Kabong, and Lakhon during the Lan Xang era.

== Climate ==
Climate data for Thakhek (1991–2020)
Month	Jan	Feb	Mar	Apr	May	Jun	Jul	Aug	Sep	Oct	Nov	Dec	Year
Record high °C (°F)	36.6 (97.9)	38.0 (100.4)	40.1 (104.2)	42.8 (109.0)	41.5 (106.7)	37.5 (99.5)	38.0 (100.4)	36.1 (97.0)	36.5 (97.7)	35.6 (96.1)	36.6 (97.9)	36.0 (96.8)	42.8 (109.0)
Mean daily maximum °C (°F)	29.3 (84.7)	31.2 (88.2)	33.6 (92.5)	34.8 (94.6)	33.7 (92.7)	32.0 (89.6)	31.1 (88.0)	30.8 (87.4)	31.4 (88.5)	31.6 (88.9)	31.0 (87.8)	29.1 (84.4)	31.6 (88.9)
Daily mean °C (°F)	24.2 (75.6)	26.0 (78.8)	28.6 (83.5)	30.3 (86.5)	29.7 (85.5)	28.7 (83.7)	28.1 (82.6)	27.9 (82.2)	28.1 (82.6)	27.9 (82.2)	26.6 (79.9)	24.3 (75.7)	27.5 (81.5)
Mean daily minimum °C (°F)	16.4 (61.5)	18.3 (64.9)	21.9 (71.4)	24.2 (75.6)	24.9 (76.8)	24.9 (76.8)	24.6 (76.3)	24.4 (75.9)	24.0 (75.2)	22.1 (71.8)	19.6 (67.3)	16.8 (62.2)	21.8 (71.2)
Record low °C (°F)	3.5 (38.3)	7.2 (45.0)	10.2 (50.4)	13.7 (56.7)	16.8 (62.2)	19.5 (67.1)	18.8 (65.8)	19.5 (67.1)	19.0 (66.2)	13.4 (56.1)	10.0 (50.0)	6.1 (43.0)	3.5 (38.3)
Average precipitation mm (inches)	4.2 (0.17)	22.1 (0.87)	50.8 (2.00)	79.3 (3.12)	238.9 (9.41)	342.2 (13.47)	545.9 (21.49)	562.6 (22.15)	314.0 (12.36)	103.0 (4.06)	13.4 (0.53)	2.6 (0.10)	2,279 (89.72)
Average precipitation days (≥ 1.0 mm)	1	2	5	8	15	20	24	25	19	9	3	1	132
Average relative humidity (%)	76.3	73.5	71.4	74.5	80.2	86.2	88.5	88.3	87.3	80.3	77.5	77.2	80.1
Mean monthly sunshine hours	253.4	223.9	215.4	216.7	196.3	137.7	129.4	119.3	147.2	208.1	238.9	253.8	2,340.1
Source 1: NOAA
Source 2: The Yearbook of Indochina (1932-1933, humidity 1930-1933)
