= Khammouane province =

Province of Laos

Khammouane province ແຂວງ ຄໍາມ່ວນ
- Province
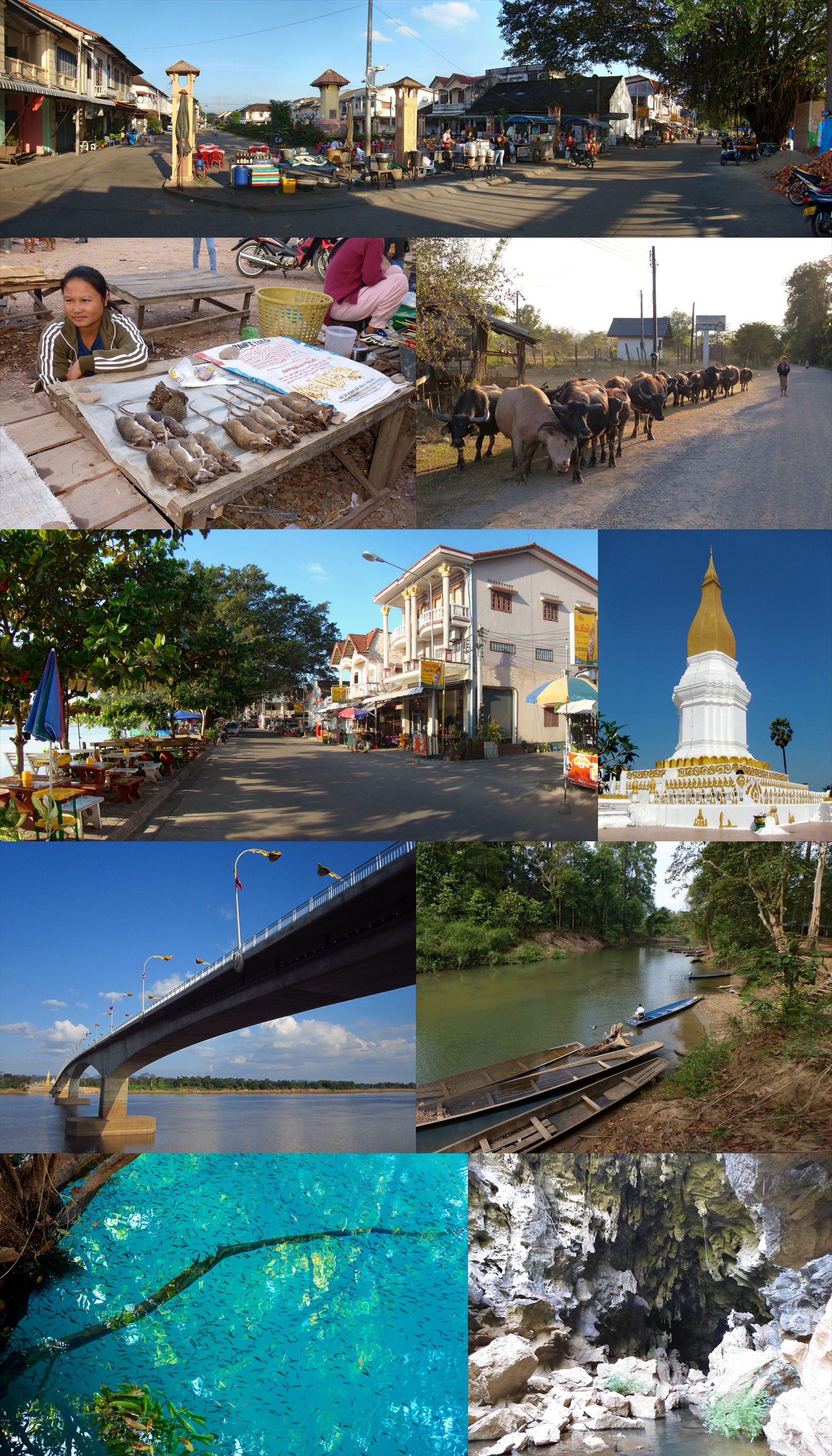

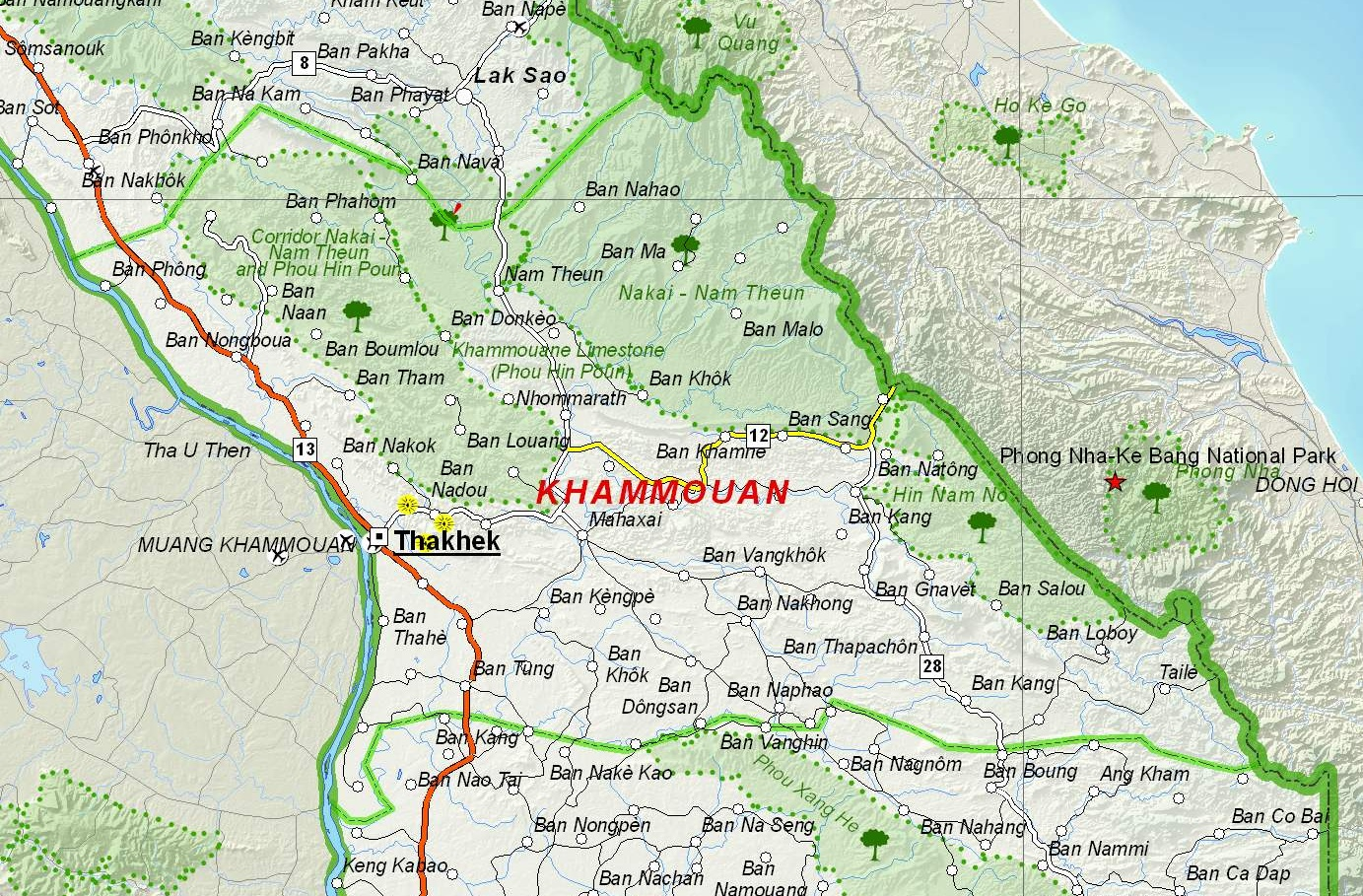
- Map of Khammouane province

- Location of Khammouane province in Laos
- Coordinates: 17.5°N 105.333333°E
- Country: Laos
- Capital: Thakhek

Area
  - Total: 16,315 km^{2} (6,299 sq mi)

Population (2020 Census)
  - Total: 433,570
  - Density: 26.575/km^{2} (68.829/sq mi)
- Time zone: UTC+7 (ICT)
- ISO 3166 code: LA-KH
- HDI (2022): ▲0.602 medium 9th

Khammouane province (Khammouan) (Lao: ຄໍາມ່ວນ, pronounced [kʰám mūan]) is a province in southern Laos. Its capital is Thakhek. Khammouane province covers an area of 16,315 square kilometres (6,299 sq mi), most of which is forested mountainous terrain. The forests of the Nakai-Nam Theun National Park contains streams that feed Mekong tributaries and form the catchment area for Nam Theun 2, the largest hydropower project in Laos. The Xe Bang Fai River, Nam Hinboun River, and the Nam Theun are some of the rivers of the province.

Part of the aborted Thakhek-Tan Ap railway would have crossed the province to connect with the North-South Railway at Tân Ấp Railway Station, Quảng Bình province, Vietnam through Mụ Giạ Pass. Khammouane's human development index is 0.602 which is less than the Laos average of 0.620.

== Geography ==
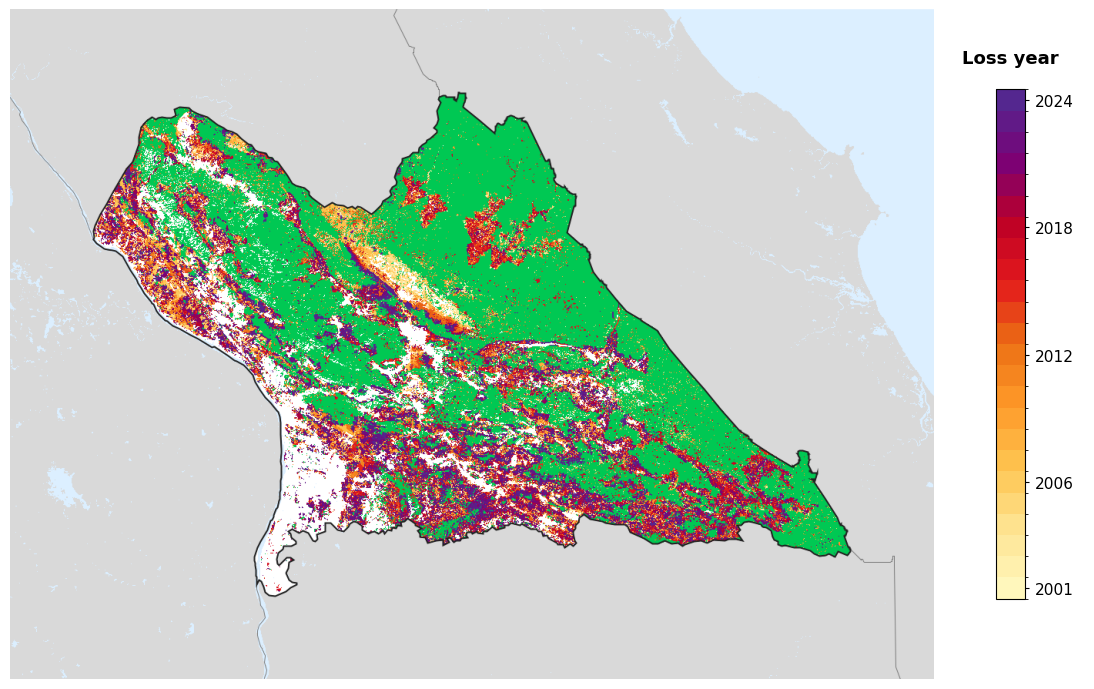
Tree-cover loss year in Khammouane, 2001-2024, from the Global Forest Change dataset.

Khammouane province covers an area of 16,315 square kilometres (6,299 sq mi) and is mostly of forested mountainous terrain. The province is bordered by Bolikhamsai province to the north and northwest, Vietnam to the east, Savannakhet province to the south, and Thailand to the west. Streams flow through the province to join the Mekong River. Some rivers originating in the mountains of the province are the Xebangfay River (239 kilometres (149 mi) long), Nam Hinboun, Nam Theun, and Nam Ngum River. Between the Mekong and the Annamite Range, the Khammouane Plateau features gorges, grottoes, jungles, limestone hills, and rivers.

Thakhek, the provincial capital, is on the Mekong River bordering Thailand. The border checkpoint is near Nakhon Phanom. The city features buildings designed in the French colonial architectural style. The Third Thai–Lao Friendship Bridge, opened on 11 November 2011, spans the Mekong River.

Tham Khonglor Cave (literally: 'beauty in the dark') is part of the National Protected Forest Area at Hinboun Mountain. Its west entrance is from Ban Khonglor village in Hinboun District, while the east entrance is from Ban Natan village, Nakai District. The cave runs for a length of about 7.4 kilometres (4.6 mi). The Hinboun River flows through the cave perennially. Vang That and Had Xay Luang are the two hanging rock formations in the cave. The cave is approachable along two routes, one from Vientiane along Route 13 to Hinboun District, and the second route is by boat along the Hinboun River.

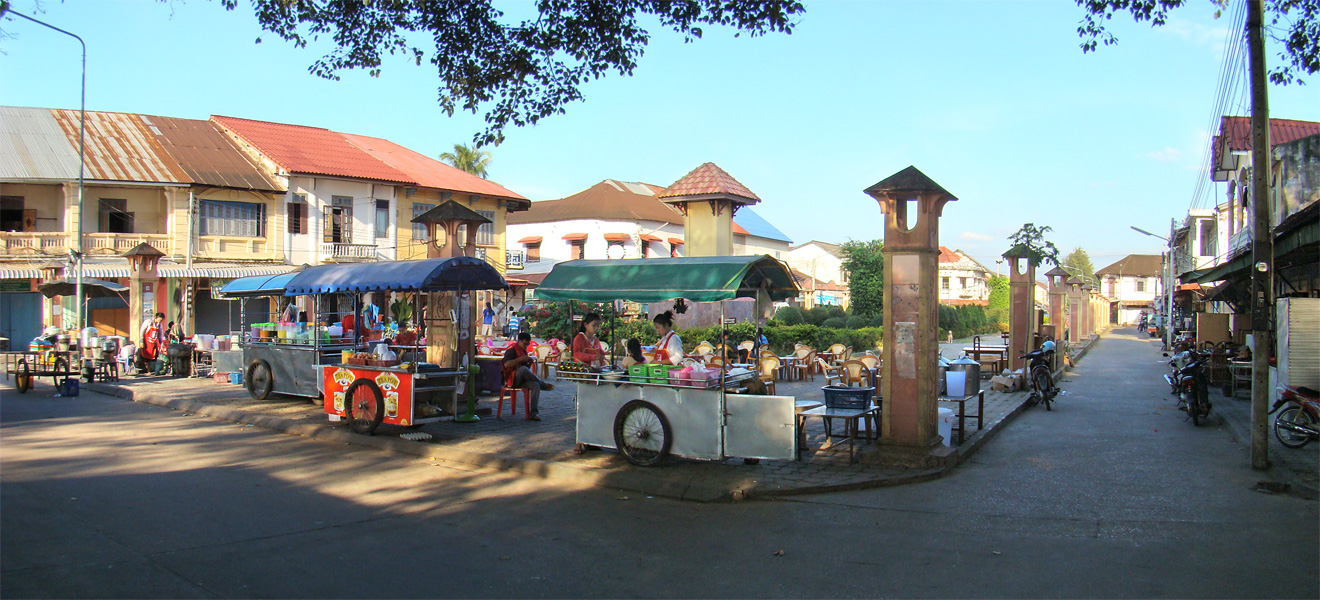
Thakhek

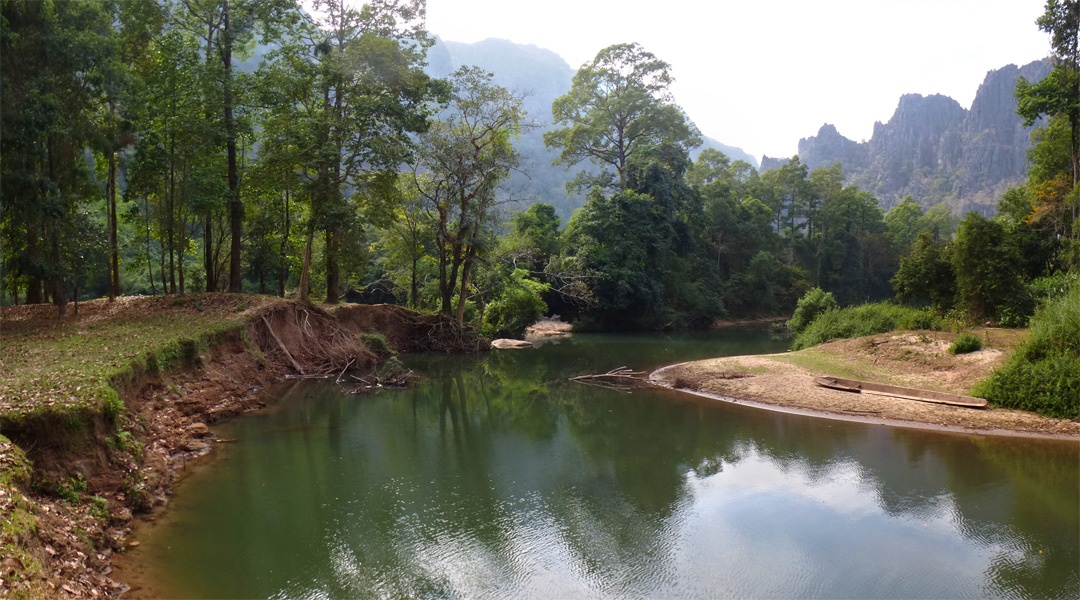
Hinboun River

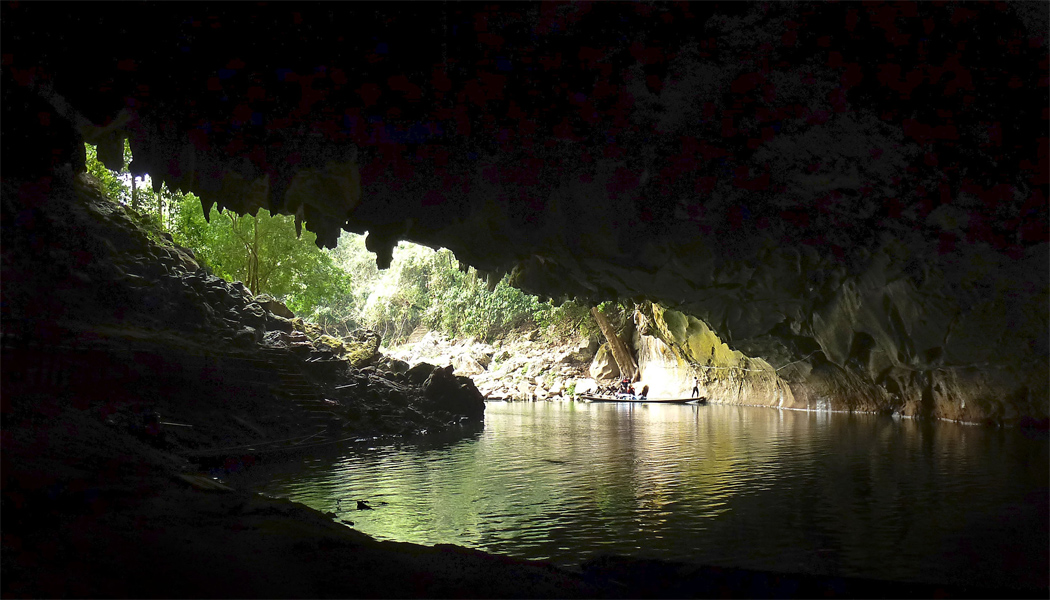
Tham Khonglor

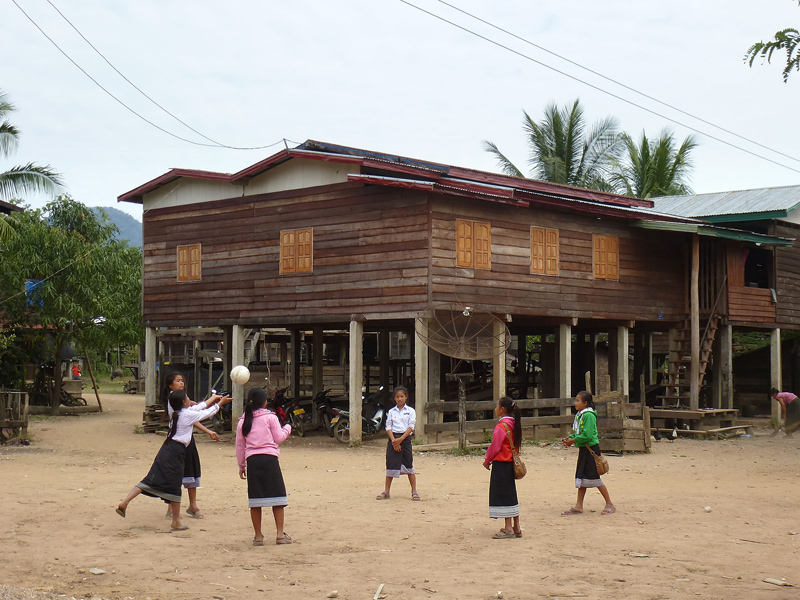
Ban Natan

== Protected areas ==
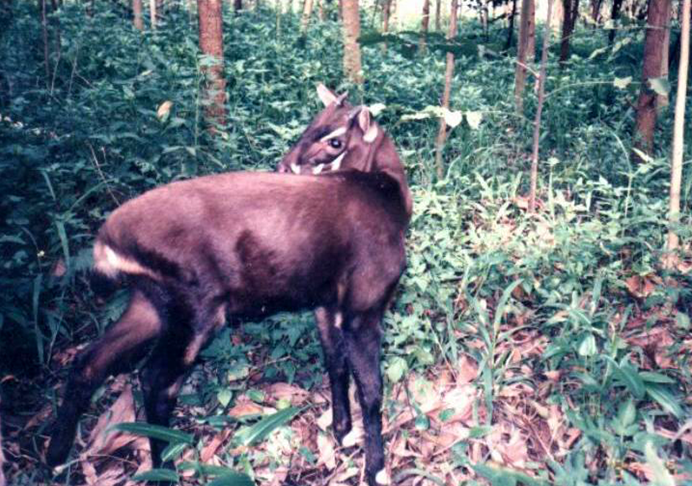
Saola (Pseudoryx nghetinhensis) found in Laos

The province's forest areas consists of three reserve areas. These are the Nakai-Nam Theun National Park, which covers an area of 352,200 ha of the Annamite Range and the adjacent Nakai Plateau in the provinces of Khammouane and Bolikhamxay, the Hin Namno National Park with an area of 86,229 ha, and the Phou Hin Poun National Biodiversity Conservation Area with an area of 150,000 ha. These forests have natural caves.

In 1996, scientists discovered a rodent in Khammouan belonging to a taxonomic family (Laonastidae) that had been previously known only from fossils. The Laotian rock rat or kha-nyou (Laonastes aenigmamus), also called the "rat-squirrel", was formally described as a new species in a 2005 article by Paulina Jenkins et al., who considered the animal to be distinct from all living rodents.

Other mammals living in the province include the following: saola, giant muntjac, Roosevelt's muntjac, Truong Son muntjac, Indochinese warty pig, Heude's pig, Annamite striped rabbit, Javan rhinoceros (Rhinoceros sondaicus annamiticus), Indochinese tiger, and Asian elephant.

=== Important bird areas ===
The 68,125 hectare Hin Nam No (also Hin Namno) Important Bird Area (IBA) is in the Hin Namno NBCA. Its topography features sparsely vegetated limestone karst outcrops, and limestone hills. Vietnamese crested argus (Rheinardia ocellata) and Austen's brown hornbill (Anorrhinus austeni) are classified as near threatened. The inornate squirrel (Callosciurus inornatus) has been identified as important fauna within the IBA.

The Khammouane IBA is in the Phou Hin Poun NBCA. The IBA is 79,000 ha in size with an elevation of 200–900 metres (660–2,950 ft). The topography and habitat are characterized by sparsely vegetated limestone karst, semi-evergreen forest, and mixed deciduous forest. The IBA is known for supporting the sooty babbler (Stachyris herberti) and François' langur (Trachypithecus francoisi).

== Demographics ==
The population of the province according to the 2015 census is 392,052.

== Administrative divisions ==
The province is composed of the following nine districts:

Map	Code	Name	Lao script
	12-01	Thakhek District	ເມືອງທ່າແຂກ
	12-02	Mahaxay District	ເມືອງມະຫາໄຊ
	12-03	Nong Bok District	ເມືອງໜອງບົກ
	12-04	Hineboun District	ເມືອງຫີນບູນ
	12-05	Yommalath District	ເມືອງຍົມມະລາດ
	12-06	Boualapha District	ເມືອງບົວລະພາ
	12-07	Nakai District	ເມືອງນາກາຍ
	12-08	Sebangphay District	ເມືອງເຊບັ້ງໄຟ
	12-09	Xaibouathong District	ເມືອງໄຊບົວທອງ
	12-10	Kounkham District	ເມືອງຄູນຄຳ

== Economy ==
Thakhek, the provincial capital, is a trade centre. Along with Bolikhamsai and Savannakhet provinces, Khammouane is one of the main tobacco producing areas of Laos. There are minew in the province, including Mining Development Economy Corporation mining gypsum in Thakhek District, LAVICO Co. Ltd, which is a Laos-Vietnam joint venture mining gypsum in Xebangfay District, V.S.K. Co. Ltd mining limestone in Thakhek District, and Lao-North Korea Tin Mines in Hinboun District.

Tourism is a growing sector of the provincial economy. In 2024, the province hosted over 800,000 tourists, generating over US$46 million in revenue. The provincial government is implementing initiatives to increase the number of events and eco-friendly tourism activities in 2025.

== Landmarks ==
That Sikhottabong, also known as Sikhottabong Stupa, is a contemporary of That Inhangin Savannakhet and That Phanom, built in Thailand under the Sikhottabong Empire. The bones of Buddha are said to be consecrated in these temples. King Nanthasene built the stupa for King Soummitham, on the banks of the Mekong. It was refurbished in the 15th century during the reign by King Saysethathirath. The stupa has four squares with each side measuring 25,030 metres (82,120 ft) long and its base is 14.33 square metres (154.2 sq ft) and rises to a height of 29 metres (95 ft). The pinnacle has the shape of the banana flower.

The Great Wall, made of stone, begins on the west side of Thakhek. It is 8 kilometres (5.0 mi) from the city, on Route 13. It extends from the Namdone River and its total length is about 15 kilometres (9.3 mi). Its construction is attributed to the period of the Sikhottabong Empire in the 19th century and is later proposed to be preserved as a national heritage site.

Other attractions include: Tad Kham Waterfall (about 52 kilometers from Thakhek District), Tad Nam Khengkam Waterfall (about 37 km east of Thakhek District), Wat Pha Sokkhamsene Temple (an old temple near Nongbok District and about 37 km from Thakhek District), and That Thumphavang Stupa (north of Nongbok District).

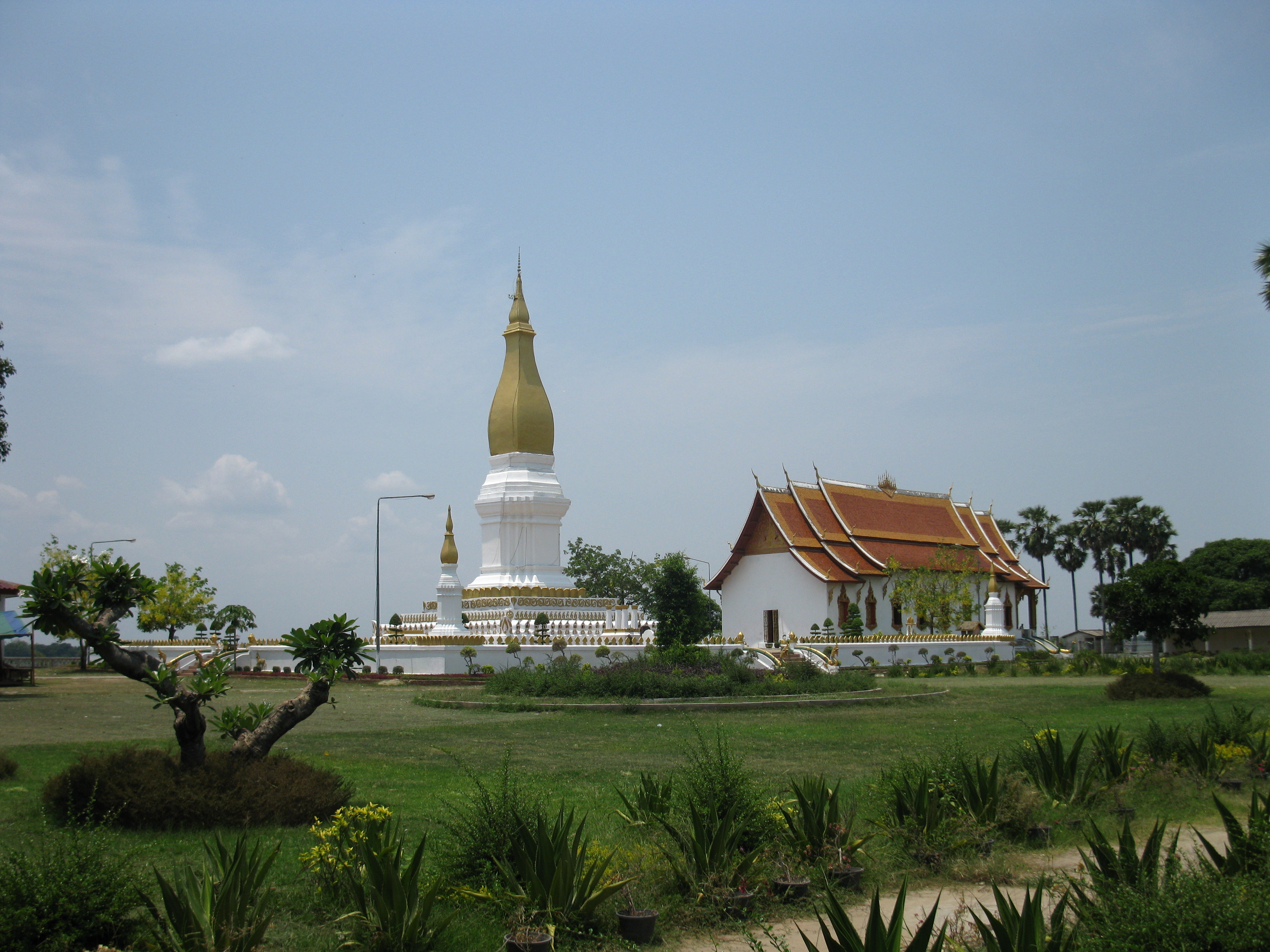
That Sikhottabong

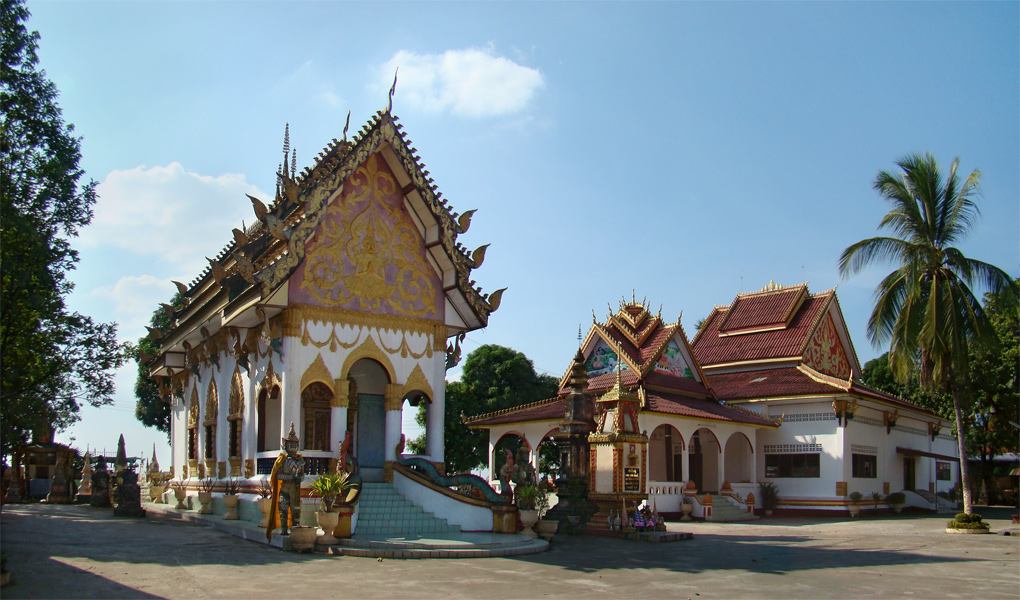
Vat Nabo

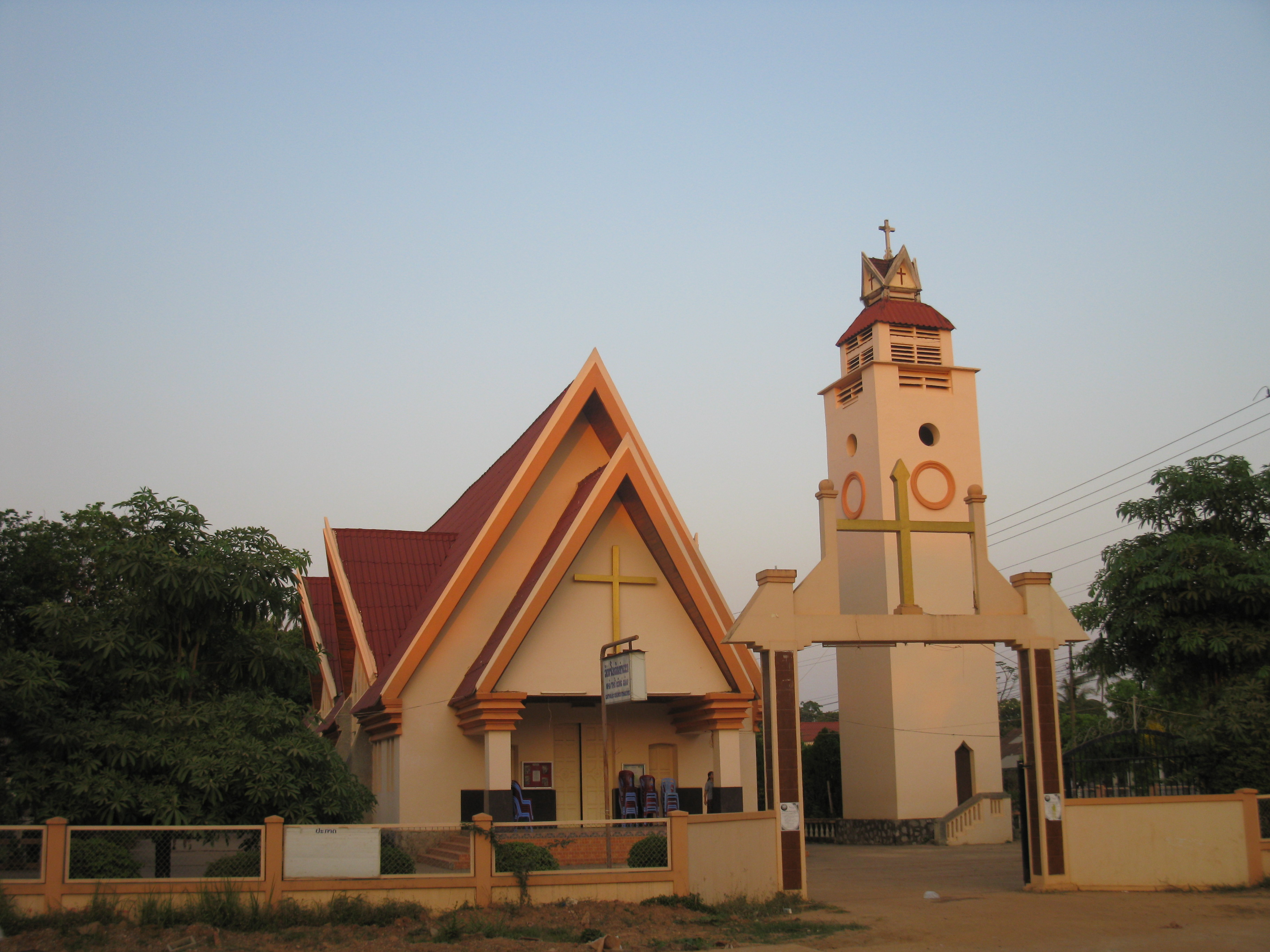
Catholic Church of Thakhek

== Bibliography ==
- Geological Survey (U.S.) (25 October 2010). Minerals Yearbook: Area Reports: International 2008: Asia and the Pacific. Government Printing Office. pp. 14–. ISBN 978-1-4113-2964-5.
- Mansfield, Stephen; Koh, Magdalene (1 September 2008). Laos. Marshall Cavendish. pp. 9–. ISBN 978-0-7614-3035-3.
