= Ky Anh (disambiguation) =

Kỳ Anh is the name of the following geographical locations in Hà Tĩnh Province, Vietnam:

- Kỳ Anh, a commune of Hà Tĩnh province
- Kỳ Anh (town), a former district-level town
- Kỳ Anh district, a former rural district
- Former Kỳ Anh township, dissolved in 2015 to form the ward of Sông Trí of Kỳ Anh town
