= Kỳ Anh =

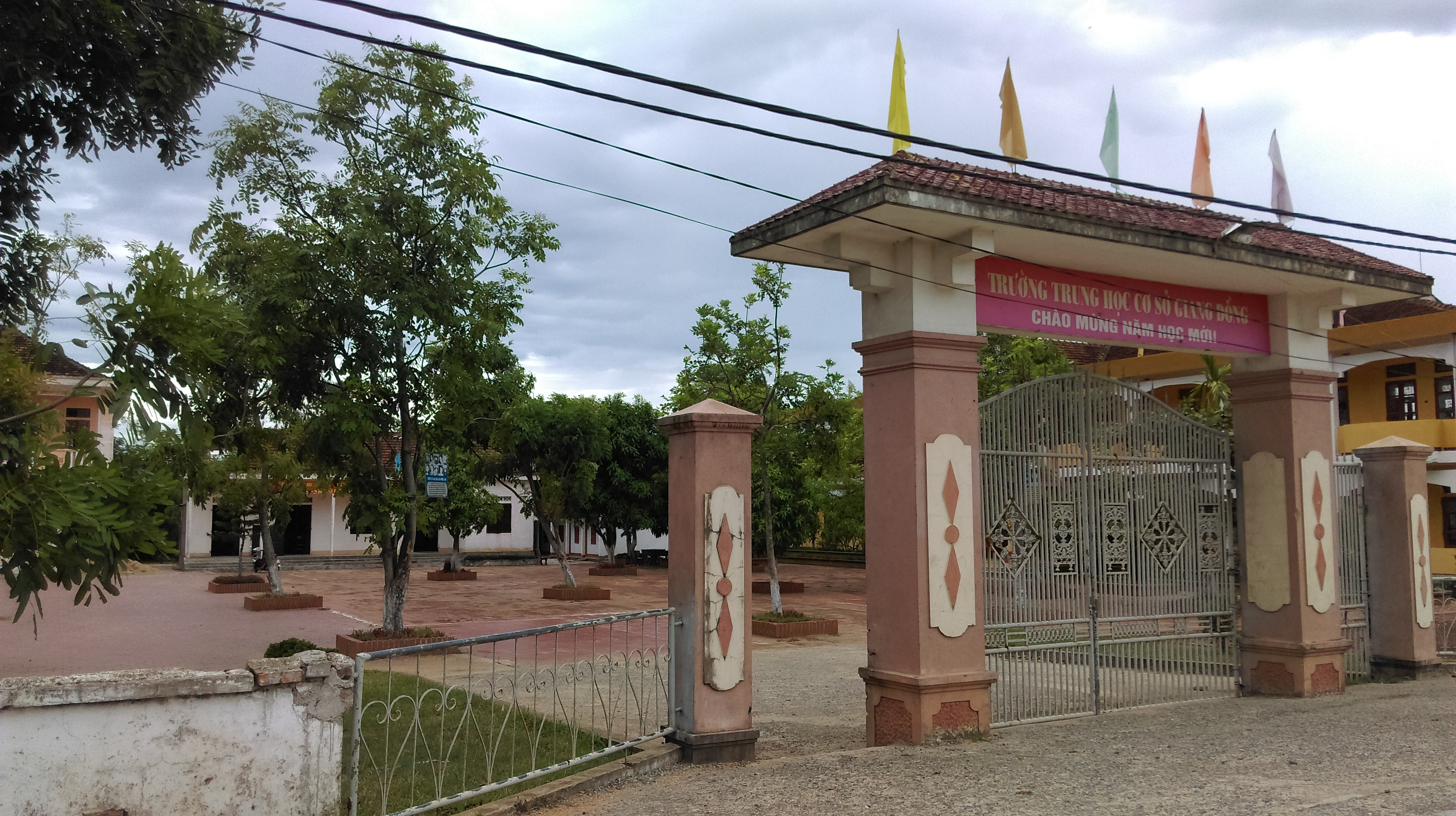
- Nguyễn Trọng Bình Secondary School
- Interactive map of Kỳ Anh
- Coordinates: 18.178392289919778°N 106.23899854042753°E
- Country: Vietnam
- Region: North Central Coast
- Province: Hà Tĩnh
- Established: 16 June 2025
- Administrative headquarters: Kỳ Đồng Hamlet

Area
  - Total: 64.74 km^{2} (25.00 sq mi)

Population (31 December 2024)
  - Total: 32,689
  - Density: 505/km^{2} (1,310/sq mi)

Kỳ Anh is a commune in Hà Tĩnh province, Vietnam.

Kỳ Anh commune was formerly part of Kỳ Anh district, Hà Tĩnh province.

On 16 June 2025, the Standing Committee of the National Assembly of Vietnam issued Resolution No. 1665/NQ-UBTVQH15. Under the resolution, the entire area and population of Kỳ Đồng township, Kỳ Giang commune, Kỳ Tiến commune, and Kỳ Phú commune were merged to form a new commune named Kỳ Anh.
