= Bình Quới =

Bình Quới Phường Bình Quới Bình Quới Tây
- Ward
- Bình Quới seen from above with Thanh Đa Bridge crosses Thanh Đa Canal
- Interactive map of Bình Quới
- Coordinates: 10°49′39″N 106°44′13″E
- Country: Vietnam
- Municipality: Ho Chi Minh City
- Established: June 16, 2025

Area
  - Total: 2.45 sq mi (6.34 km^{2})

Population (2024)
  - Total: 46,200
  - Density: 18,900/sq mi (7,290/km^{2})
- Time zone: UTC+07:00 (Indochina Time)
- Administrative code: 26911

Bình Quới (Vietnamese: Phường Bình Quới) is a ward of Ho Chi Minh City, Vietnam, its boundaries encompass the entire Bình Quới – Thanh Đa Peninsula (Vietnamese: Bán đảo Bình Quới – Thanh Đa; often shortened as Thanh Đa Peninsula or Bình Quới Peninsula) located along the Saigon River. It is one of the 168 new wards, communes and special zones of the city following the reorganization in 2025.

Despite being located next to the heart of the city, most of this peninsula still resembles a rural area due to a planning project that has been stalled for over 25 years. The typical landscape here consists of rice paddies, ponds, and swamps, contrasting sharply with the high-rise buildings, apartments, and villas on the other side of the Saigon River such as in Thảo Điền area of An Khánh.

== Geography ==
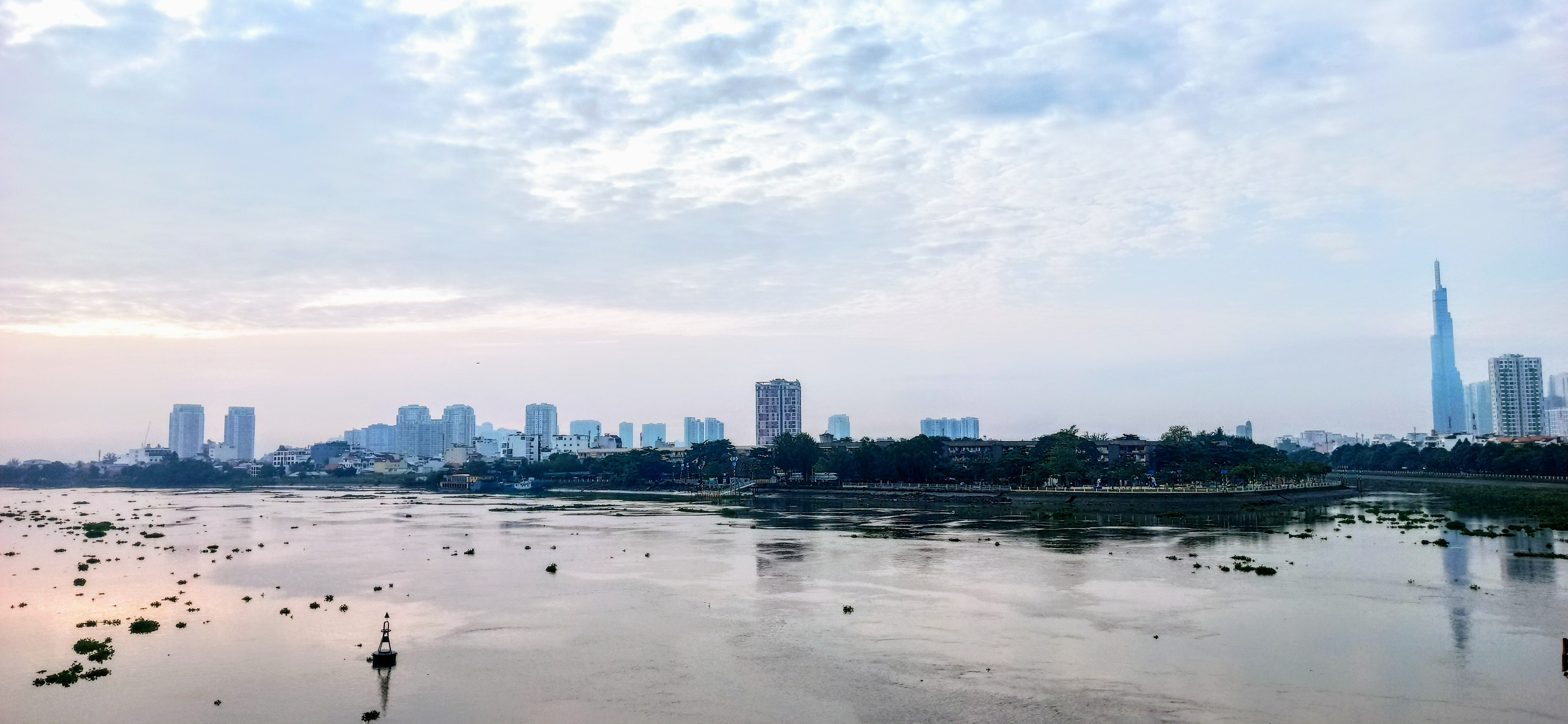
Bình Quới – Thanh Đa seen from Bình Triệu Bridge

Bình Quới or Bình Quới – Thanh Đa, is just 5 km away to the north of city center (Saigon), although commonly known as peninsula as the waterway this area adjacent to is only the Saigon River from most side but in reality, this area is now an island because it is further surrounded by the Thanh Đa Canal, which was dug during the French colonial period.

Binh Quới borders former Thủ Đức City across the Saigon River to the south, east, and north, which now face wards of An Khánh, Thủ Đức and Hiệp Bình, respectively. To the west, it borders the rest of former Bình Thạnh district (now is wards of Bình Thạnh and Thạnh Mỹ Tây) by Thanh Đa Canal. The only current road access is via Kinh Thanh Đa Bridge (or simply Kinh Bridge) along the route of Xô Viết Nghệ Tĩnh – Bình Quới in the southwest of the peninsula. Another route is Bình Quới Ferry Line (it used to be Bình Quới small boat terminal) between the northeast end of Bình Quới Road with Road No. 36 in Linh Đông area in Thủ Đức in the northeast.

It is divided into two areas: Thanh Đa area (corresponding to Ward 27) and Bình Quới Tây area (or simply Bình Quới, corresponding to Ward 28). Bình Quới area occupies the majority of the land, with scattered residential areas. A large portion of the land here consists of swamps and abandoned plots due to stalled development plans, which residents utilize for rice cultivation or fish farming. Thanh Đa area includes the Thanh Đa Residential Complex (Cư xá Thanh Đa) with older apartment buildings dating back to before 1975 and is somewhat more bustling than Bình Quới due to its closer proximity to the central districts.

According to Official Letter No. 2896/BNV-CQĐP dated May 27, 2025, from the Ministry of Home Affairs, Bình Quới ward will have an area of 6.34 km², population is 46,200 people, density is 18,900 people/km², as of December 31, 2024 (Article 6 of Resolution No. 76/2025/UBTVQH15 dated April 14, 2025, of the Standing Committee of the National Assembly).

== History ==
Under the Nguyễn Dynasty, the area of present-day Binh Qưới – Thanh Đa belonged to the villages of Thạnh Đa and Bình Quới Tây, Bình Trị Thượng commune, Bình Dương district (or county), Tân Bình prefecture (fu), Gia Định province. Later, due to the removal of diacritical marks when printing on maps during the French colonial period, the name of Thạnh Đa village changed to Thanh Đa as it is today. In 1897, the French colonialists built a canal through the area of Thanh Đa village (which is the Thanh Đa Channel today). The canal is a kilometer long, 40 m wide and 6 m deep. It cuts around the Saigon River from Bình Lợi to An Phú and shortens the waterway by 12 km, helping boats save time traveling on the Saigon River. The channel was dug in just a year, and from then on the peninsula became an island (cù lao) as it is today.

In 1911, Gia Định province was divided into four districts: Thủ Đức, Nhà Bè, Gò Vấp and Hóc Môn. The Bình Quới – Thanh Đa area at that time belonged to Thạnh Mỹ Tây village (a village formed by merging the old Thạnh Đa, Phú Mỹ, and Bình Quới Tây hamlets), Bình Trị Thượng commune, Gò Vấp district. After 1956, Thạnh Mỹ Tây village was called Thạnh Mỹ Tây commune.

In 1976, Bình Thạnh district was established by separating the two communes of Bình Hòa (now Bình Thạnh and Bình Lợi Trung) and Thạnh Mỹ Tây from the old Gò Vấp district. Since then, the Thanh Đa peninsula area has belonged to wards 27 and 28 of Bình Thạnh district until today.

On June 16, 2025, the National Assembly Standing Committee issued Resolution No. 1685/NQ-UBTVQH15 on the arrangement of commune-level administrative units of Ho Chi Minh City in 2025 (effective from June 16, 2025). Accordingly, the entire land area and population of Ward 27 and Ward 28 of the former Bình Thạnh district will be integrated into a new ward named Bình Quới (Clause 46, Article 1).

== Agencies ==
Current agencies	Address	Former agencies
People's Committee	No. 1 Thanh Đa Street (or No. 1 Thanh Đa Administrative Area)	Party Committee, People's Council - People's Committee of former Ward 27
People's Council	No. 1 Thanh Đa Street (or No. 1 Thanh Đa Administrative Area)	Party Committee, People's Council - People's Committee of former Ward 27
Party Committee	No. 1 Thanh Đa Street (or No. 1 Thanh Đa Administrative Area)	Party Committee, People's Council - People's Committee of former Ward 27
Police Office	No. 1 Thanh Đa Street (or No. 1 Thanh Đa Administrative Area)	Former Police Office of Ward 27
Public Administration Service Center	No. 1 Thanh Đa Street (or No. 1 Thanh Đa Administrative Area)	Public Administrative Service Center of Ward 27
Fatherland Front Committee	311 Bình Quới Road	Party Committee, People's Council - People's Committee of former Ward 28
Military Command	313 Bình Quới Road	Military Command of former Ward 28
Public Service Center	No. 20 Thanh Đa Sreet (Thanh Đa Market)	None
Investment and Construction Project Management Board	Next to Block G, Thanh Đa Apartment	Former site of Thanh Đa High School
Bureau of Economy, Infrastructure and Urban Development	Next to Block G, Thanh Đa Apartment	Former site of Thanh Đa High School
Bureau of Culture and Social Affairs	Next to Block G, Thanh Đa Apartment	Former site of Thanh Đa High School
Health Station	Main point: No. 1 Thanh Đa Street (or No. 1 Thanh Đa Administrative Area)	Former Ward 27 Health Station
Health Station	Point 1: 319/22 (Former: 1003) Bình Quới Road	Former Ward 28 Health Station
Thanh Đa Post	138A Bình Quới Road	None

== Education ==
Current	Former	Địa chỉ
Bình Quới Tây Primary and Secondary School (new)	Bình Quới Tây Primary School	Campus 1: 376 Bình Quới Road
Bình Quới Tây Primary and Secondary School (new)	Bình Quới Tây Secondary School	Campus 2: 376A Bình Quới Road (Alley 352 Bình Quới Road)
Thanh Đa Secondary School (new)	Thanh Đa Secondary School (old)	Main campus: 1/40 Thanh Đa Street
Thanh Đa Secondary School (new)	Cù Chính Lan Secondary School	Campus 2: 17/49 Thanh Đa Street
Thanh Đa Primary School	None	No. 15 Thanh Đa Street
Bình Quới Kindergarten (new)	Kindergarten No. 27	Main campus: 17/2 Thanh Đa Street
Bình Quới Kindergarten (new)	Kindergarten No. 28	Branch: 982Bis Bình Quới Road

Particularly, Thanh Đa High School, has now moved to a new location on Nguyễn Xí Street in Ward 26 (now Bình Thạnh Ward).

== Thanh Đa Residetial Complex ==
Thanh Đa Apartments on Saigon River

Thanh Đa Residential Complex (Cư xá Thanh Đa) is one of the first apartment buildings in Saigon, built before 1975. Currently, there are about 4,300 households residing in 22 apartment blocks, some of which are in a state of disrepair.

== Tourism ==
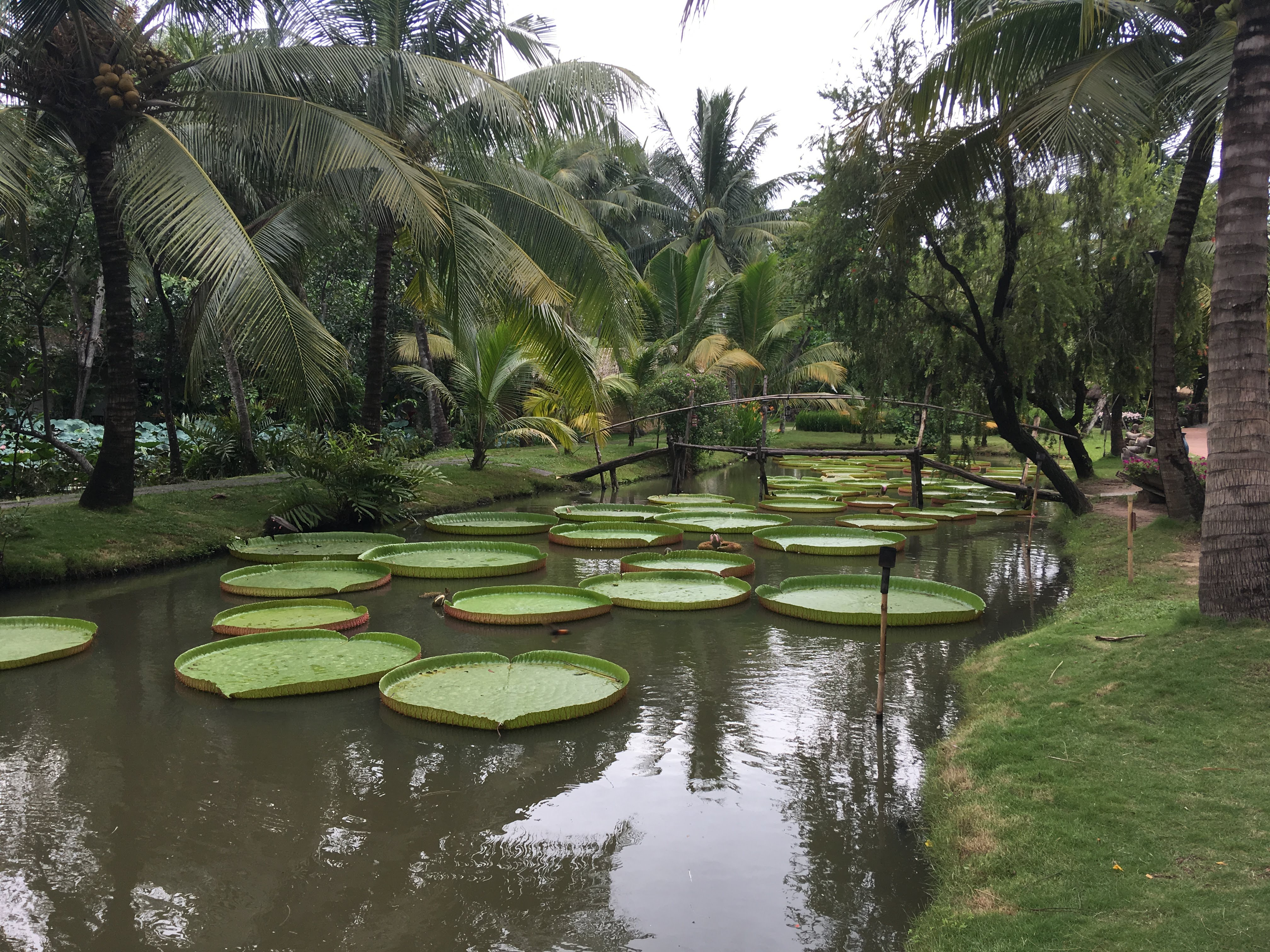
Bình Quới Tourist Village

Currently, a portion of the land on the peninsula in the Binh Quoi area is being used for restaurants and eco-tourism resorts along the riverbank, such as Bình Quới Tourist Village 1, 2, and for activities like recreational fishing and water sports.

This is a popular weekend getaway for many locals due to its location within the city, its cool riverside climate, and its relatively complete range of recreational services.

== Urban planning ==
In 1992, the Bình Quới – Thanh Đa urban area project was approved by the People's Committee of Ho Chi Minh City. In 2004, the project was assigned to the Saigon Construction Corporation for investment and construction, but the corporation failed to implement it, so in 2010, the government revoked the decision.

In 2015, the joint venture between Bitexco Group and Emaar Properties PJSC (an Emirati real estate company in Dubai) was selected as the investor with a total capital of over 30,000 billion VND. The project implementation period was 50 years from the date of contract signing. However, in 2017, Emaar Properties PJSC withdrew from the project because the time for land clearance and compensation for residents was too long and they did not have enough patience to wait until the land was handed over.

In July 2026, the Bình Quới – Thanh Đa Urban Area project, with a total investment of nearly 100,000 billion VND (approximately nearly 4 billion USD), received investment approval from the Ho Chi Minh City People's Committee and was assigned to a strategic investor consortium including: Sun Group JSC, Mặt Trời Hạ Long Company Limited, and Thành phố Mặt Trời Company Limited.

== Gallery ==
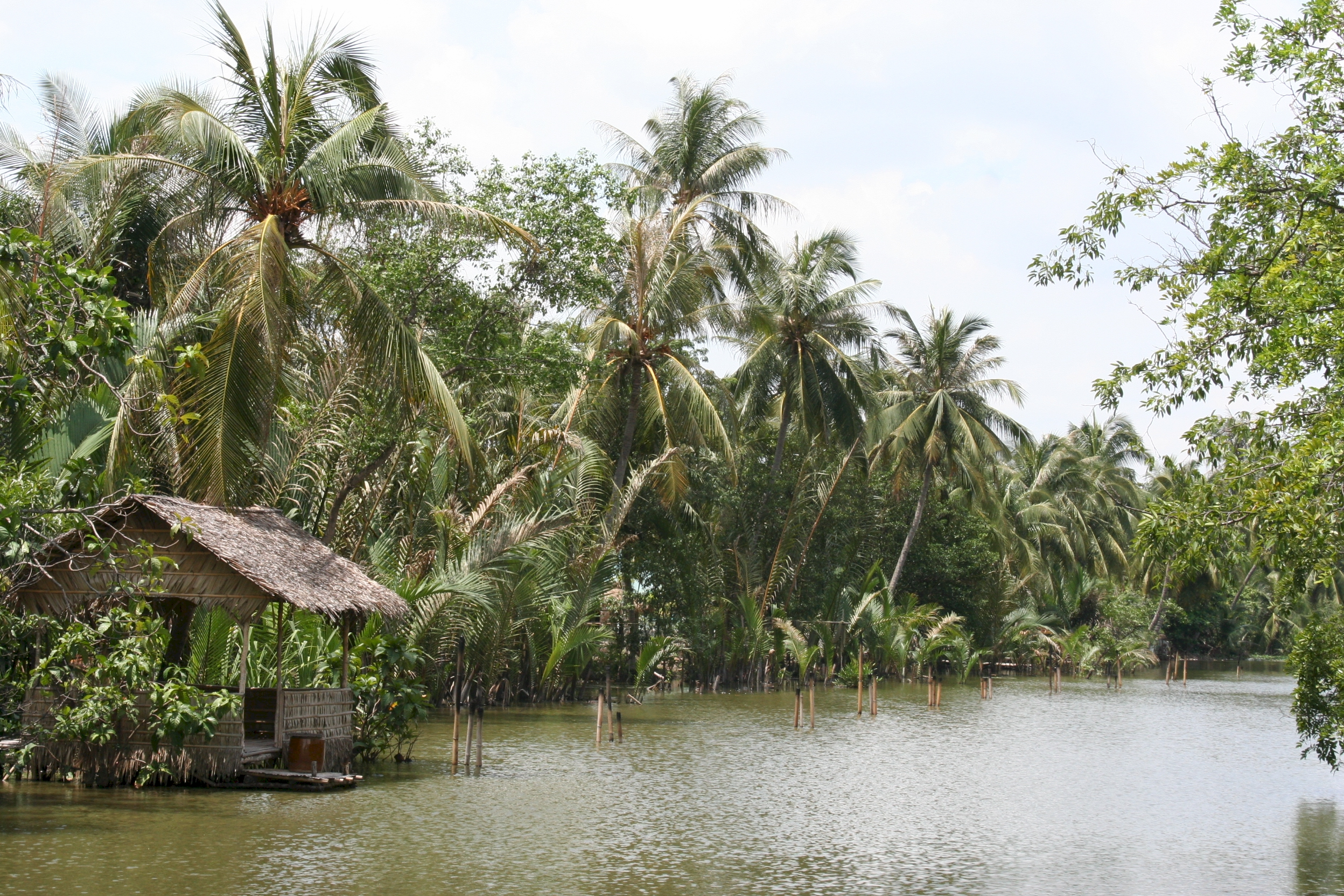

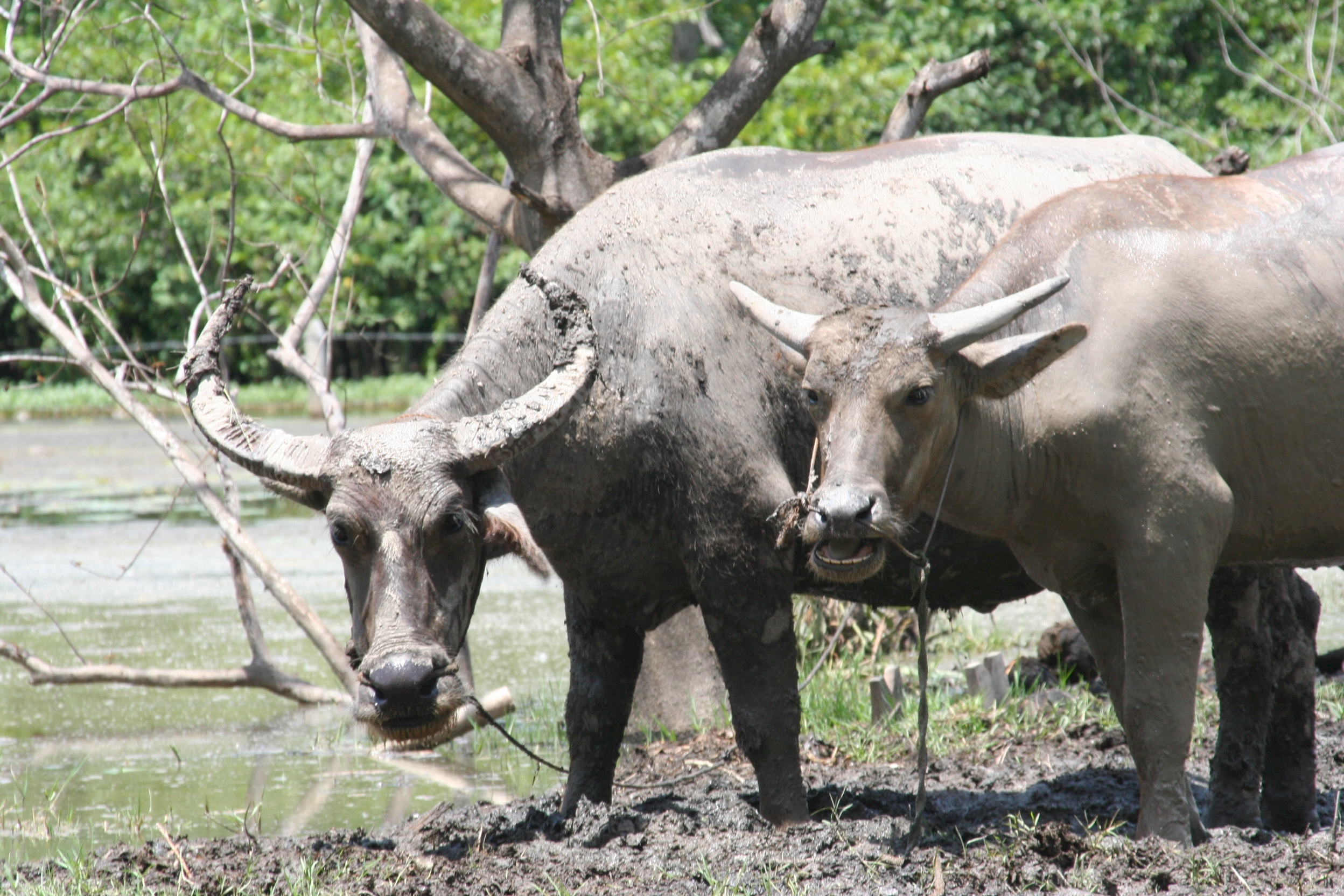

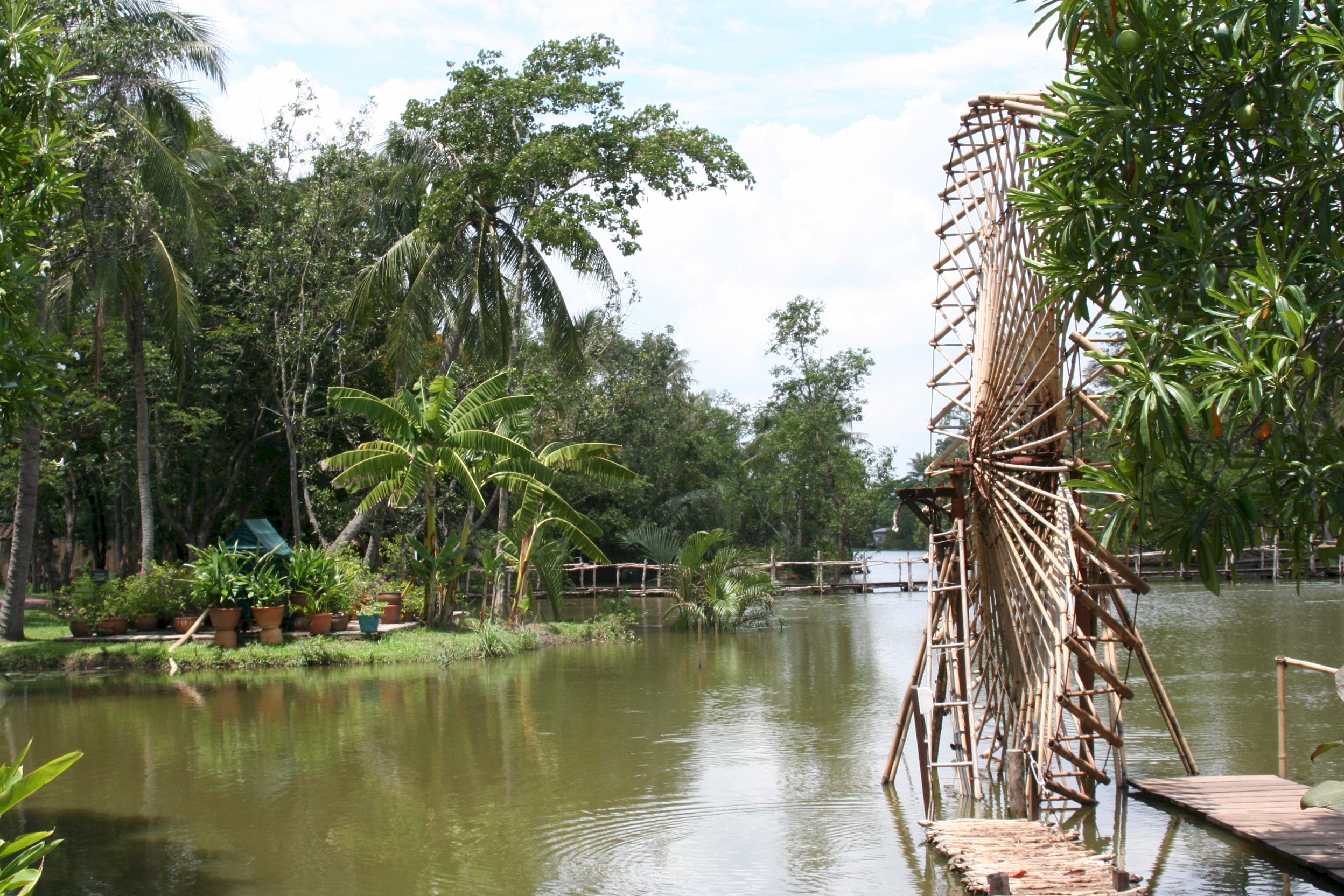

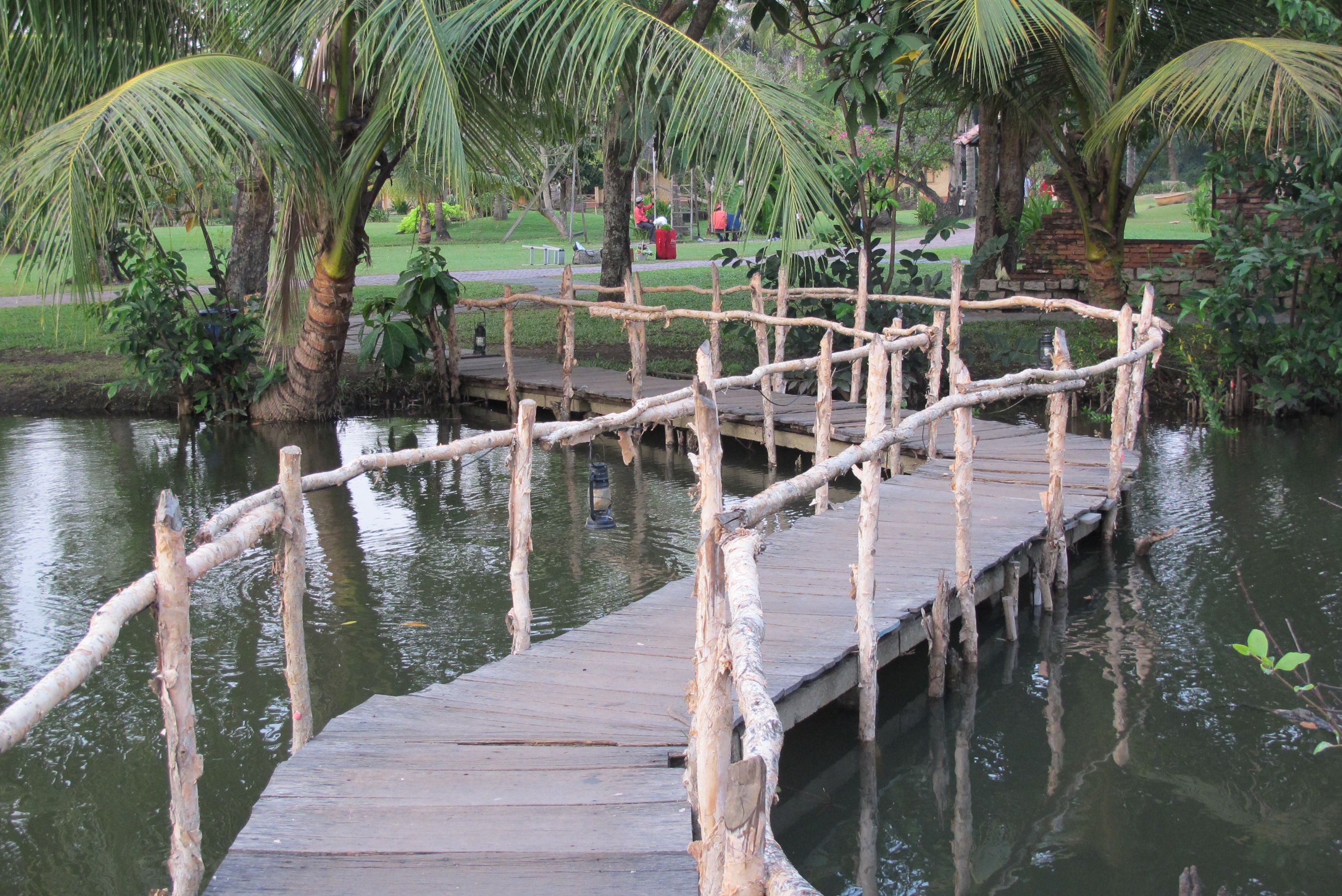

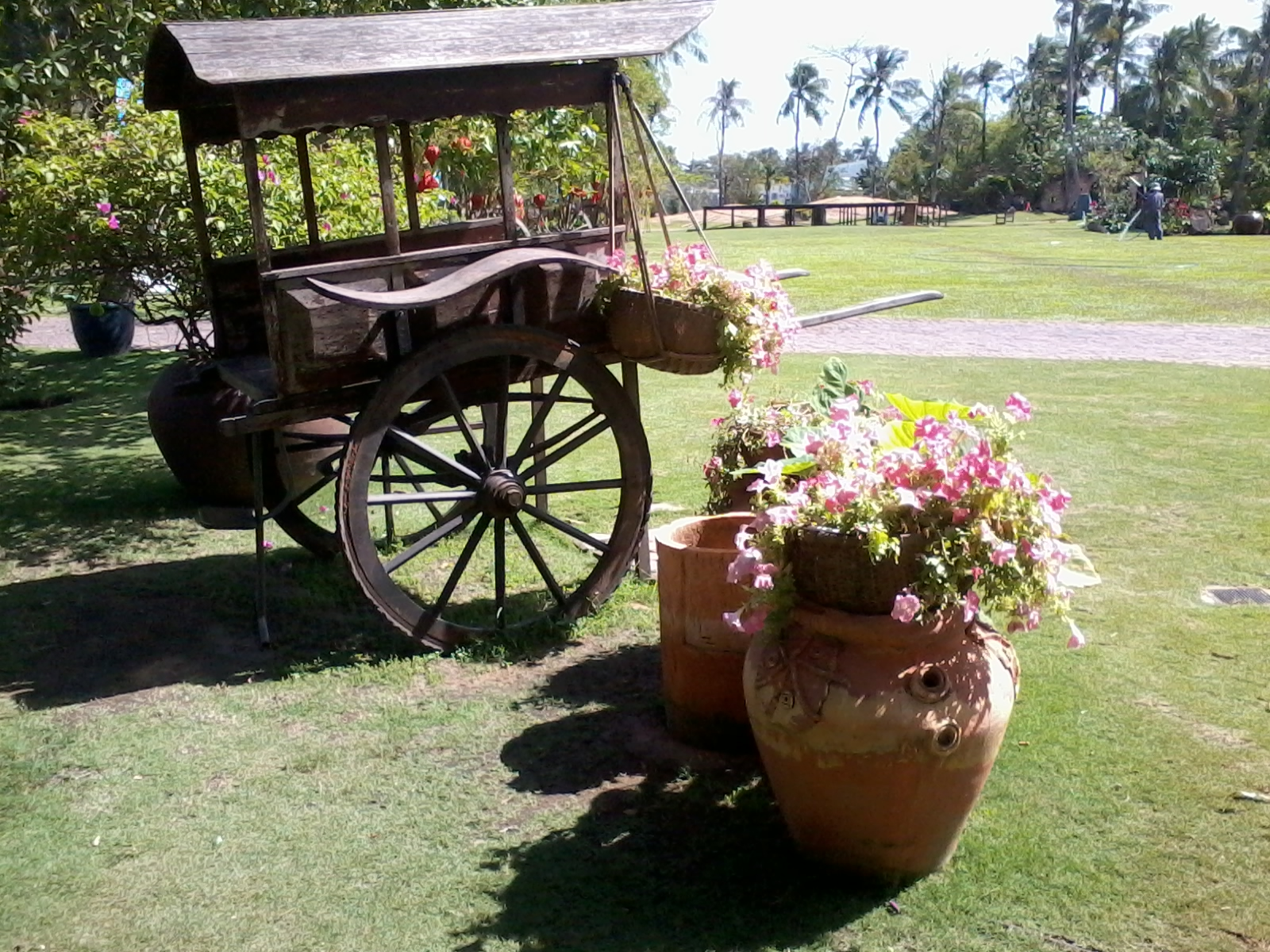
