= Hiệp Bình =

Hiệp Bình Phường Hiệp Bình Bình Phước, Bình Triệu, Bình Chánh, Bình Quới Đông
- Ward
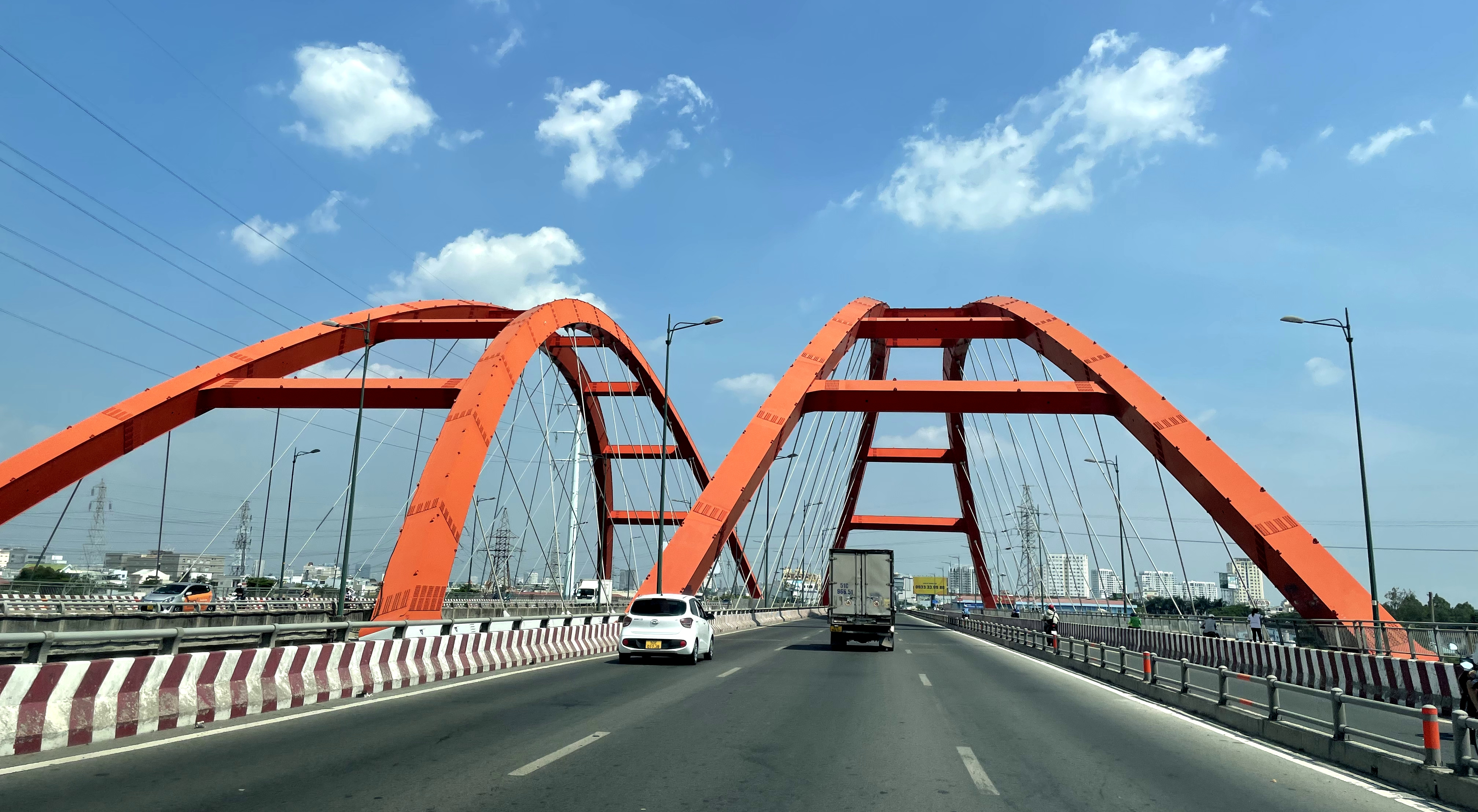
- Hiệp Bình ward viewed from Bình Lợi Bridge
- Interactive map of Hiệp Bình
- Coordinates: 10°51′08″N 106°43′13″E
- Country: Vietnam
- Municipality: Ho Chi Minh City
- Established: June 16, 2025

Area
  - Total: 6.18 sq mi (16.01 km^{2})

Population (2024)
  - Total: 215,638
  - Density: 34,880/sq mi (13,470/km^{2})
- Time zone: UTC+07:00 (Indochina Time)
- Administrative code: 26809

Hiệp Bình (Vietnamese: Phường Hiệp Bình) is a ward of Ho Chi Minh City, Vietnam. It is one of the 168 new wards, communes and special zones of the city following the reorganization in 2025.

== Geography ==
Hiệp Bình ward is about 11 km north of Saigon ward, borders with:

- Bình Hòa by Vĩnh Bình River and Tam Bình to the north
- Thủ Đức by Gò Dưa Canal with Phạm Văn Đồng Boulevard and Linh Xuân by North–South railway to the east
- Bình Quới, Bình Thạnh và Bình Lợi Trung by Saigon River to the south
- An Phú Đông by Saigon River to the west

According to Official Dispatch No. 2896/BNV-CQĐP dated May 27, 2025 of the Ministry of Home Affairs, following the merger, Hiệp Bình has a land area of 16.01 km², the population as of December 31, 2024 is 215,638 people, the population density is 13,468 people/km².

== History ==
On June 16, 2025, the National Assembly Standing Committee issued Resolution No. 1685/NQ-UBTVQH15 on the arrangement of commune-level administrative units of Ho Chi Minh City in 2025 (effective from June 16, 2025). Accordingly, the entire land area and population of Hiệp Bình Chánh, Hiệp Bình Phước wards and part of Linh Đông ward of the former Thủ Đức city will be integrated into a new ward named Hiệp Bình (Clause 67, Article 1).

== Administration ==
Hiệp Bình is divided into 91 neighborhoods, labeled from 1 to 91.
