= Bình Thạnh =

Bình Thạnh may refer to several places in Vietnam:

- Bình Thạnh, Ho Chi Minh City: a ward in the former Bình Thạnh district
- Bình Thạnh district: a former district, dissolved in 2025 as part of the 2025 Vietnamese administrative reform

== See also ==
- Hòa Bình Thạnh commune, Châu Thành, An Giang province
- Bình Thạnh Đông commune, Phú Tân, An Giang province
- Bình Thạnh Trung commune, Lấp Vò district, Đồng Tháp province
