= Thạnh Mỹ Tây, Ho Chi Minh City =

Thạnh Mỹ Tây Phường Thạnh Mỹ Tây Tân Cảng, Văn Thánh, Thị Nghè, Thạnh Đa, Phú Mỹ, Phú An
- Ward
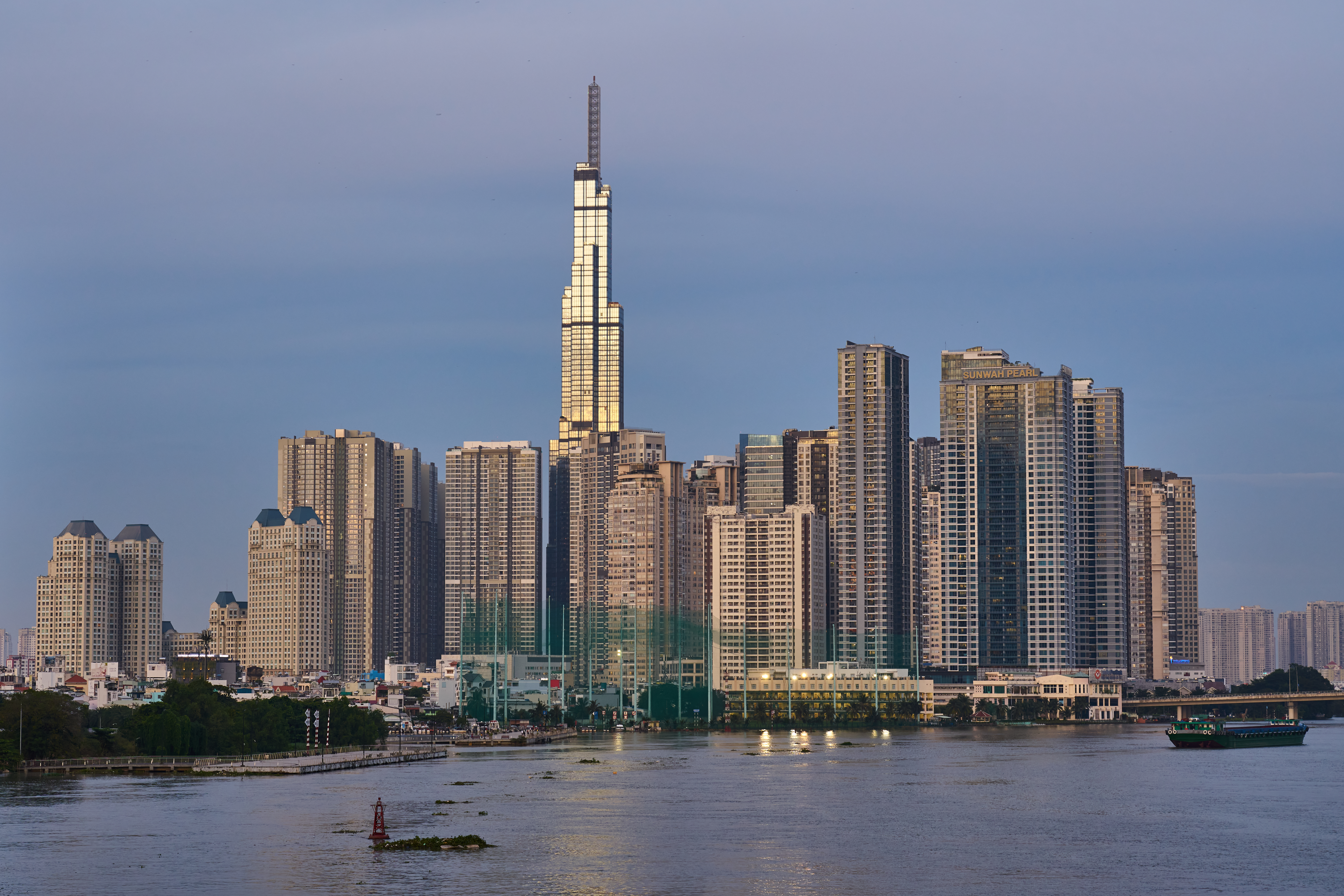
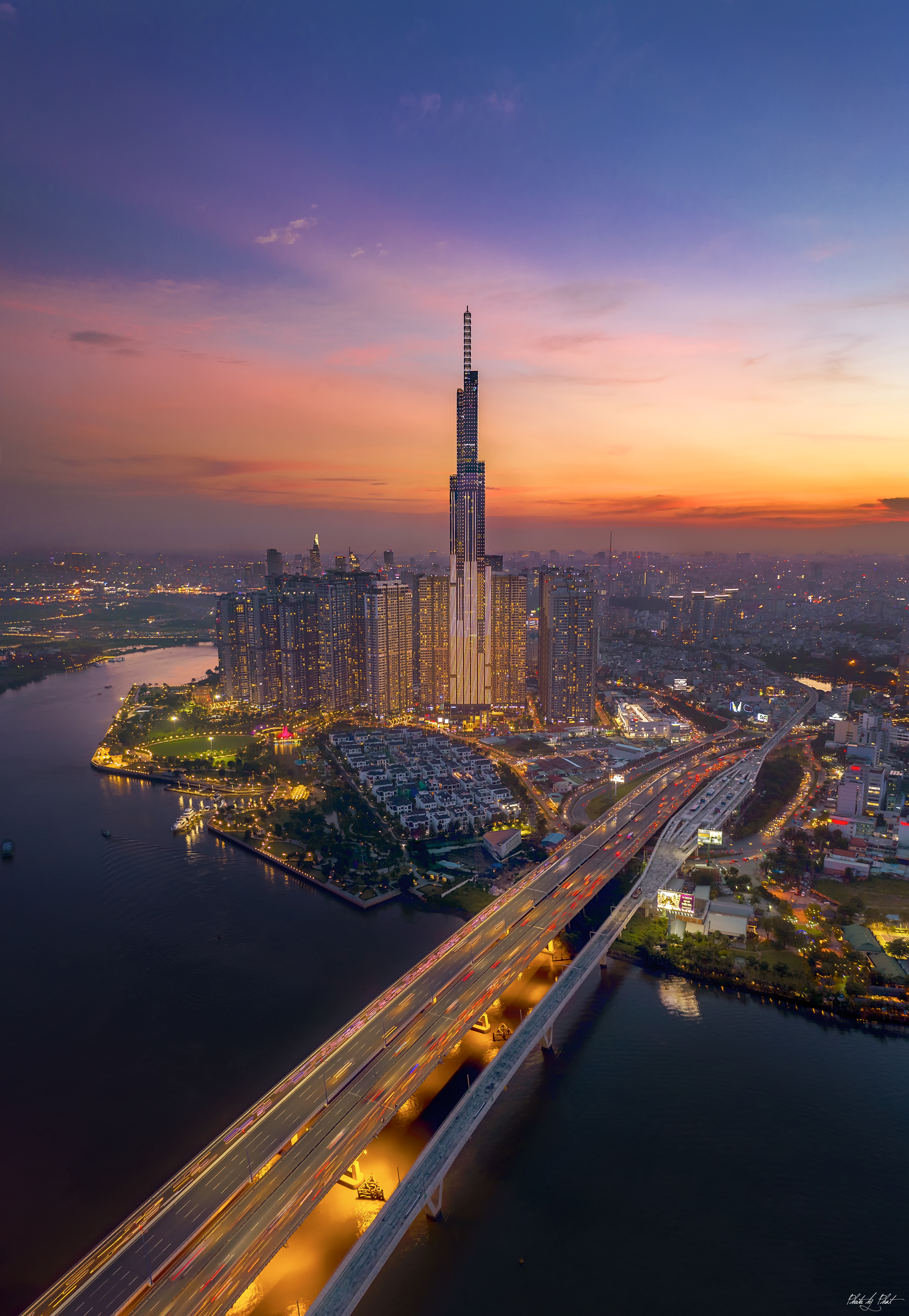
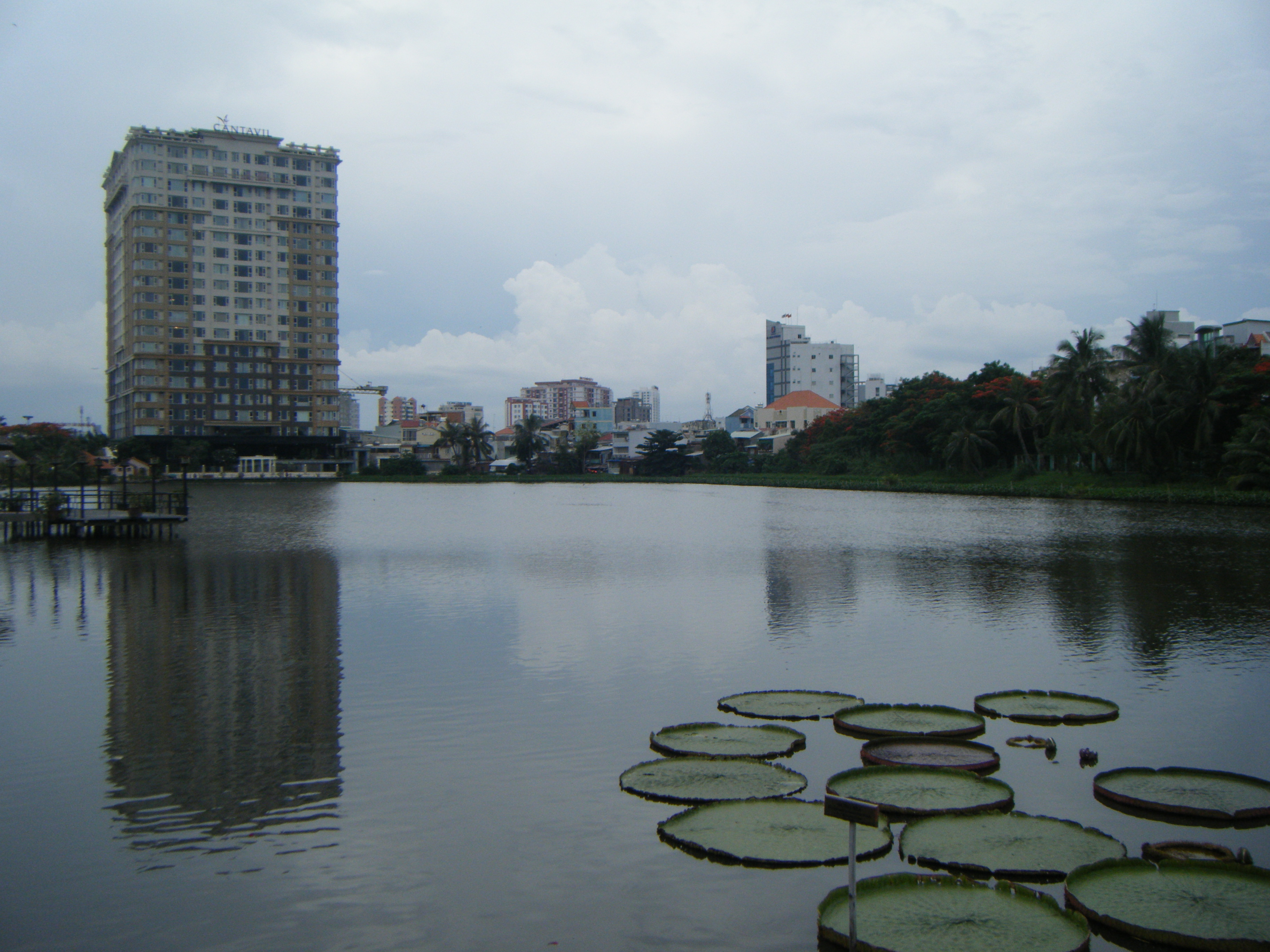
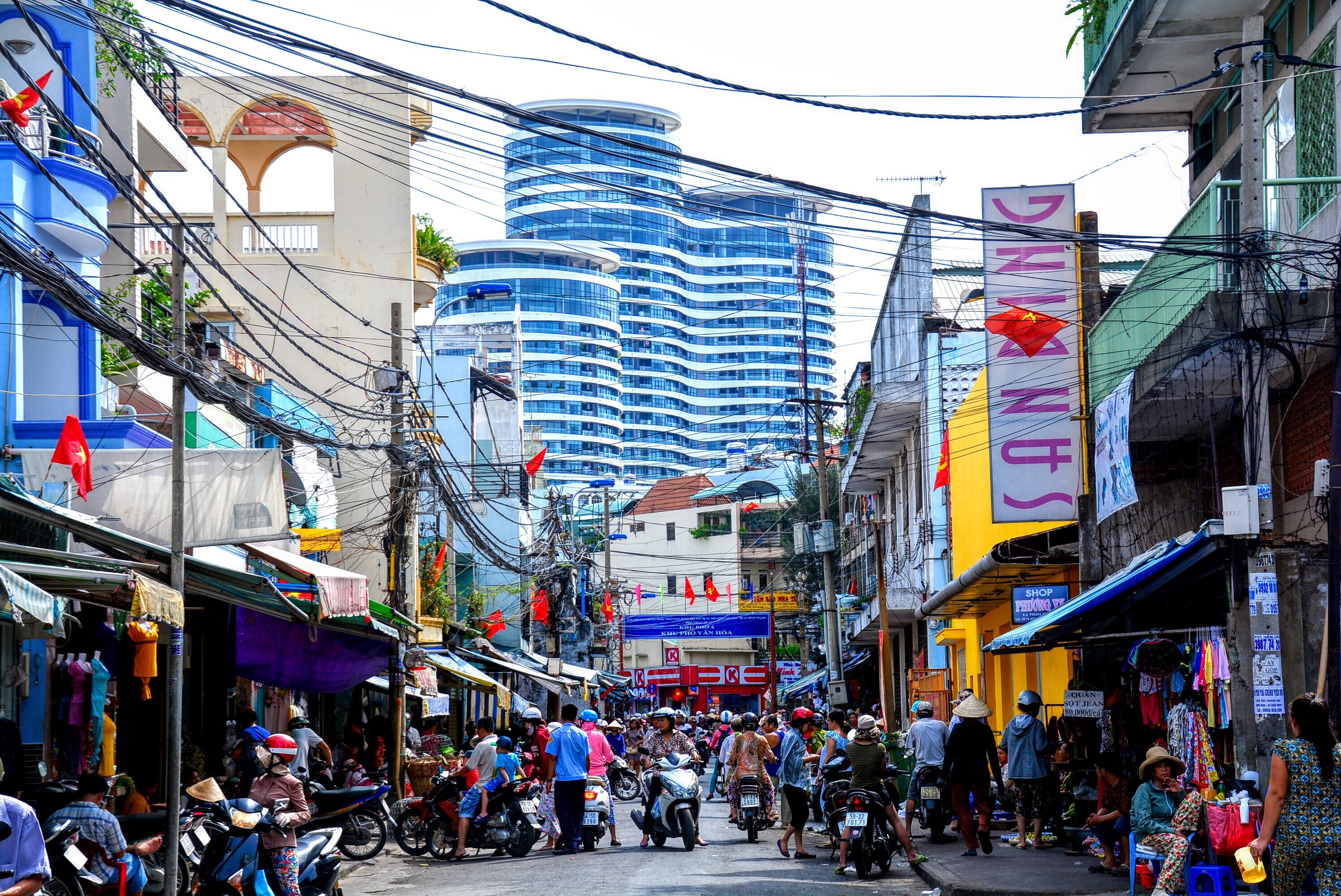
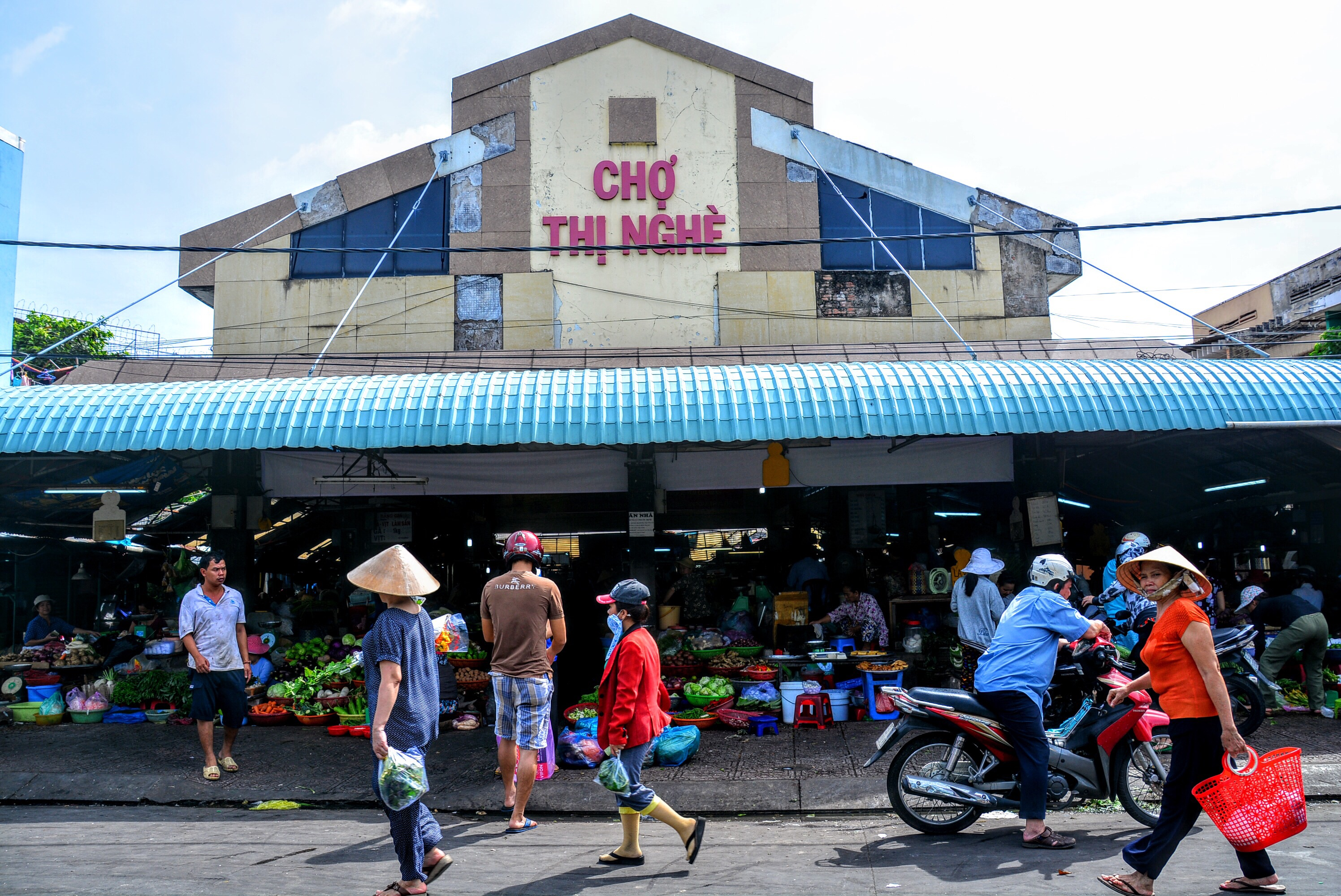
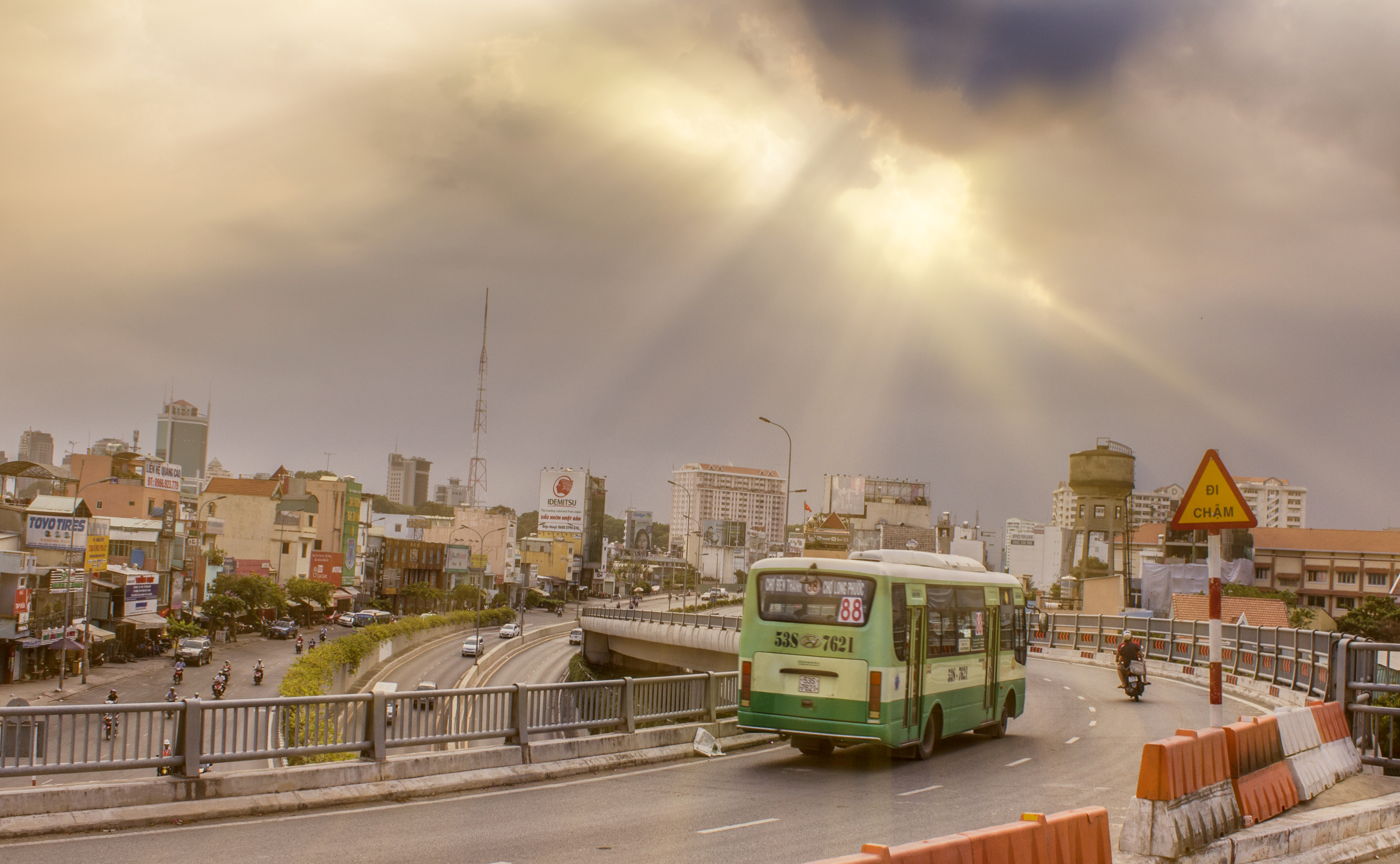
- From left to right: View of Thạnh Mỹ Tây ward from Ba Son Bridge, Saigon Bridge with Tan Cang station, Văn Thánh Park, Thị Nghè quarter with City Garden apartment behind, Thị Nghè Market, Thủ Thiêm Bridge
- Interactive map of Thạnh Mỹ Tây
- Coordinates: 10°47′58″N 106°43′05″E
- Country: Vietnam
- Municipality: Ho Chi Minh City
- Established: June 16, 2025

Area
  - Total: 1.70 sq mi (4.40 km^{2})

Population (2024)
  - Total: 153,216
  - Density: 90,200/sq mi (34,800/km^{2})
- Time zone: UTC+07:00 (Indochina Time)
- Administrative code: 26956

Thạnh Mỹ Tây (Vietnamese: Phường Thạnh Mỹ Tây) is a ward of Ho Chi Minh City, Vietnam. It is one of the 168 new wards, communes and special zones of the city following the reorganization in 2025.

== Geography ==
Thạnh Mỹ Tây is one of the central wards of Ho Chi Minh City, it borders to:

- Bình Quới ward to the North by Thanh Đa Channel
- Saigon ward to the South by Nhiêu Lộc – Thị Nghè Channel
- An Khánh ward to the East by Saigon River
- Bình Thạnh and Gia Định wards to the West by Xô Viết Nghệ Tĩnh Street.

According to Official Dispatch No. 2896/BNV-CQĐP dated May 27, 2025 of the Ministry of Home Affairs, following the merger, Thạnh Mỹ Tây has a land area of 4.40 km², the population as of December 31, 2024 is 153,216 people, the population density is 34,821 people/km².

== Etymology ==
According to Historian Nguyễn Đình Tư, the name Thạnh Mỹ village covered a large area of land on both sides of the Saigon River. Initially, the village belonged to Gò Vấp district, Gia Định province (for a period it belonged to Tân Bình province). Later, when the exploitation expanded, people divided the area on the east bank into Thạnh Mỹ Lợi (in former Thủ Đức) and the remaining area on the west bank was called Thạnh Mỹ Tây (means West Thạnh Mỹ).

However, some government documents from the French Indochina period state that in 1929, Thạnh Đa commune merged with two communes, Phú Mỹ and Phú An, to form Thạnh Mỹ An. In 1934, Thạnh Mỹ An merged with Bình Quới Tây (Bình Quới ward nowadays) to form Thạnh Mỹ Tây commune; or Thạnh Mỹ Tây commune could be the merger of three communes, Thạnh Đa, Bình Lợi Trung, and Bình Quới Tây.

"Thạnh" is an alternative form of "Thịnh" from "phồn thịnh" means prosperous, "Mỹ" means beautiful, the name was given with the wish that this place will always develop prosperously and well.

== History ==
On June 16, 2025, the Standing Committee of the National Assembly issued Resolution No. 1685/NQ-UBTVQH15 on the arrangement of commune-level administrative units of Ho Chi Minh City in 2025. Accordingly, the entire wards of 19, 22 and 25 of Bình Thạnh district will be reorganized into a new ward called Thạnh Mỹ Tây Ward (Clause 45, Article 1).

Some well-known placenames in the ward: Hàng Xanh (or Hàng Sanh), Thị Nghè, Văn Thánh, Tân Cảng (Newport).

== Transportation ==
=== Public transport ===
The ward is planned to have three Ho Chi Minh City Metro lines, including: L1 L3 L5 . With two intechange station are Hàng Xanh station (for Line 3 and Line 5; planned) and Tan Cang station (for Line 1 and Line 5) with two other stations are Van Thanh Park station (for Line 1) and Thị Nghè station (for Line 3; planned).

=== Road ===
The ward main axis roads are:

- Xô Viết Nghệ Tĩnh Street: connecting the western part, Chợ Lớn and Downtown Saigon with the Martyrs 5-way intersection, from that can go to former area Bình Dương and Bình Phước provinces and Central Highlands via National Route 13 ends at Hoa Lư Border Gate or go to Bình Quới and Thủ Đức.
- Điện Biên Phủ Boulevard: connecting the western part of the city and Chợ Lớn with eastern part of the city (Thủ Đức area) and Biên Hòa via Hanoi Highway
- Nguyễn Hữu Cảnh Boulevard: connecting downtown with the ward at Saigon Bridge junction

== Education ==
=== Universities and colleges ===
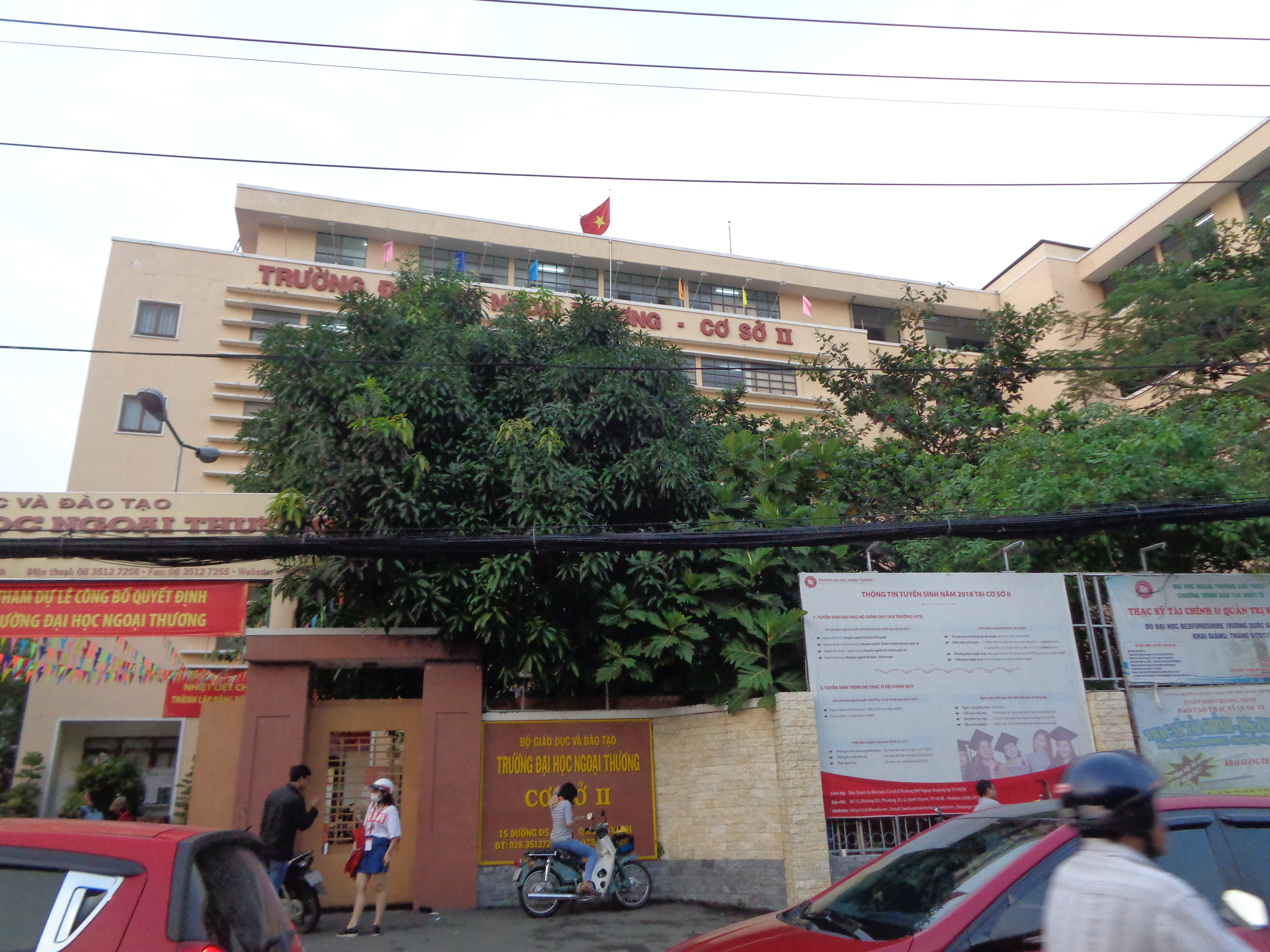
Foreign Trade University, Ho Chi Minh City Branch on D5 Street

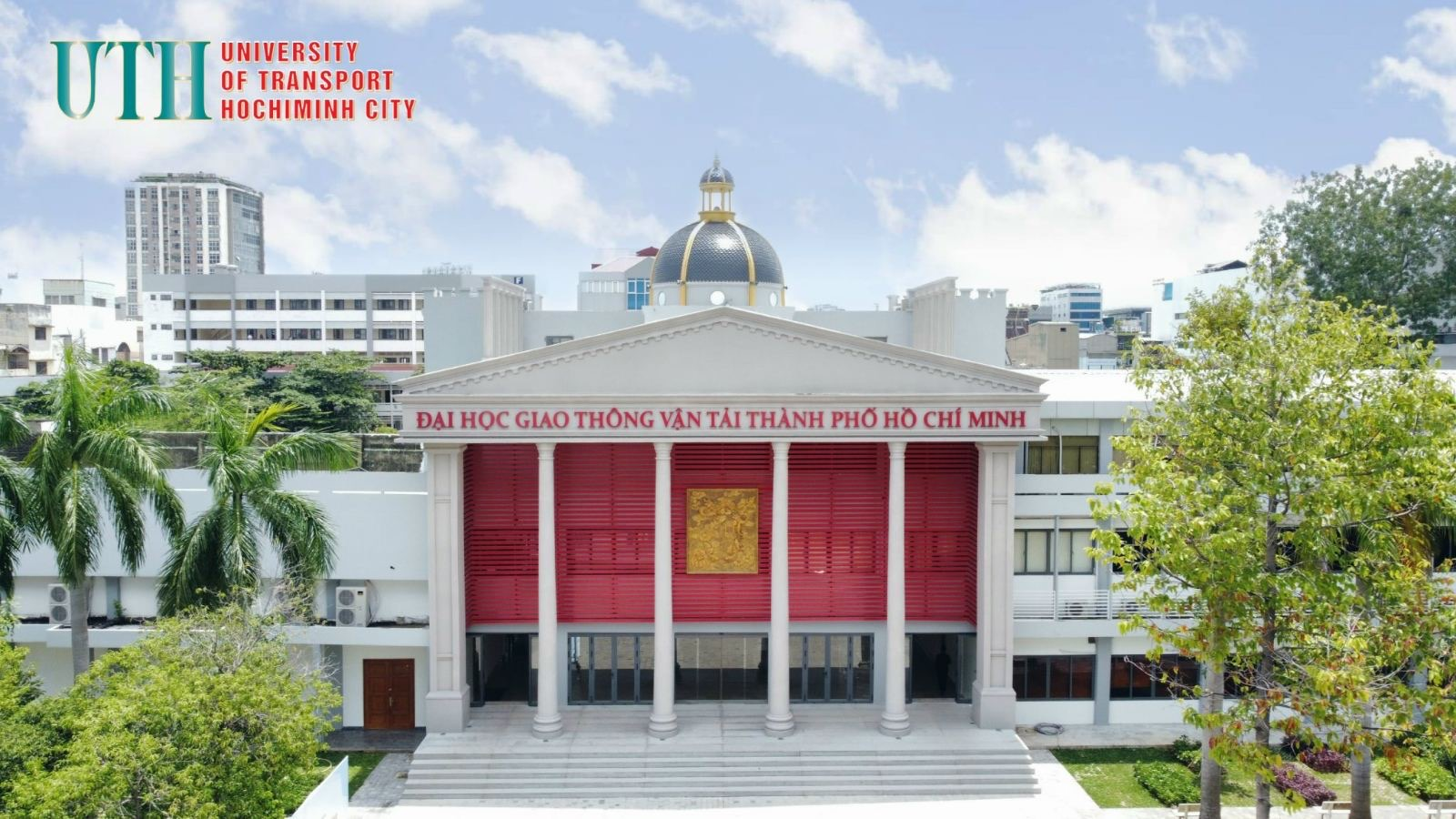
Ho Chi Minh University of Transports

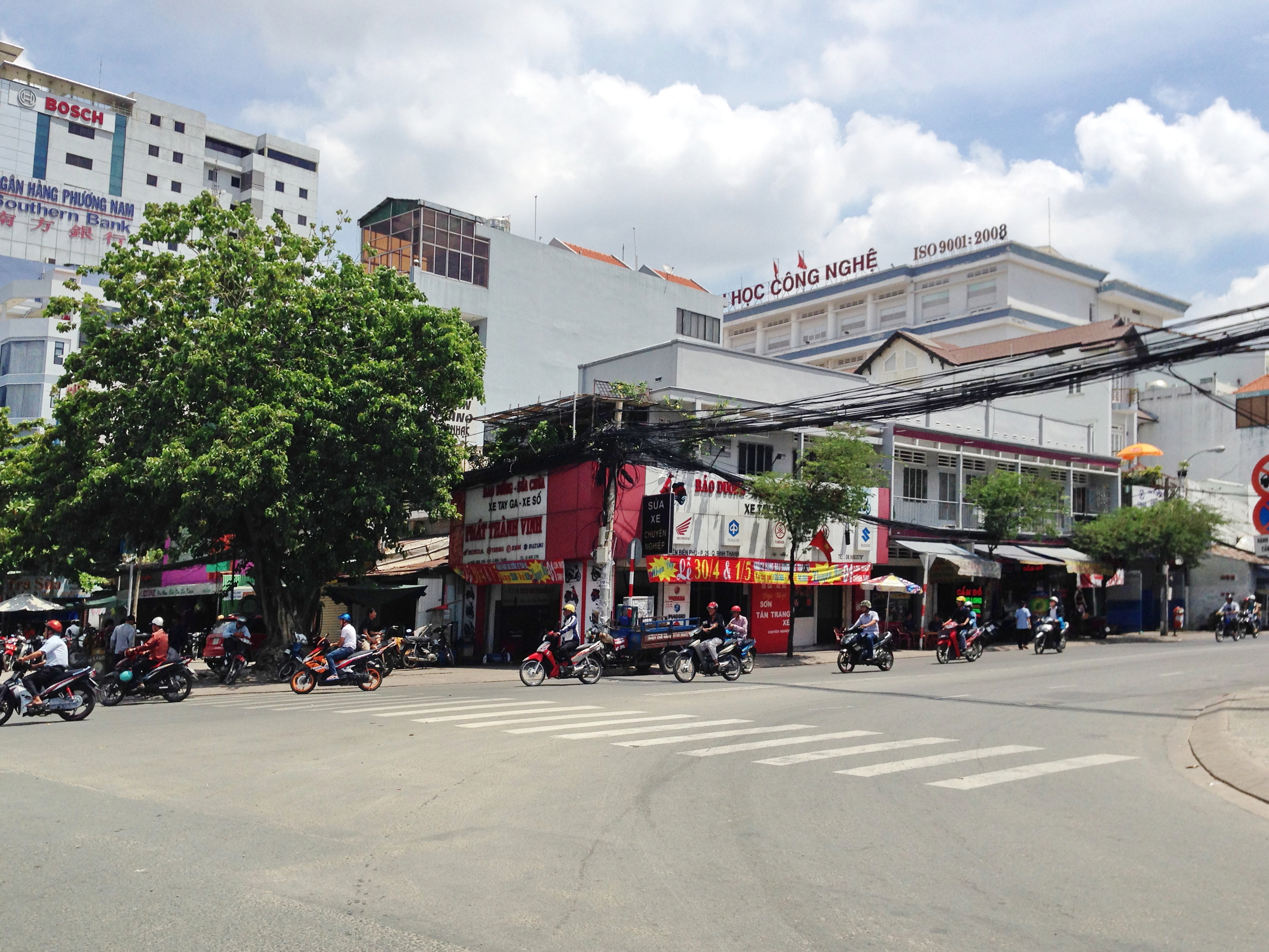
HUTECH Campus A

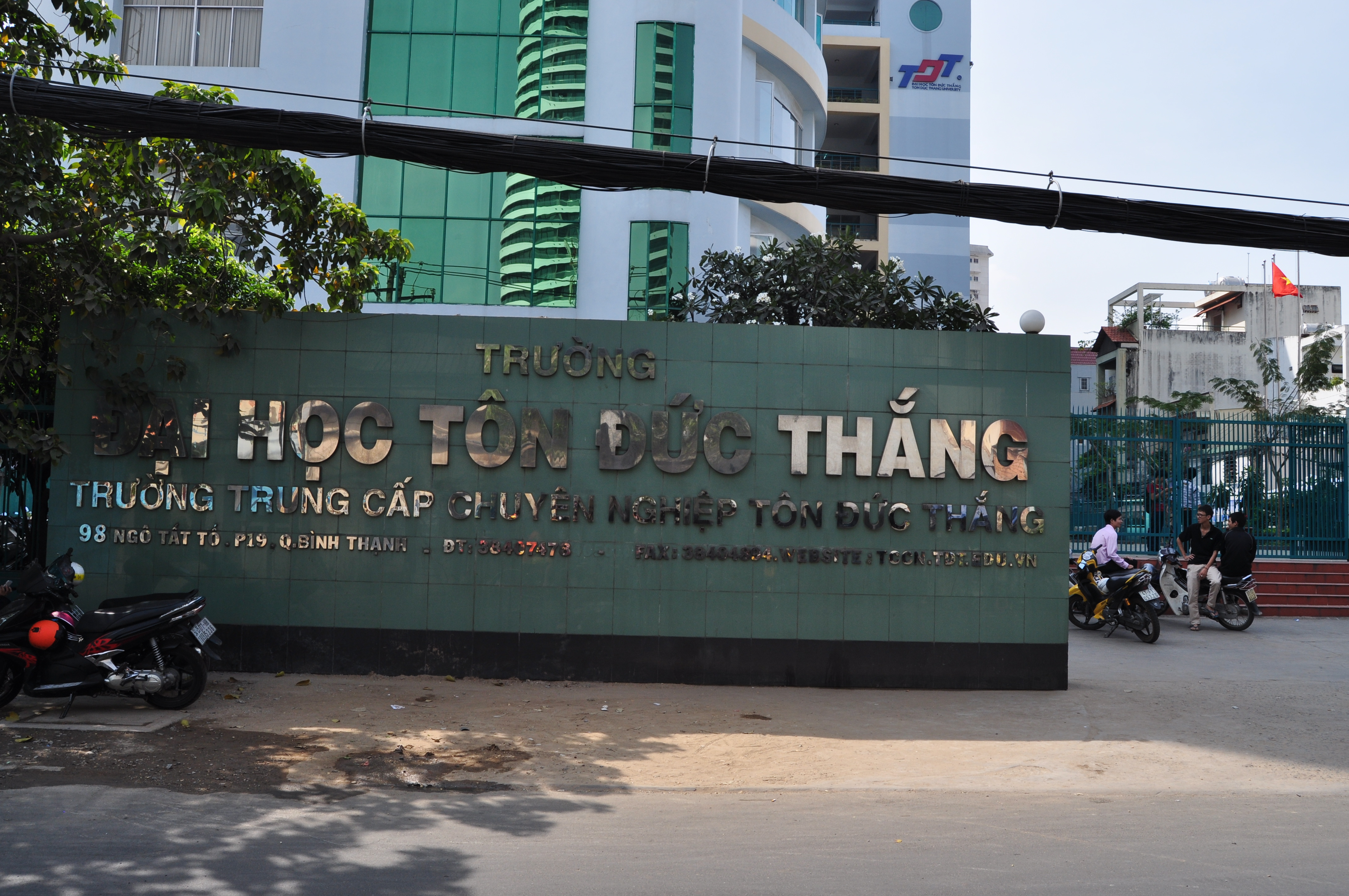
Tôn Đức Thắng University, 98 Ngô Tất Tố Campus
- Foreign Trade University, Ho Chi Minh City Branch (also known as FTU2 or Branch II)
- Ho Chi Minh City University of Transport (UTH) – Main Campus
- Ho Chi Minh City University of Technology (HUTECH; private university) – Saigon Campus
- Tôn Đức Thắng University (TDTU) – 98 Ngô Tất Tố Campus
- Pasteur College of Medicine and Pharmacy

=== Schools ===
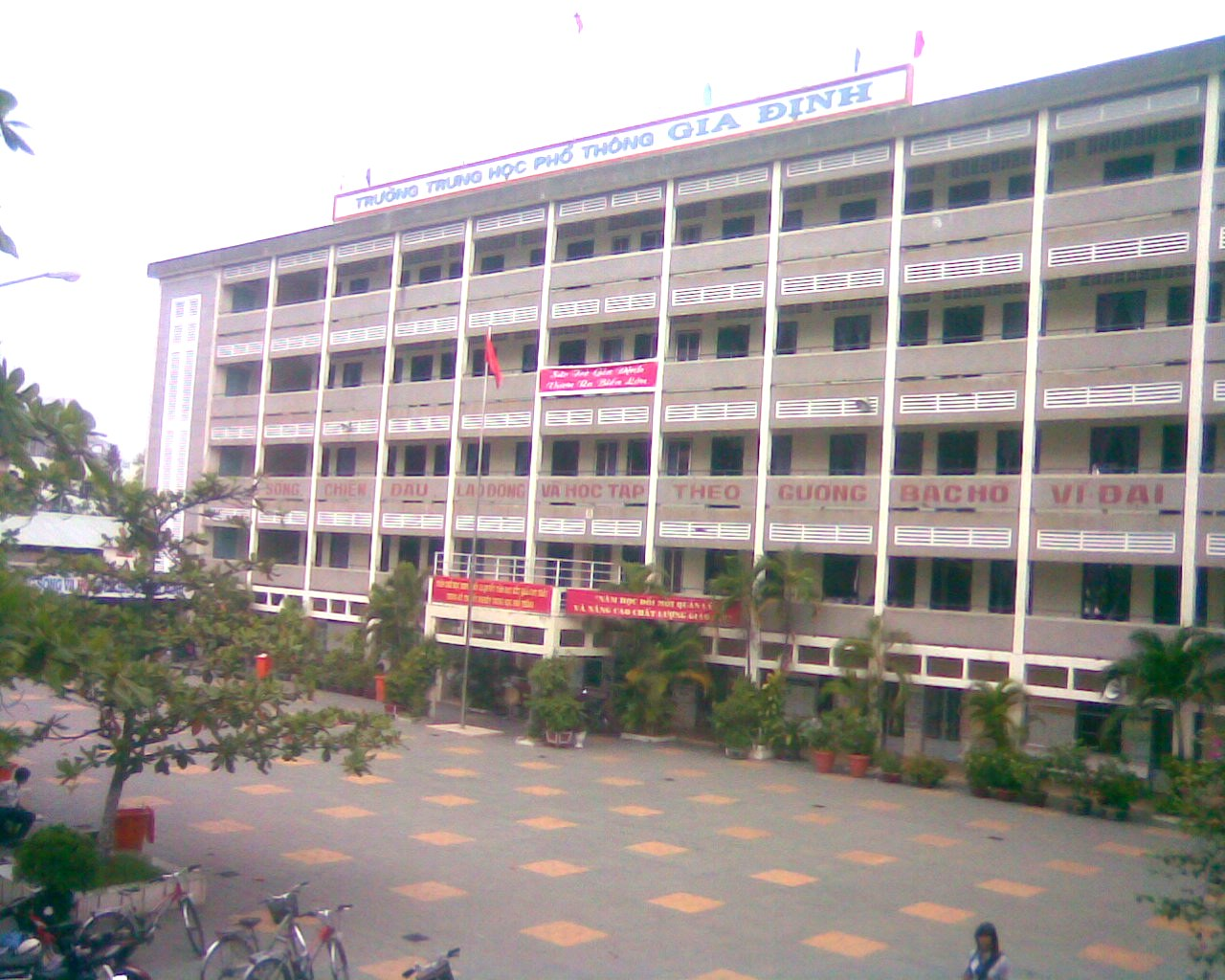
Block A, Gia Định High School

- Gia Định High School (originally known as Nguyễn Duy Khang Private School, then Lạc Hồng High School and Thạnh Mỹ Tây High School)
- Phú Mỹ Secondary School
- Thạnh Mỹ Tây Primary School
- American International School, Saigon – Văn Thánh Campus

== Notable buildings ==
Thạnh Mỹ Tây ward is a place with a top-most high density of high-rise buildings in the city, mostly on two main boulevards of Điện Biên Phủ and Nguyễn Hữu Cảnh.

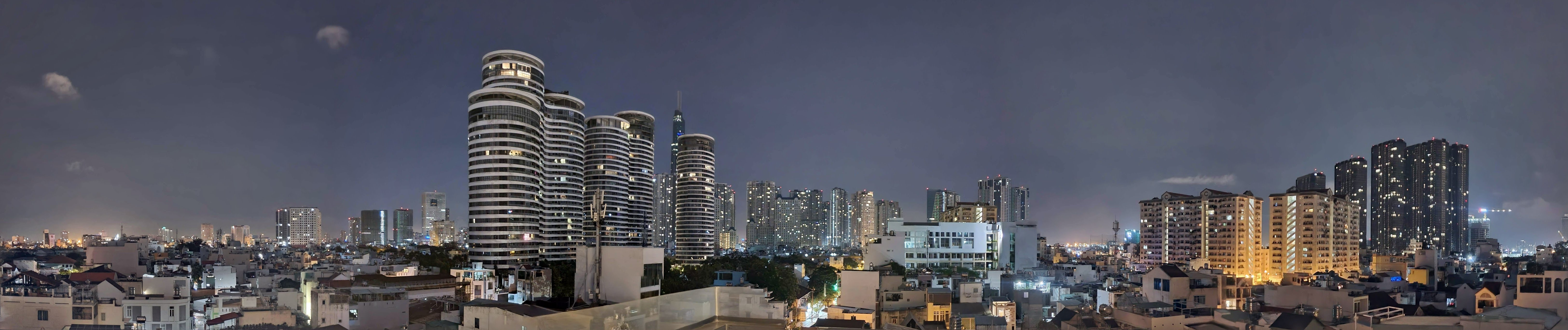
A panorama view of Thạnh Mỹ Tây ward skyline

List of some notable buildings in the ward:

- Landmark 81
- Saigon Pearl Condominiums
- Sunwah Pearl
- Opal Tower
- City Garden Apartment
- Pearl Plaza
- CII Tower
- AP Tower
- Bitexco The Manor Ho Chi Minh
- Phạm Viết Chánh Apartment
- Ngô Tất Tố Apartment
- Nguyễn Ngọc Phương Apartment

== Gallery ==
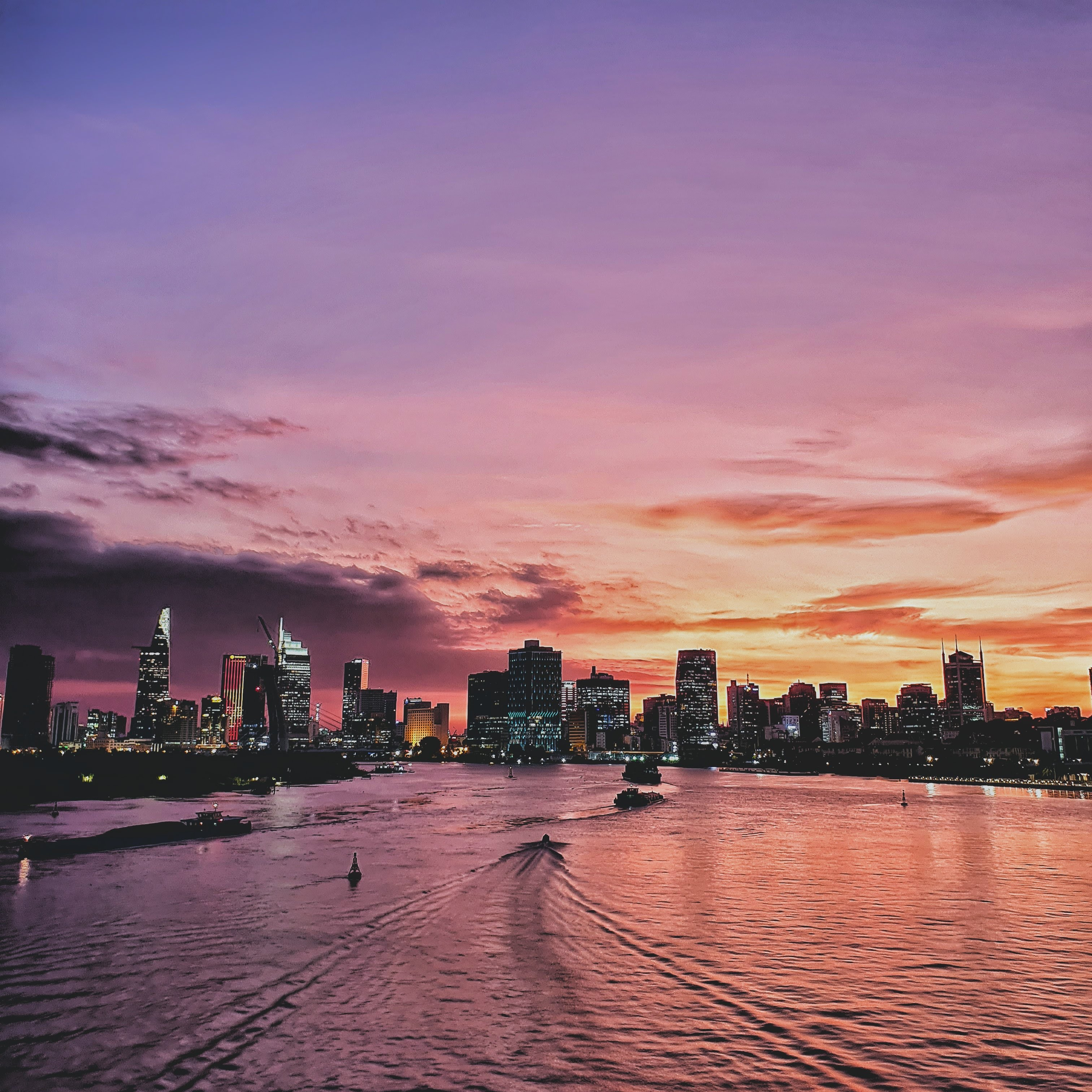
Dawn view from Thủ Thiêm Bridge

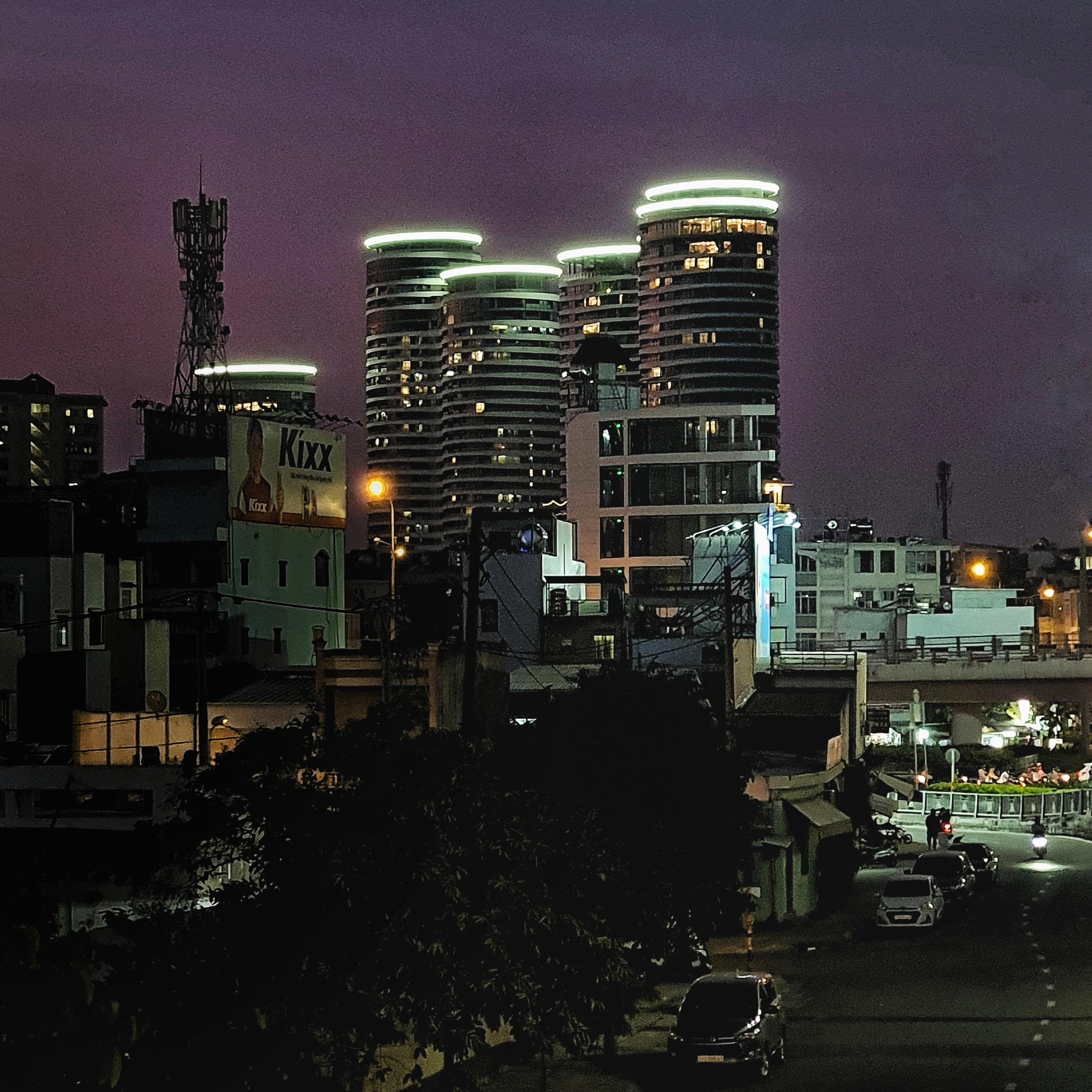
City Garden on Ngô Tất Tố Street
