= Thị Nghè =

Thị Nghè Bà Nghè
- Neighborhood
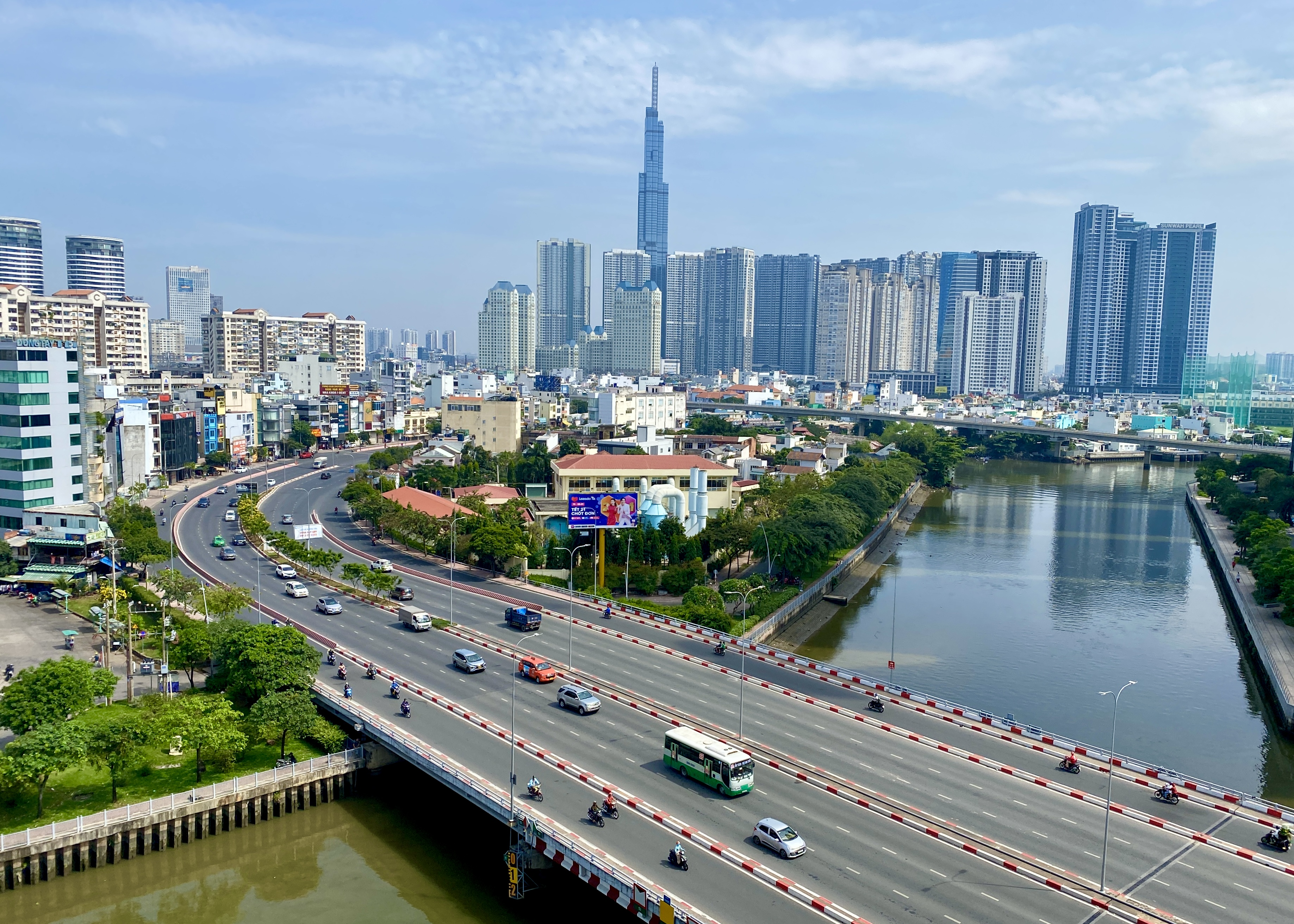
- Thị Nghè 2 Bridge on Nguyễn Hữu Cảnh Boulevard
- Country: Vietnam
- City: Ho Chi Minh City
- Ward: Thạnh Mỹ Tây
- First settled: 1748
- Named for: Nguyễn Thị Khánh
- Postal code: 72355

Thị Nghè ( 氏儀) is a placename in Thạnh Mỹ Tây, Ho Chi Minh City, Vietnam.

== Location ==
The Thị Nghè area does not have clearly defined boundaries, but it was first generally defined as being enclosed within Điện Biên Phủ Boulevard (from the bridge of the same name to Saigon Bridge) to the west and north, and bordered by the Saigon River and the creek of the same name to the east and south, respectively. Administratively, mostly of it is in Thạnh Mỹ Tây ward and a small area in the west is in Gia Định.

Its core area is a peninsula-alike adjacent Thị Nghè and Văn Thánh creeks, as well as both sides of Xô Viết Nghệ Tĩnh Street (from Thị Nghè Bridge to Hàng Xanh intersection), entirely in Thạnh Mỹ Tây. Today, the Thị Nghè area is generally understood to be located within this core area.

== History ==
=== Etymology ===
Thị Nghè is the colloquial name of Mrs. Nguyễn Thị Khánh, daughter of the Imperial Commissioner Nguyễn Cửu Vân, and wife of an anonymous secretary. It was written Gia Định Thành Thông Chí by Trịnh Hoài Đức:

"...(bà) có chồng là thư ký mỗ, nên người đương thời gọi là Bà Nghè mà không xưng tên. Sở dĩ có tên ấy là do khi đầu bà khai hoang đất ở, bắc cầu ngang qua để tiện việc đi lại, nên dân gọi là cầu Bà Nghè, cũng gọi sông ấy là sông Bà Nghè"

— Trịnh Hoài Đức, Gia Định Thành Thông Chí, "Trấn Phiên An" section

The name of this area originates from the fact that Mrs. Nghè (Bà Nghè, i.e Nguyễn Thị Khánh) was the first person to reclaim the land and build a market in this area, and also built a bridge to facilitate crossing between the two banks of the river. The market, the bridge, and the river were later referred to by the locals as Bà Nghè. Later, the locals changed Bà Nghè to Thị Nghè (the meaning of the name remained unchanged, but the more formal title "Bà" was replaced with "Thị", a more informal and general title for women in Vietnamese).
