= Bình Quới Tourist Village =

Coordinates: 10.833°N 106.742°E

Bình Quới Tourist Village (Vietnamese: Làng du lịch Bình Quới) is a resort and tourist attraction in Bình Quới (Bình Thạnh District), Ho Chi Minh City.

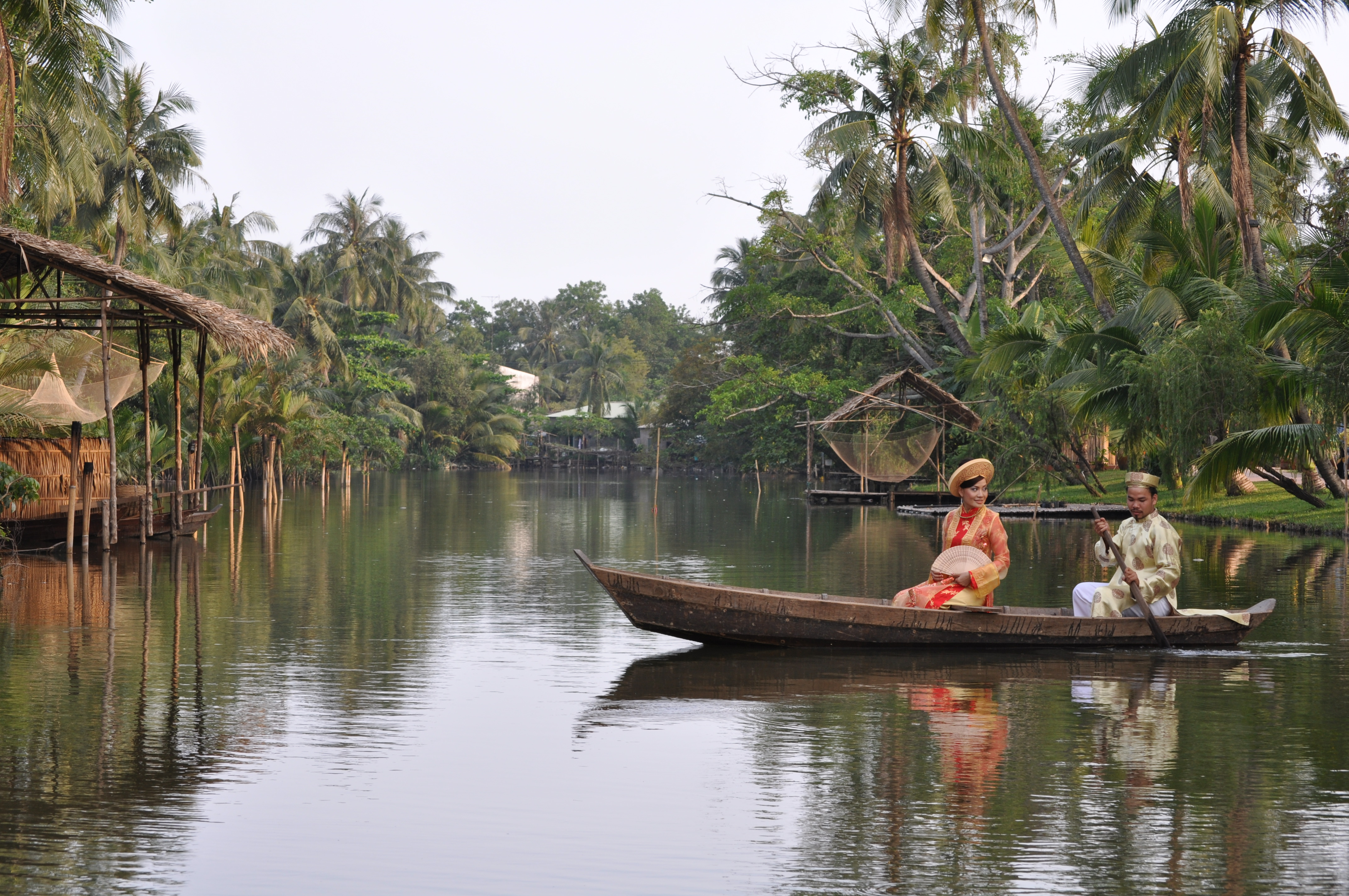
Bình Quới

The Tourist Village comprises the two parts of the Bình Quới Tourist Area. The Bình Quới Tourist Area I and Bình Quới Tourist Area II. The Tourist Village is located on the Bình Quới – Thanh Đa Peninsula on the Saigon River approximately 8 km (a 20-to-30-minute drive depending on traffic) from the city center.

Location of Bình Quới Tourist Village in Ho Chi Minh City

The Tourist Village is set on lush garden-like grounds with lawns, coconut trees, creeks, and thatched cottages, presenting a view of days gone by in Vietnam's Mekong Delta region. Rich traditional southern Vietnamese cuisine is served there, and the area features a three-level, 700-seat floating restaurant in Bạch Đằng Quay.

Entertainment includes a cultural show featuring a traditional Vietnamese wedding, complete with water-borne bridal procession, rituals, and dances.

== History ==
The Tourist Village comprises the two parts of the Bình Quới Tourist Area. The Bình Quới Tourist Area I was established by the Vietnamese government in 1975 and 1976, while the Bình Quới Tourist Area II was built from 1979 to 1980, and the Tourist Village was established in 1994.

In 2004, the village underwent a significant expansion costing 60 billion VND (approximately $3.8 million USD at the time), increasing its area from 3.5 hectares to 8.6 hectares. This included new culinary facilities and traditional architecture to enhance its appeal as a cultural hub. Over the years, it has hosted large-scale cultural festivals and adapted to urban challenges, such as reopening after COVID-19 restrictions in 2021 alongside other sites like Đầm Sen Cultural Park.
