= Bình Thạnh, Ho Chi Minh City =

Bình Thạnh Phường Bình Thạnh Bình Hòa
- Ward
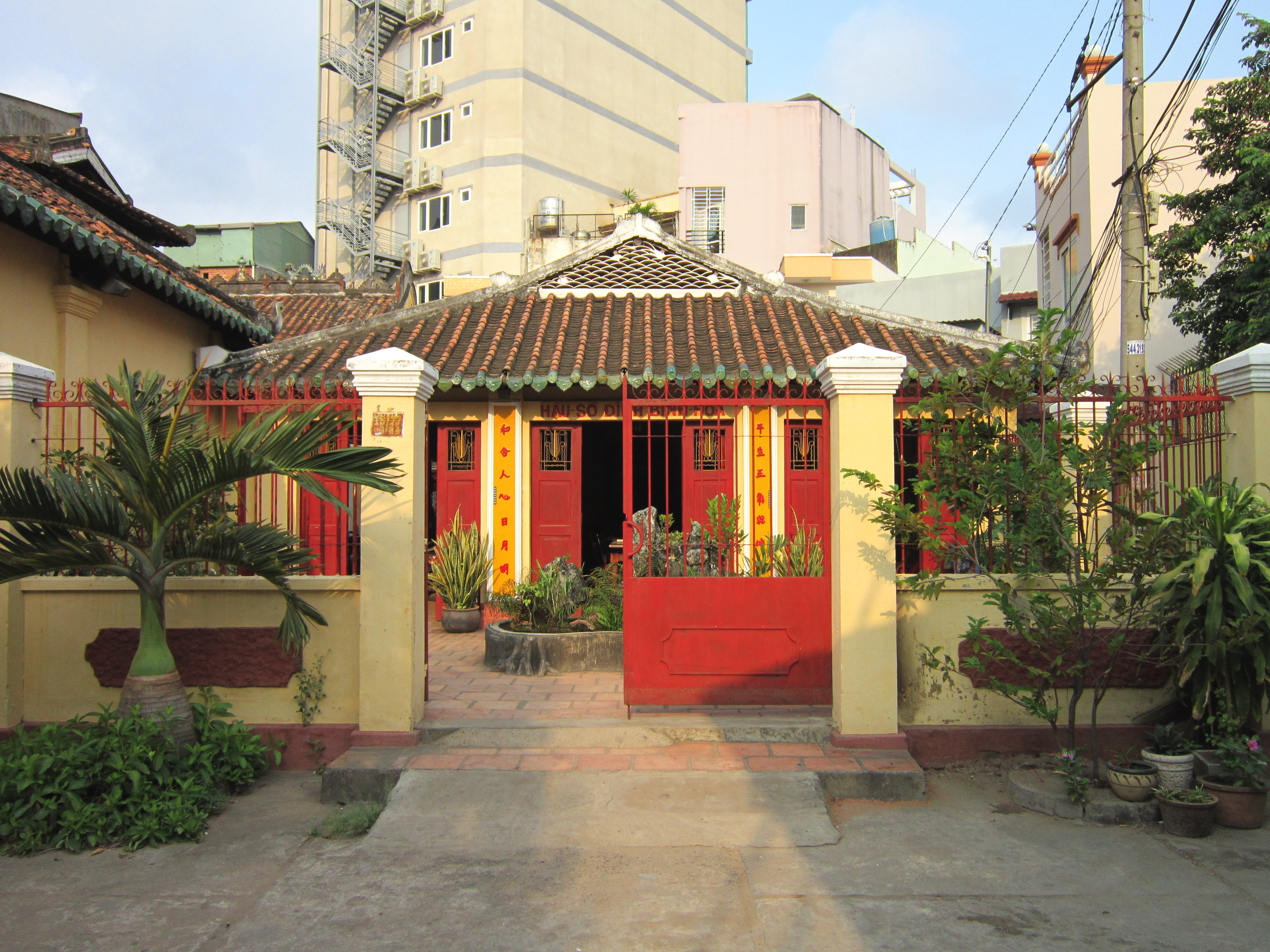
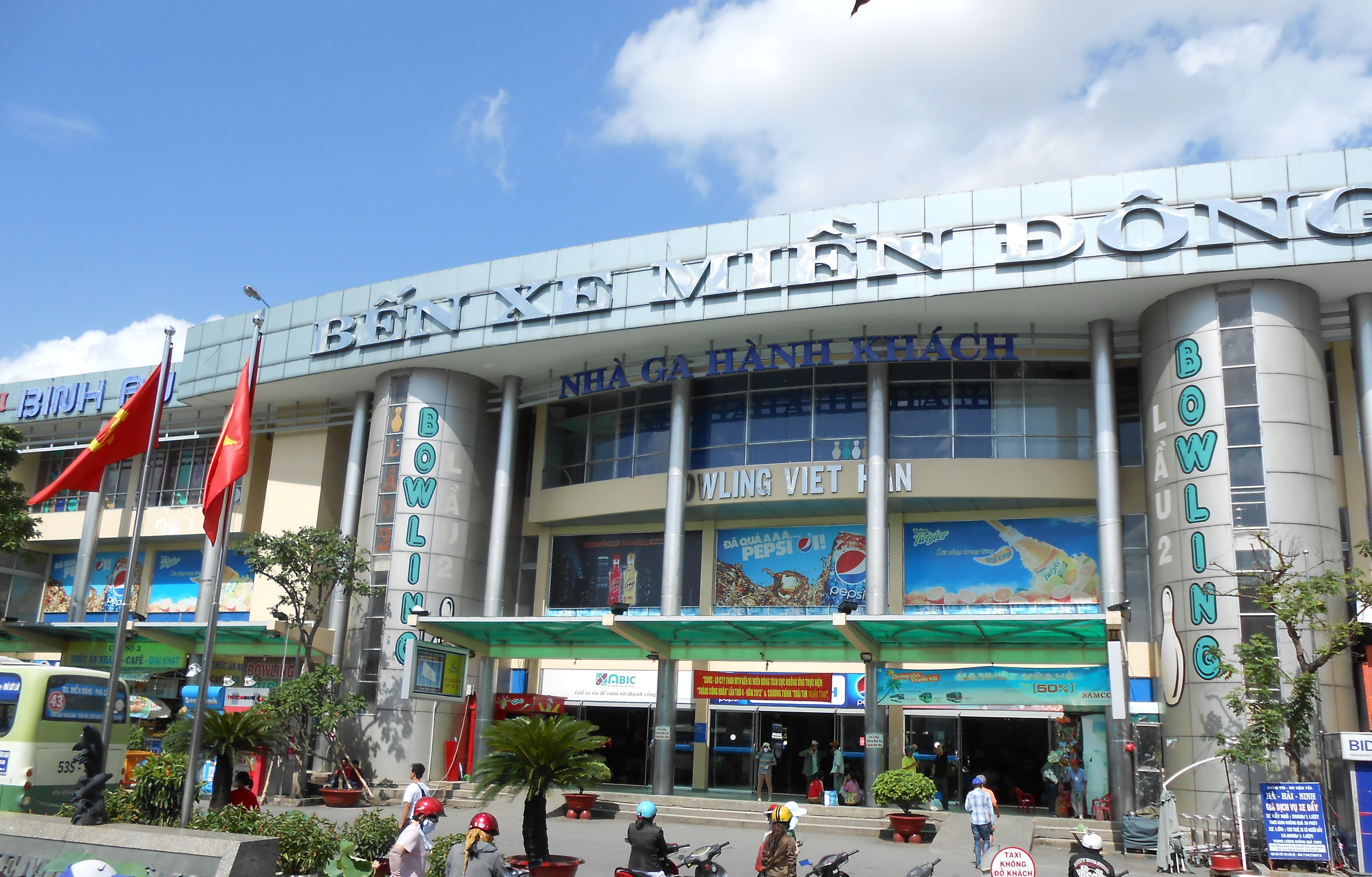
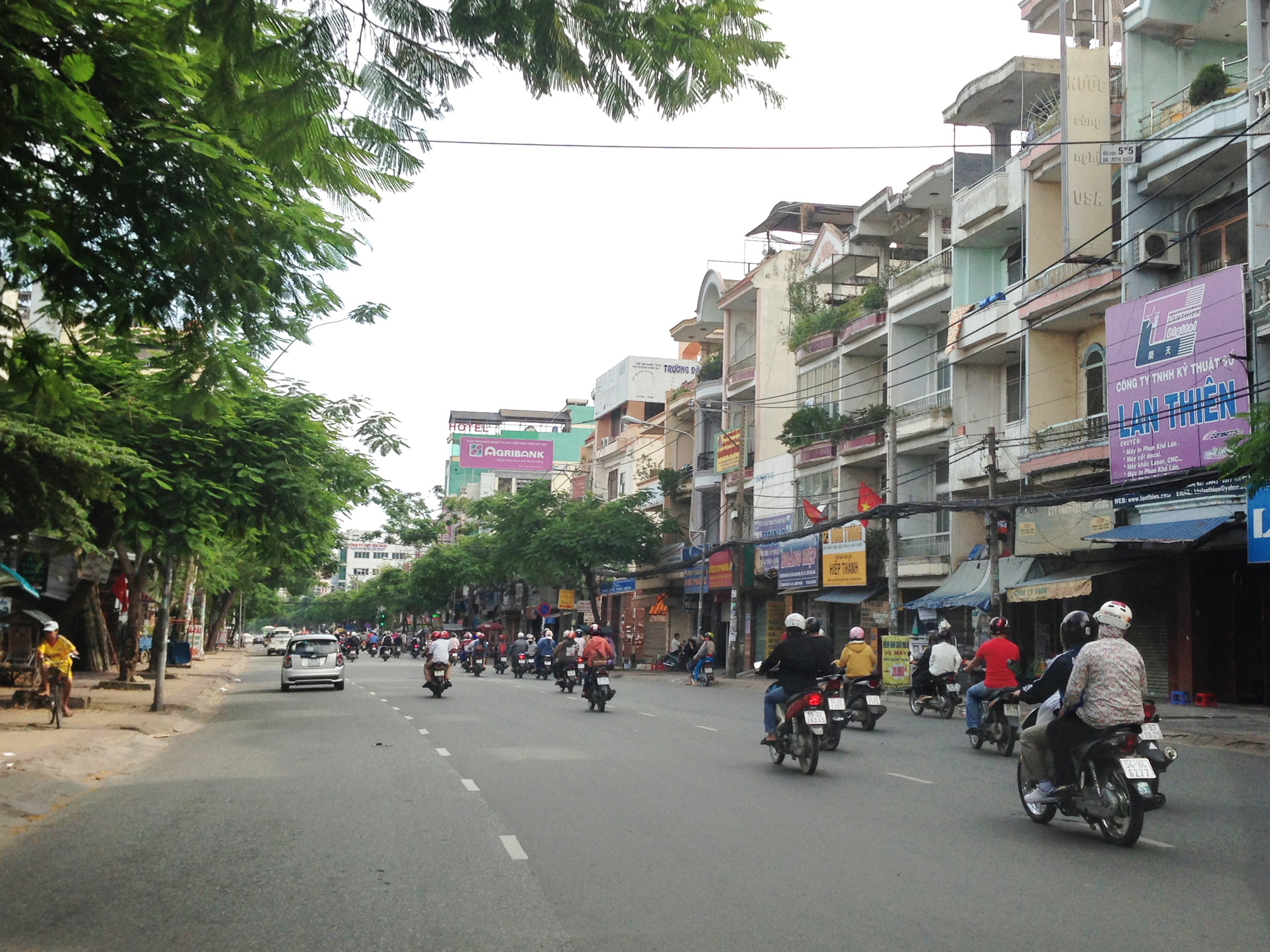
- Bình Hòa Communal House, Eastern Bus Terminus and Đinh Bộ Lĩnh Road
- Interactive map of Bình Thạnh
- Coordinates: 10°48′20″N 106°41′46″E
- Country: Vietnam
- Municipality: Ho Chi Minh City
- Established: June 16, 2025

Area
  - Total: 1.28 sq mi (3.32 km^{2})

Population (2024)
  - Total: 126,300
  - Density: 98,500/sq mi (38,000/km^{2})
- Time zone: UTC+07:00 (Indochina Time)
- Administrative code: 26929

Bình Thạnh (Vietnamese: Phường Bình Thạnh) is a ward of Ho Chi Minh City, Vietnam. It is one of the 168 new wards, communes and special zones of the city following the reorganization in 2025.

== Geography ==
Bình Thạnh is located in the north of central Ho Chi Minh City, 3 km (1.9 mi) away from Saigon, it adjacent with:

- Bình Quới ward to the Northeast by Thanh Đa Canal
- Gia Định ward to the South by Bạch Đằng Boulevard
- Thạnh Mỹ Tây ward to the East by Xô Viết Nghệ Tĩnh Street
- Bình Lợi Trung wards to the West by Nơ Trang Long – Phan Văn Trị Street and to the North by Xuyên Tâm Canal.

According to Official Dispatch No. 2896/BNV-CQĐP dated May 27, 2025 of the Ministry of Home Affairs, following the merger, Bình Thạnh has a land area of 3.32 km², the population as of December 31, 2024 is 126,300 people, the population density is 38,000 people/km².

== Division ==
As of 2026, Bình Thạnh ward is divided in to 53 quarters, numerical in order from 1 to 53.

== History ==
On June 16, 2025, the National Assembly Standing Committee issued Resolution No. 1685/NQ-UBTVQH15 on the arrangement of commune-level administrative units of Ho Chi Minh City in 2025 (effective from June 16, 2025). Accordingly, the entire land area and population of Ward 12, Ward 14 and Ward 26 of the former Bình Thạnh district will be integrated into a new ward named Bình Thạnh (Clause 55, Article 1).
