= Bình Triệu Bridge =

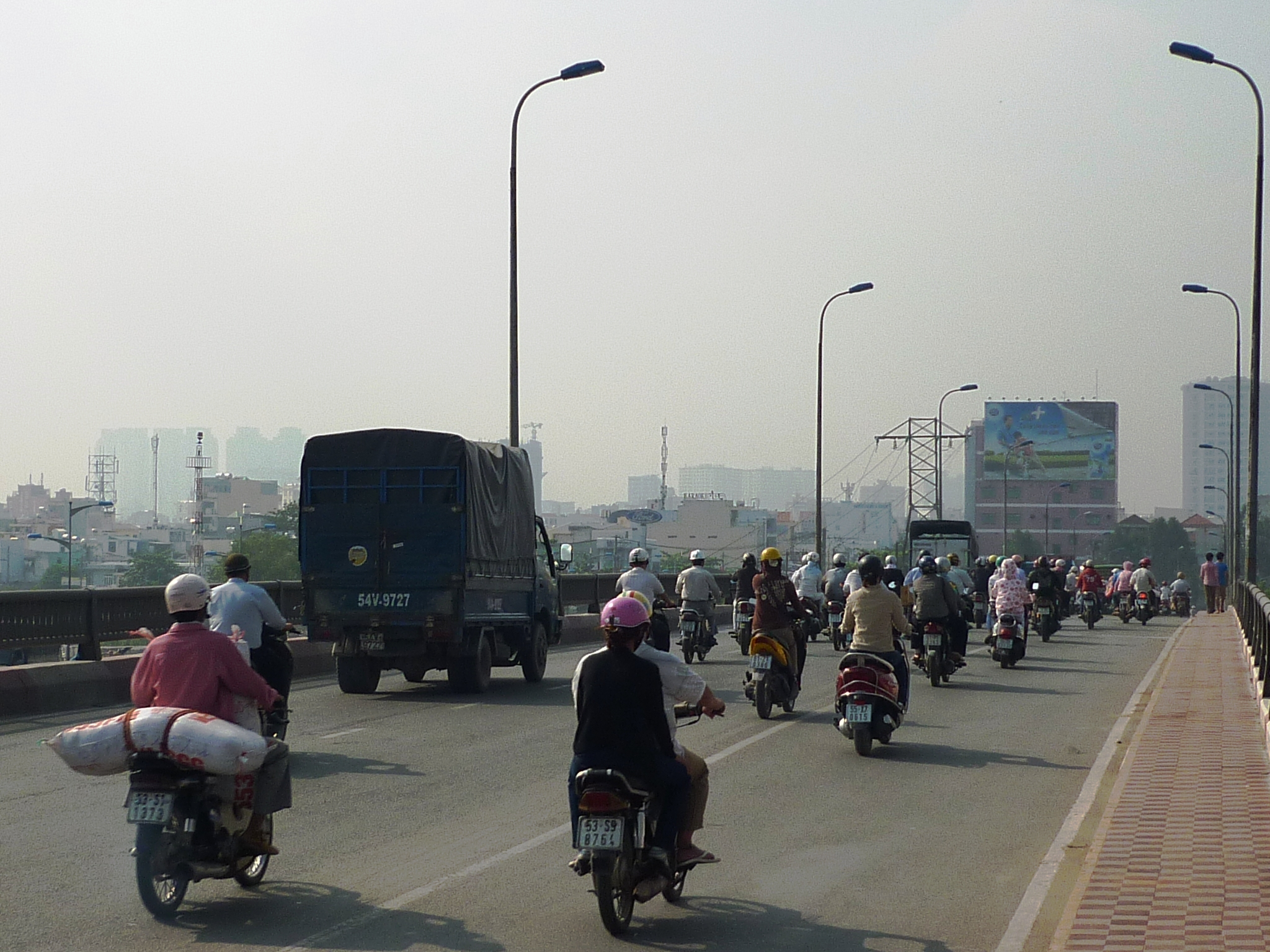
- Coordinates: 10°49′16″N 106°42′49″E

Location
- Interactive map of Bình Triệu Bridge

The Bình Triệu Bridge is a road bridge that crosses the Saigon River in Ho Chi Minh City. The road on the bridge heads out to Thủ Dầu Một.
