= Bình Lợi Trung =

Bình Lợi Trung Phường Bình Lợi Trung Bình Lợi
- Ward
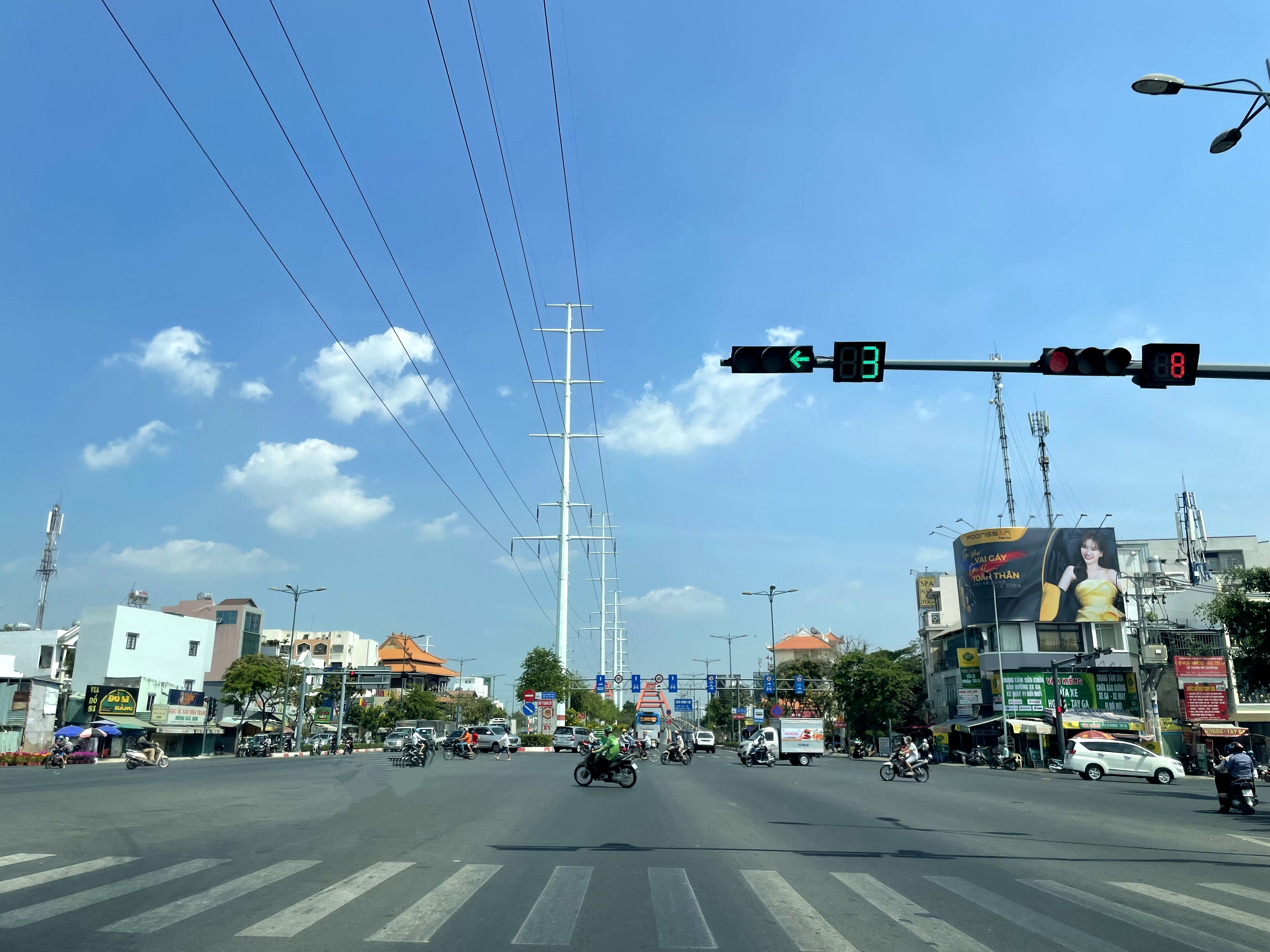
- Phạm Văn Đồng Boulevard
- Interactive map of Bình Lợi Trung
- Coordinates: 10°49′21″N 106°42′10″E
- Country: Vietnam
- Municipality: Ho Chi Minh City
- Established: June 16, 2025

Area
  - Total: 1.50 sq mi (3.89 km^{2})

Population (2024)
  - Total: 116,121
  - Density: 77,300/sq mi (29,900/km^{2})
- Time zone: UTC+07:00 (Indochina Time)
- Administrative code: 26905

Bình Lợi Trung (Vietnamese: Phường Bình Lợi Trung) is a ward of Ho Chi Minh City, Vietnam. It is one of the 168 new wards, communes and special zones of the city following the reorganization in 2025.

== Administration ==
Bình Lợi Trung is divided into 61 neighborhoods: 1, 2, 3, 4, 5, 6, 7, 8, 9, 10, 11, 12, 13, 14, 15, 16, 17, 18, 19, 20, 21, 22, 23, 24, 25, 26, 27, 28, 29, 30, 31, 32, 33, 34, 35, 36, 37, 38, 39, 40, 41, 42, 43, 44, 45, 46, 47, 48, 49, 50, 51, 52, 53, 54, 55, 56, 57, 58, 59, 60, 61.

== History ==
On June 16, 2025, the National Assembly Standing Committee issued Resolution No. 1685/NQ-UBTVQH15 on the arrangement of commune-level administrative units of Ho Chi Minh City in 2025 (effective from June 16, 2025). Accordingly, the entire land area and population of Ward 5, Ward 11 and Ward 13 of the former Bình Thạnh district will be integrated into a new ward named Bình Lợi Trung (Clause 44, Article 1).
