= Bình Thạnh district =

Bình Thạnh district Quận Bình Thạnh
- Urban district
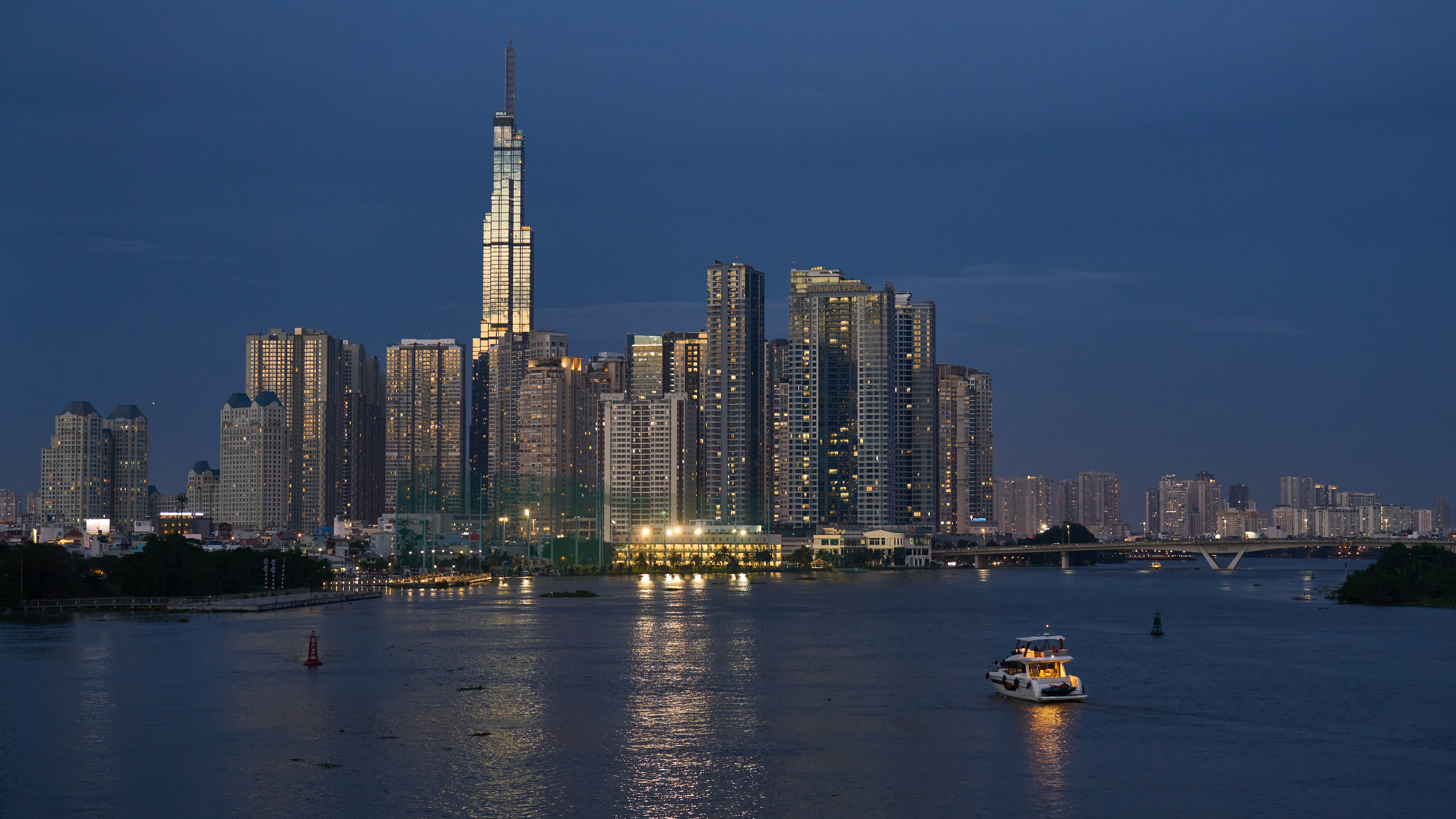
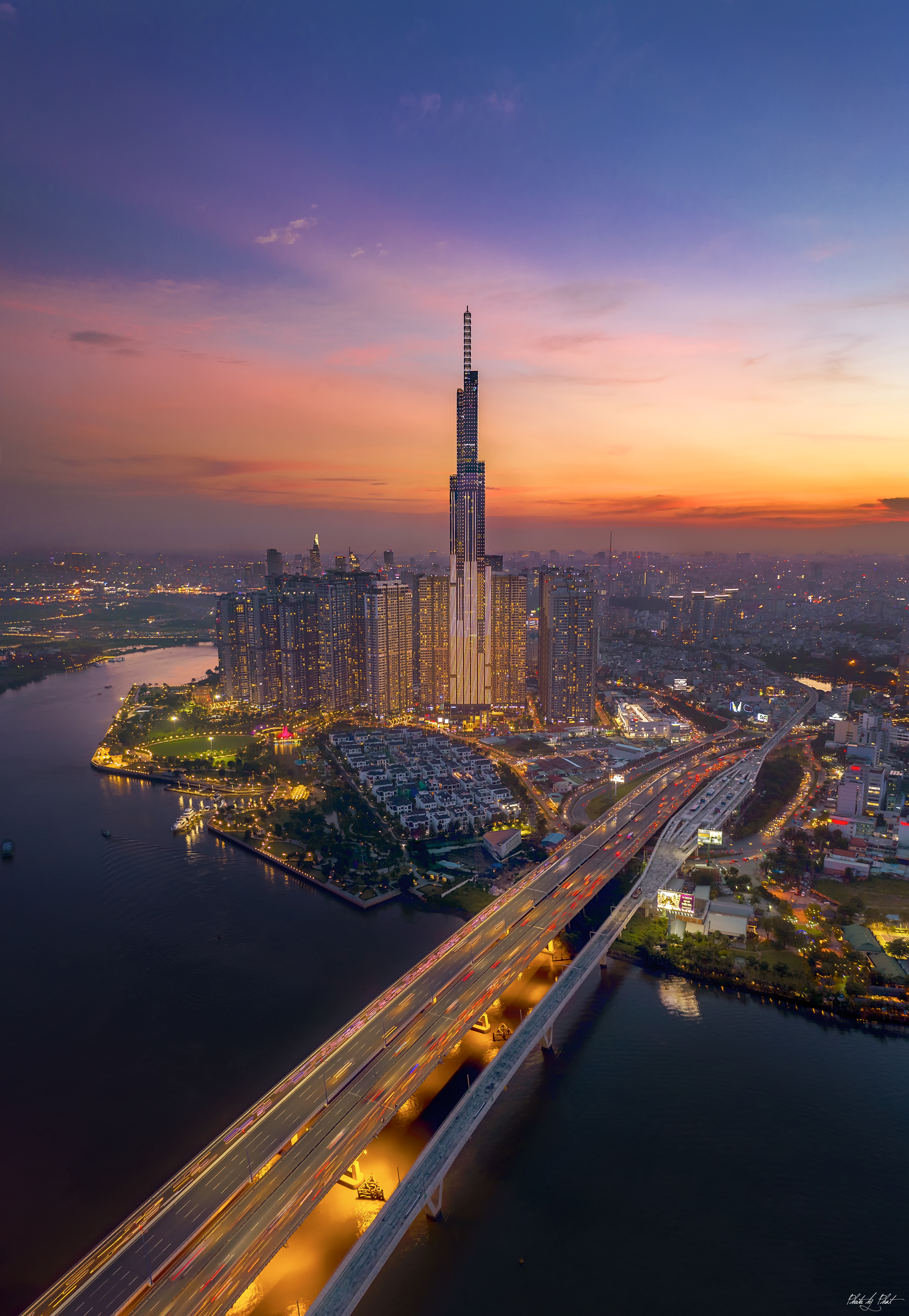
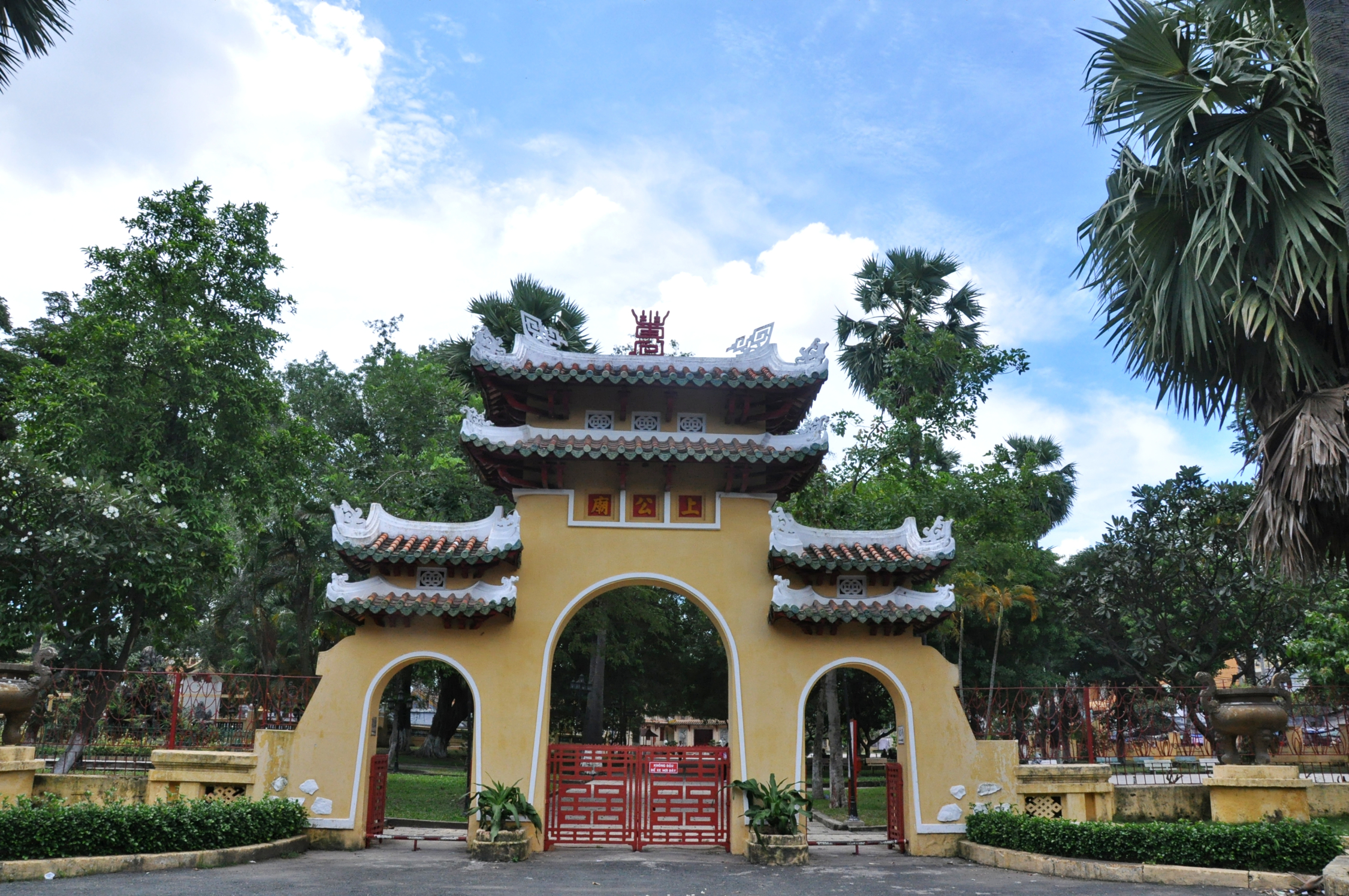
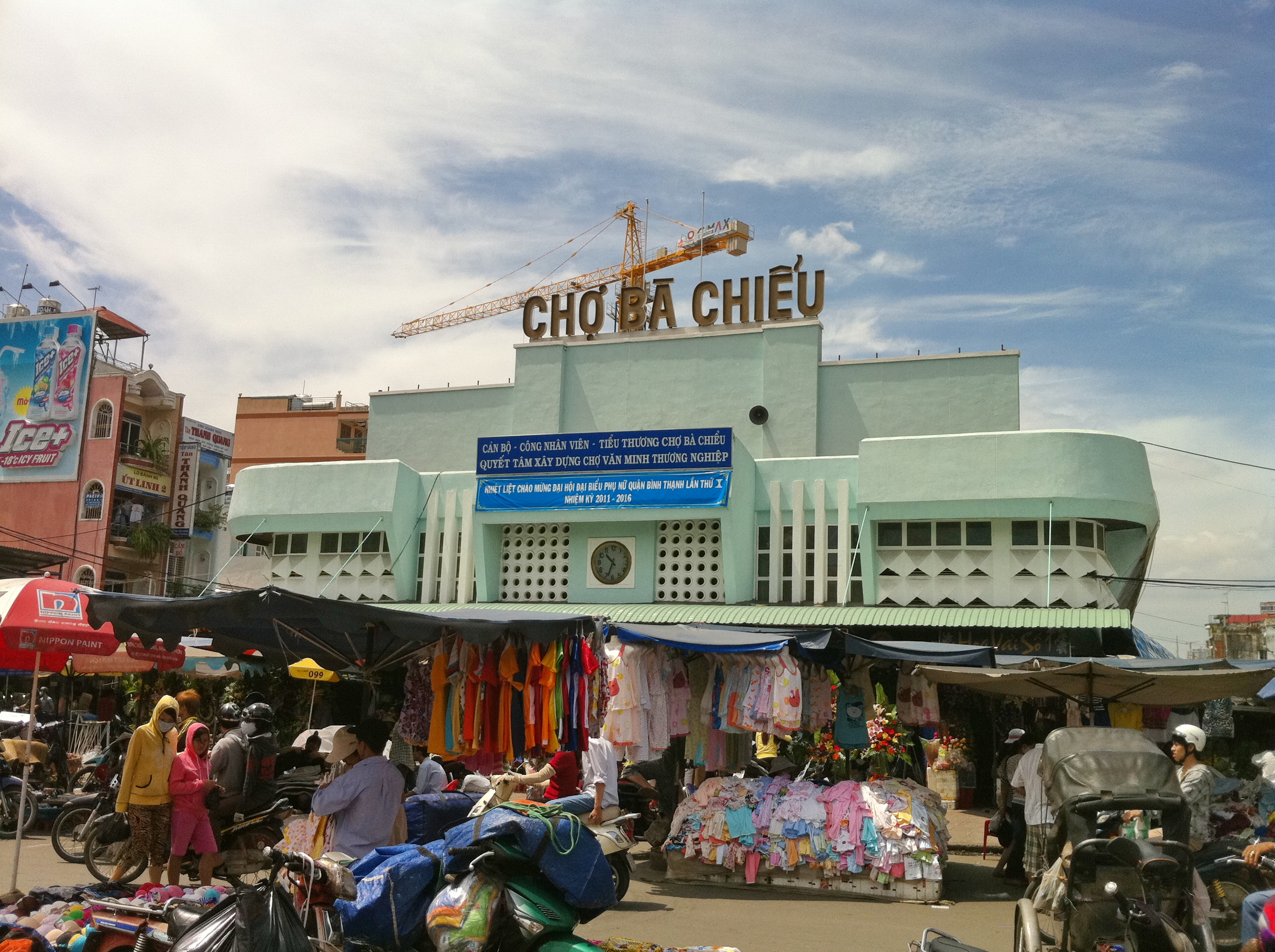
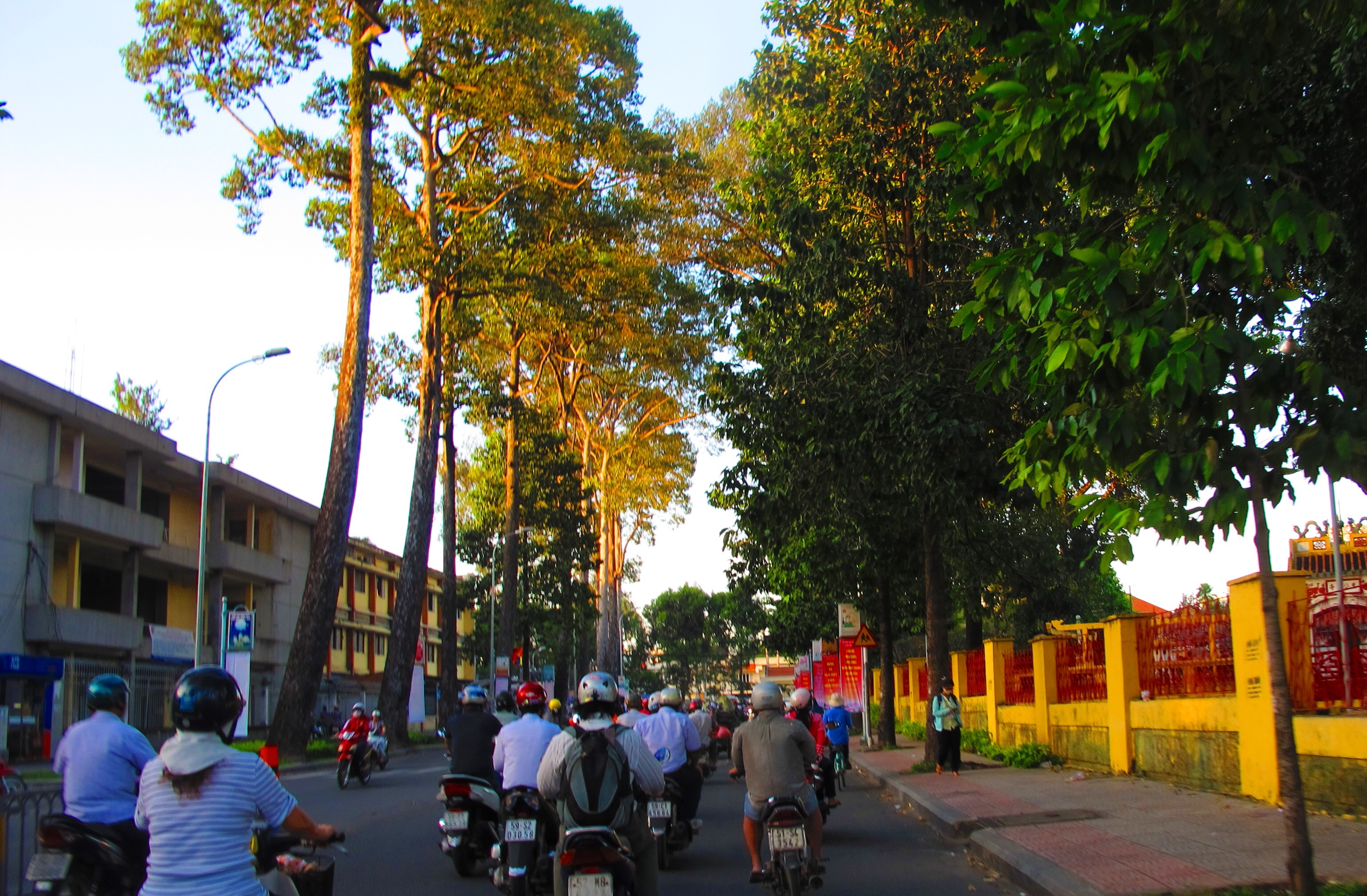
- Clockwise from top: Bình Thạnh skyline viewed from Ba Son Bridge, Tomb of Lê Văn Duyệt, Lê Văn Duyệt Boulevard towards Bình Thạnh District Hall (formerly Gia Định Province Hall), Bà Chiểu Market, Landmark 81 building and Saigon Bridge

- Seal

- Position in HCMC's core
- Interactive map of Bình Thạnh district
- Location within Vietnam Location within Southeast Asia Location within Asia
- Coordinates: 10°48′12″N 106°41′23″E
- Country: Vietnam
- Centrally Governed City: Ho Chi Minh City
- Established: June 1976
- Seat: L'Inspection de Gia Định, 6 Phan Đăng Lưu, Ward 14
- Wards: 20 wards

Government
  - People's Committee: Nguyễn Thị Thu Hà

Area
  - Total: 20.8 km^{2} (8.0 sq mi)

Population (2022)
  - Total: 552,164
  - Density: 26,500/km^{2} (68,800/sq mi)

Demographics
- Time zone: UTC+07 (ICT)
- Website: binhthanh.hochiminhcity.gov.vn

Bình Thạnh was a former district of Ho Chi Minh City in Vietnam. As of 2017, the district had a population of 490,618 and a total area of 21 km^{2}.

The name of the district was formed from the names of two wards in the old Gò Vấp district, Bình Hòa and Thạnh Mỹ Tây. In 1976, those two wards were removed from Gò Vấp District to create Bình Thạnh District.

== Administrative division ==
Bình Thạnh is divided into 20 wards. They are wards 1, 2, 3, 5, 6, 7, 11, 12, 13, 14, 15, 17, 19, 21, 22, 24, 25, 26, 27 and 28. Wards 4, 8, 9, 10, 16, 18, 20 and 23 have previously been dissolved and merged into other wards.

== Geographical location ==
Bình Thạnh District borders the city of Thủ Đức to the east by Saigon River, Phú Nhuận district to the west, District 1 to the south by Nhieu Loc–Thi Nghe Channel, Gò Vấp district and District 12 to the north by Xuyên Tâm Canal and Vàm Thuật River, respectively.

Bình Quới Tourist Village is located on the Thanh Đa Peninsula on the Saigon River.
