= Thủ Dầu Một (city) =

- Provincial city (Class-1)
- Thủ Dầu Một City; Thành phố Thủ Dầu Một
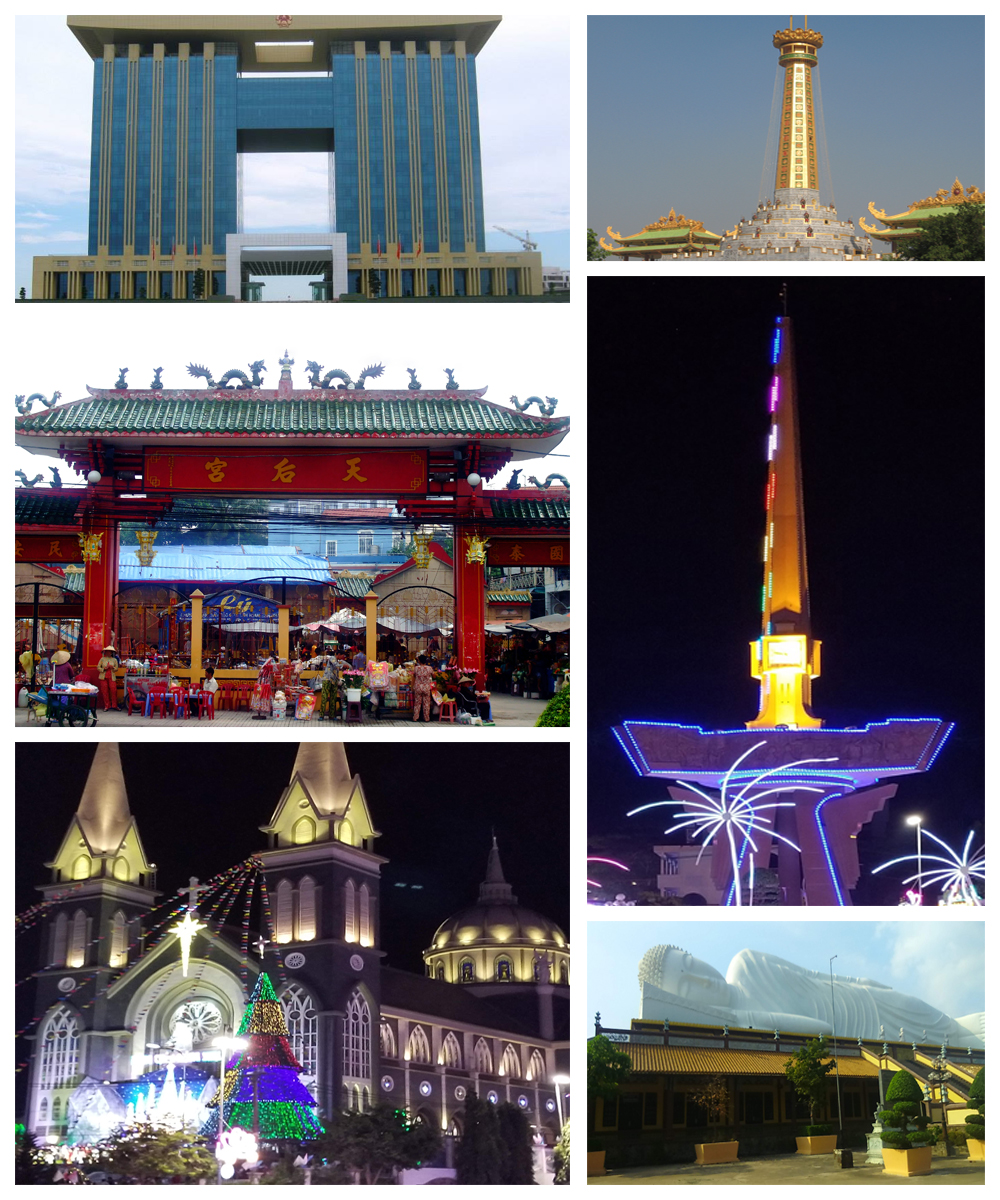
- Clockwise, from top left: Bình Dương Administration Center, Đại Nam Văn Hiến, Clock Tower of Thủ Dầu Một's six-way intersection, Hội Khánh Temple, Phú Cường Cathedral, Temple of Lady Thiên Hậu.

- Seal

- Location of Thủ Dầu Một in Vietnam Thủ Dầu Một (Southeast Asia) Thủ Dầu Một (Asia)
- Coordinates: 10°58′N 106°39′E
- Country: Vietnam
- Province: Bình Dương (now Ho Chi Minh City)

Area
  - Total: 118.91 km^{2} (45.91 sq mi)

Population (2024 census)
  - Total: 373,105
  - Density: 3,137.7/km^{2} (8,126.6/sq mi)

Metro GDP (PPP, constant 2015 values)
  - Year: 2023
  - Total: $10.8 billion
  - Per capita: $22,400
- Time zone: UTC+7 (Indochina Time)
- Website: thudaumot.binhduong.gov.vn

Thủ Dầu Một is a former city located in the Southeast region of Vietnam. It was the capital city of the former Bình Dương province (now merged to Ho Chi Minh City), Vietnam, located at around 10°58′0″N 106°39′0″E. The city had an area of 118.91 km², with a population of 373,105 (as of 2024), and was located on the left bank of the Saigon River, upstream from the city.

== Geography ==
Thủ Dầu Một lies to the central southwest of Bình Dương province and is on the Saigon River.

- To the east is Tân Uyên
- To the west is Củ Chi district, Ho Chi Minh City by Saigon River
- To the south is Thuận An
- To the north is Bến Cát

== Administrative divisions ==
Thủ Dầu Một has 14 wards:

1. Phú Cường
2. Chánh Mỹ
3. Chánh Nghĩa
4. Định Hòa
5. Hiệp An
6. Hiệp Thành
7. Hòa Phú
8. Phú Hòa
9. Phú Lợi
10. Phú Mỹ
11. Phú Tân
12. Phú Thọ
13. Tân An
14. Tương Bình Hiệp

== Etymology ==
In the past, some researchers have claimed that the name Thủ Dầu Một originates from Khmer language. However, other authors claim that the name Thủ Dầu Một is a compound of Vietnamese language roots, combining thủ, to "keep" or "guard", dầu referring to oil-producing trees of the genus Dipterocarpus, and the number một or "one". The toponym Dầu Một existed prior, in reference to large number of Dipterocarpus trees lining the port where there was a market in this area. In the 1940s, many of these were cut down; thus, the place name Thủ Dầu Một can be understood as "the only large oil tree growing, located next to the fort". Other toponyms in the area do follow similar tree + numeral structures, such as Xoài Tư (literally "Mango" + "Four") and Quéo Ba ("Mangifera reba" + "Three").

According to a third oral tradition, in a fort (thủ) in Bình An, there was a large oil tree on the hill. Thus the original name would have been Thủ Dầu Miệt, which literally means "Oil-Tree Fort Region"; later, miệt underwent a sound change to một.

== History ==
In 1976, the National Assembly of Vietnam decided to merge Bình Dương Province and Bình Phước Province (which comprised the former provinces of Bình Long and Phước Long) into a new province called Sông Bé. Thủ Dầu Một Town became the provincial capital of Sông Bé.

In 2007, the Ministry of Construction recognized Thủ Dầu Một as a Grade-III urban area.

On May 2, 2012, the government issued Resolution No. 11/NQ-CP on the establishment of Thủ Dầu Một City.

On July 8, 2014, Thủ Dầu Một was recognized as a Grade-II urban area, and on December 6, 2017, it officially became a Grade-I city under Bình Dương Province.

On June 12, 2025, Bình Dương province was merged to Ho Chi Minh City, along with Bà Rịa–Vũng Tàu province. Therefore, the city ceased its existence as a munipical city.

== Economy ==
Thủ Dầu Một has seen a rapid expansion and economic development since 1997, as the province has become an important industrial hub of the region. In January 2007, the district-level town then was officially recognized as a third-class town. It became a city in July 2012. Bình Dương New City, a 4,200-ha urban-tech park, was developed. Thủ Dầu Một will be a modern city within the Hồ Chí Minh City Metropolitan Area (including Thủ Dầu Một, Nhơn Trạch, Tân An, Biên Hòa and parts of Đồng Nai and Bình Dương provinces).

It became a first-class city on 6 December 2017.

== Transport ==
Air travel is served by Ho Chi Minh City's Tan Son Nhat International Airport which is approximately 29 km south of Thủ Dầu Một. There are also direct road and bus links to the city from Ho Chi Minh City.

== Points of interest ==
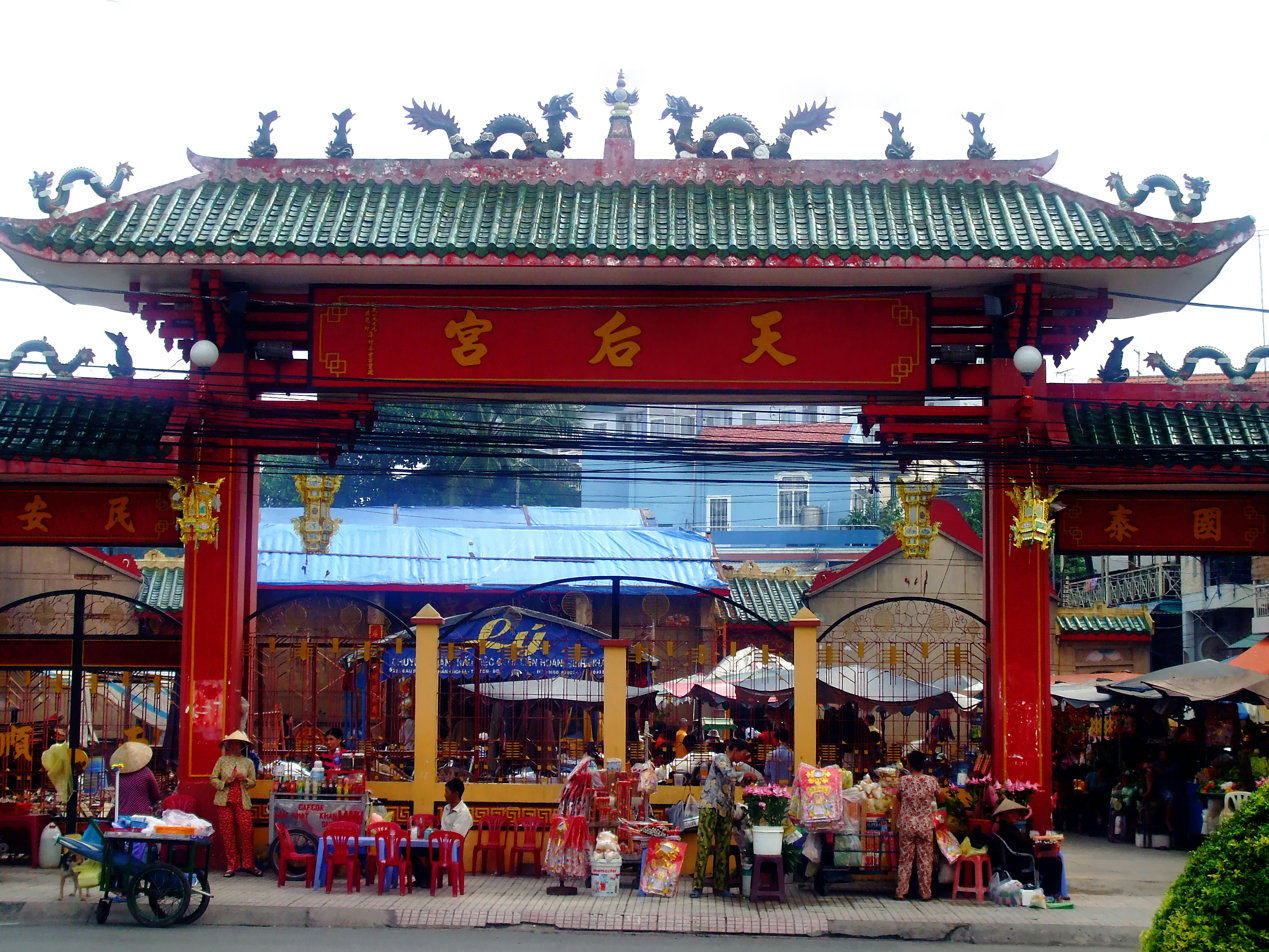
Lady Thiên Hậu Pagoda (or Lady Mazu Pagoda)

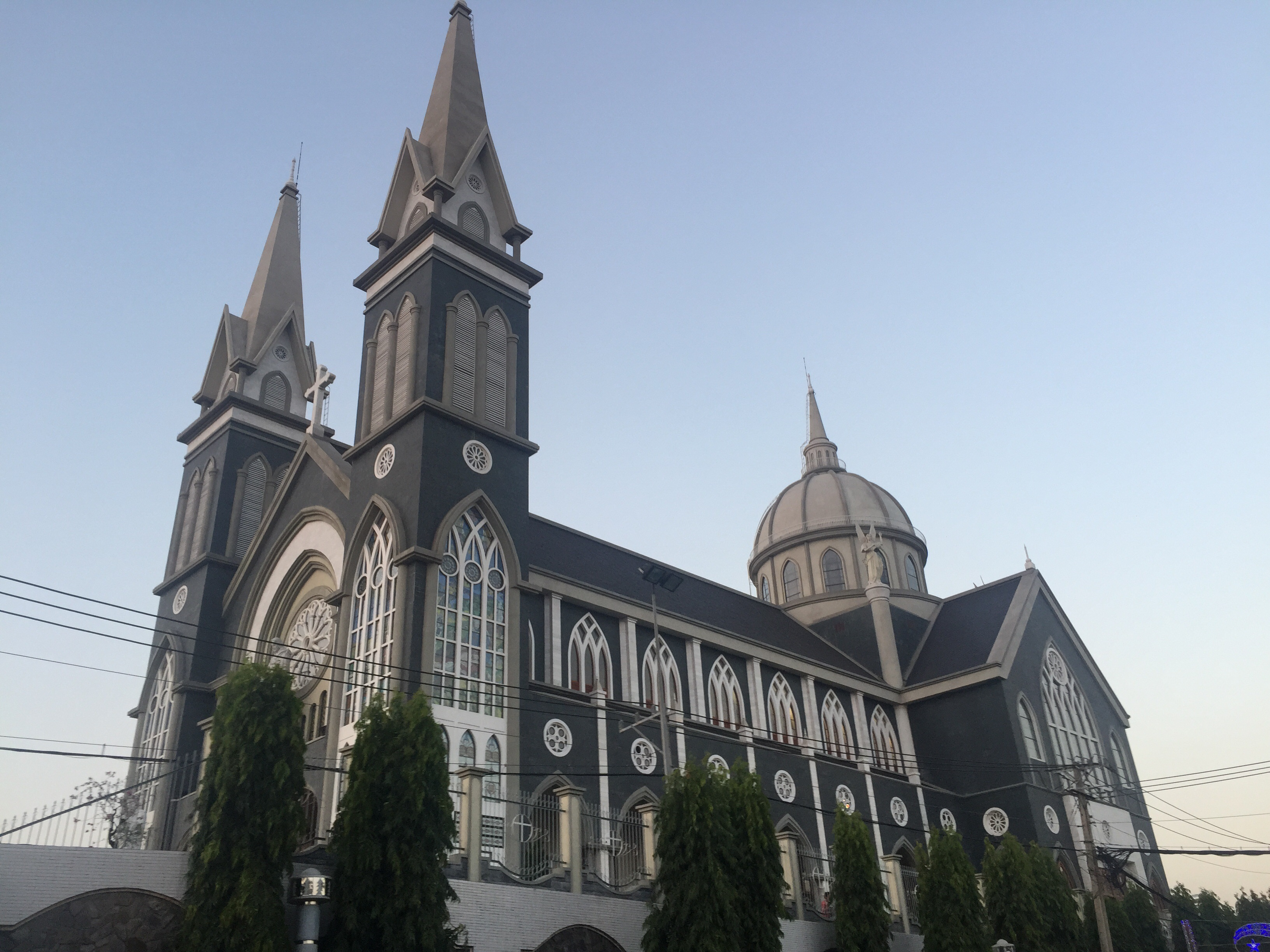
Phú Cường Cathedral

- Hội Khánh Temple
- Thien Hau Temple of Phú Cường
- Đại Nam Văn Hiến Theme Park
- The Ông temple
- Bình Dương New City
- Bạch Đằng Riverside Park
- Thủ Dầu Một Market (also known as Phú Cường or Bình Dương Market)
- The lacquer village of Tương Bình Hiệp
- The ceramic village
- Prison of Phú Lợi
- Ancient house by the market of Thủ Dầu Một
