= Thien Hau Temple =

Thien Hau Temple (Vietnamese: Chùa Bà Thiên Hậu) is the Vietnamese name for a Mazu temple, and can refer to:

- Thien Hau Temple of Cholon, Ho Chi Minh City
- Thien Hau Temple (Los Angeles)
- Thien Hau Temple of Phú Cường, Ho Chi Minh City
