= Dĩ An station =

Railway station in Vietnam

Dĩ An
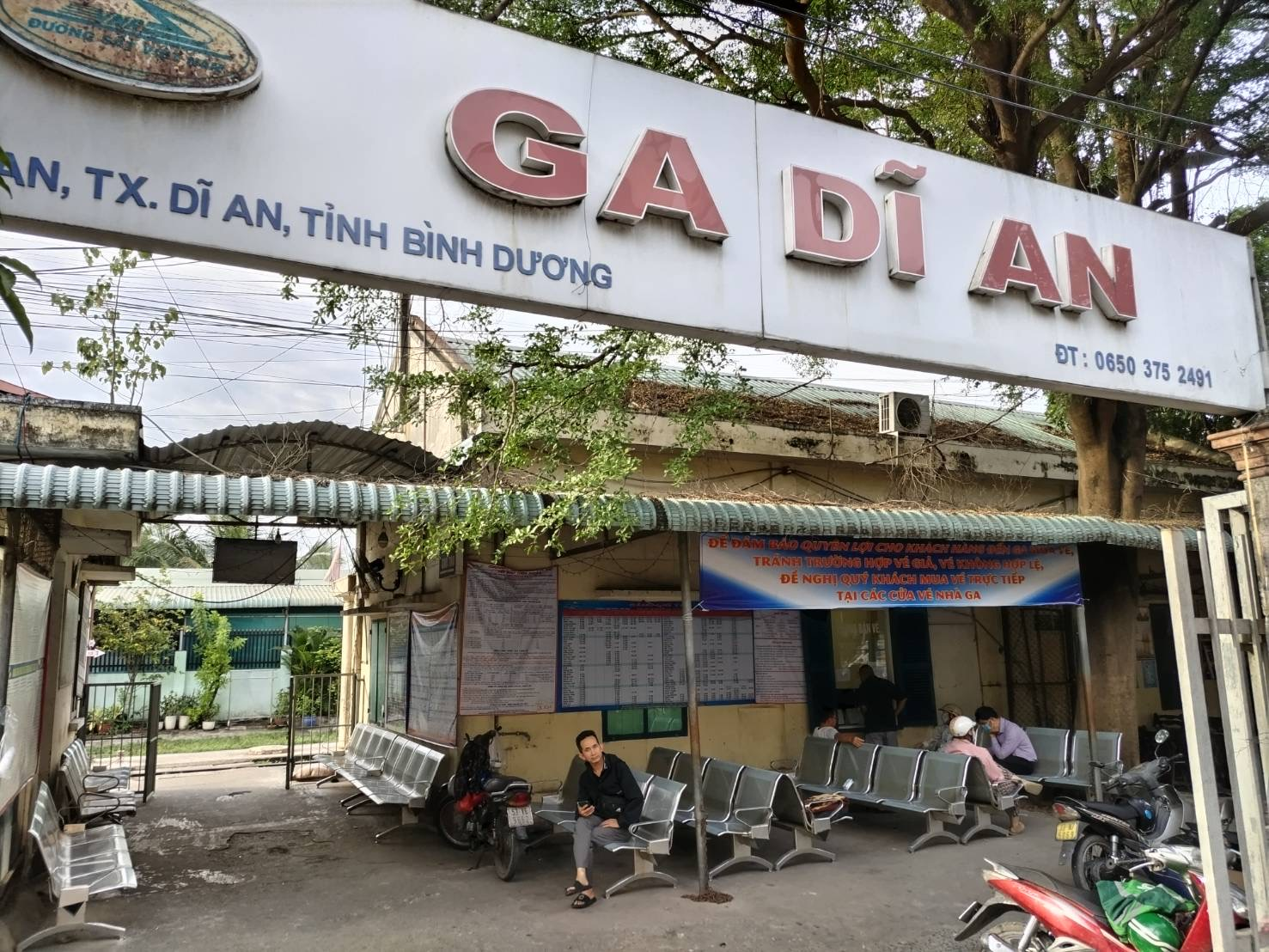

General information
- Location: Vietnam
- Coordinates: 10°54′28″N 106°46′9″E

Services
Preceding station	Vietnam Railways	Following station
Biên Hòa towards Hanoi	North–South	Sóng Thần towards Saigon
Location

Dĩ An station is a railway station on the North–South railway (Reunification Express) line in Vietnam. It serves the town of Dĩ An in Bình Dương Province.

There is a branch line from here to the Dĩ An train workshop.

The Dĩ An railyards were notable as a centre of trade union activity in the 1930s, during French Indochina.
