= Sóng Thần station =

Railway station in Vietnam

Sóng Thần

General information
- Location: Dĩ An, Bình Dương, Vietnam
- Coordinates: 10°52′44″N 106°45′07″E

Services
Preceding station	Vietnam Railways	Following station
Dĩ An towards Hanoi	North–South	Bình Triệu towards Saigon
Location

Sóng Thần station is a railway station on the North–South railway (Reunification Express) in Vietnam. It serves the town of Dĩ An in Bình Dương Province.
