= Bình Dương province =

Former province of Vietnam

Bình Dương
- Province
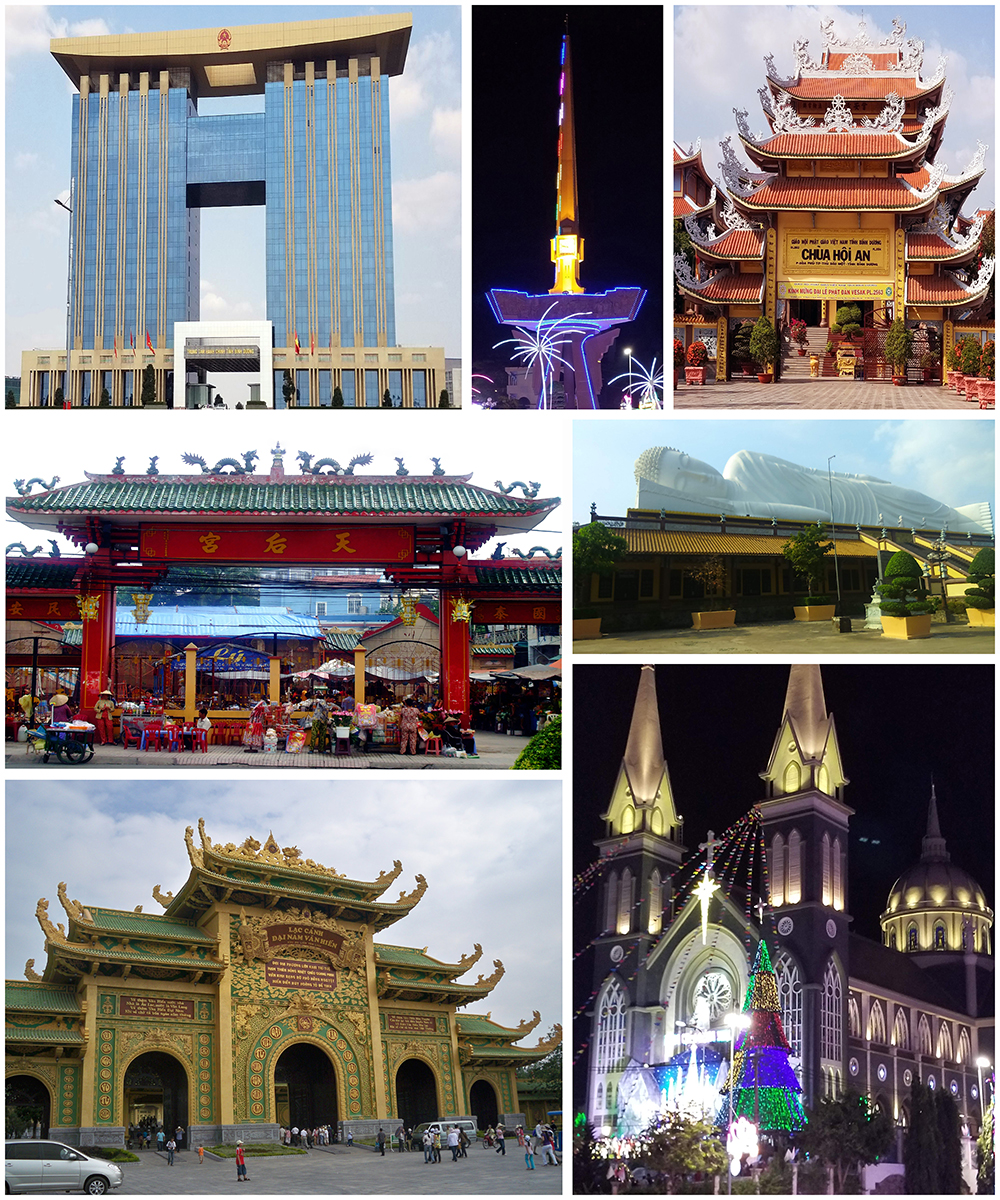
- Clockwise, from top left: Bình Dương Administration Center, Clock Tower of Thủ Dầu Một's six-way intersection, Hội An Temple, Hội Khánh Temple, Phú Cường Cathedral, Đại Nam Văn Hiến, Temple of Lady Thiên Hậu.

- Seal
- Nickname: The industrial capital of the South
- Location of Bình Dương within Vietnam

- Location within Vietnam Location within Asia
- Coordinates: 11°10′N 106°40′E
- Country: Vietnam
- Region: Southeast
- Metropolitan area: Ho Chi Minh City metropolitan area
- Capital: Thủ Dầu Một

Government
  - People's Council Chairman: Phạm Văn Chánh
  - People's Committee Chairman: Võ Văn Minh
  - Member of the Party Central Committee, Secretary of Binh Duong Party Committee: Trần Văn Nam

Area
  - Total: 2,694.64 km^{2} (1,040.41 sq mi)

Population (2025)
  - Total: 2,722,527
  - Density: 1,010.35/km^{2} (2,616.79/sq mi)
- Demonym(s): Binh Duong people Binzuonese

Demographics
  - Ethnicities: Vietnamese, Khmer, Tày, Hoa, Xtiêng

GDP
  - Total: VND 483.032 trillion US$ 20.750 billion (2023)
- Time zone: UTC+7 (ICT)
- Area codes: 650 (until 16 July 2017); 274 (from 17 June 2017)
- ISO 3166 code: VN-57
- HDI (2020): ▲0.756 (14th)
- Website: www.binhduong.gov.vn

Bình Dương is a former province of Vietnam. It was located in the Southeast region of the country and the Southern Key Economic Zone, bordering Bình Phước province to the north, Ho Chi Minh City (Sài Gòn) to the south and southwest, Tây Ninh province to the west, and Đồng Nai province to the east. The province was created from Sông Bé province on 1 January 1997 and dissolved on 12 June 2025 to be incorporated in Ho Chi Minh City.

Bình Dương was considered to be the gateway to Ho Chi Minh City, the economic cultural centre and most populous city of the country. Endowed with convenient geography conditions, Bình Dương had an extremely important road network. Major highways of the country crossed Bình Dương such as Ho Chi Minh Highway, National Route 13 and 14, Ho Chi Minh City Ring Road 3 and 4, Ho Chi Minh City–Chơn Thành–Hoa Lư Expressway and the Trans-Asian Highway (AH1, AH17) with other major provincial roads. Bình Dương was only 10–25 kilometres (6.2–15.5 mi) from Tân Sơn Nhất International Airport and important ports in the southern part of the province and in the northern part is under 70 kilometres (43 mi). All of the advantages created favourable conditions to achieve social and economic development.

== Geography ==
Bình Dương province was situated on relatively level terrain, and was crossed by the Saigon, Đồng Nai, and Bé rivers. It also had some hills. Bình Dương can be seen from the Lái Thiêu central church. Although Bình Dương was flat, it was higher than Ho Chi Minh City. Across Bình Dương there were many different topographic regions, including low mountainous terrain with slight undulation, flat plains and alluvial valleys. There were some low mountains, including Châu Thới in Dĩ An and Cậu mountain (also called Lấp Vò) in Dầu Tiếng district and some low hills. Natural effects have created many different types of landform including worn areas, accumulative areas (due to the deposition of corrosive materials in the flow) and some areas that are worn, accumulative and depositional at the same time. This is due to rainfall and the flow affecting the ground, with the effects of wind, temperature, climate, the erosion and collapse due to gravity of the geology. The impact took place over millions of years.

=== Climate ===
Bình Dương's climate, like the climate of the rest of the Southeast region, is hot and rainy, with high humidity. It has a tropical monsoon climate, divided into two distinct dry and wet seasons. The rainy season usually starts in May and lasts until late October. In the early months of the rainy season, there are regular short but heavy showers, while July, August, and September usually have continuous rain, sometimes lasting for 1–2 days. Bình Dương seldom experiences typhoons and is only otherwise affected by local storms. The average annual temperature in Bình Dương is 26–27 °C (79–81 °F), with the highest temperature recorded reaching 39.3 °C (102.7 °F), but the overnight low can fall to 16–17 °C (61–63 °F). In the dry season, the average annual humidity is between 76–80%, with the highest at 86% in September and the lowest at 66% in February. The average rainfall each year is 1,800–2,000 mm, but rainfall at Sở Sao crossroads in Bình Dương regularly measures up to 2,113.3 mm.

== History ==
Binh Duong was formerly part of Thu Dau Mot Province, which was established in January 1898. In September 1956, according to Decree No. 143-NV issued by the Republic of Vietnam government, Thu Dau Mot Province was divided into three new provinces: Binh Duong, Binh Long, and Phuoc Long.

By 1976, Binh Duong was merged with Binh Long and Phuoc Long to form Song Be Province. However, on November 6, 1996, Binh Duong was re-established as a separate province, consisting of Thu Dau Mot Town and three districts: Ben Cat, Tan Uyen, and Thuan An.

On 12 June 2025, as part of major nationwide reforms, Binh Duong was dissolved and merged with Ho Chi Minh City.

== Demographics ==
History of developing population
Year	Population
1995	639,000
1996	658,500
1997	679,000
1998	700,100
1999	720,800
2000	779,400
2001	845,500
2002	910,000
2003	973,100
2004	1,037,100
2005	1,109,300
2006	1,203,700
2007	1,307,000
2008	1,402,700
2009	1,512,500
2010	1,619,900
2011	1,691,400
2012	1,748,000
2013	1,802,500
2017	2,051,906
2019	2,426,561

Originally, the area now known as Bình Dương was heavily forested, and was dominated by peoples of the Xtiêng, Chơ Ro, Mnong, and Khmer Krom ethnic groups. In the 17th century, however, ethnic Vietnamese settlers arrived in the region from the east. Most were peasants, seeking to escape poverty by gaining land of their own. There were also a number of refugees from a war between two feudal houses. In 1698, there were enough people in the area that a prominent Vietnamese general was sent to establish official institutions and enforce law. From that point, Bình Dương developed rapidly, with extensive clearance of forests to make room for crops. The province is now dominated by ethnic Vietnamese.

== Administrative divisions ==
Bình Dương was subdivided into nine district-level sub-divisions:

- Four districts:
  - Bàu Bàng
  - Bắc Tân Uyên
  - Dầu Tiếng
  - Phú Giáo
- Five provincial cities:
  - Thủ Dầu Một (capital)
  - Dĩ An
  - Thuận An
  - Tân Uyên
  - Bến Cát

They are further subdivided into four commune-level towns (or townlets), 42 communes, and 45 wards.

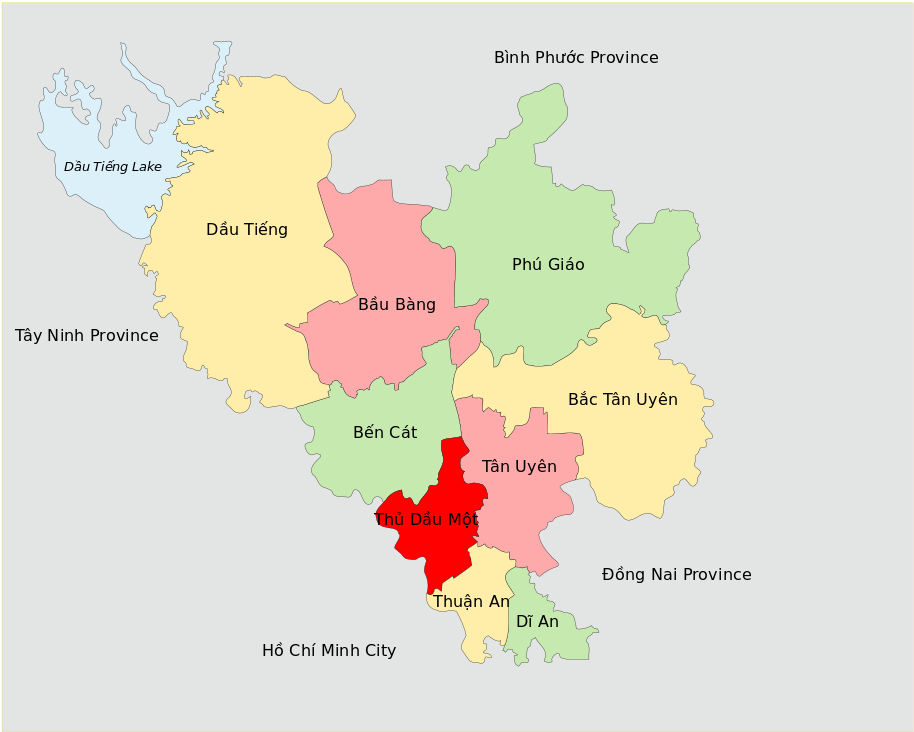
The administrative divisions of Bình Dương province

List of administrative divisions of Bình Dương province

Name	Area (km^{2})	Population (people)^{2021}	Density (people/km^{2})	Administrative divisions
Cities (5)
Thủ Dầu Một	118.67	336,705	2,832	14 wards
Dĩ An	60.1	493,291	8,215	7 wards
Thuận An	83.69	618,984	7,394	9 wards, 1 commune
Tân Uyên	192.5	421,694	2,199	6 wards, 6 communes
Bến Cát	234.422	355,663	1,520	5 wards, 3 communes

Name	Area (km<sup)	Population (people)^{2021}	Density (people/km<sup)	Administrative divisions
Districts (4)
Bắc Tân Uyên	400.08	74,867	187	1 townlet, 9 communes
Bàu Bàng	339.15	105,371	310	1 townlet, 6 communes
Dầu Tiếng	719.84	118,057	164	1 townlet, 11 communes
Phú Giáo	543	101,507	186	1 townlet, 10 communes

== Economy ==
The area is considered to be good cropland, and agriculture is an important industry in the province. Bình Dương is also home to a significant manufacturing industry, and in the first half of 2004, the province had the second highest levels of foreign investment in Vietnam. Nike, Adidas, H&M, Lego, McDonald's, etc. have set up factories to manufacture goods they sell locally and abroad in the province. The southern cities Dĩ An and Thuận An of the province are highly urbanised and are now encompassed within the Ho Chi Minh City metropolitan area.

In the first half of 2018, foreign investment in Bình Dương totaled US$850 million, more than 60% of the target. Since 2016, the province has attracted US$5.7 billion worth of FDI. At its current growth rate, Bình Dương will exceed the target of US$7 billion set for its 5-year plan until 2020. In 2019, Bình Dương has targeted a GRDP of 8.4–8.6% and a per capita income of VND140 million (more than US$6,030).

Thủ Dầu Một is the economic and administrative center of Bình Dương province. Located in the southern key economic region and the Ho Chi Minh City region, Thủ Dầu Một lies on HCM City's radial arterial road and the HCM City-Thủ Dầu Một-Chơn Thành Expressway. The administration of Thủ Dầu Một has exerted efforts to increase the proportion of services and industry in the city.

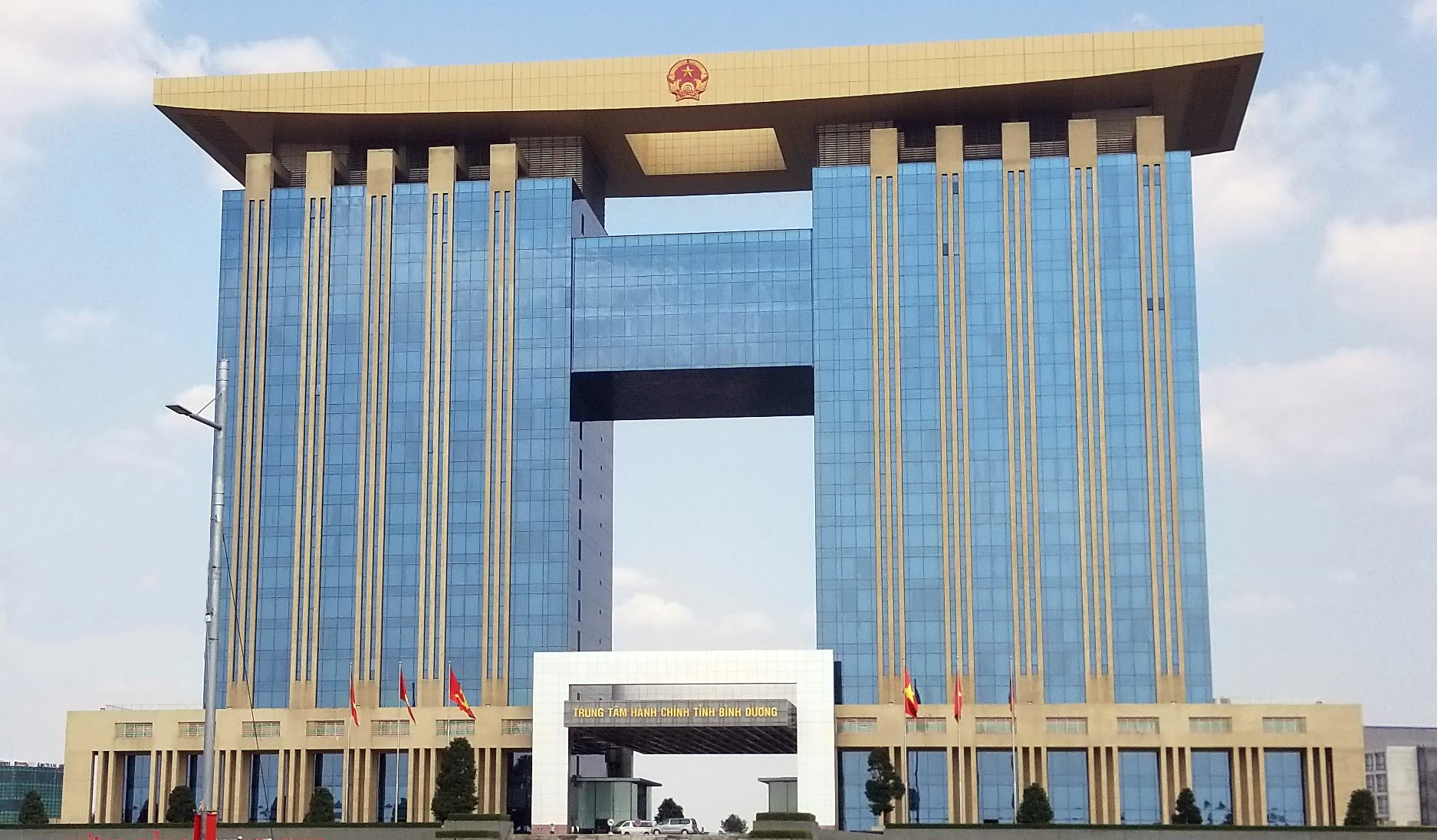
Bình Dương Provincial Administration Center in Bình Dương New City, Thủ Dầu Một

Japan is currently the largest foreign investor among 64 countries and territories investing in the southern province of Bình Dương with 304 valid projects worth nearly US$5.7 billion.

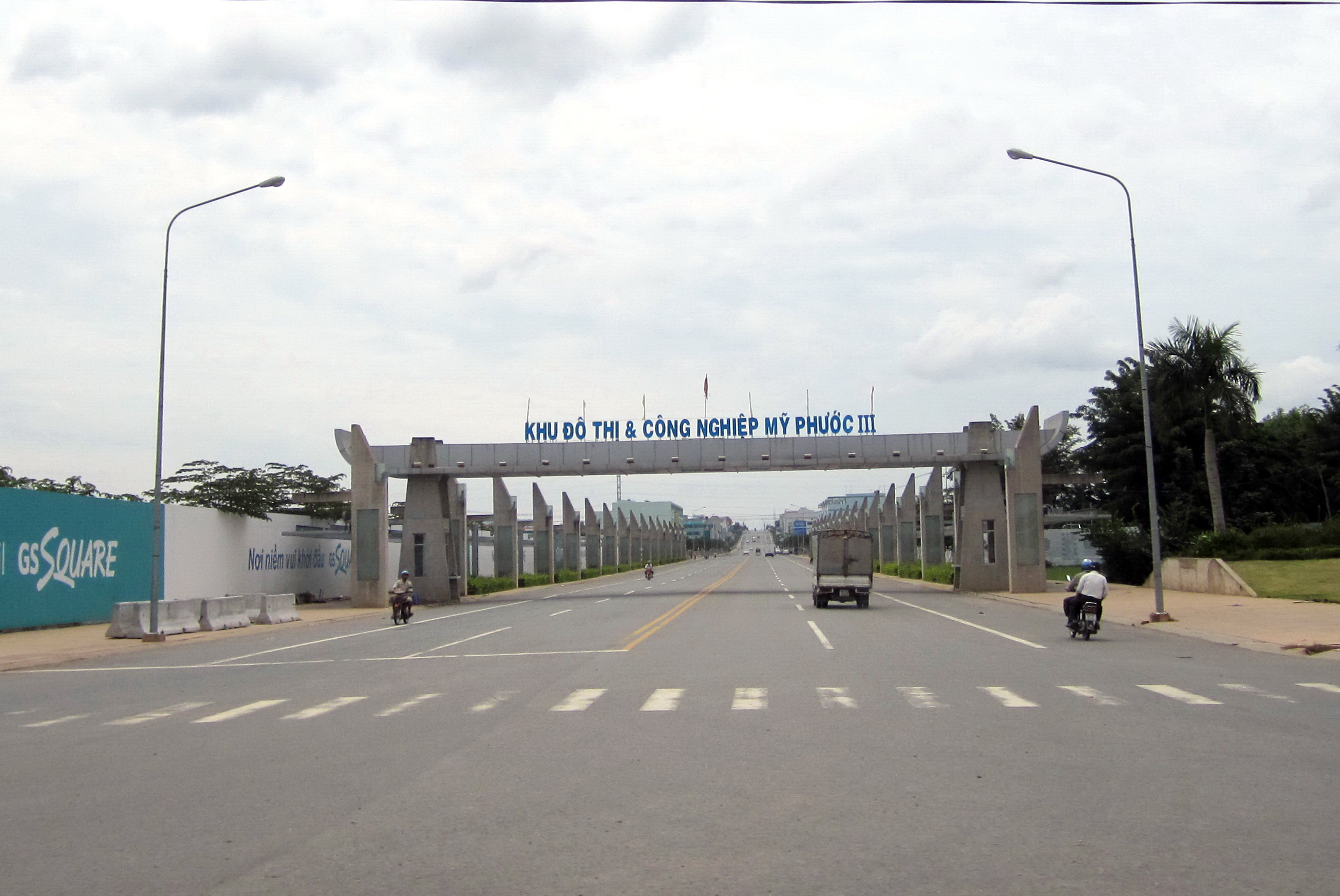
Mỹ Phước 3 Industrial Park in Bến Cát City

List of Bình Dương's industrial cluster and industrial parks:

- Vietnam – Singapore Industrial Park (VSIP)
- Việt Hương 1, 2 Industrial Park
- Thới Hoà Industrial Park
- Tân Đông Hiệp A and B Industrial Parks
- Sóng Thần 1, 2 and 3 Industrial Parks
- Rạch Bắp Industrial Park
- Nam Tân Uyên Industrial Park
- Mỹ Phước 1, 2 and 3 Industrial Parks
- Mai Trung Industrial Park
- Ascendas – Protrade Industrial Park
- Kim Huy Industrial Park
- Tân Bình industrial Park
- Đông An 1 and 2 Industrial Parks
- Phú Gia Industrial Park
- Bầu Bàng Industrial Park
- Bình An Industrial Park
- Bình Dương Industrial Park
- Đại Đăng Industrial Park
- Đất Cuốc Industrial Park
- Thanh An Industrial Cluster
- Uyên Hưng Industrial Cluster
- Tân Mỹ Industrial Cluster
- Beautiful City Industrial Cluster
- Phú Chánh Industrial Cluster
- Tân Đông Hiệp Industrial Cluster
- Bình Chuẩn Industrial Cluster
- An Thạnh Industrial Cluster

== Business environment ==
On Vietnam's Provincial Competitiveness Index 2023, a key tool for evaluating the business environment in Vietnam’s provinces, Binh Duong received a score of 66.43. This was an improvement from 2022 in which the province received a score of 65.13. In 2023, the province received its highest scores on the 'Law & Order' and 'Time Costs' criterion and lowest on 'Policy Bias' and 'Labour Policy'.

== Tourism ==
As one of the important elements, the system of cultural institutions has gotten development at the same time as main works in Bình Dương New City. Speeding up investment in cultural institutions in the new city has helped the local residents and tourists to have more selections for their entertainment demand. Over the past 5 years, Bình Dương's tourism sector has reached stable growth with an annual average increase of 17% in revenue and 0.5% in the number of tourists. The Provincial People's Committee is actively implementing projects on ecotourism and traditional craft village tourism development along with Đồng Nai province to bring into full play and preserve the local historical and cultural features. Between 2016 and 2020, the tourism sector will strive to account for around 27.2% of the local economic structure. The province will focus on effectively tapping geographic advantages. Some tourist potentials include diversifying tourism types and tourism promotion activities and strengthening tourism cooperation with HCM city and other localities in the region. Bình Dương is now home to ecotourism zones, historical-cultural relics together with traditional craft villages on things such as lacquer, pottery and wooden shoes.

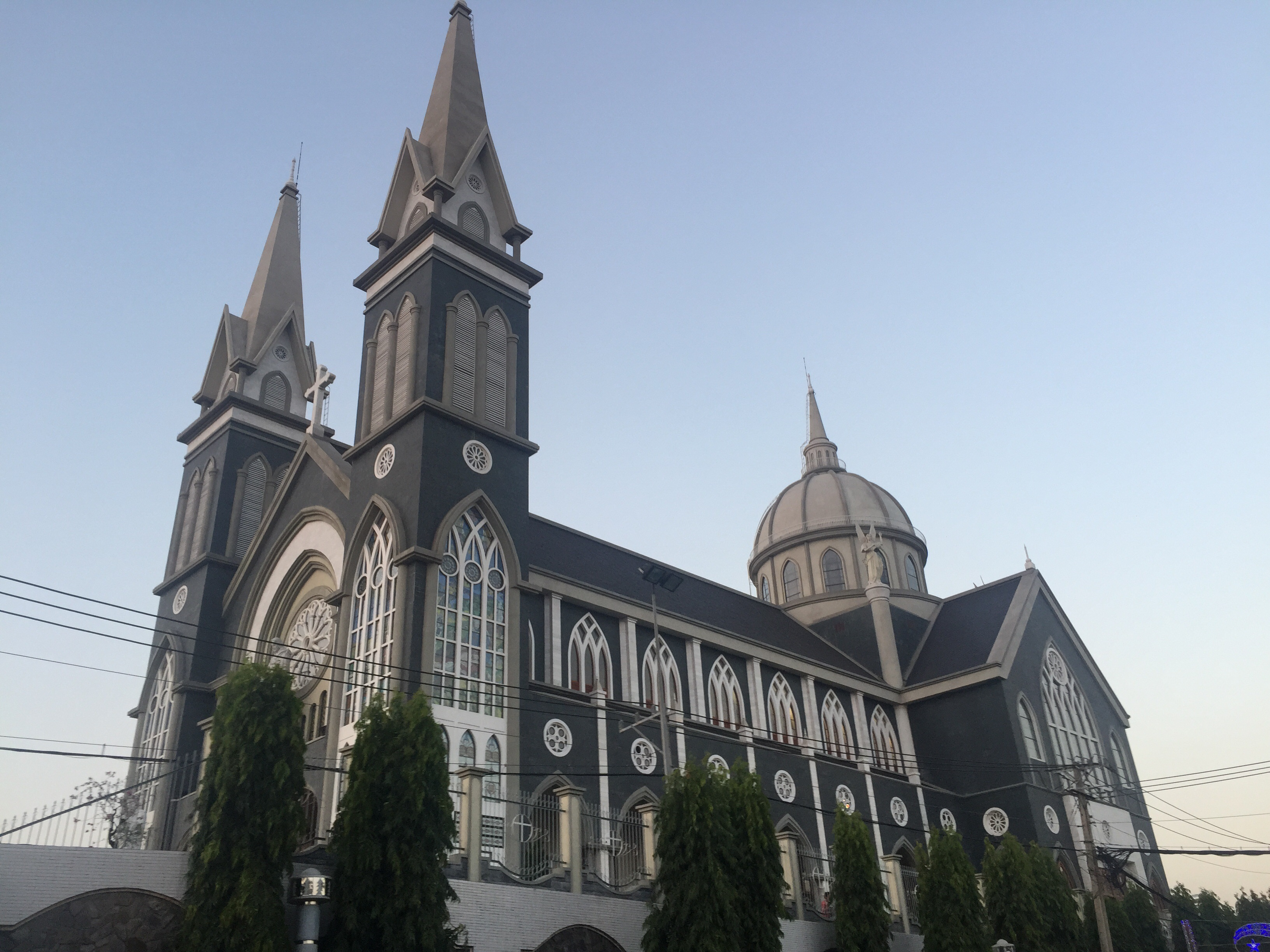
Phú Cường Cathedral in Downtown Thủ Dầu Một

According to VOV, eight must-visit places in Bình Dương (mainly in Thủ Dầu Một) are:

- Phú An bamboo village (Bến Cát)
- Bình Dương New City Park (Thủ Dầu Một)
- Hội Khánh Temple (Thủ Dầu Một)
- Phú Cường Cathedral (Thủ Dầu Một)
- Tay Tang Pagoda (Thủ Dầu Một)
- Đại Nam Văn Hiến (Thủ Dầu Một)
- Thủy Châu tourist site (Dĩ An)
- Wind and Water Cafe (Thủ Dầu Một)

== Festivals ==
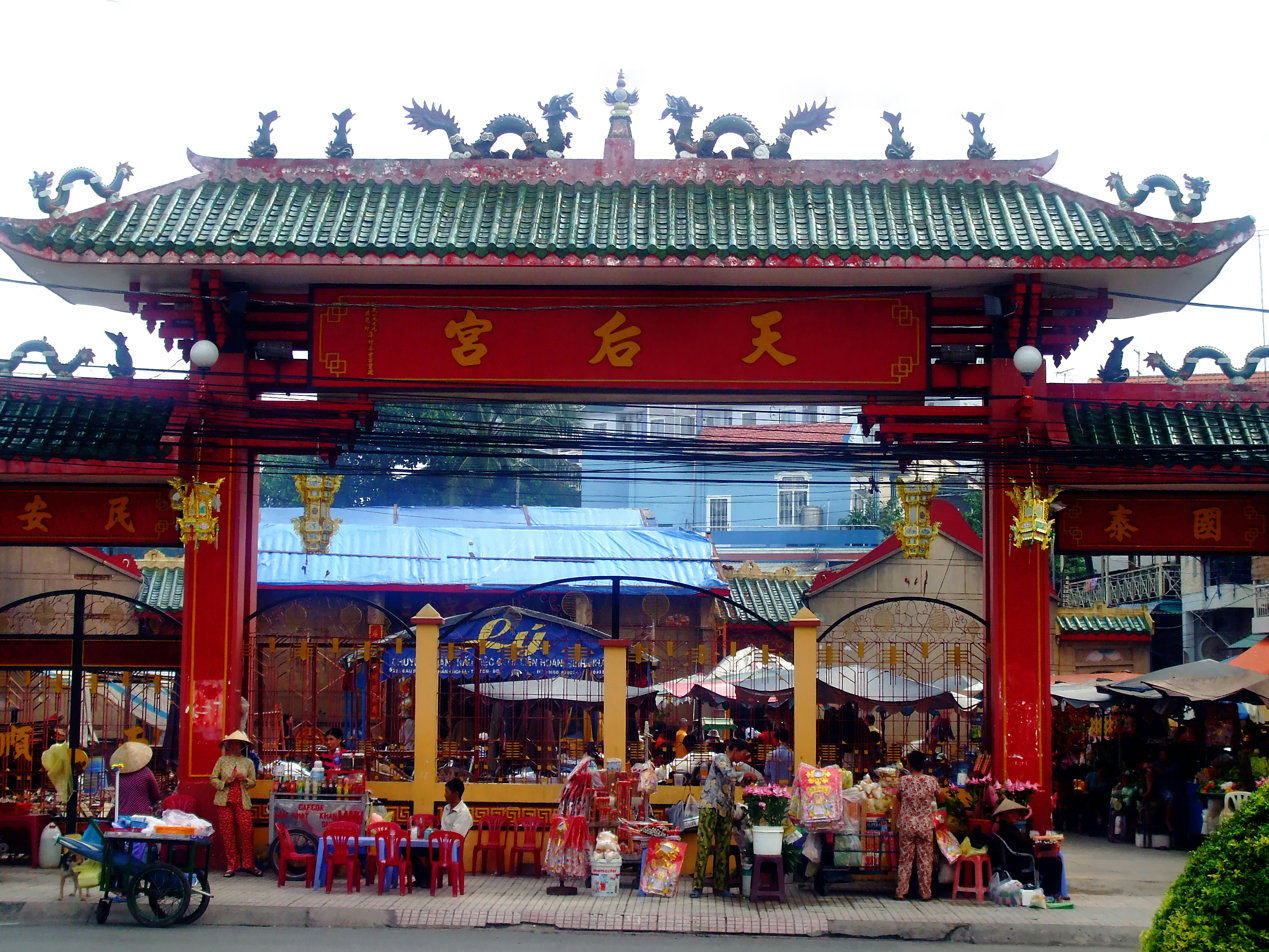
Lady Thiên Hậu Pagoda

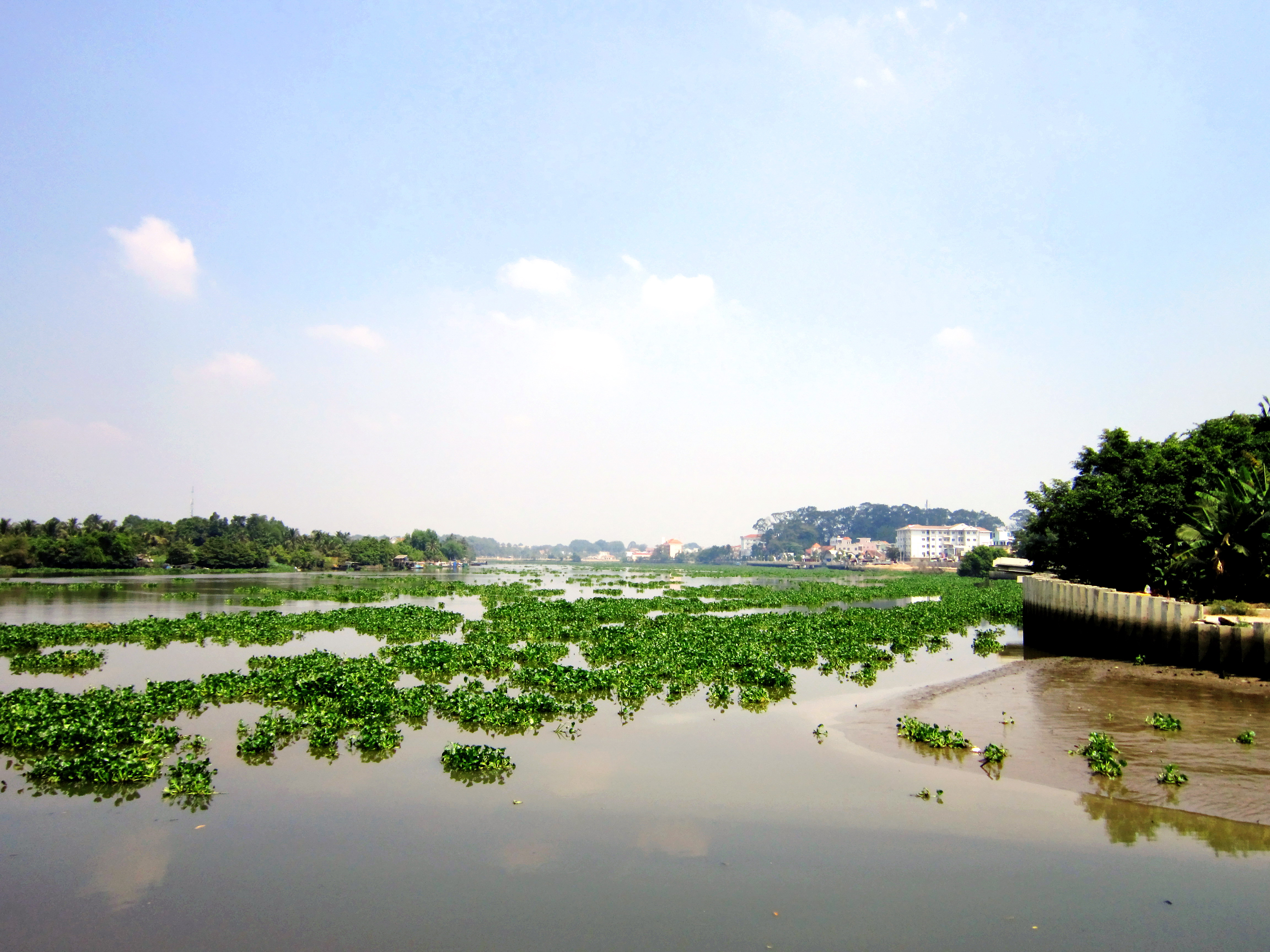
Saigon River in Thủ Dầu Một

- First Full Moon of the New Year Festival (also called Lady Thiên Hậu Pagoda Festival): On this occasion, thousands of visitors flocked into Thủ Dầu Một since the 13th of the first lunar month to celebrate Tết Nguyên Tiêu, the first full moon on the 15th day of the lunar calendar. During this festival, the pagoda attracts thousands of people each day who come to pray for luck, happiness and success. It is common to see people eating vegan food and drinking water. The First Full Moon of the New Year Festival in Bình Dương was more special than in other provinces and Ho Chi Minh City because local businesses and residents give visitors free food, water and motorbike repair services.
- Japanese Festival (held in Bình Dương New City)
- Ky Yen Festival (twice a year on 15 April and in Làyuè of lunar calendar)
- Ông Bổn Temple Festival (the second day of Zhēngyuè in lunar calendar in spring, and 4 July in lunar calendar in fall)
- Dragon Boat Rowing Festival on Saigon river (30 April, 1 May, or 2 September)
- Lái Thiêu Fruit Festival (Thuận An City)

== Transport ==
National Highway 13 originates in Ho Chi Minh City and stretches the entire length of Binh Phuoc province from south to north, connecting to Cambodia and onwards to the borders of Thailand and Laos.

=== Airway ===
As of 2011, Phú Lợi Airport and Phú Giáo Airport were the only two remaining airports in the province; however, both are used for military reserve purposes. Bình Dương is located 10 to 15 kilometers from Tân Sơn Nhất International Airport.

=== Rail transport ===
Binh Duong province is home to two railway stations along the North-South Railway line: Song Than station and Di An station. As of June 5, 2019, Di An station has become the main passenger station, replacing Song Than due to its convenient location near residential areas and industrial parks. Consequently, the railway sector has discontinued passenger services at Song Than station. Previously, Binh Duong province was also served by the Saigon - Loc Ninh railway line, which connected at Di An station and facilitated the transportation of rubber latex from Binh Phuoc province.

=== Becamex Tokyu Bus ===
The Becamex Tokyu Bus operates in the Bình Dương province, including Bình Dương New City.

== International relations ==
=== Sister cities ===
Bình Dương is twinned with:

- Daejon, South Korea (17 May 2005)

=== Cooperation and friendship ===
In addition to its twin city, Bình Dương cooperates with:

- Kratié, Cambodia
- Champasak, Laos (13 November 2006)
- Guangzhou, China (21 August 2013)
- Emilia-Romagna, Italy (16 October 2013)
- Yamaguchi Prefecture, Japan (25 December 2014)
- Eindhoven, Netherlands (16 January 2015)
- East Flanders, Belgium (14 October 2015)
- Emmen, Netherlands (17 November 2015)
- Oryol Oblast, Russia (7 July 2017)

== Gallery ==
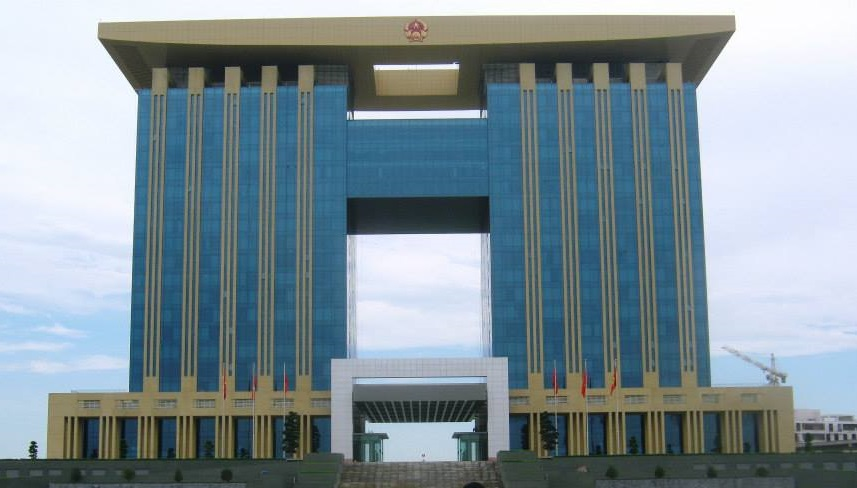
Administrative Center
of Bình Dương province

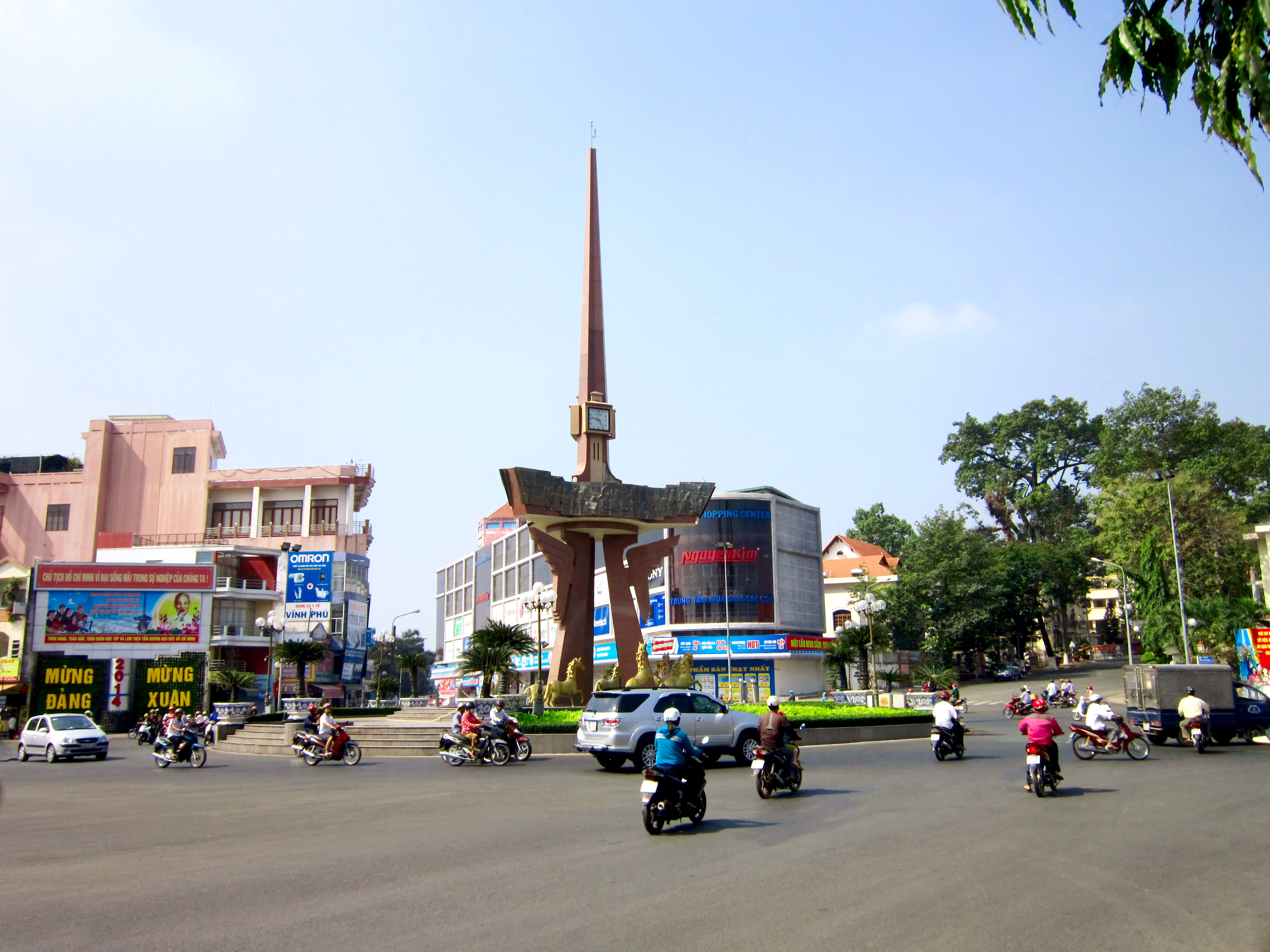
Six-way intersections
in Thủ Dầu Một

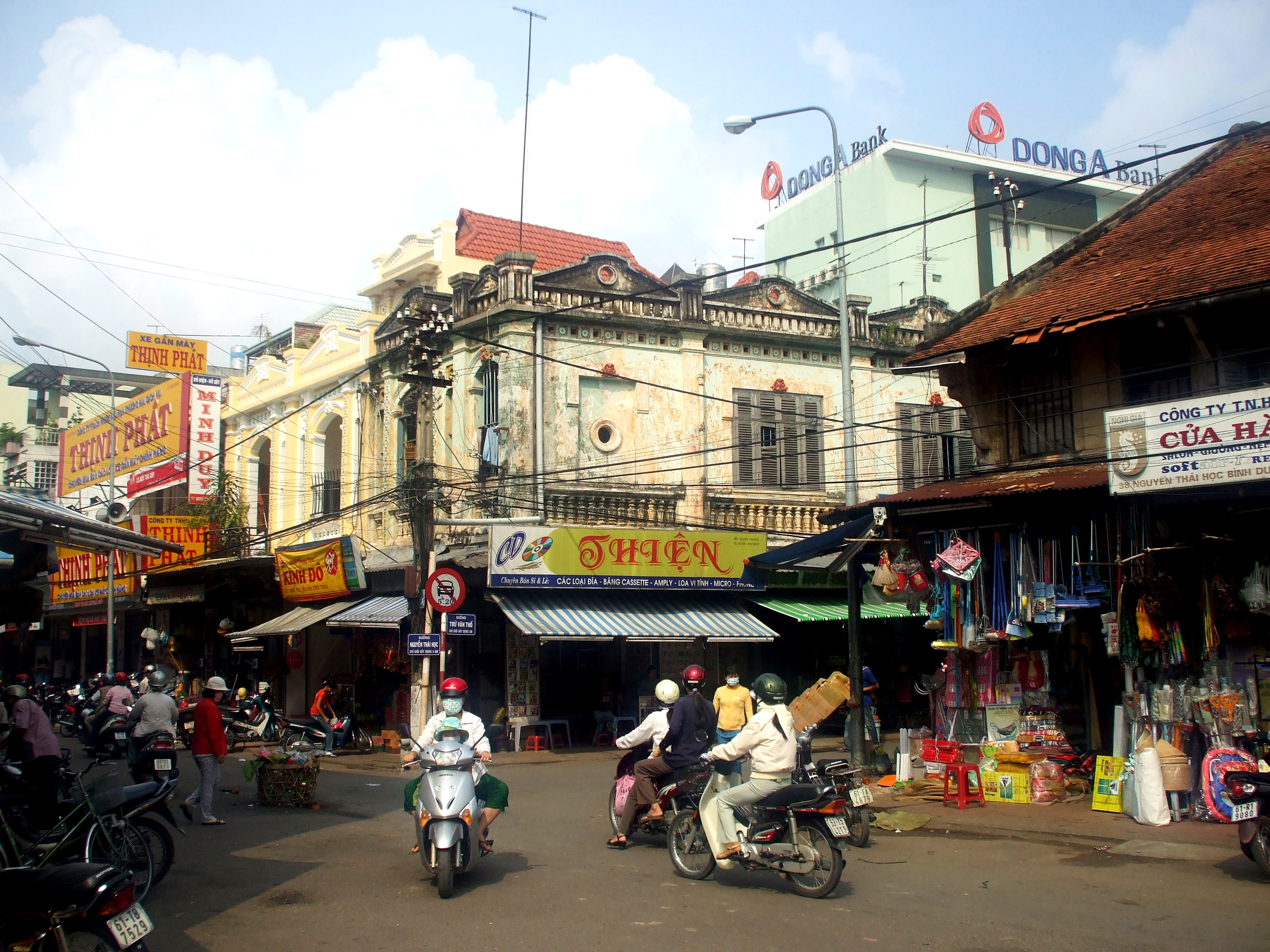
Thủ Dầu Một Market

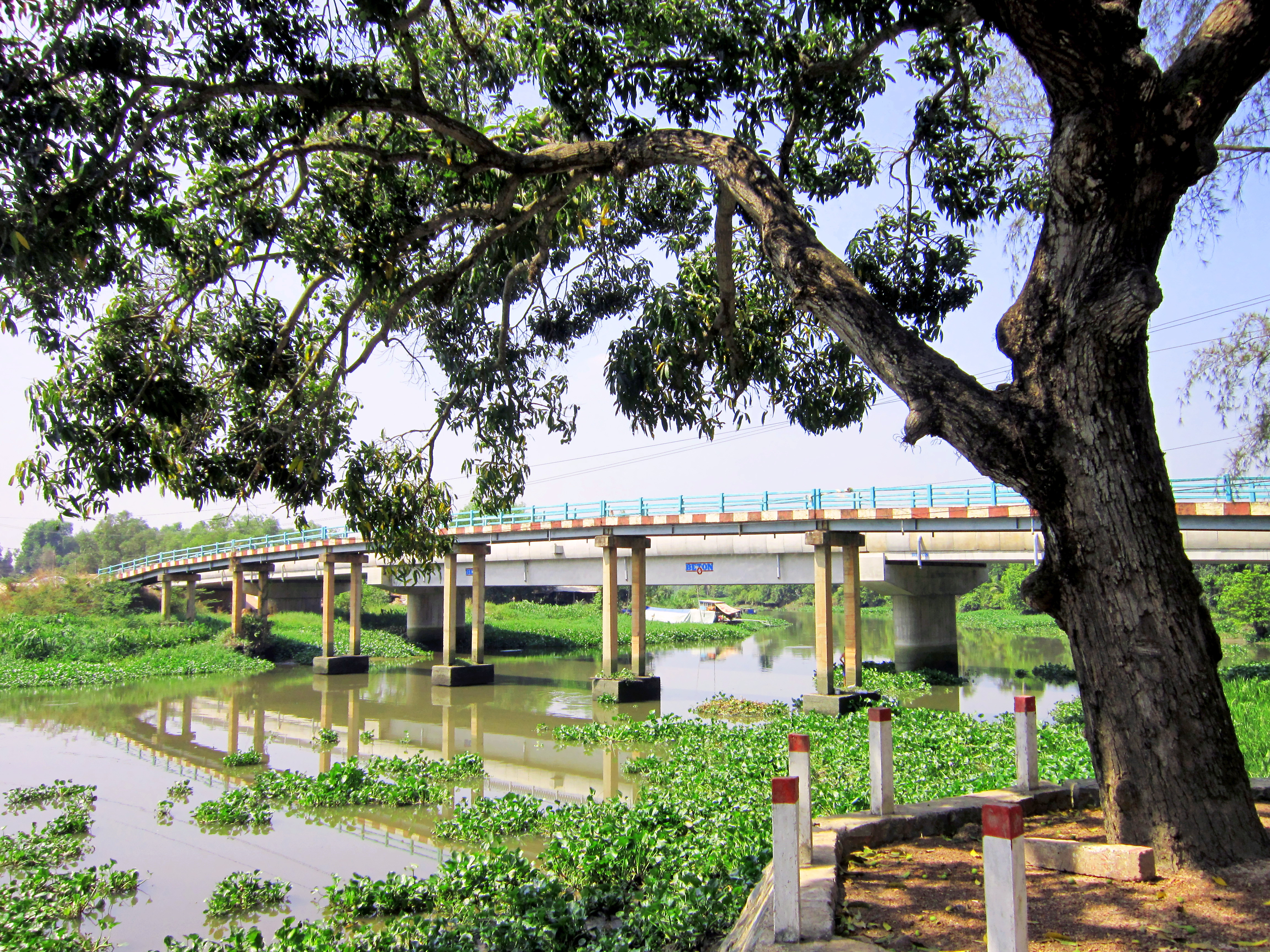
Bà Lụa Canal

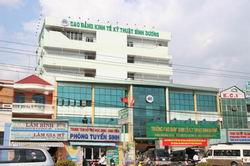
Bình Dương Economics and Technology University

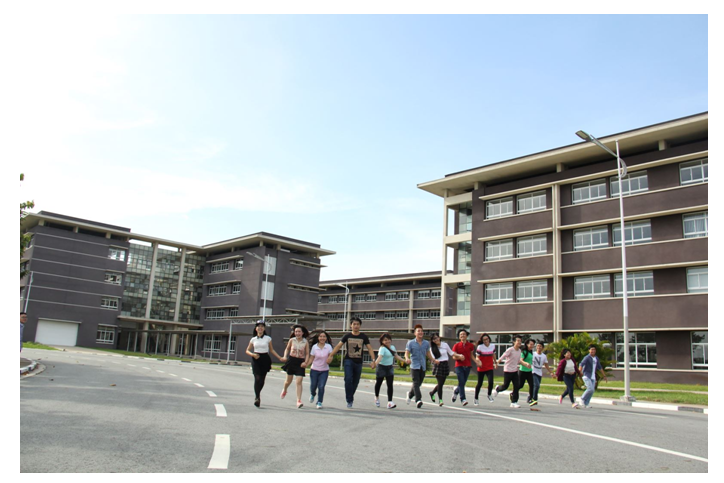
Eastern International University

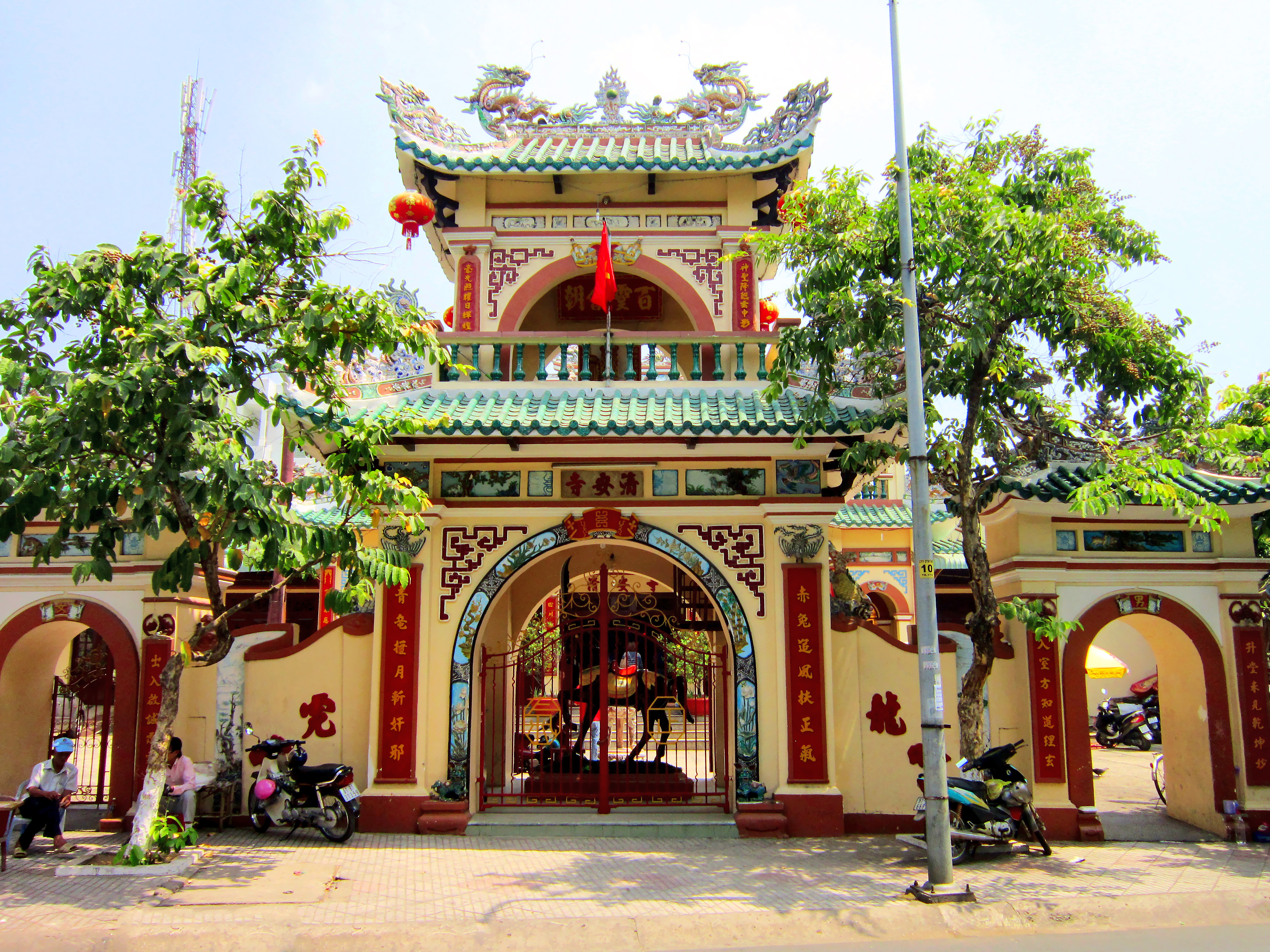
Ông Ngựa Pagoda

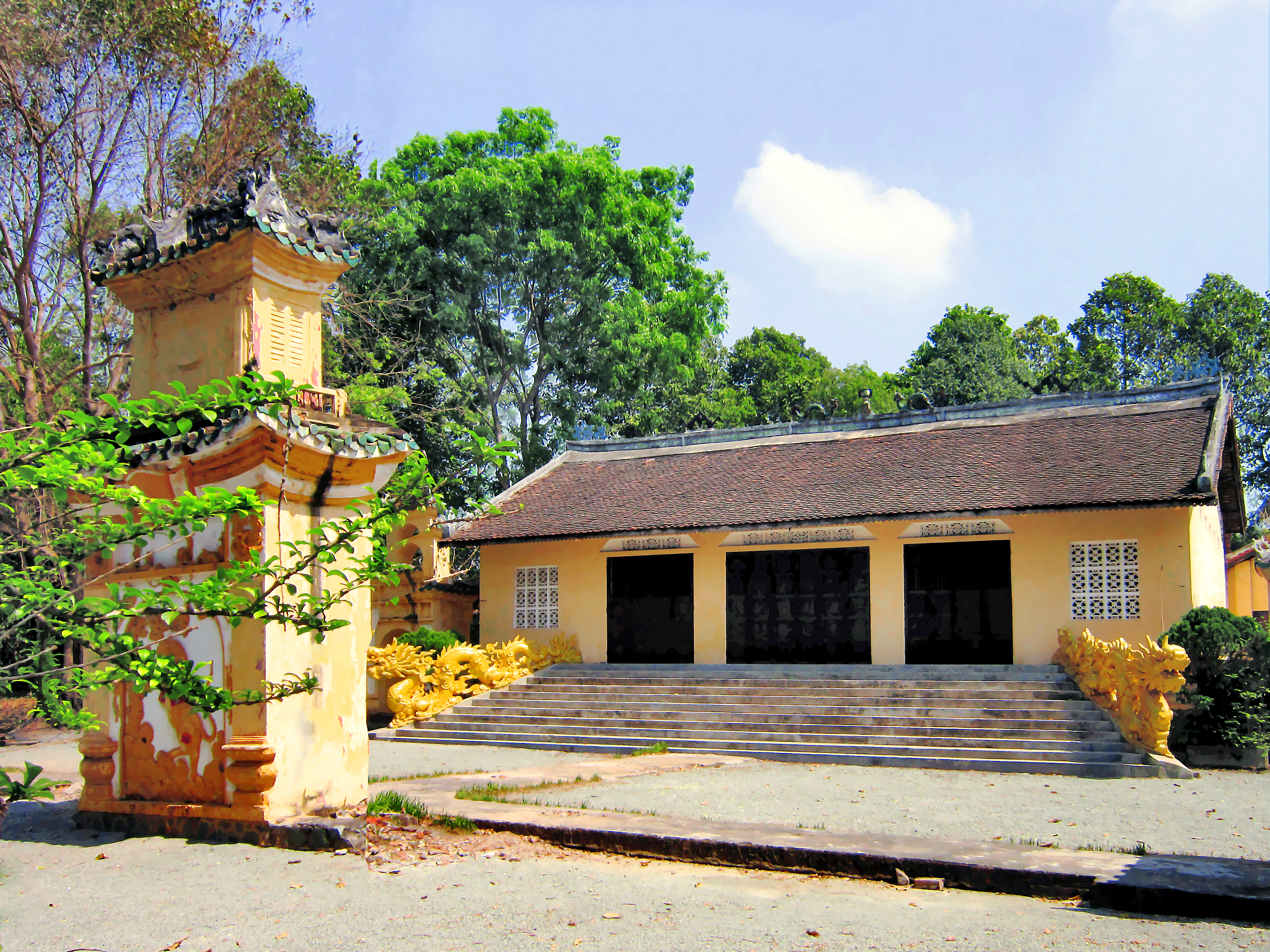
Phú Cường communal temple

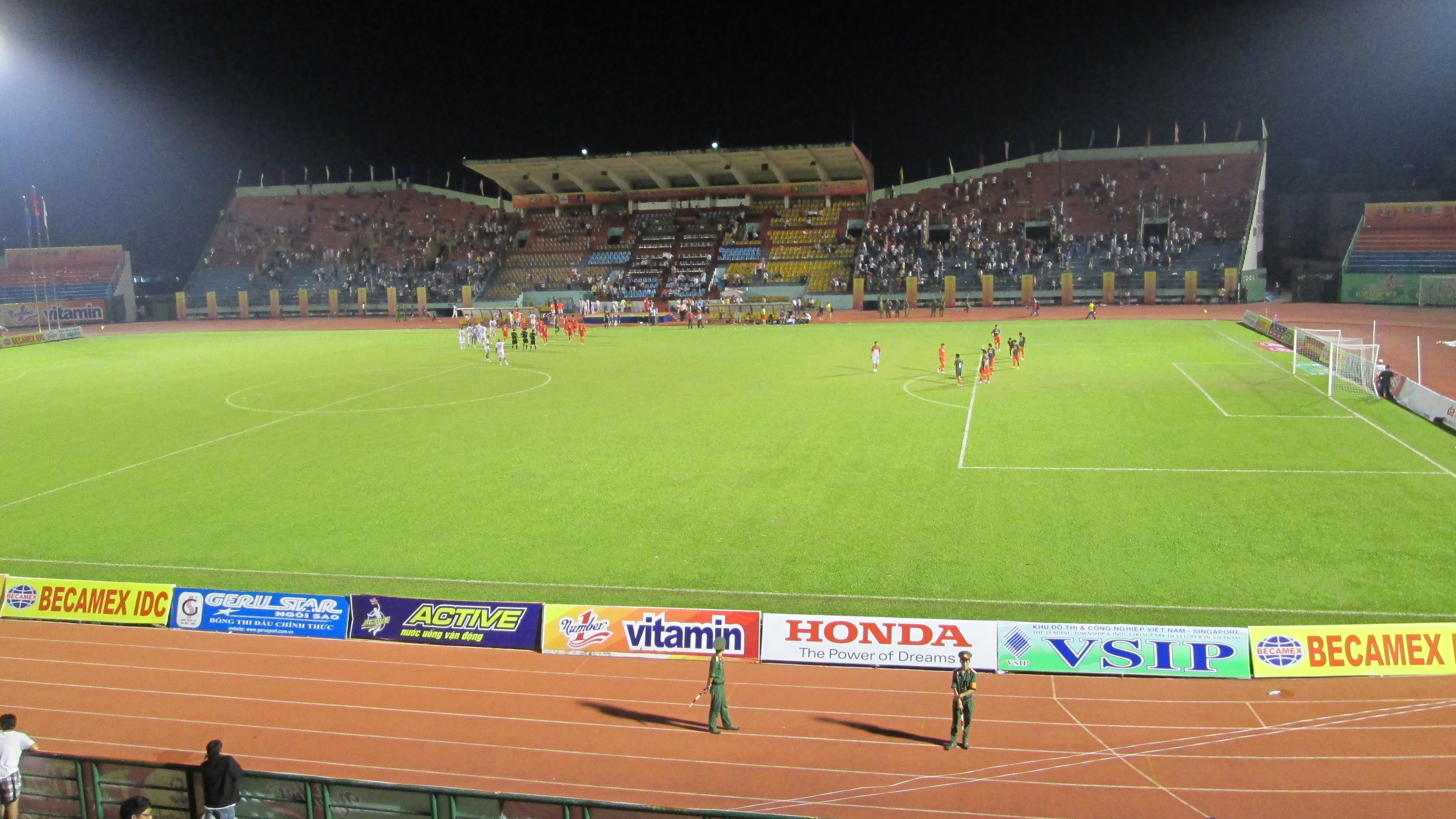
Gò Đậu Stadium

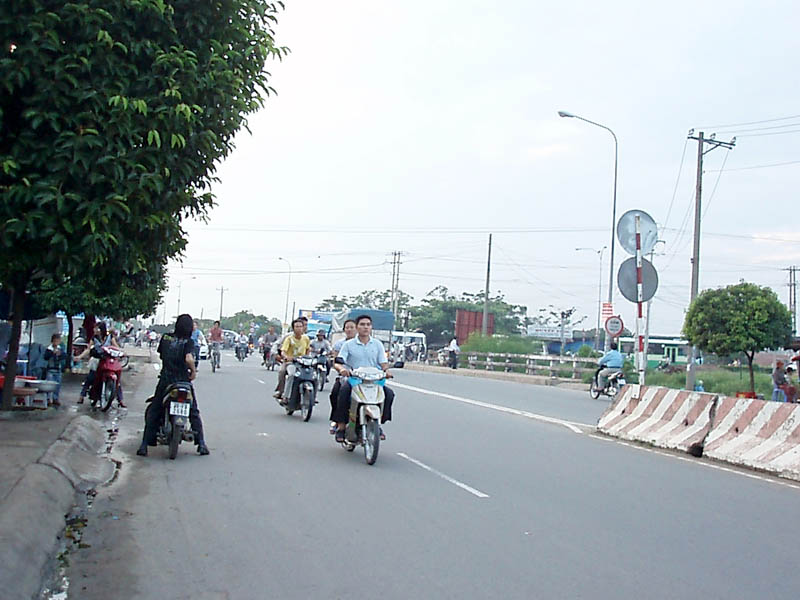
Lái Thiêu Street
Thuận An

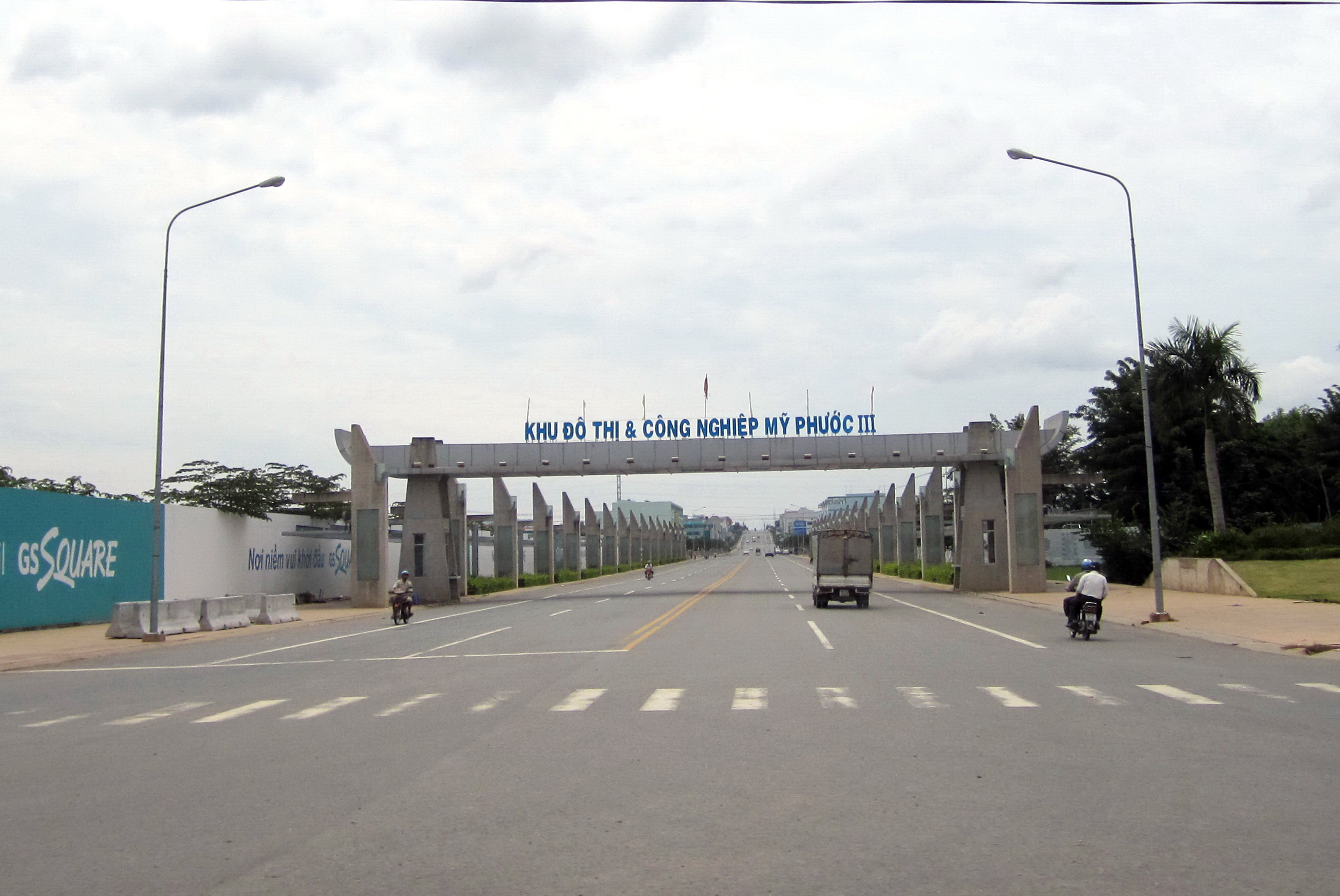
Mỹ Phước, Bến Cát industrial park

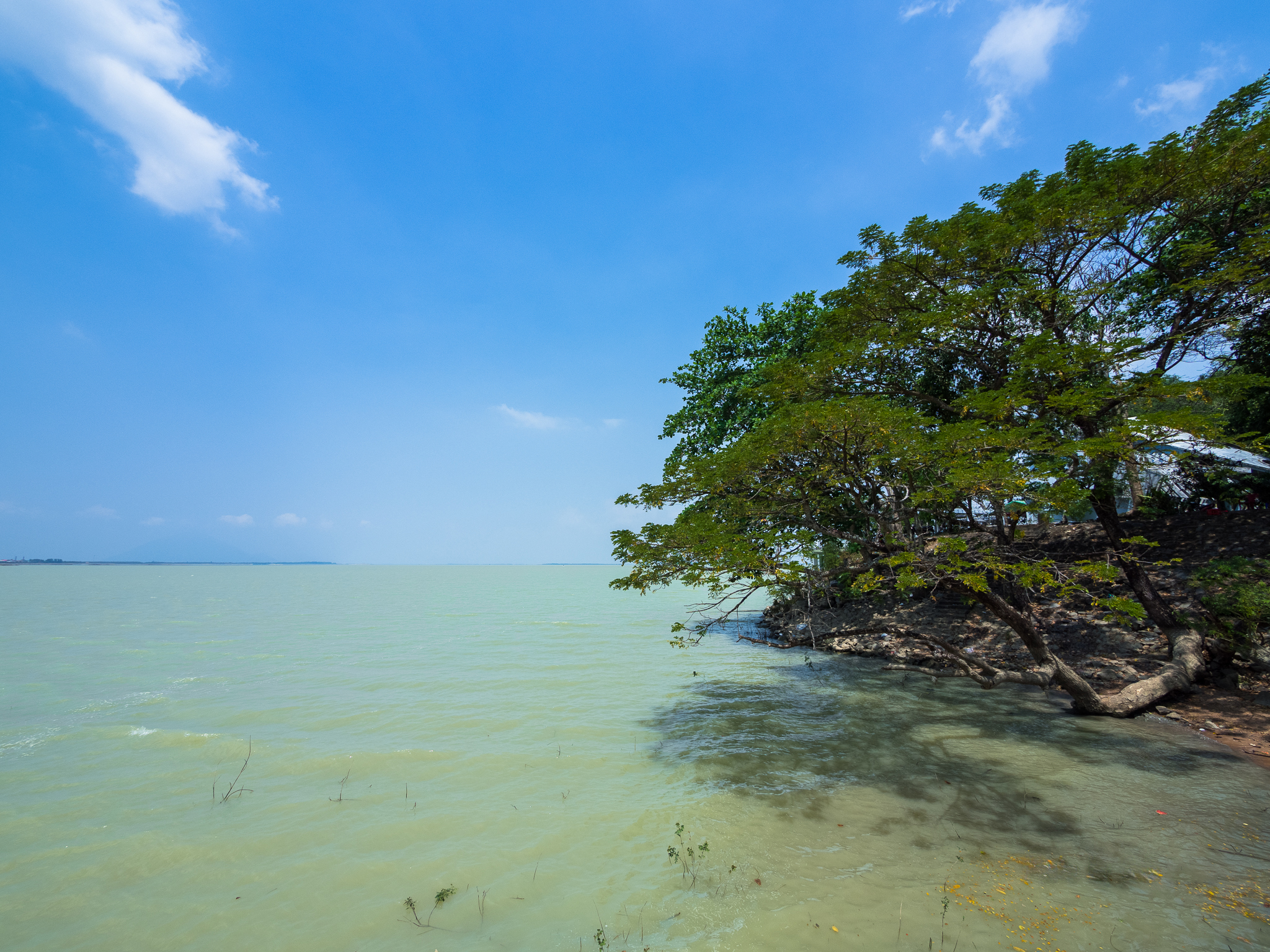
Dầu Tiếng Reservoir
