= Phú Lợi, Ho Chi Minh City =

Phú Lợi Phường Phú Lợi Phú Hòa
- Ward
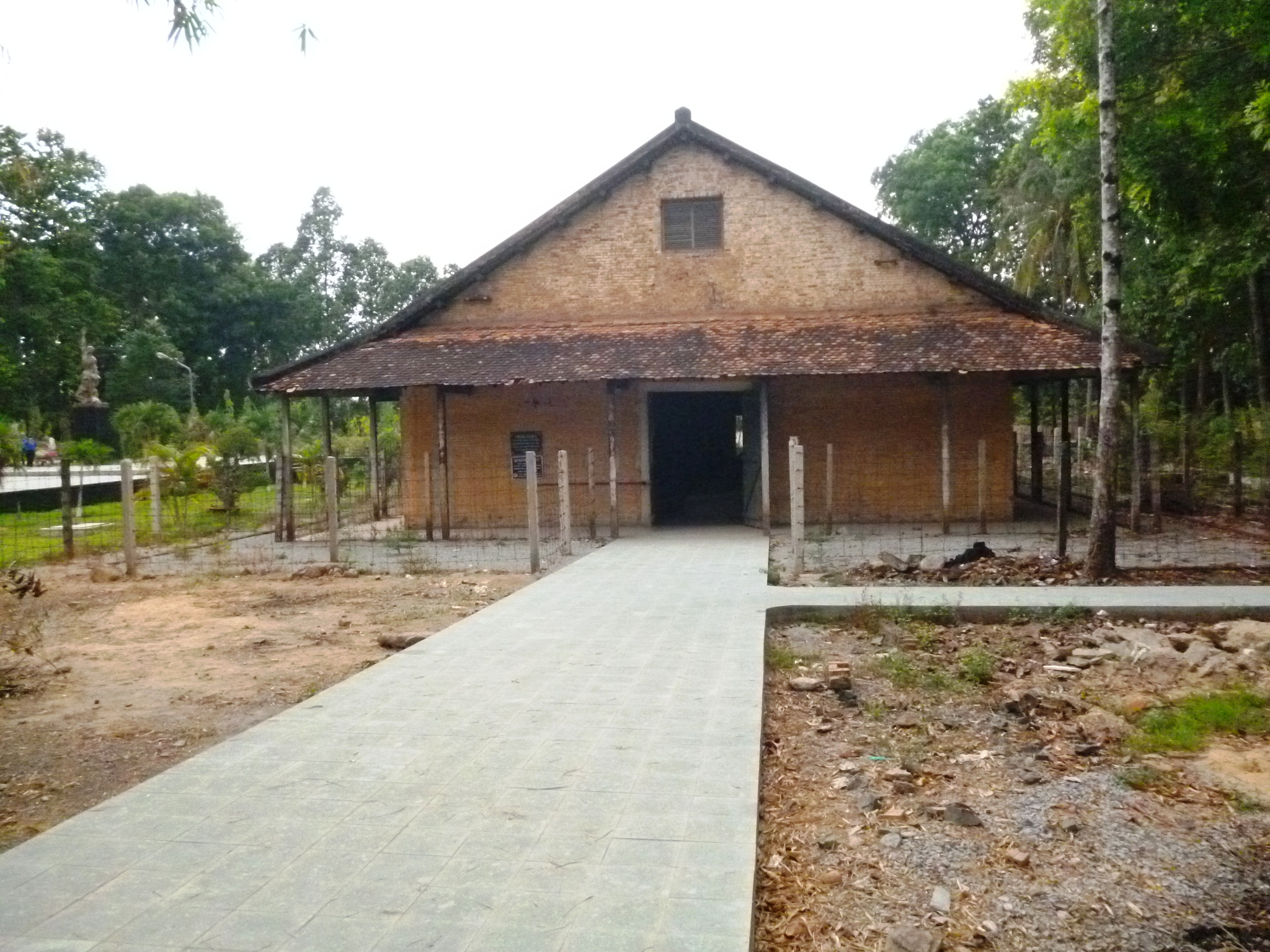
- Phú Lợi Prison
- Interactive map of Phú Lợi
- Coordinates: 10°59′26.5″N 106°40′26.6″E
- Country: Vietnam
- Municipality: Ho Chi Minh City
- Established: June 16, 2025

Area
  - Total: 6.93 sq mi (17.96 km^{2})

Population (2024)
  - Total: 107,721
  - Density: 15,530/sq mi (5,998/km^{2})
- Time zone: UTC+07:00 (Indochina Time)
- Administrative code: 25750

Phú Lợi (Vietnamese: Phường Phú Lợi) is a ward of Ho Chi Minh City, Vietnam. It is one of the 168 new wards, communes and special zones of the city following the reorganization in 2025.

== History ==
On June 16, 2025, the National Assembly Standing Committee issued Resolution No. 1685/NQ-UBTVQH15 on the arrangement of commune-level administrative units of Ho Chi Minh City in 2025 (effective from June 16, 2025). Accordingly, the entire land area and population of Phú Hòa, Phú Lợi wards and part of Hiệp Thành ward of the former Thủ Dầu Một city will be integrated into a new ward named Phú Lợi (Clause 88, Article 1).

== Landmarks ==
- Phu Loi prison
- Thu Dau Mot University
- Becamex Tower
- Coop mart Binh Duong Square
- Hàng Bông Market

== Galleries ==
Becamex Tower (230 Đại lộ Bình Dương, Phú Lợi, Hồ Chí Minh, Vietnam)

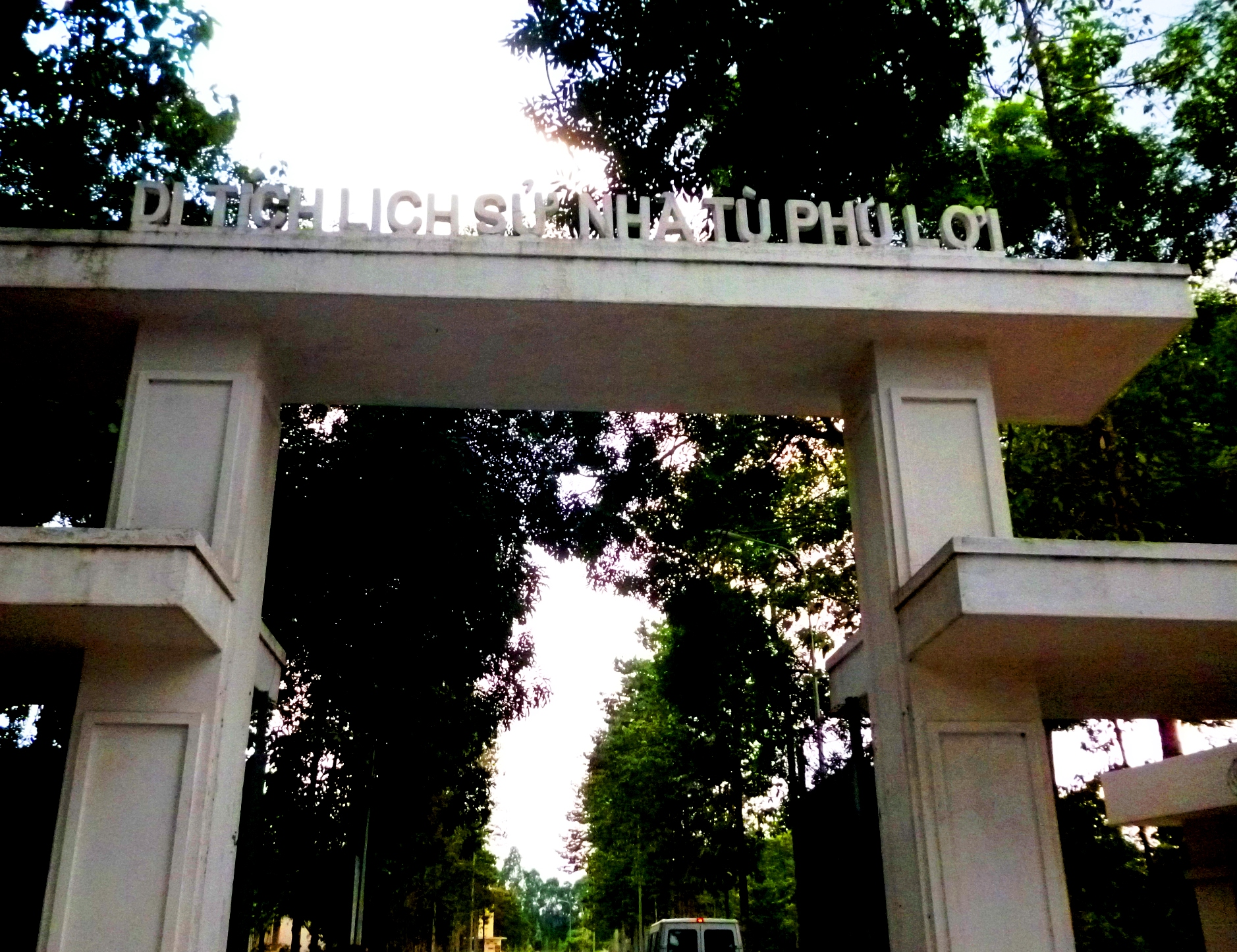
Phu Loi Base Camp's gate

Memorial building for victims of Phu Loi prison.

== See also ==
- Phu Loi Base Camp
