= Chánh Hiệp =

Chánh Hiệp Phường Chánh Hiệp Tương Bình Hiệp, Định Hòa
- Ward
- Interactive map of Chánh Hiệp
- Coordinates: 11°00′28″N 106°37′49″E
- Country: Vietnam
- Municipality: Ho Chi Minh City
- Established: June 16, 2025

Area
  - Total: 7.68 sq mi (19.89 km^{2})

Population (2024)
  - Total: 57,176
  - Density: 7,445/sq mi (2,875/km^{2})
- Time zone: UTC+07:00 (Indochina Time)
- Administrative code: 25771

Chánh Hiệp (Vietnamese: Phường Chánh Hiệp) is a ward of Ho Chi Minh City, Vietnam. It is one of the 168 new wards, communes and special zones of the city following the reorganization in 2025.

== History ==
On June 16, 2025, the National Assembly Standing Committee issued Resolution No. 1685/NQ-UBTVQH15 on the arrangement of commune-level administrative units of Ho Chi Minh City in 2025 (effective from June 16, 2025). Accordingly, the entire land area and population of Định Hòa, Tương Bình Hiệp wards and part of Hiệp An, Chánh Mỹ wards of the former Thủ Dầu Một city will be integrated into a new ward named Chánh Hiệp (Clause 89, Article 1).
