= Thủ Dầu Một, Ho Chi Minh City =

Ward of Thủ Dầu Một in Bình Dương Province, Vietnam

Thủ Dầu Một Phường Thủ Dầu Một Phú Cường
- Ward
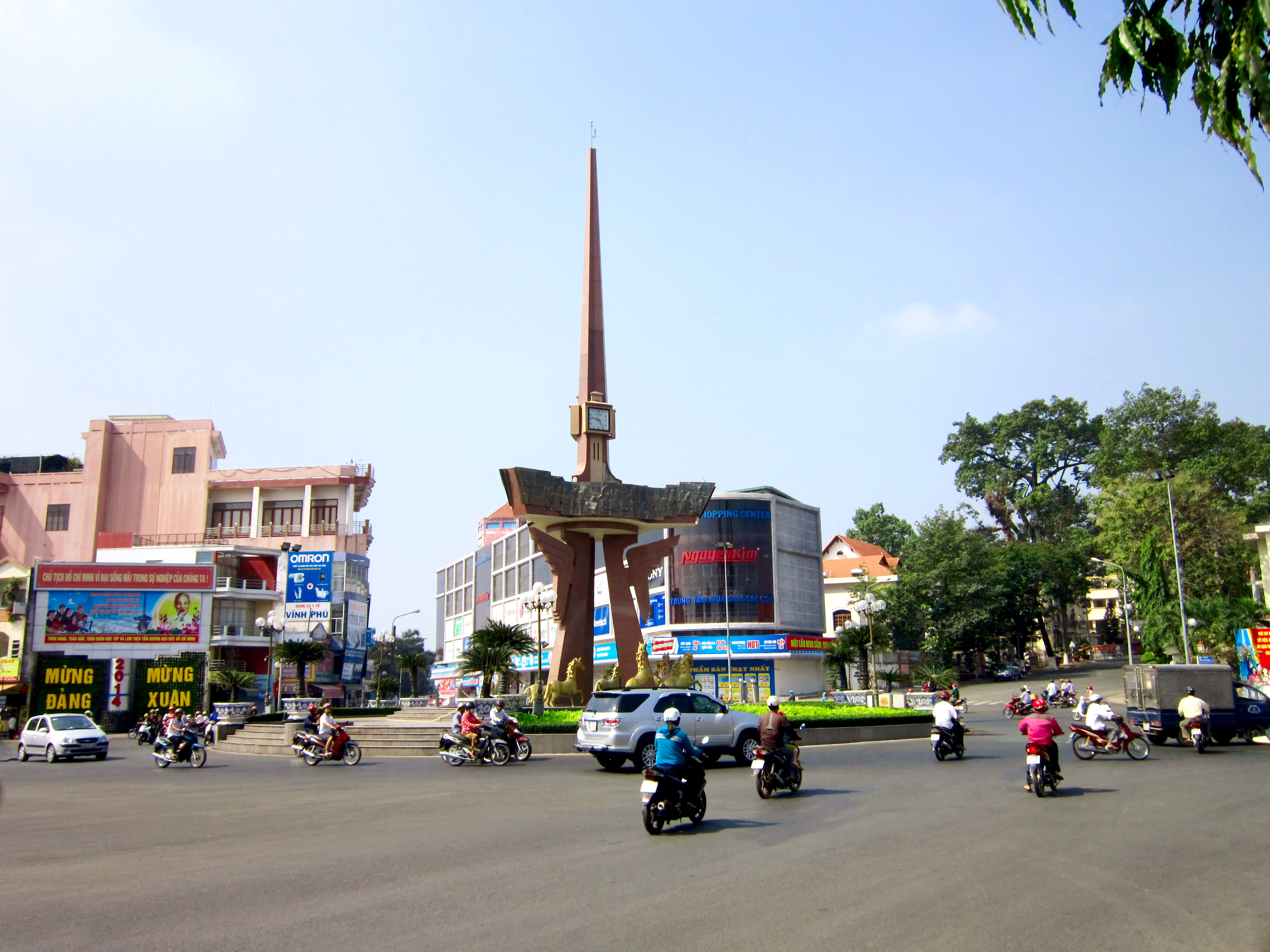
- Clock tower in downtown Thủ Dầu Một
- Interactive map of Thủ Dầu Một
- Coordinates: 10°58′51″N 106°39′17″E
- Country: Vietnam
- Municipality: Ho Chi Minh City
- Established: June 16, 2025

Area
  - Total: 6.05 sq mi (15.68 km^{2})

Population (2024)
  - Total: 88,132
  - Density: 14,560/sq mi (5,621/km^{2})
- Time zone: UTC+07:00 (Indochina Time)
- Administrative code: 25747

Thủ Dầu Một (Vietnamese: Phường Thủ Dầu Một) is a ward of Ho Chi Minh City, Vietnam. It is one of the 168 new wards, communes and special zones of the city following the reorganization in 2025.

== Geography ==
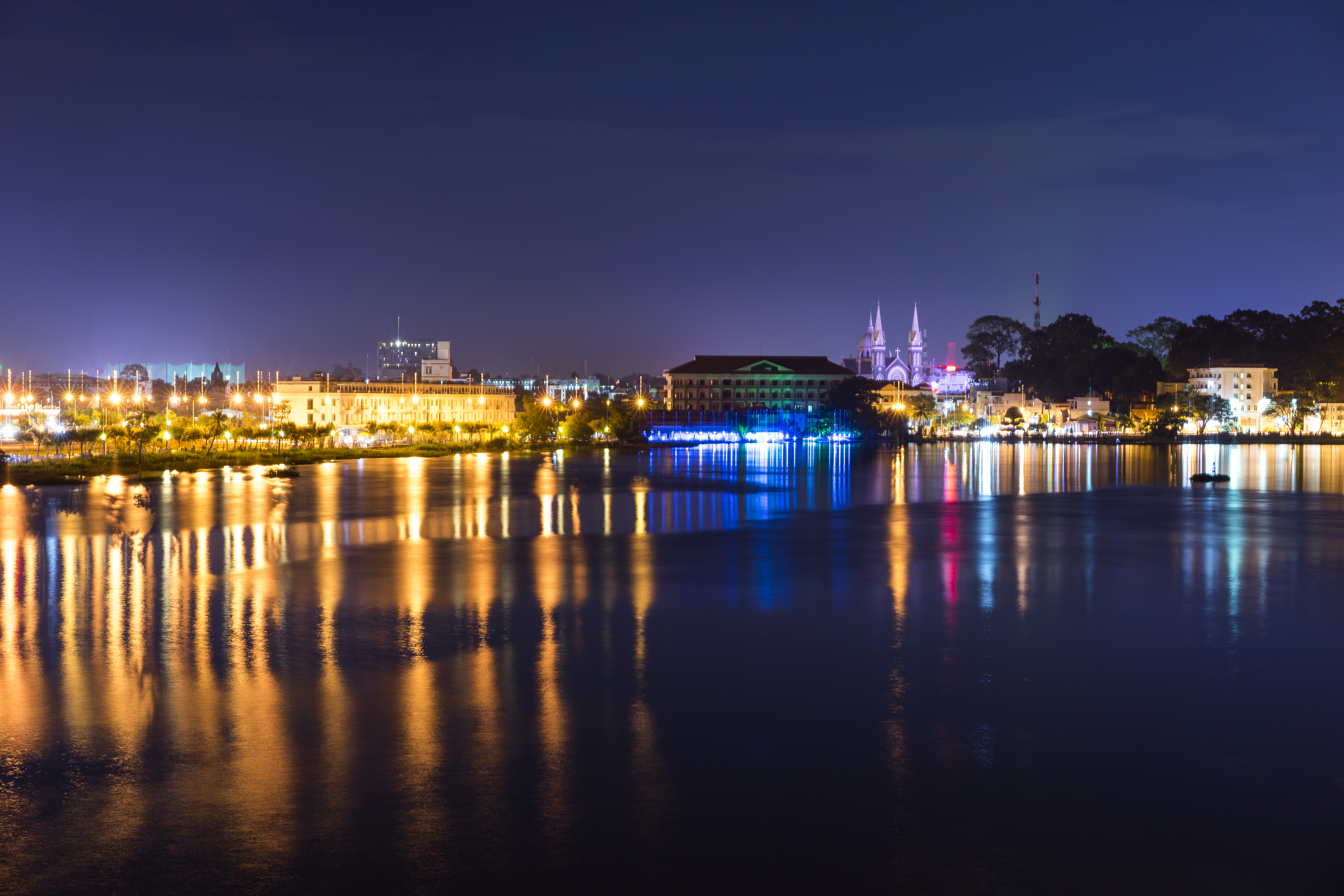
Bạch Đằng Pier, Thủ Dầu Một, viewed from Phú Cường Bridge, across Saigon River and connect with Bình Mỹ

Thủ Dầu Một located in northern Ho Chi Minh City, about 8 km to the south of Bình Dương and 30 km away to the north of Sài Gòn. This ward is part of the centre of Bình Dương Region (also known Region 2) of Ho Chi Minh City and adjacented to:

- Bình Mỹ to the west by Saigon River
- Chánh Hiệp to the north
- Phú Lợi to the east by Bình Dương Avenue
- Thuận An to the south mostly by Bà Lụa Canal.

According to Official Dispatch No. 2896/BNV-CQĐP dated May 27, 2025 of the Ministry of Home Affairs, following the merger, Thủ Dầu Một ward has a land area of 15.68 km², the population is 88,132 people, the population density is 5,620 người/km² (statistical data as of December 31, 2024, in accordance with Article 6 of Resolution No. 76/2025/UBTVQH15 dated April 14, 2025, of the National Assembly Standing Committee).

== Division ==
Thủ Dầu Một ward is divided into 40 quarters: Chánh Lộc 1, Chánh Lộc 2, Chánh Lộc 7, Chánh Nghĩa 1, Chánh Nghĩa 2, Chánh Nghĩa 3, Chánh Nghĩa 4, Chánh Nghĩa 5, Chánh Nghĩa 6, Chánh Nghĩa 7, Chánh Nghĩa 8, Chánh Nghĩa 9, Chánh Nghĩa 10, Chánh Nghĩa 11, Chánh Nghĩa 12, Hiệp Thành 1, Hiệp Thành 2, Hiệp Thành 3, Hiệp Thành 4, Phú Cường 1, Phú Cường 2, Phú Cường 3, Phú Cường 4, Phú Cường 5, Phú Cường 6, Phú Cường 7, Phú Cường 8, Phú Cường 9, Phú Cường 10, Phú Cường 11, Phú Cường 12, Phú Cường 13, Phú Cường 14, Phú Thọ 2, Phú Thọ 3, Phú Thọ 4, Phú Thọ 5, Phú Thọ 6, Phú Thọ 7, Phú Thọ 8.

The quarters the ward are named by combining the place names of the former ward-level administrative units with sequential numbers, corresponding to the numbered quarters of those former wards.

== History ==
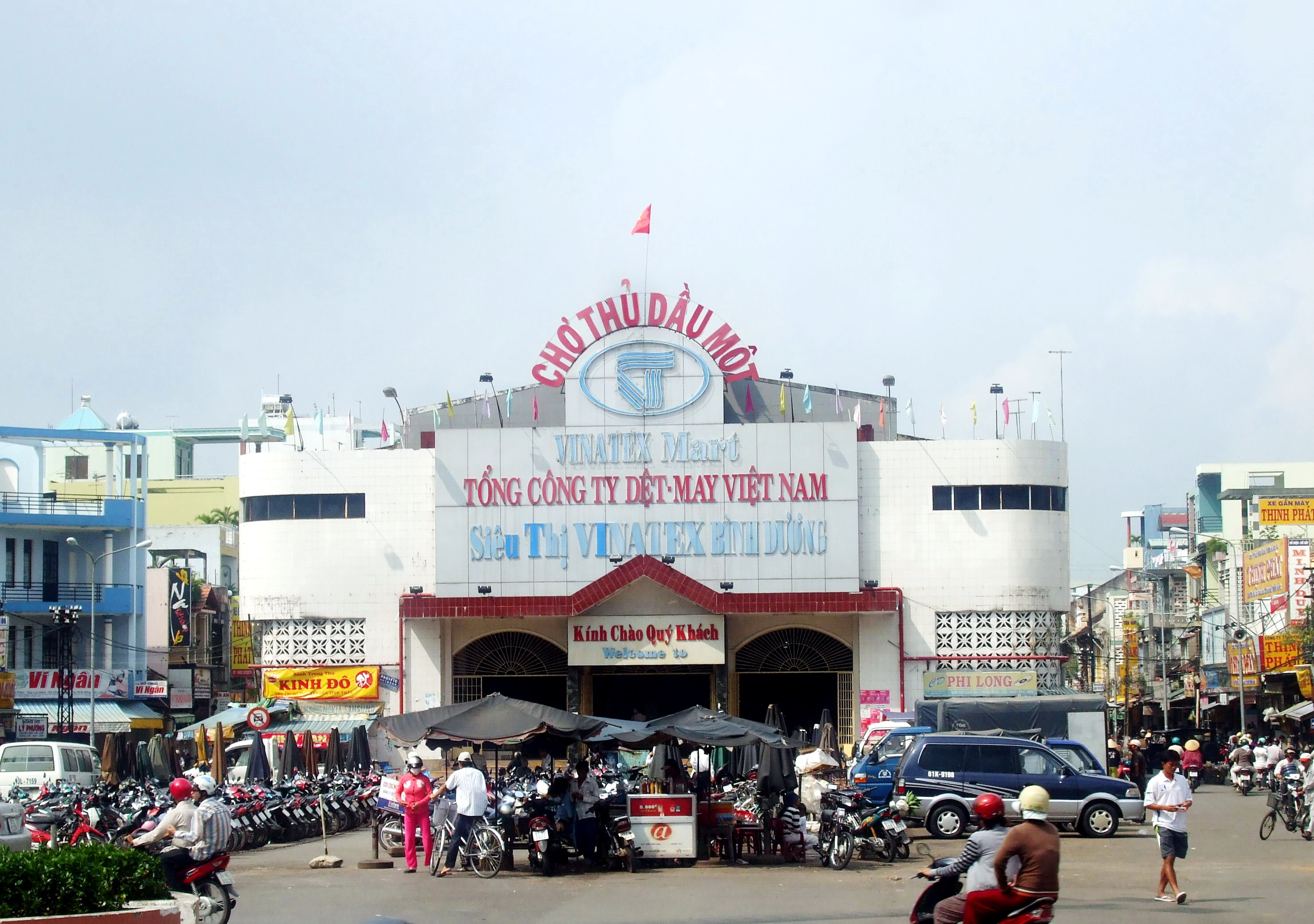
Thủ Dầu Một Market

Thủ Dầu Một ward was the historic downtown of the former Thủ Dầu Một city. In the early 20th century, it served as the capital of French Indochina's Thủ Dầu Một province. In 1956, Thủ Dầu Một province was renamed Bình Dương province, and the capital was also renamed Phú Cường by the Republic of Vietnam Government. After 1975, Thủ Dầu Một became the provincial capital of Sông Bé province, and then Bình Dương province during 1997–2025. In 2014, the seat of the province was relocated to the "Bình Dương New City" (Thành phố mới Bình Dương), about 6 miles northeast of downtown Thủ Dầu Một.

In June 2025, according to the Resolution No. 202/2025/QH15 approved by the National Assembly of Vietnam, Bình Dương province was incorporated into Ho Chi Minh City. As a result, Thủ Dầu Một lost its status as the provincial capital after more than a century.

On June 16, 2025, the National Assembly Standing Committee issued Resolution No. 1685/NQ-UBTVQH15 on the arrangement of commune-level administrative units of Ho Chi Minh City in 2025 (effective from June 16, 2025). Accordingly, the entire land area and population of Phú Cường, Phú Thọ, Chánh Nghĩa wards and part of Hiệp Thành, Chánh Mỹ wards of the former Thủ Dầu Một city will be integrated into a new ward named Thủ Dầu Một (Clause 87, Article 1).

== Religious sites ==
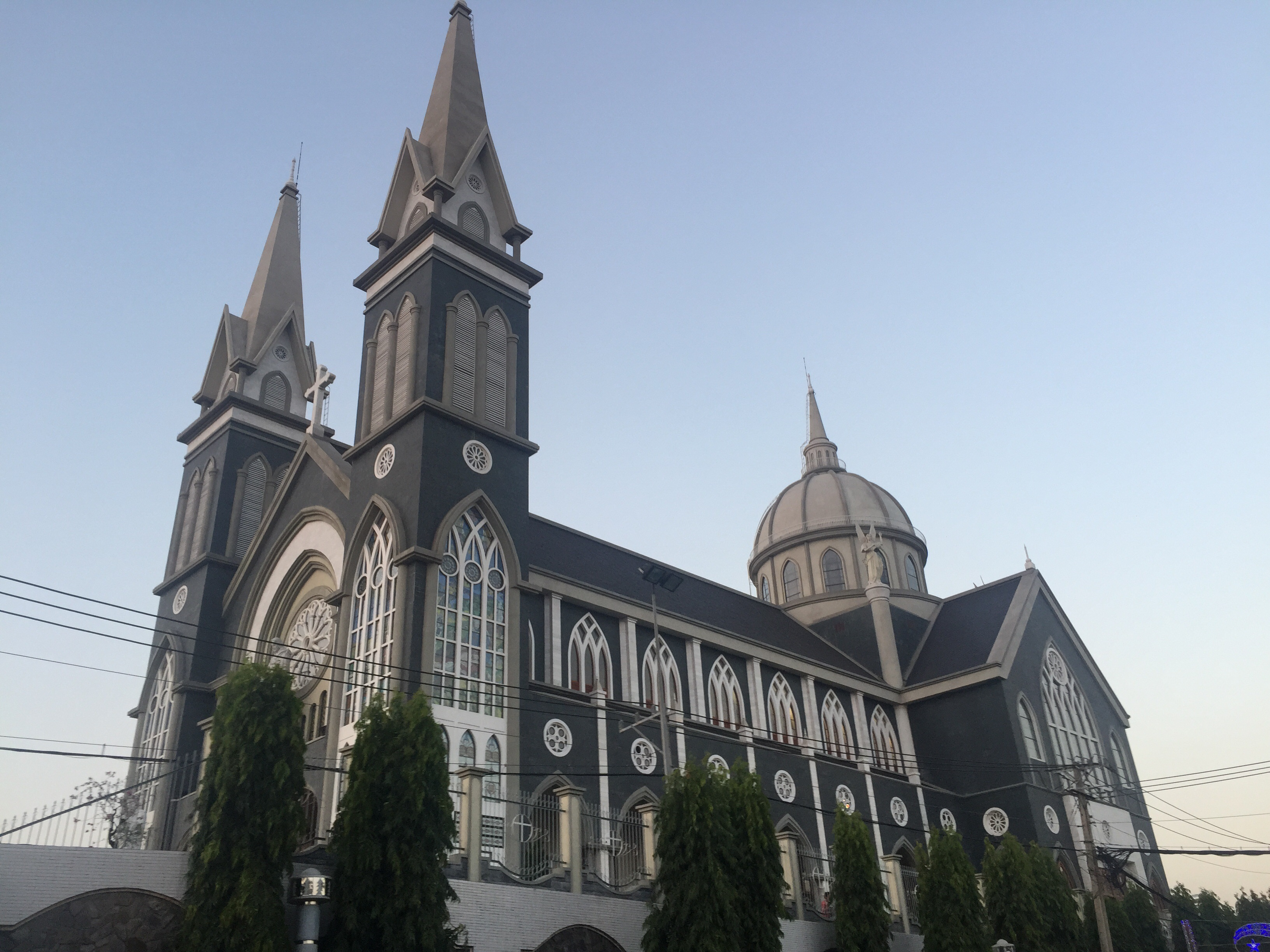
Phú Cường Cathedral

- Hội Khánh Temple
- Tây Tạng Buddhist Temple
- Thiên Hậu Temple of Phú Cường
- Phú Cường Cathedral – Church of the Sacred Heart (Diocese of Phú Cường)
