= Hội Khánh Temple =

Buddhist temple in Vietnam

- Vietnamese: Chùa Hội Khánh, Chữ Hán: 會慶寺
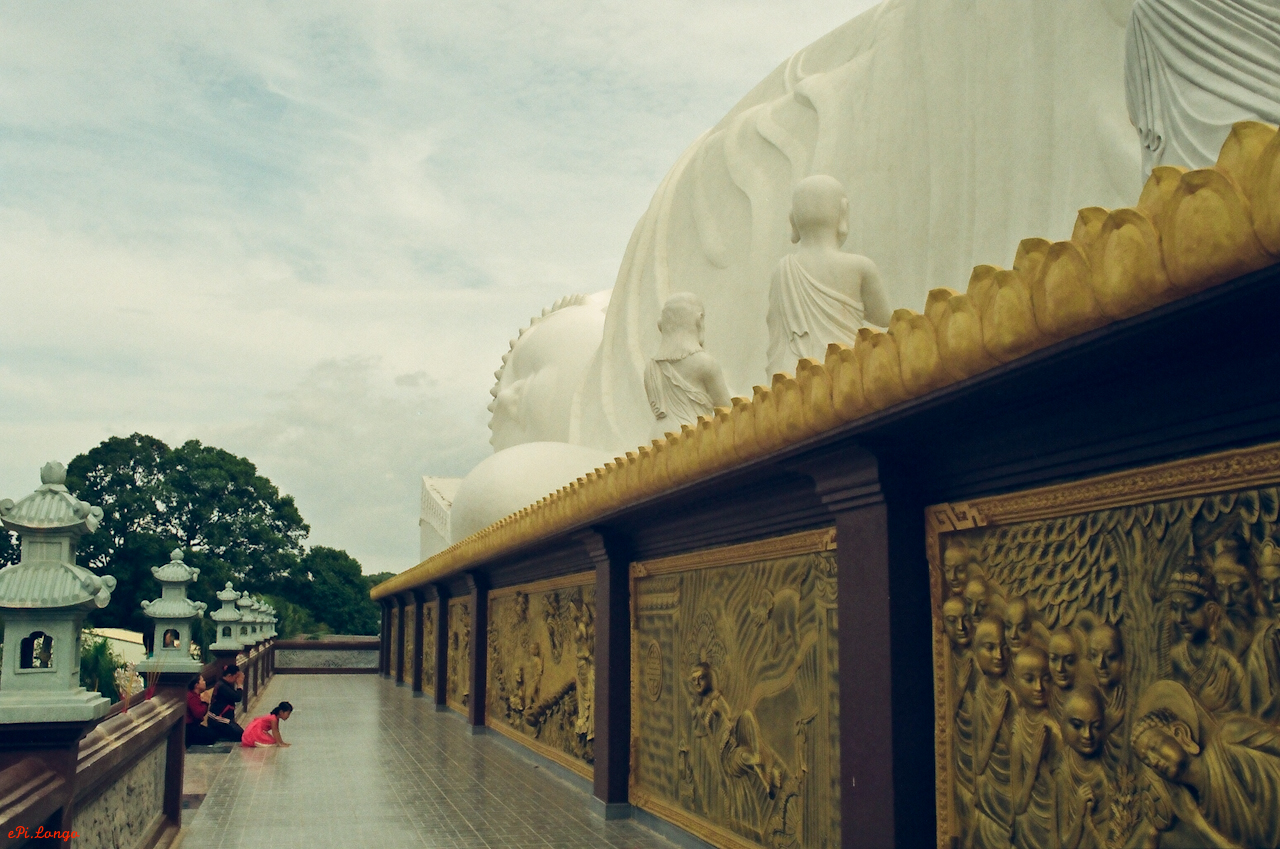
- Reclining Buddha at Hội Khánh Temple

- Location within Vietnam

Religion
- Prefecture: Bình Dương Province

Location
- Location: 35 Yersin Street, Phú Cường, Thủ Dầu Một
- Municipality: Ho Chi Minh City (since July 2025)
- Country: Vietnam
- Interactive map of Hội Khánh Temple
- Prefecture: Bình Dương Province
- Coordinates: 10°58′52″N 106°39′35″E

Architecture
- Style: Vietnamese
- Completed: 1741

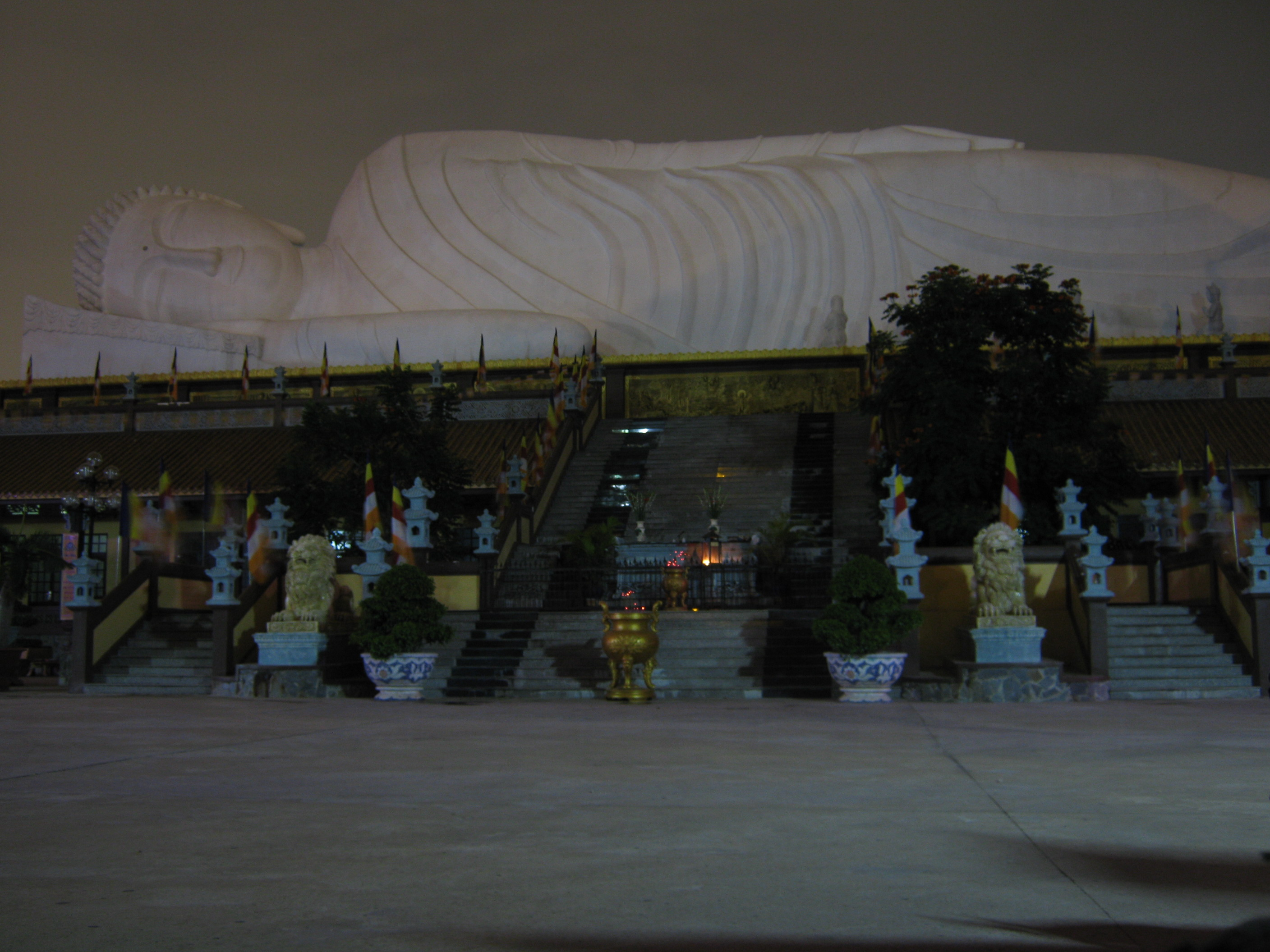
Statue of Buddha seen at night (photo by Gary Cycles)

Hội Khánh Temple (Vietnamese: Chùa Hội Khánh, Chữ Hán: 會慶寺) is an historic Buddhist temple built in 1741 in the city of Thủ Dầu Một, Bình Dương Province in southern Vietnam.

The temple was initially built on a prominent hill, but in 1861 it was destroyed in fighting as the French colonial army underwent the process of colonising southern Vietnam. The temple was rebuilt by Thích Chánh Đắc at the foot of the hill, around 100 m south of the original site. The temple currently is located at 35 Yersin Street, in Phú Cường ward, in the downtown of Thủ Dầu Một, central of Bình Dương.

== Geography ==
The temple is located only 150 m away from the road. Beyond the triple gates inscribed with depictions of dragons and phoenixes, the temple lies on a quiet plot of land, with many trees, in particular, four eucalyptus trees more than a century old that were planted shortly after the temple was rebuilt.

The temple has been refurbished and expanded many times, but retains its old-fashioned architecture.

The preaching hall and the eastern sanctuary were rebuilt in 1917, and the western sanctuary was rebuilt in 1984. The main ceremonial hall was rebuilt in 1990–1991. On February 29, 1992, the Board of the Buddhist Association of Song Be Province organised the restoration of the historical statues of the temple. The total built-up area occupied by the main hall, preaching hall, western and eastern sanctuary of the temple is 700 square metres. In the main hall are statues of Gautama Buddha, Ksitigarbha and other bodhisattvas, all made of wood with a golden paint exterior. There are statues of 18 arahants around the main hall. The wooden statues were carved in the late 19th century by local craftsmen from Thủ Dầu Một.

Over the more than 250 years of its existence, ten abbots have presided over the temple. The cremated remains of the nine past abbots have been enshrined in stupas on the temple grounds. These are Thích Đại Ngạn, Thích Chân Kính, Thích Chánh Đắc, Thích Trí Tập, Thích Thiện Quới, Thích Từ Văn, Thích Ấn Bửu - Thiện Quới, Thích Thiện Hương and Thích Quảng Viên. The current abbot is Thích Huệ Thông, who is also the current Secretary-General of the provincial Buddhist association.

Hội Khánh temple has long been a centre of Buddhist scholarship in the region. Many of the monks trained at the temple have gone on to open and preside over other temples in the area.

== Notable monks ==
One notable monk to have come from Hội Khánh was Thích Từ Văn who was regarded as the leading monk of his time from southern Vietnam. In 1920, he was invited to Marseille, France to give talks on the dharma. His efforts were instrumental in the setting up of Hoi Khanh Temple in Marseille.

From 1923 to 1926, a group of anti-colonial activists who advocated Vietnamese independence from France, met at the temple. One of the activists was Nguyễn Sinh Sắc, the father of Ho Chi Minh.

The temple is currently the headquarters of the provincial Buddhist association and has been listed by the Vietnamese government as having heritage value on the grounds of being significant in national culture.
