= Thien Hau Temple of Phú Cường =

Mazu temple in Binh Duong, Vietnam

Coordinates: 10°58′51″N 106°39′17″E

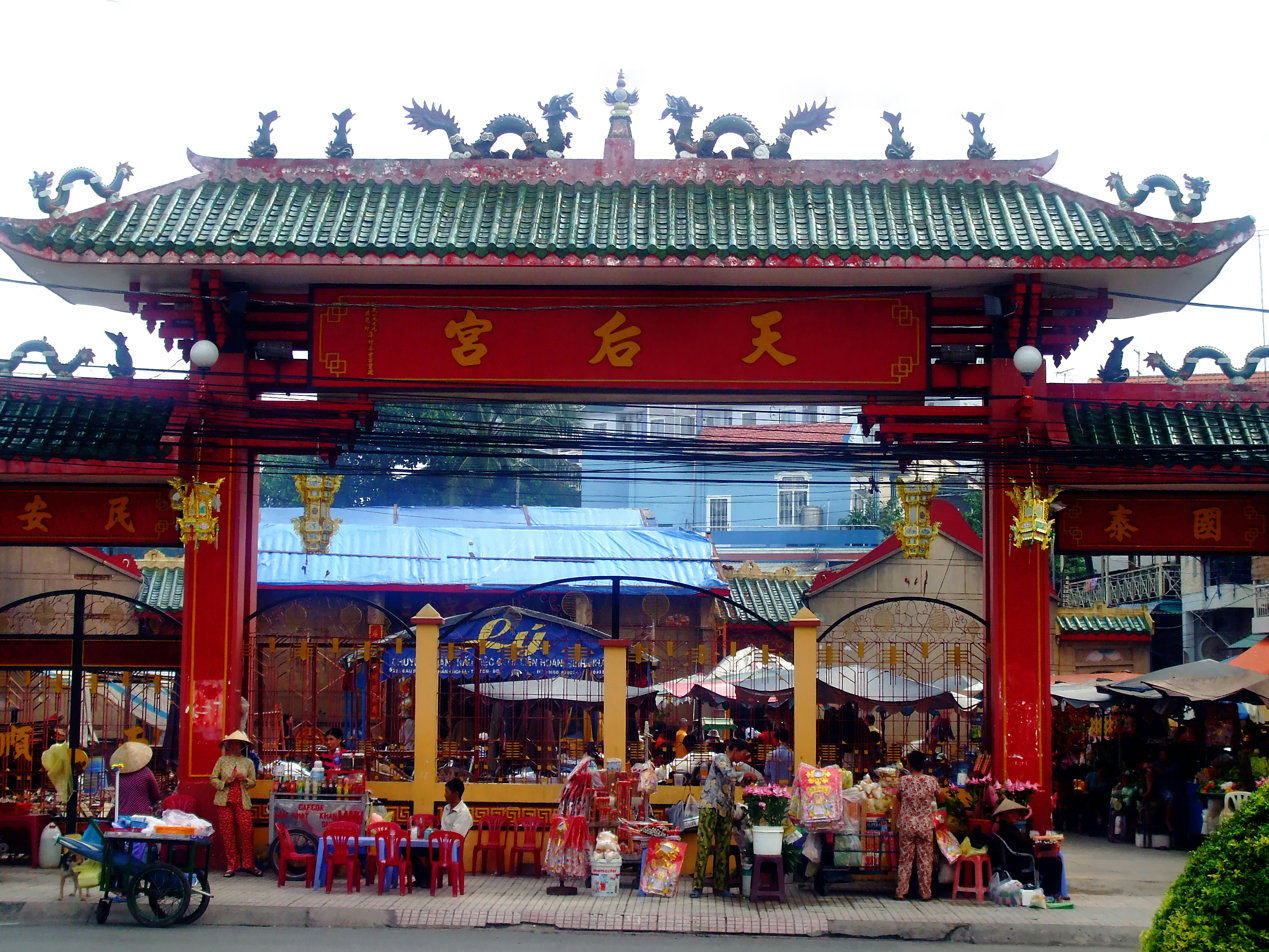
Thiên Hậu Pagoda in Bình Dương

Thiên Hậu Pagoda (Thiên Hậu Cung 天后宮), also known as Chùa Bà Thiên Hậu (天后祠, 天后寺), abbreviated as chùa Bà or miếu Thiên Hậu (天后廟), is currently located at 4 Nguyễn Du Street, Phú Cường ward, Thủ Dầu Một city, Bình Dương Province, Vietnam. This temple was established by the Hoa communities to worship the goddess Mazu.

== History ==
It is unknown when Thiên Hậu Pagoda was built; it was initially located by the Hương Chủ Hiếu canal. By 1923, after the temple was damaged (some accounts say it was destroyed by fire), four Chinese communities including the Cantonese/Quảng Triệu (Việt, 粵), Teochew (Tiều, 潮), Hokkien (Mân, 閩), and Sùng Chính/Khánh Gia (Hẹ, 客) collaborated to rebuild the temple (miếu) to pagoda (chùa) at its current location.

== Architecture ==
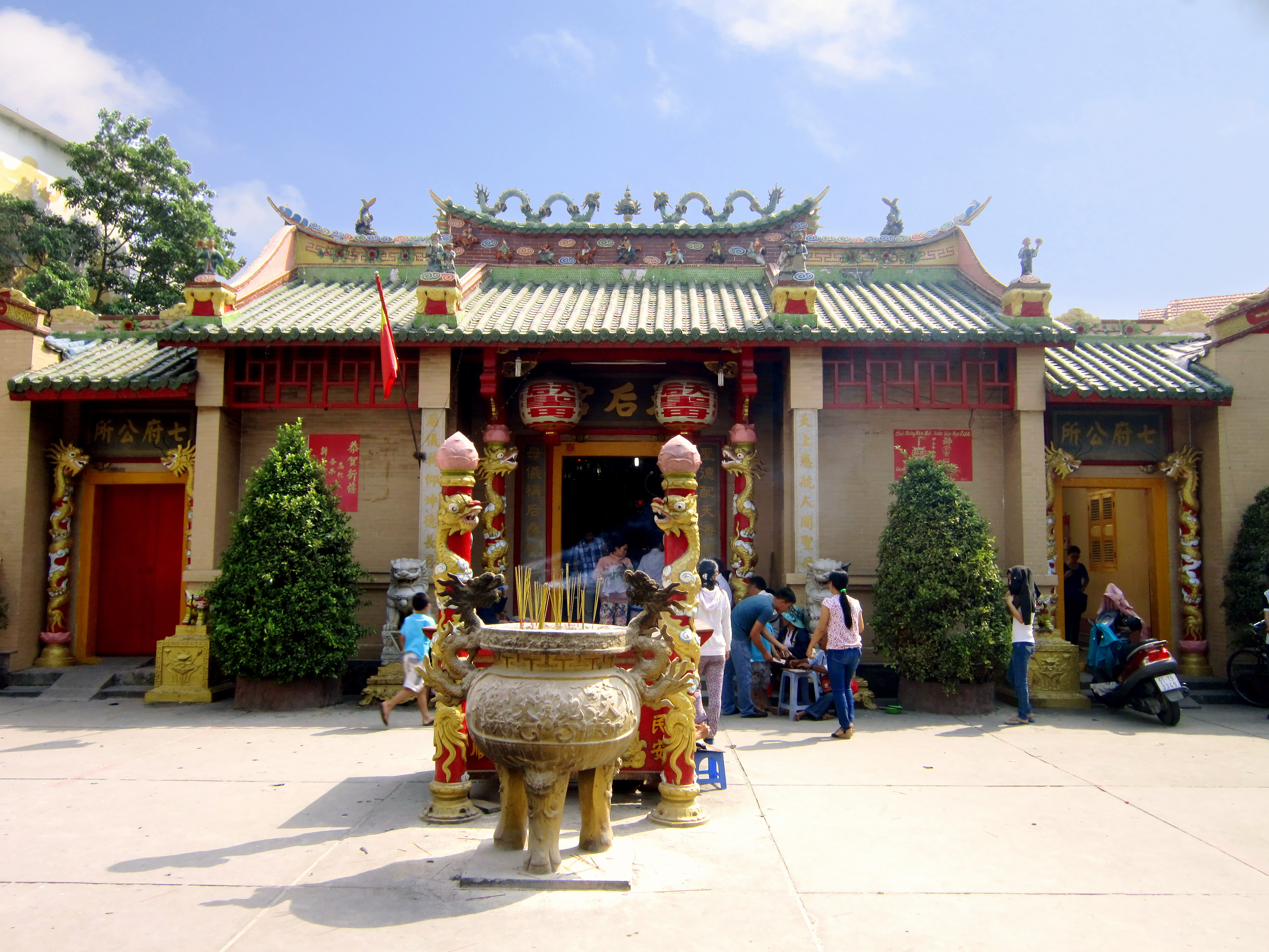
Main hall of Miếu Bà Thiên Hậu in Bình Dương

The pagoda consists of three rows of buildings. In the center is the main hall, inscribed with the three characters Thiên Hậu Cung (天后宮, meaning Temple of the Empress of Heaven). The two main doors bear the inscription Quốc Thái Dân An (國泰民安, meaning The country is prosperous, and the people are at peace), and flanking the doors are couplets praising the virtues of the goddess.

The roof of the main hall is tiled with yin-yang tiles, featuring raised carvings and decorated with images of "two dragons vying for a pearl" and "carp transforming into a dragon." On the edges of the roof are statues of the "Moon Lady," civil and military officials, and other figures in the style of Chinese architecture.

The two side buildings flanking the main hall are considered the East and West corridors. These serve as offices, meeting rooms, and storage areas, collectively called Thất phủ công sở (七府公所, meaning Office of the Seven Prefectures).

Inside the main hall are couplets praising the goddess for her miraculous powers and benevolence in saving people. In the central altar, the main deity worshipped is Mazu, with her statue dressed in elaborate attire that is regularly updated. To her left is an altar for the Ngũ Hành Nương Nương (Five Elemental Ladies), representing the five elements: metal, wood, water, fire, and earth. On the right side is the altar for Ông Bổn, also known as Bổn Đầu Công.

== Festival ==
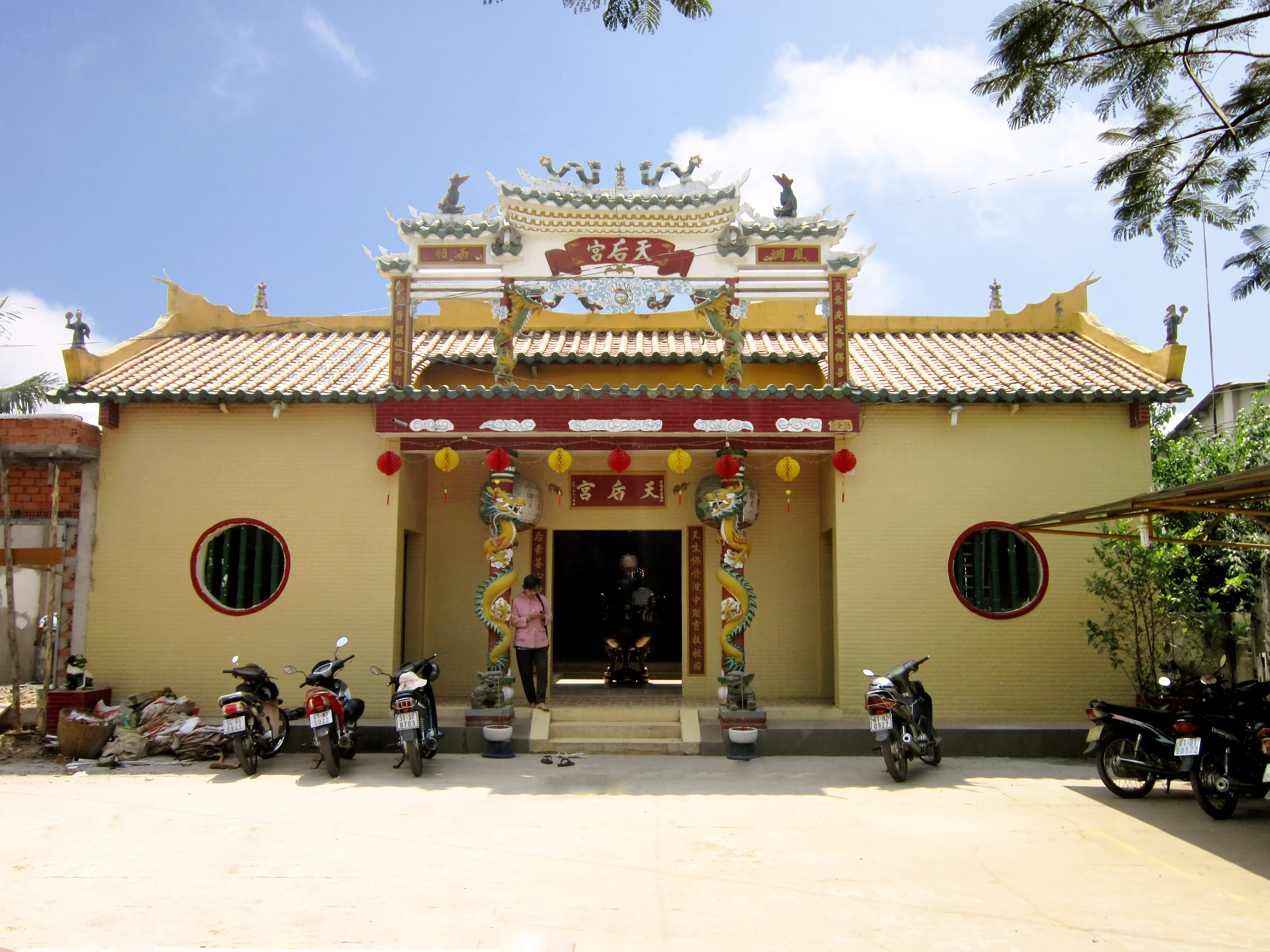
Miếu Bà Thiên Hậu by the Hương Chủ Hiếu canal

Thiên Hậu Pagoda in Thủ Dầu Một city serves as a place of worship for the Vietnamese Chinese community (primarily) in Bình Dương and neighboring provinces. The main festival celebrated at the pagoda is the Chùa Bà Festival, which is held from the night of the 14th to the morning of the 15th of the first month of the lunar calendar each year. The most crowded and lively event is the procession of the goddess's palanquin through the Thủ Dầu Một market, which takes place on the 15th. The procession attracts millions of people from all over the country. More than 30 lion dance troupes participate in the event, creating a lively and festive atmosphere.

== See also ==
- Mazu
