= Dĩ An Base Camp =

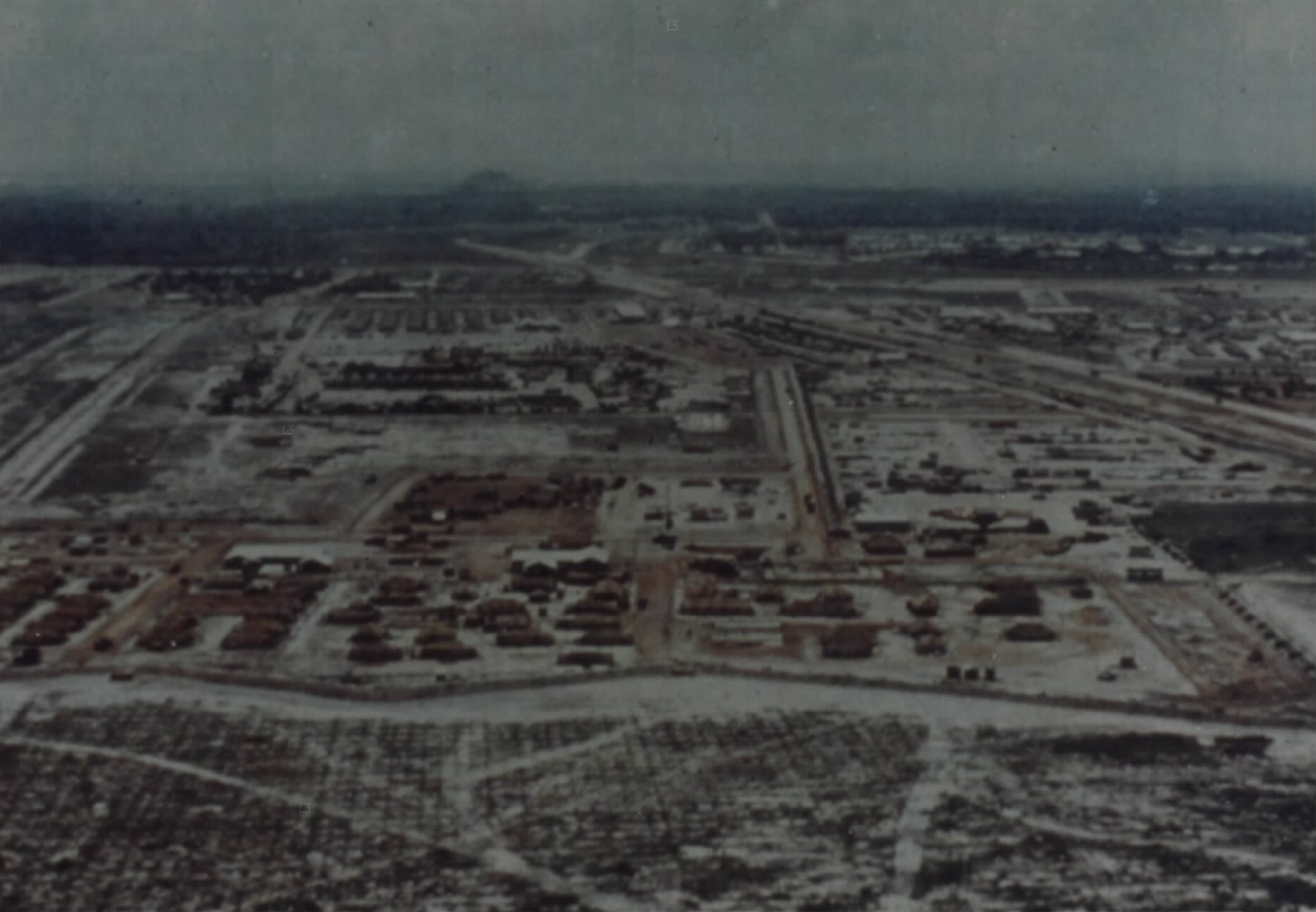
- Dĩ An Base Camp, 16 April 1966

Site information
- Type: Army/Marine Base

Location
- Coordinates: 10.9°N 106.739°E

Site history
- Built: 1966
- In use: 1966–present
- Battles/wars: Vietnam War

Garrison information
- Occupants: 1st Infantry Division; 11th Armored Cavalry Regiment; Republic of Vietnam Marine Division

Dĩ An Army Airfield
- IATA: none; ICAO: none

Summary
- Elevation AMSL: 108 ft (33 m)
- Interactive map of Dĩ An Army Airfield

Runways
Direction	Length		Surface
Direction	ft	m	Surface
	2,800	853	laterite

Dĩ An Base Camp (also known as Dĩ An Army Airfield or Sóng Thần Base Camp; named after the "Tsunami" (Sóng thần) nickname of the division) is a former U.S. Army and Republic of Vietnam Marine Division base in Dĩ An and part of Bình Hòa, Lái Thiêu (now is Thuận An), northeast of Saigon in southern Vietnam. It remains in use by the People's Army of Vietnam.

== History ==
=== 1966–72 ===
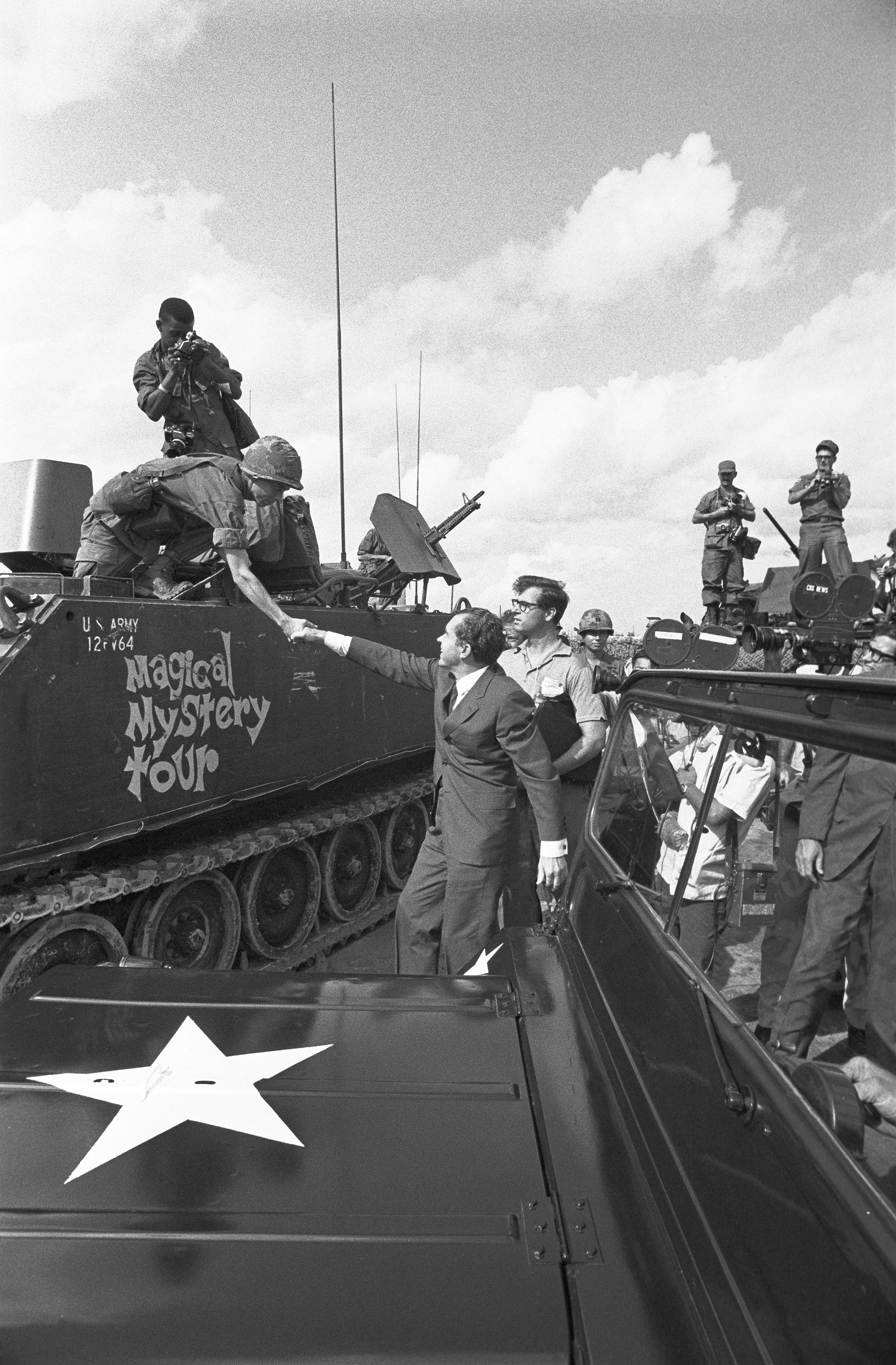
President Richard Nixon greets US troops, 30 July 1969

Dĩ An Base Camp was established at Dĩ An, 13 km northeast of Tan Son Nhut Air Base and 12 km southwest of Biên Hòa.

The 1st Infantry Division had its headquarters at Dĩ An from February 1966 until September 1967 and from November 1969 until April 1970.

Other units stationed at Dĩ An included:

- 1st Battalion, 7th Artillery (1967-April 1970)
- 12th Aviation Group comprising:
  - 7th Squadron, 1st Cavalry (February–June 1968)
  - 3rd Squadron, 17th Cavalry (October 1967-April 1972)
- 11th Armored Cavalry Regiment (July 1970-March 1971)
- 1st Squadron, 9th Cavalry
  - Headquarters Troop
  - Alpha Troop
  - Charlie Troop

The airfield was capable of accommodating C-7 Caribou and C-123 aircraft.

The Mobile Advisory Teams advisor school operated at the base from 1969 until September 1971.

On 30 July 1969, US President Richard Nixon visited the base on his only Presidential visit to South Vietnam, meeting US military personnel.

On 13 October 1971 Vietcong sappers destroyed two U.S. helicopters at the camp.

On 8 September 1972 the Republic of Vietnam Marine Division established a training center, ranges, hospital, recruit depot and LVT base on part of the former camp and named it Song Than Camp.

== Current use ==
The base remains in use by the 4th Corps of People's Army of Vietnam, while the logistics base has transformed into Sóng Thần Industrial Park I, II and residential area.
