= Lái Thiêu =

Lái Thiêu Phường Lái Thiêu Tân Thới, Phú Long, Bình Nhâm
- Ward
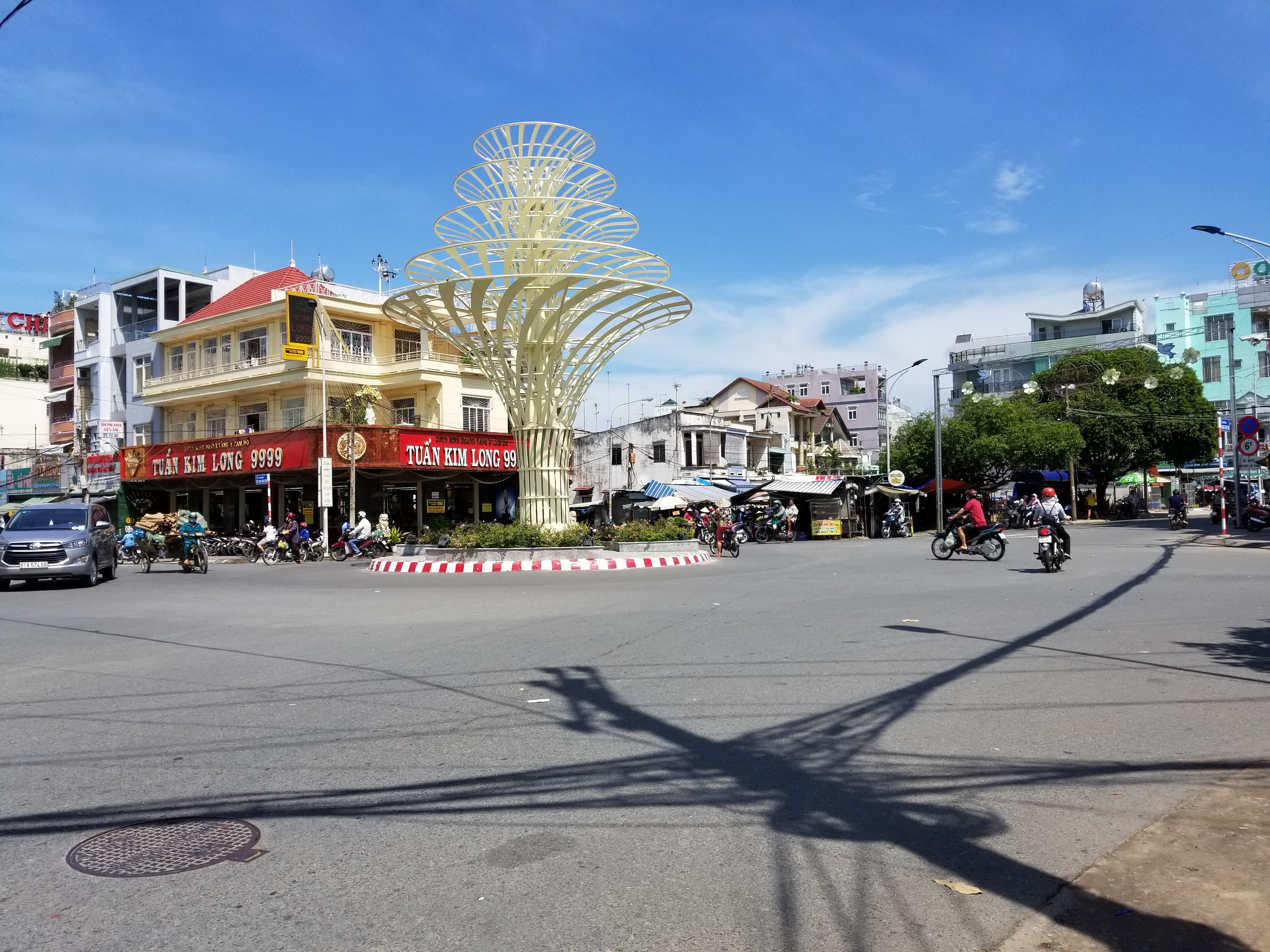
- Lái Thiêu Market Roundabout
- Interactive map of Lái Thiêu
- Coordinates: 10°54′17.6″N 106°42′00.0″E
- Country: Vietnam
- Municipality: Ho Chi Minh City
- Established: June 16, 2025

Area
  - Total: 5.97 sq mi (15.46 km^{2})

Population (2024)
  - Total: 118,852
  - Density: 19,910/sq mi (7,688/km^{2})
- Time zone: UTC+07:00 (Indochina Time)
- Administrative code: 25966

Lái Thiêu (Vietnamese: Phường Lái Thiêu) is a ward of Ho Chi Minh City, Vietnam. It is one of the 168 new wards, communes and special zones of the city following the reorganization in 2025.

Lái Thiêu is widely known for its ceramics and fruits.

== History ==
By the end of the 19th century, Lái Thiêu had been a populous settlement of Thủ Dầu Một province, French Cochinchina. In 1936, the government established the Lái Thiêu district with Lái Thiêu being the district capital. By 1975, Lái Thiêu district was subdivided into 11 communes: Tân Thới, Phú Long, Vĩnh Phú, Bình Nhâm, Bình Hòa, Hưng Định, An Thạnh (Búng), An Sơn, Bình Chuẩn, Thuận Giao and An Phú.

In 1975, Thủ Dầu Một province was merged with Bình Phước province to establish Sông Bé province. Then in 1977, Lái Thiêu district also merged with Dĩ An district to establish Thuận An district. The new name Thuận An was given to tribute the Thuận An Hòa War Zone (whose name was the combination of Thuận Giao, An Phú and Bình Hòa). Thus, the name Lái Thiêu was no longer used until 1994, when it was given to the township (thị trấn) established from parts of Tân Thới, Phú Long, Bình Nhâm and Bình Hòa communes. Lái Thiêu township since became the capital of Thuận An district. In 2011, when Thuận An town was established, Lái Thiêu township became Lái Thiêu ward.

On June 16, 2025, the National Assembly Standing Committee issued Resolution No. 1685/NQ-UBTVQH15 on the arrangement of commune-level administrative units of Ho Chi Minh City in 2025 (effective from June 16, 2025). Accordingly, the entire land area and population of Bình Nhâm, Lái Thiêu wards and part of Vĩnh Phú ward of the former Thuận An city will be integrated into a new ward named Lái Thiêu (Clause 84, Article 1).

== Education ==
- Nguyen Trai High School
- Nguyen Van Tiet Middle School
- Phu Long Middle School
- Tran Quoc Toan Primary School

== Gallery ==
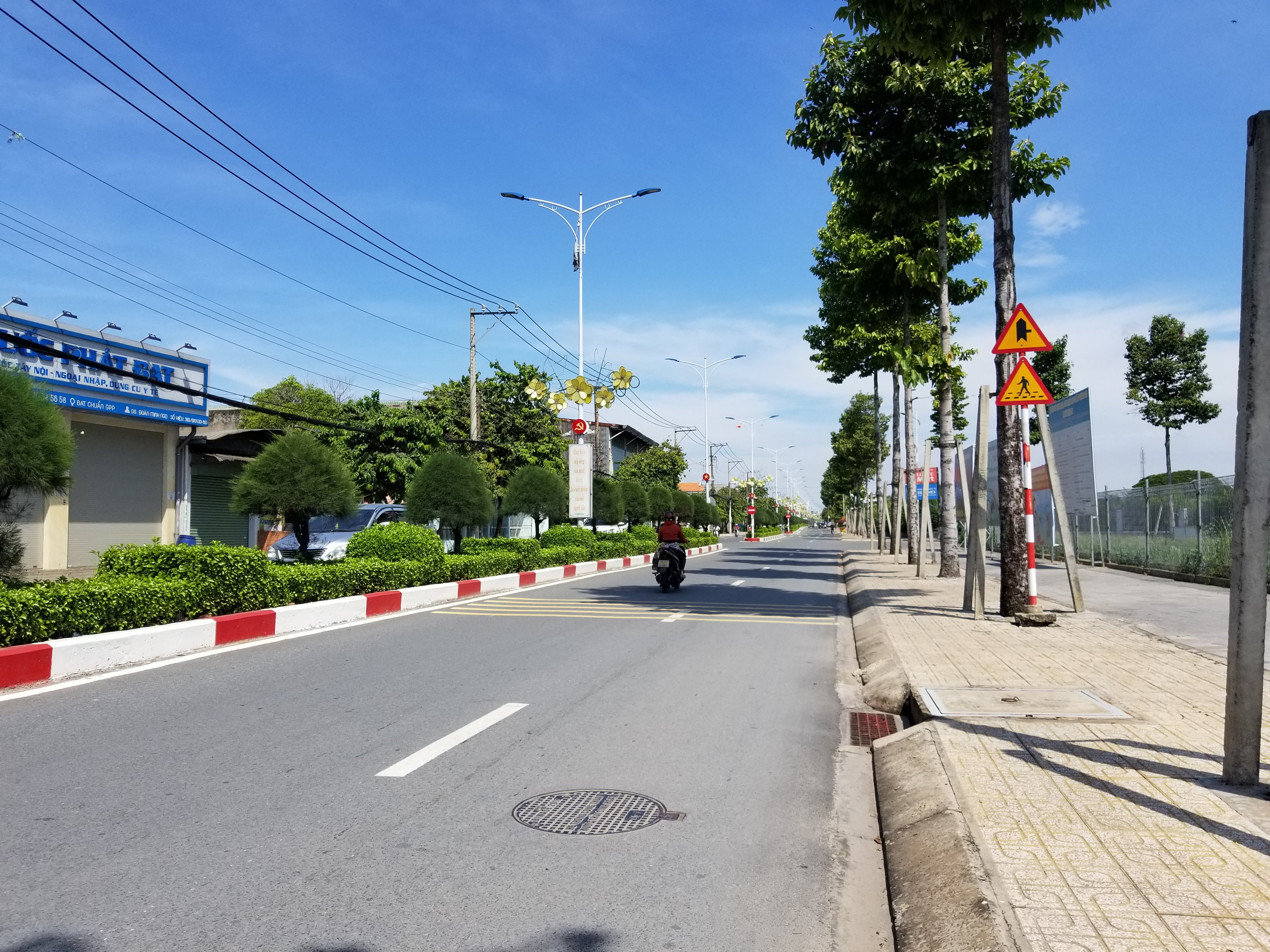
Nguyễn Trãi Street in Lái Thiêu ward

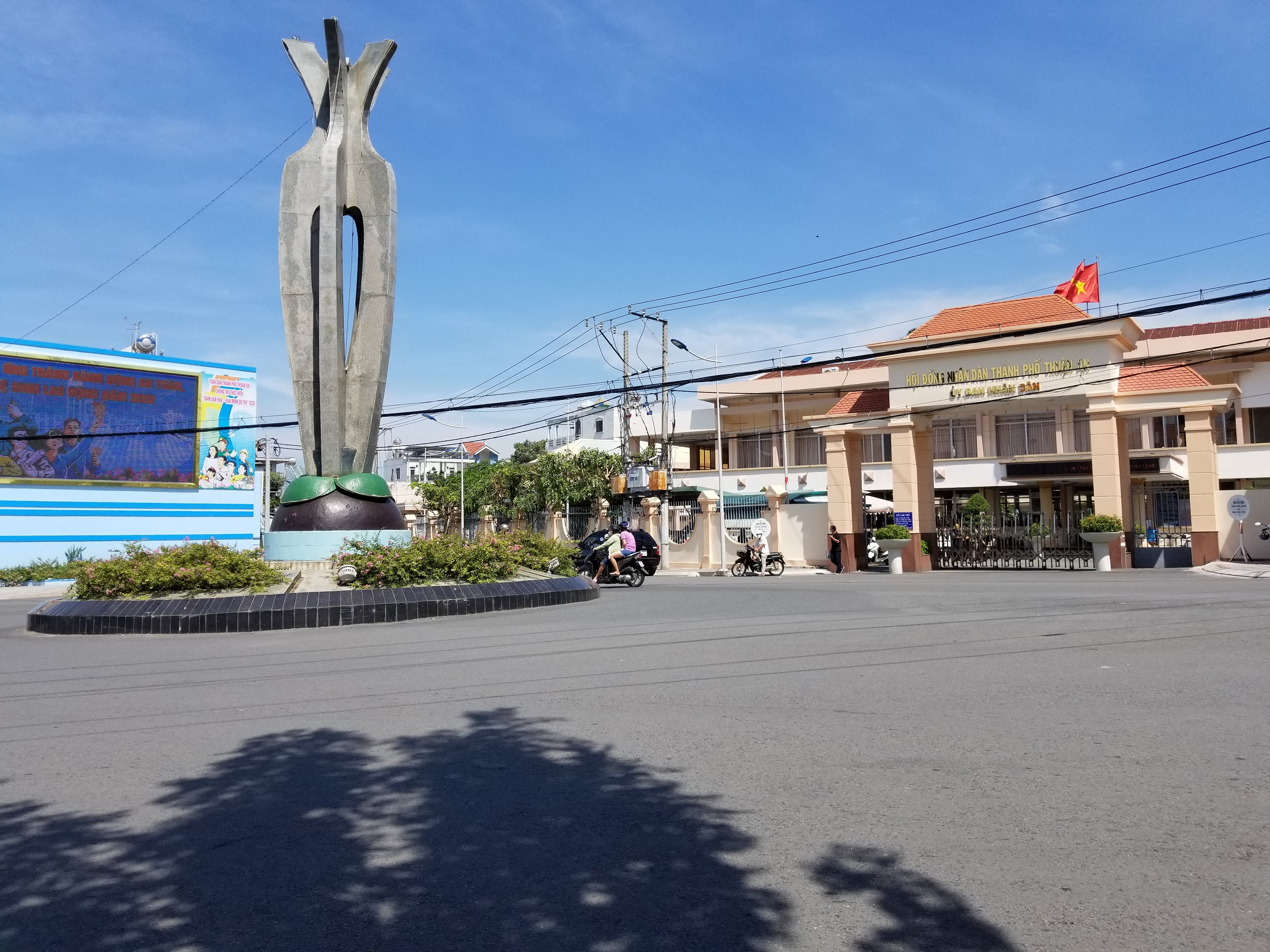
Thuận An City People's Committee Roundabout

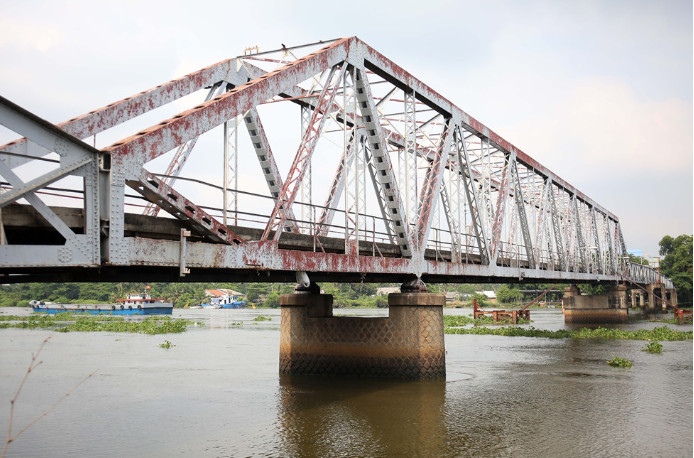
The historic Phú Long iron bridge used for trains on Saigon–Lộc Ninh railway, now no longer use and was demolished.
