= 2022 Binh Duong karaoke bar fire =

Building fire in Vietnam

- Native name: Vụ hỏa hoạn quán karaoke ở Bình Dương 2022
- Date: 6 September 2022; 3 years ago
- Time: 20:30 (UTC+07:00)
- Venue: An Phú karaoke bar
- Location: No. 166C, Quarter 1A, An Phú ward, Thuận An city, Bình Dương province, Vietnam; 10°56′54″N 106°43′49″E
- Type: Conflagration
- Cause: Electrical short circuit
- Deaths: 32
- Injuries: 2 people suffered serious injuries, 1 person suffered minor injuries

On 6 September 2022, the An Phú karaoke bar in Thuận An, Bình Dương Province, Vietnam caught fire, killing 32 people, according Bình Dương's authority, while some sources claim the fire kills 33 people. Some survivors jumped from second and third storey windows. It is one of the deadliest fires in modern Vietnamese history.
