= Thuận An =

Thuận An may refer to several places in Vietnam, including:

- Thuận An (city), a city of Bình Dương Province
- Thuận An, Cần Thơ, a ward of Thốt Nốt District
- Thuận An, Hậu Giang, a ward of Long Mỹ town
- Thuận An, Vĩnh Long, a commune of Bình Minh town
- Thuận An, Đắk Nông, a commune of Đắk Mil District
- Thuận An estuary, an estuary on the Hương River leads to South China Sea in Huế
- Thuận An, Huế, a ward of Huế
- Thuận An, Ho Chi Minh City, a ward of Ho Chi Minh City
