= Đông Hòa, Ho Chi Minh City =

Đông Hòa Phường Đông Hòa Bình An
- Ward
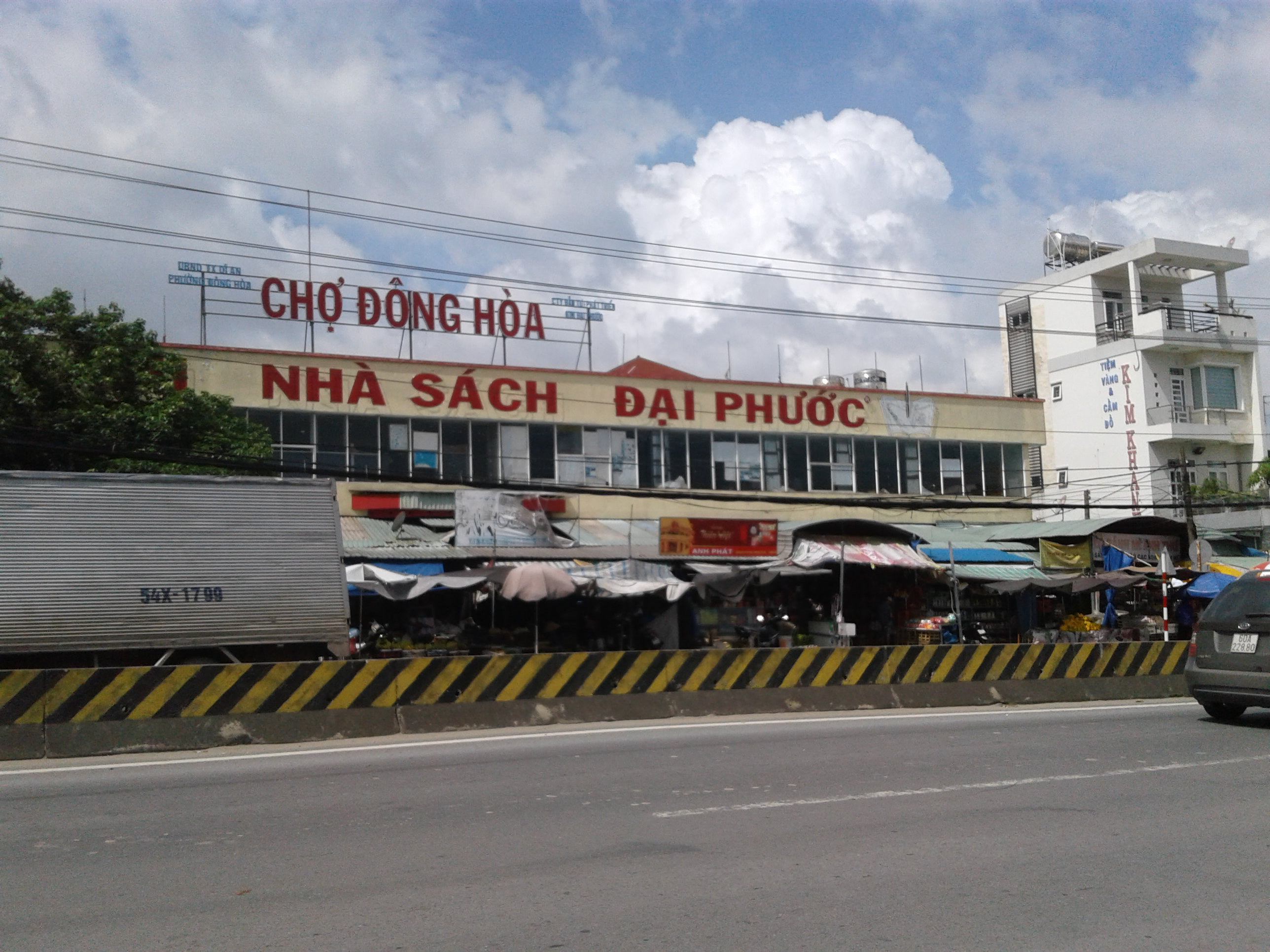
- Đông Hòa Market

- Seal
- Interactive map of Đông Hòa
- Coordinates: 10°53′27.5″N 106°47′06.4″E
- Country: Vietnam
- Municipality: Ho Chi Minh City
- Established: June 16, 2025

Area
  - Total: 8.45 sq mi (21.89 km^{2})

Population (2024)
  - Total: 132,056
  - Density: 15,620/sq mi (6,033/km^{2})
- Time zone: UTC+07:00 (Indochina Time)
- Administrative code: 25951

Đông Hòa (Vietnamese: Phường Đông Hòa) is a ward of Ho Chi Minh City, Vietnam. It is one of the 168 new wards, communes and special zones of the city following the reorganization in 2025.

== Division ==
Đông Hòa is divided into 16 quarters: Bình Thung 1, Bình Thung 2, Châu Thới, Đông A, Đông B, Hiệp Thắng, Ngãi Thắng, Nội Hóa 1, Nội Hóa 2, Quyết Thắng, Tân Hòa, Tân Lập, Tân Quý, Tây A, Tây B, Trung Thắng.

== Geography ==
Đông Hòa is about 18 km (11 mi) to the northeast of Saigon and 25 km (16 mi) away to the south of Bình Dương, it borders with:

- Biên Hòa, Đồng Nai to the north
- Trấn Biên and Long Hưng, Đồng Nai to the northeast by Đồng Nai River
- Long Bình to the north
- Linh Xuân to the south
- Dĩ An and Tân Đông Hiệp to the west

According to Official Dispatch No. 2896/BNV-CQĐP dated May 27, 2025 of the Ministry of Home Affairs, Đông Hòa ward has an area of 21.89 km², the population is 132,056, with a population density of 6,032. peope/km² (statistical data as of December 31, 2024, in accordance with Article 6 of Resolution No. 76/2025/UBTVQH15 dated April 14, 2025 of the National Assembly Standing Committee).

== History ==
Previously, Đông Hòa was a commune within Dĩ An district, Bình Dương province.

On January 13, 2011, the Government issued Resolution 04/NQ-CP regarding the establishment of the towns of Dĩ An and Thuận An in Bình Dương province. Pursuant to this, Đông Hòa Ward was established within the town of Dĩ An, encompassing the entire area and population of the former Đông Hòa Commune.

On June 12, 2025, the National Assembly Standing Committee issued Resolution No. 202/2025/QH15 regarding the reorganization of provincial-level administrative units (the resolution takes effect on June 12, 2025). Under this resolution, the provinces of Bà Rịa–Vũng Tàu and Bình Dương are to be merged into Ho Chi Minh City. Later, in 2020, Đông Hòa ward is under the city of Dĩ An.

On June 16, 2025, the National Assembly Standing Committee issued Resolution No. 1685/NQ-UBTVQH15 on the arrangement of commune-level administrative units of Ho Chi Minh City in 2025 (effective from June 16, 2025). Accordingly, the entire land area and population of Bình An, Bình Thắng and Đông Hòa wards of the former Dĩ An city will be integrated into a new ward named Đông Hòa (Clause 79, Article 1) directly under Ho Chi Minh City.

== Education ==
=== University Village ===
VNU-HCM Dormitory Zone B from above

National University Village or initially known as Thủ Đức University Village (Vietnamese: Làng Đại Học Quốc Gia, Làng Đại học Thủ Đức), is the common name for the Vietnam National University, Ho Chi Minh City Urban Area, which spans across the wards of Đông Hòa and Linh Xuân (formerly part of Linh Trung, Thủ Đức). The project was announced in January 1995, based on the master plan for the Thủ Đức University Village, originally developed for the University of Saigon by Ngô Viết Thụ and Lê Văn Lắm in the 1960s. Although more than half of the development was in the former Dĩ An area, it is called as Thủ Đức University Village as this area was still part of Thủ Đức district, Gia Định province during the 1960s.

List of buildings in the village located in Đông Hòa boundary (not all are part of VNU-HCM system):

- Dormitory Zone B (Zone A is technically in Đông Hòa but the address is in Linh Xuân)
- Creative Square (Quảng trường Sáng tạo)
- Student Cultural House
- Ho Chi Minh City University of Technology
- Ho Chi Minh City University of Science
- Ho Chi Minh City International University
- University of Health Sciences, VNU-HCM
- Ho Chi Minh City University of Agriculture and Forestry (entrance and part of campus is in Linh Xuân)
- VNU-HCM High School for the Gifted, Campus 2
- Sports and Physical Education Center
- Center For National Defense And Security Training

=== Other institution ===
- Vocational College of Machinery and Irrigation - Ho Chi Minh City Subsidiary
- Đông An Polytechnic
- Bình An High School

== Attractions ==
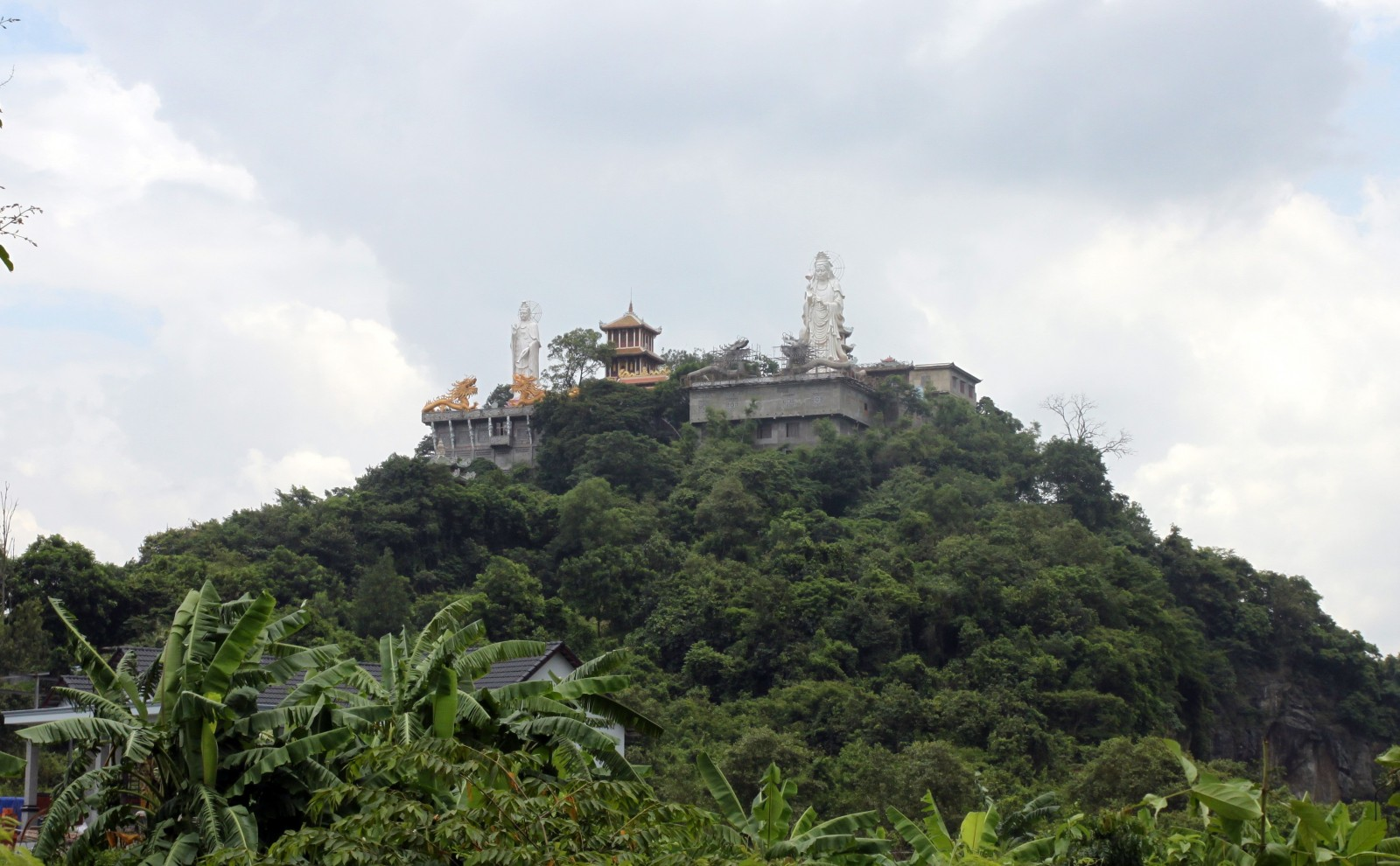
Châu Thới Mountain and the Châu Thới Sơn Tự (a temple named after the mountain Hán-Việt name) on the peak

View from Châu Thới Mountain

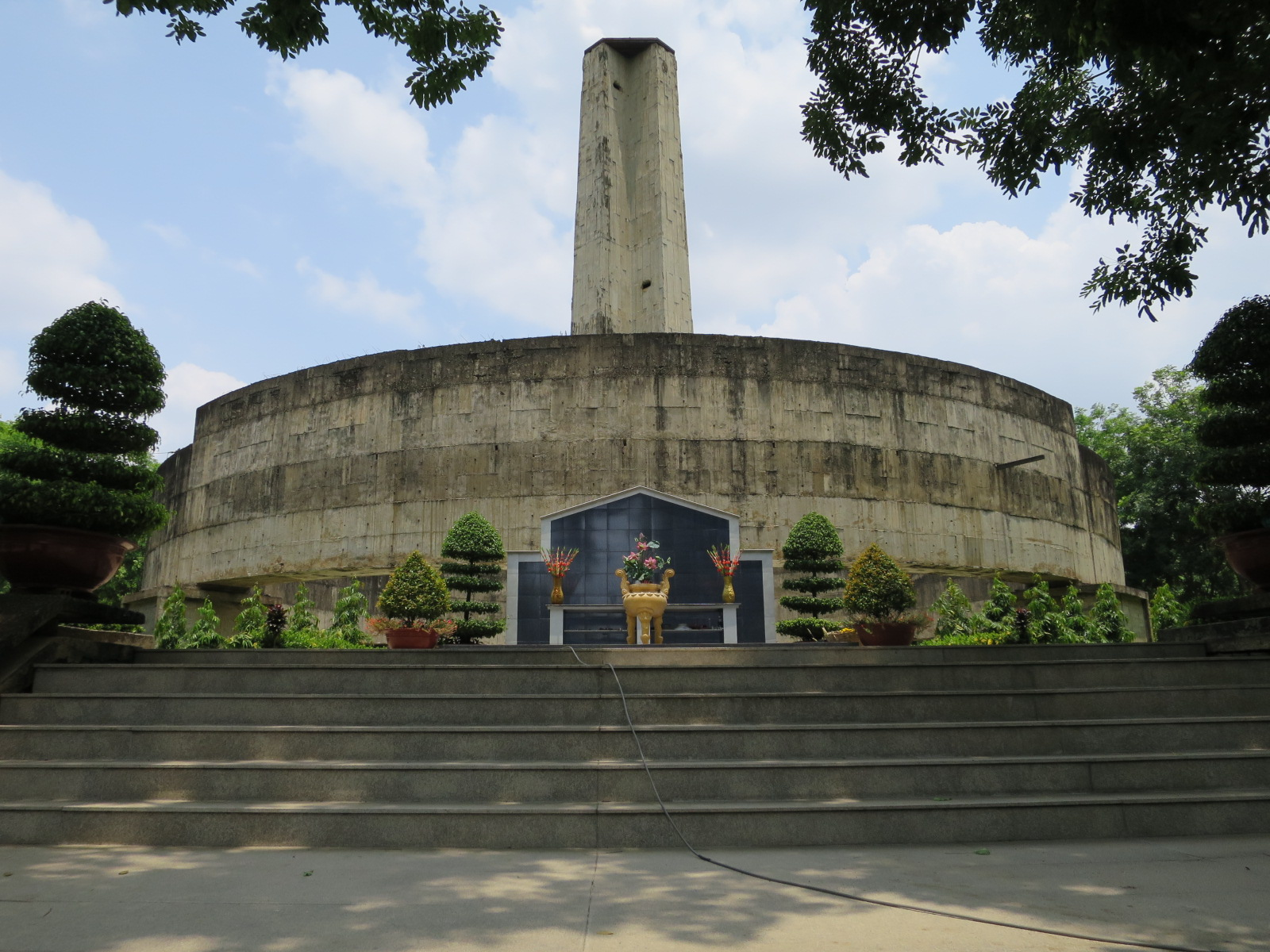
Bình An Cemetery

VNU-HCM Student Cultural House
