= Bình An Cemetery =

Cemetery in Dĩ An, Bình Dương Province, Vietnam

- ARVN Cemetery
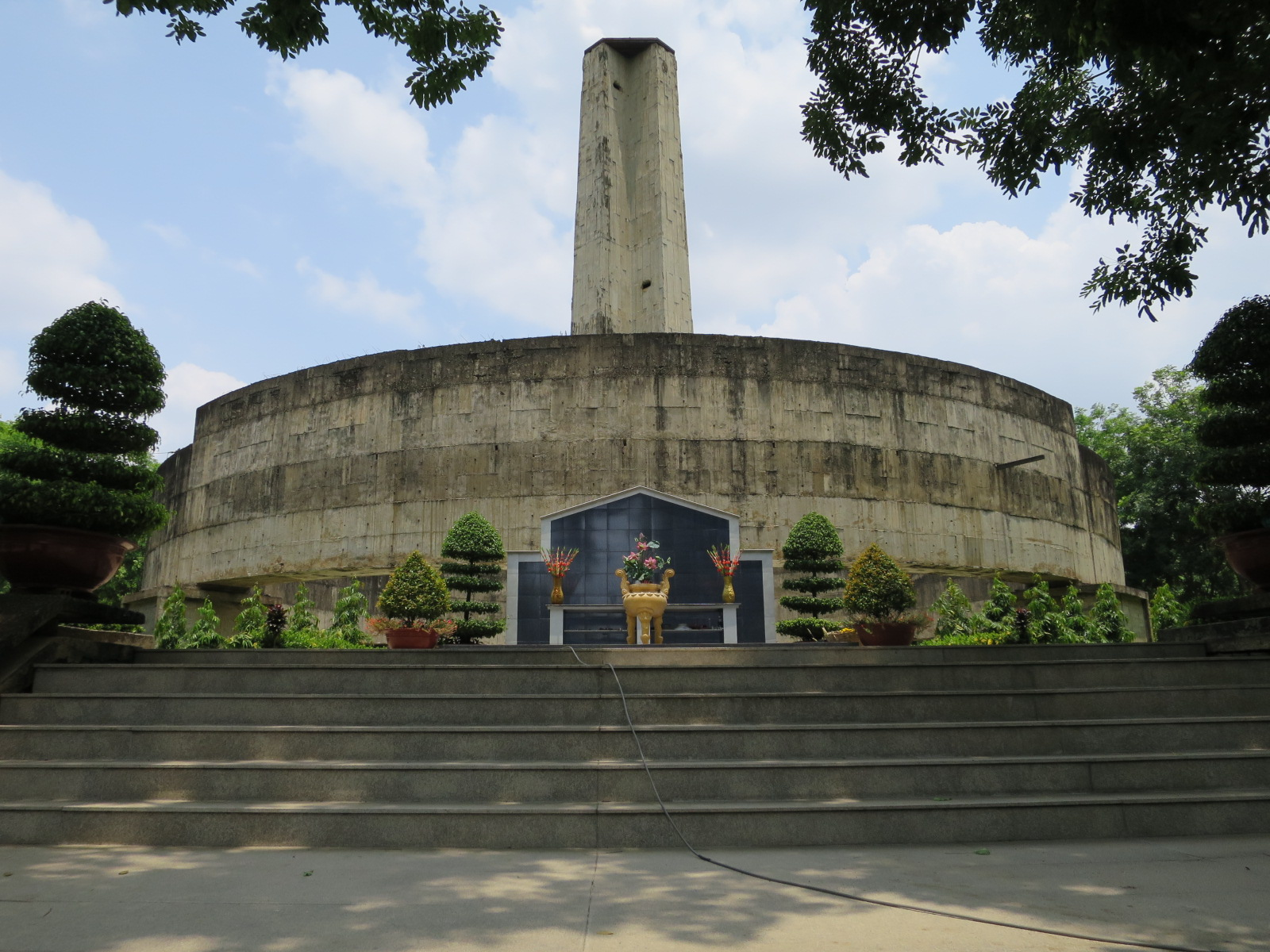
- Central monument at the Cemetery
- Interactive map of Bình An Cemetery

Details
- Established: ~1965
- Location: Đông Hòa, Ho Chi Minh City
- Country: Vietnam
- Coordinates: 10°53′21″N 106°48′37″E
- Type: Public
- Owned by: Government of Vietnam
- Size: 58 ha (140 acres)
- No. of graves: ~12,000

The Bình An Cemetery (Vietnamese: Nghĩa trang Quân Đội Bình An), formerly the Biên Hòa Military Cemetery (Vietnamese: Nghĩa trang Quân Đội Biên Hòa) is a cemetery in Đông Hòa, Ho Chi Minh City (formerly Bình An, Dĩ An City) Vietnam. It was an Army of the Republic of Vietnam (ARVN) military cemetery.

The cemetery was apparently established in 1965, although the earliest graves appear to date from 1968.

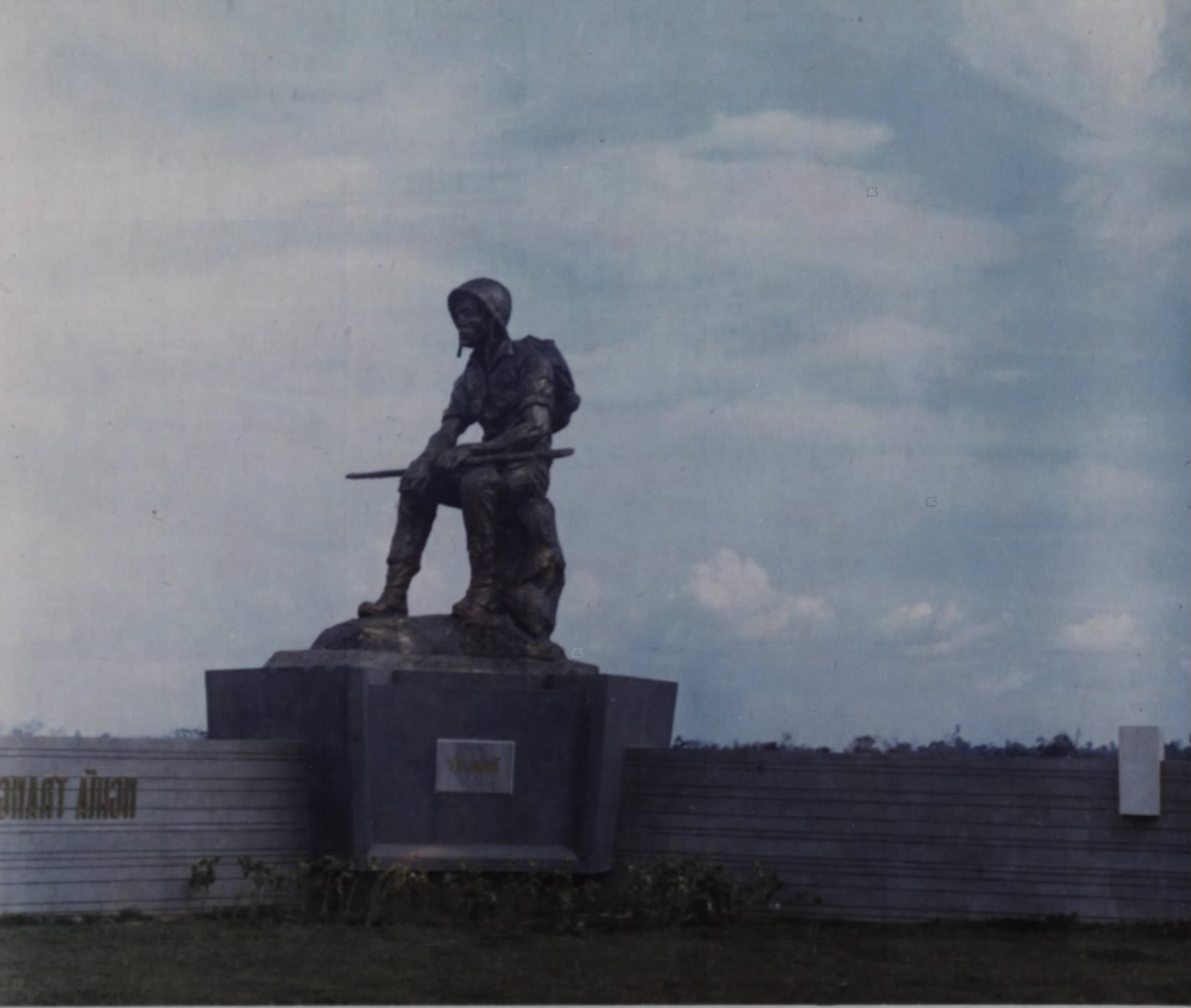
Thương Tiếc or weary soldier statue, November 1966

The location of the cemetery was marked by a 13 feet (4.0 m) tall statue on Highway 1 by Vietnamese sculptor, Nguyen Thanh Thu, depicting a weary ARVN soldier seated with his M1 rifle on his lap that would come to be nicknamed Thuong Tiec. The statue was originally caste in concrete at a cost of US$170 and put in place in 1966, however in 1972 it was replaced by a bronze version at a cost of US$22,000. Over time legends grew of the Thuong Tiec statue coming to life to warn of Vietcong attacks.

The statue stood at the beginning of a ceremonial road leading to a hilltop pagoda accessible by stairs, behind the pagoda was a ceremonial walkway leading into the cemetery with the graves laid out in a series of circles around a circular monument and obelisk. The cemetery was built to hold a maximum of 30,000 graves and by the time of the Fall of Saigon in April 1975 approximately 16,000 burials had taken place there, with half the graves covered by cement and half simple dirt mounds. By 2009 total burials numbered approximately 12,000.

Following the Fall of Saigon the Thuơng Tiếc statue was destroyed and access to the cemetery was restricted until 2006 when families were allowed to tend the graves. A sign was erected outside the cemetery which read "Here lie the Americans' puppet soldiers who have paid the price for their crimes."

In 2015 then United States ambassador to Vietnam Ted Osius visited the cemetery.
