= Dĩ An =

Dĩ An Phường Dĩ An An Bình
- Ward
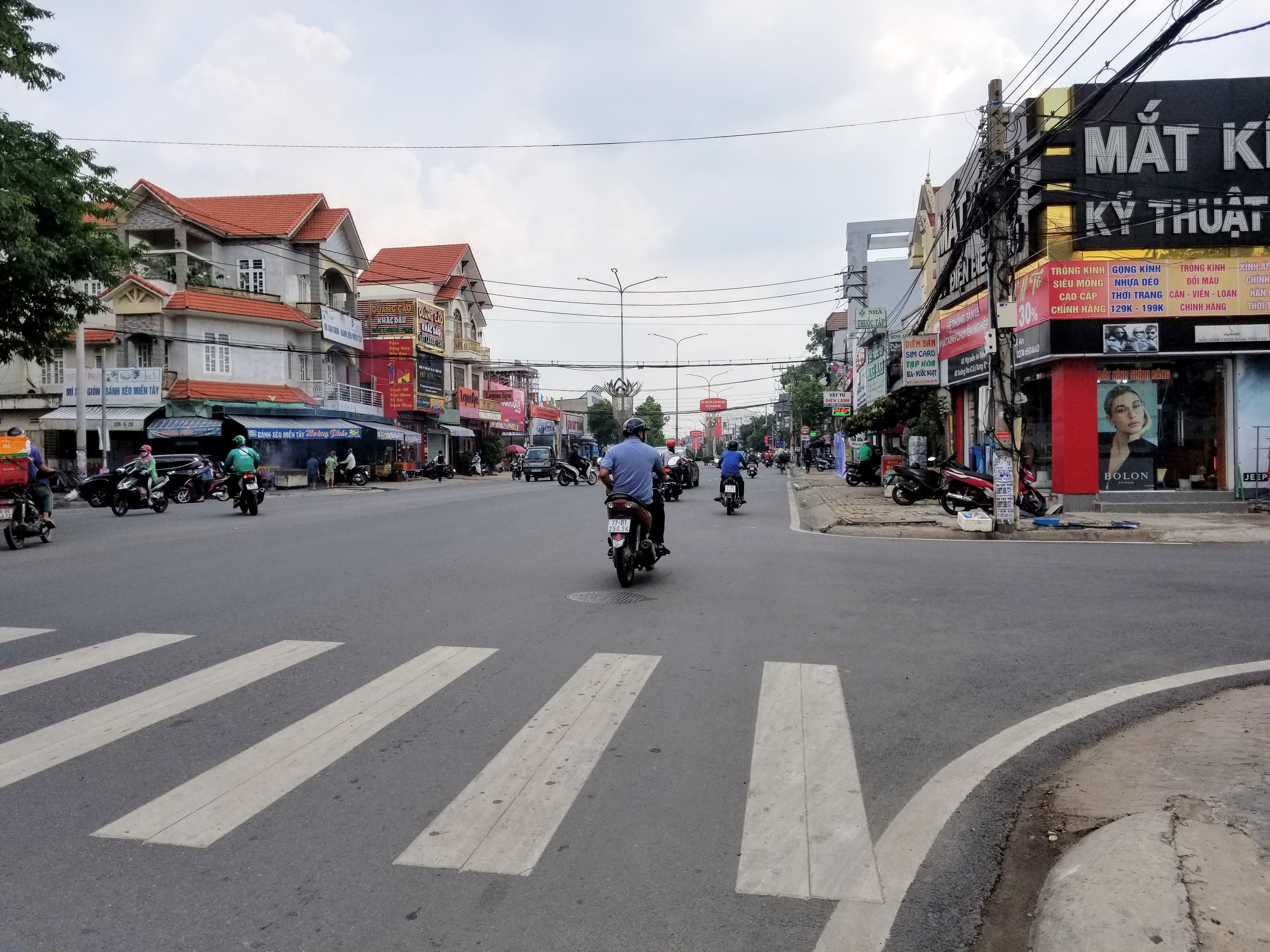
- A road in Di An
- Interactive map of Dĩ An
- Coordinates: 10°54′02.2″N 106°45′52.9″E
- Country: Vietnam
- Municipality: Ho Chi Minh City
- Established: June 16, 2025

Area
  - Total: 8.25 sq mi (21.38 km^{2})

Population (2024)
  - Total: 227,817
  - Density: 27,600/sq mi (10,660/km^{2})
- Time zone: UTC+07:00 (Indochina Time)
- Administrative code: 25942

Dĩ An (Vietnamese: Phường Dĩ An) is a ward of Ho Chi Minh City, Vietnam. It is one of the 168 new wards, communes and special zones of the city following the reorganization in 2025, this is also the most populous ward in the city.

== Geography ==
Dĩ An is roughly 18 kilometers northeast of Saigon ward, and about 25 kilometers south of Bình Dương ward and has the following geographical location:

- To the north, it borders Tân Đông Hiệp ward
- To the northeast, it borders Đông Hòa ward
- To the southeast, it borders Linh Xuân ward
- To the southwest, it borders Tam Bình ward
- To the west, it borders Bình Hòa ward
- To the northwest, it borders An Phú ward

As of July 1, 2025, with a population of 227,817 people as of December 31, 2024, Dĩ An has become the most populous ward in Ho Chi Minh City.

== History ==
On June 16, 2025, the National Assembly Standing Committee issued Resolution No. 1685/NQ-UBTVQH15 on the arrangement of commune-level administrative units of Ho Chi Minh City in 2025 (effective from June 16, 2025). Accordingly, the entire land area and population of An Bình, Dĩ An wards and part of Tân Đông Hiệp ward of the former Dĩ An city will be integrated into a new ward named Dĩ An (Clause 80, Article 1).
