= Tam Bình, Ho Chi Minh City =

Tam Bình Phường Tam Bình Gò Dưa, Bình Chiểu, Bình Đức, Bình Phú
- Ward
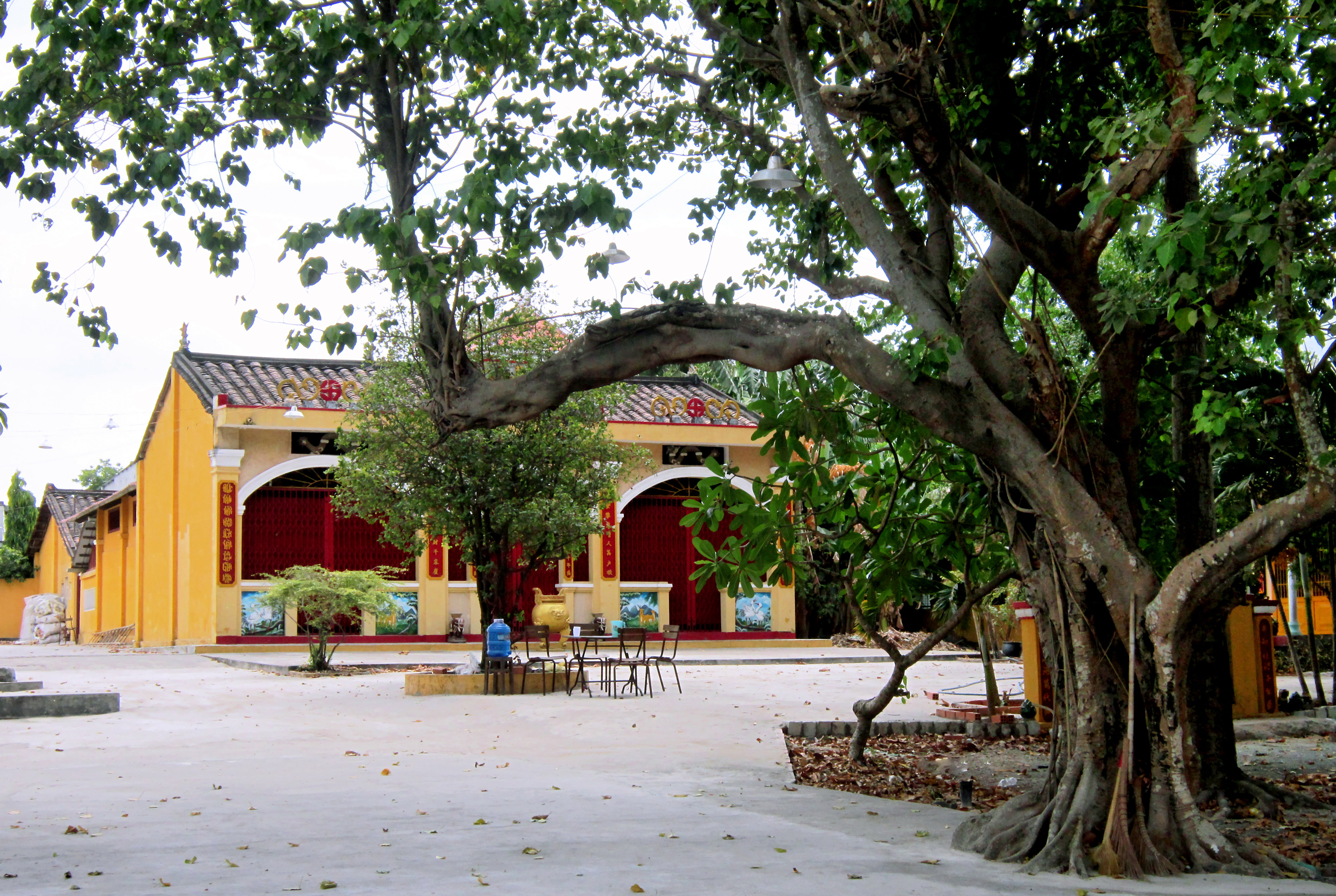
- Bình Đức communal house
- Interactive map of Tam Bình
- Coordinates: 10°52′04″N 106°44′03″E
- Country: Vietnam
- Municipality: Ho Chi Minh City
- Established: June 16, 2025

Area
  - Total: 4.14 sq mi (10.71 km^{2})

Population (2024)
  - Total: 153,414
  - Density: 37,100/sq mi (14,320/km^{2})
- Time zone: UTC+07:00 (Indochina Time)
- Administrative code: 26803

Tam Bình (Vietnamese: Phường Tam Bình) is a ward of Ho Chi Minh City, Vietnam. It is one of the 168 new wards, communes and special zones of the city following the reorganization in 2025.

== Geography ==
Tam Bình is about 14 km north of Saigon ward, borders with:

- Bình Hòa to the north
- Dĩ An to the east
- Linh Xuân to the southeast
- Hiệp Bình to the southwest

According to Official Dispatch No. 2896/BNV-CQĐP dated May 27, 2025 of the Ministry of Home Affairs, following the merger, Tam Bình has a land area of 16.01 km², the population as of December 31, 2024 is 215,638 people, the population density is 14,324 people/km².

== History ==
On June 16, 2025, the National Assembly Standing Committee issued Resolution No. 1685/NQ-UBTVQH15 on the arrangement of commune-level administrative units of Ho Chi Minh City in 2025 (effective from June 16, 2025). Accordingly, the entire land area and population of Bình Chiểu, Tam Bình and Tam Phú wards of the former Thủ Đức city will be integrated into a new ward named Tam Bình (Clause 69, Article 1).
