= Civil Operations and Rural Development Support =

American pacification program in the Vietnam War

The Civil Operations and Rural Development Support (CORDS) was a pacification program of the governments of South Vietnam and the United States during the Vietnam War. The program was created on 9 May 1967, and included military and civilian components of both governments. The objective of CORDS was to gain support for the government of South Vietnam from its rural population which was largely under influence or controlled by the insurgent communist forces of the Viet Cong (VC) and the North Vietnamese People's Army of Vietnam (PAVN).

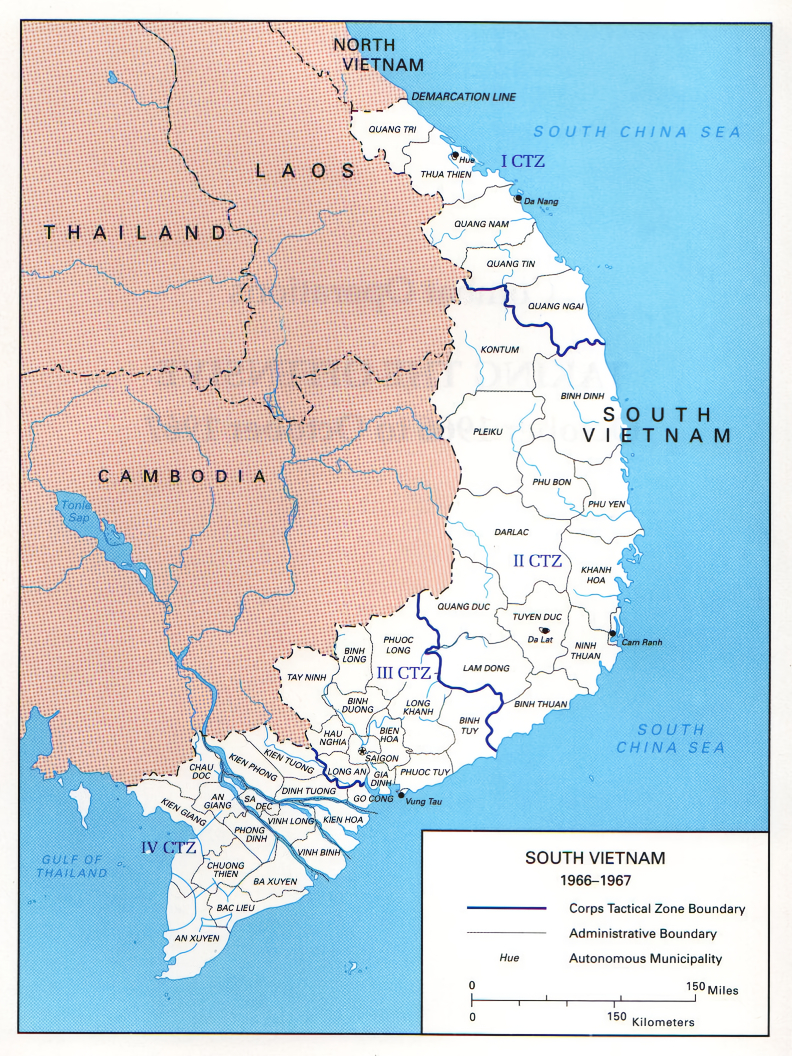
A map of South Vietnam showing the provinces and military tactical zones (I, II, III, and IV Corps).

Unlike earlier pacification programs in Vietnam, CORDS is seen by many authorities as a "successful integration of civilian and military efforts" to combat the insurgency. By 1970, 93 percent of the rural population of South Vietnam was believed by the United States to be living in "relatively secure" villages. CORDS had been extended to all 44 provinces of South Vietnam, and the communist insurgency was much reduced. Critics, however, have described the pacification programs and CORDS in terms such as "the illusion of progress". CORDS was, in the estimation of its first leader, Robert W. Komer, "too little, too late."

With the withdrawal of U.S. military forces and many civilian personnel, CORDS was abolished in February 1973. CORDS temporary successes were eroded in the 1970s, as the war became primarily a struggle between the conventional military forces of South and North Vietnam rather than an insurgency. North Vietnam was victorious in 1975.

== South Vietnamese attempts at pacification ==
The continuing struggle during the Vietnam War to gain the support of the rural population for the government of South Vietnam was called pacification. To Americans, pacification programs were often referred to by the phrase winning hearts and minds.

The anti-communist Ngo Dinh Diem government of South Vietnam (1955–63) had its power base among the urban and Catholic population. The government controlled the cities and large towns but Diem's efforts to extend government power to the villages, where most of the population lived, were mostly unsuccessful. The Viet Cong were gaining support and mobilizing the peasantry to oppose the government. Between 1956 and 1960, the VC instituted a land reform program dispossessing landlords and distributing land to farmers.

In 1959, Diem revived the agroville program of the French era with the objective of moving peasants into new agricultural settlements which contained schools, medical clinics, and other facilities supported by the government. The program failed due to peasant resistance, poor management, and disruption by the VC using guerrilla and terrorist tactics. In 1961, the government embarked on the Strategic Hamlet Program, designed partly by Robert Thompson, a British counter-insurgency expert. The idea was to move rural dwellers into fortified villages in which they would participate in self-defense forces for their protection and isolation from the guerrillas. The United States Ambassador to South Vietnam Frederick Nolting and CIA official William Colby supported the program. General Lionel C. McGarr, chief of the Military Assistance Advisory Group in South Vietnam, opposed it, favoring instead a mobile, professional South Vietnamese Army of the Republic of Vietnam (ARVN) undertaking what would later be called Search and Destroy missions rather than defending villages and territory. The program was implemented far too rapidly and coercively, and by 1964, many of the 2,600 strategic hamlets had fallen under VC control.

The next iteration of the pacification program came in 1964 with, for the first time, the direct participation in planning by the US Embassy and Military Assistance Command, Vietnam (MACV), the successor to MAAG. The Chien Thang (Struggle for Victory) pacification program was less ambitious than the Strategic Hamlet program, envisioning a gradual expansion, like an "oil spot" from government-controlled to VC controlled areas, by providing security and services to rural areas. Along with the Chien Thang program was the related Hop Tac (Victory) program, directly involving the U.S. military in pacification for the first time. Hop Tac envisioned a gradual expansion outward from Saigon of areas under South Vietnamese government control. These programs also failed as the ARVN was unable to provide adequate security and safety to rural residents in disputed areas.

== American and North Vietnamese involvement ==
In 1965, both the United States and North Vietnam rapidly increased the numbers of their soldiers in South Vietnam. Communist forces totaled 221,000 including an estimated 105 VC and 55 PAVN battalions. American soldiers in Vietnam totaled 175,000 by the end of the year, and the ARVN numbered more than 600,000. Commanding General William Westmoreland rejected the use of the U.S. army to pacify rural areas, instead utilizing U.S. superiority in mobility and firepower to find and combat VC and PAVN units. Intensification of the conflict caused many peasants and rural dwellers to flee to the cities for safety. The number of internal refugees increased from about 500,000 in 1964 to one million in 1966. By December 1966, South Vietnam could only claim—optimistically in the U.S.'s view—to control 4,700 of the country's 12,000 hamlets and 10 of its 16 million people

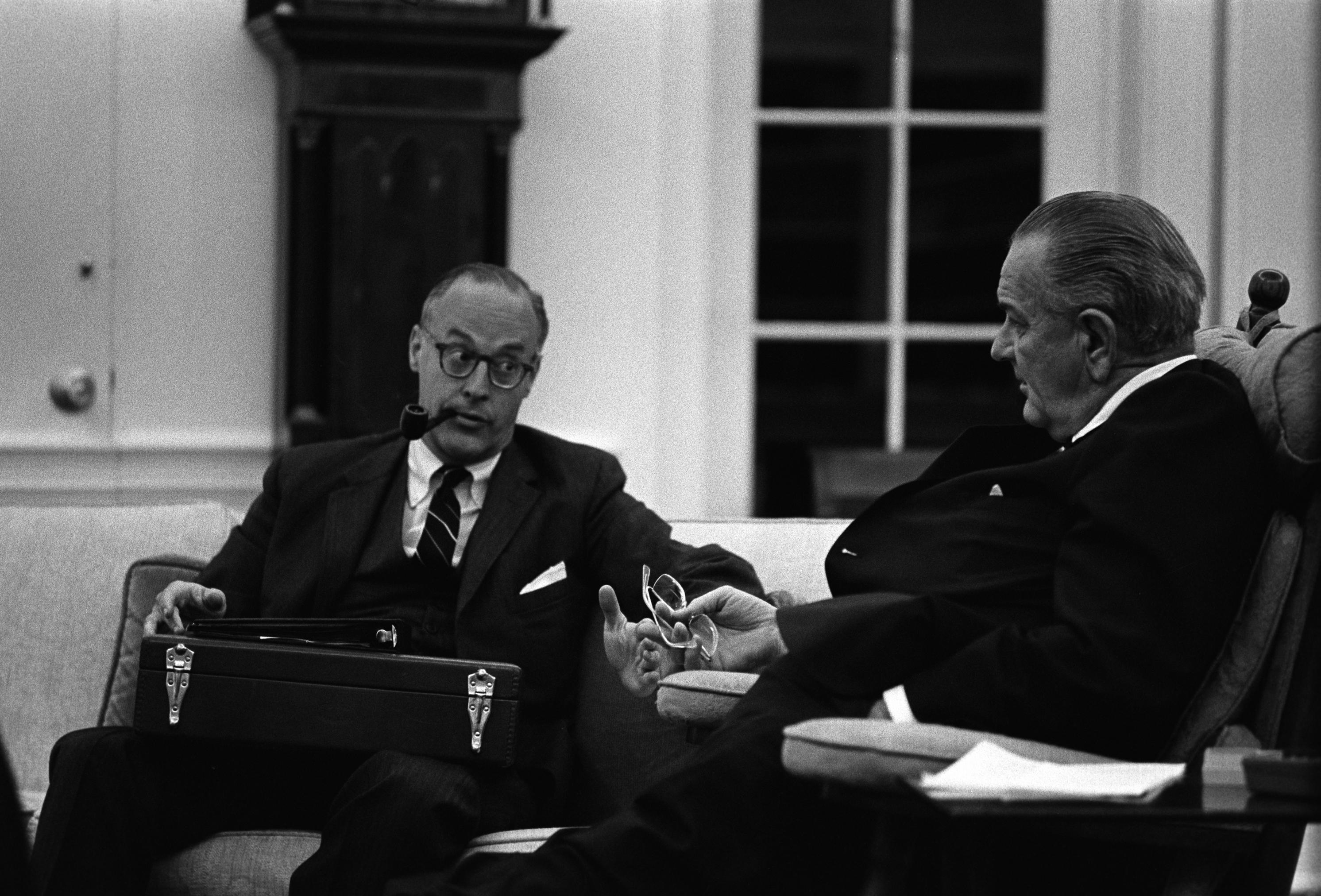
Robert Komer (left) meets with President Johnson.

In February 1966, President Lyndon Johnson at a meeting with South Vietnamese and American leaders in Hawaii promoted the concept of pacification to "get the gospel of pacification carved into the hearts and minds of all concerned." Shortly after that he appointed CIA official and National Security Council member Robert W. Komer ("Blowtorch Bob") as his special assistant for supervising pacification. Komer's challenge was to unite the U.S. government agencies—the military, Department of State, CIA and the Agency for International Development—involved in pacification projects into a unified effort. Komer recommended the responsibility for pacification be vested in MACV, headed by Westmoreland, through a civilian deputy who would head the U.S. pacification effort commanding both U.S. military and civilian personnel. Although his proposal was unpopular in all the agencies, Komer, with the support of Johnson, pressed forward. As a halfway measure, the Office of Civil Operations (OCO) was set up with civilian leadership in November 1966, to coordinate all civilian pacification programs. OCO failed but strengthened Komer and Johnson's view that MACV leadership of the pacification program was essential. Komer believed that only the military had sufficient personnel and resources to undertake such an ambitious program.

== Development of the program ==
Komer argued that the pacification success desired by Johnson could only be achieved by integrating three tasks. The first and most basic requirement for pacification had to be security, because the rural population had to be kept isolated from the VC and PAVN. If this was achieved, the insurgents' forces had to be weakened both by destroying their infrastructure among the population and by developing programs to win over the people's sympathy for the South Vietnamese government and the U.S. forces. The third point emphasized by Komer was that the new strategy had to be applied on a large scale in order to turn around what had been up until then, at best, an indecisive war.

Organizationally, these goals implicitly required that efforts be concentrated under a single command. In Komer's view, only the U.S. military had the resources and personnel to implement a large-scale pacification plan. After initial reservations, Westmoreland agreed with the plan, but civilian agencies still balked. Johnson overruled them, and on 9 May 1967, CORDS was created. Komer was appointed one of Westmoreland's three deputy commanders with the title of ambassador and the equivalent rank of a three-star general. This was the first time in U.S. history that an ambassador had served under a military command and been given authority over military personnel and resources.

Komer chose a military officer as his deputy and repeated the pattern of having either a civilian in charge of every component of CORDS with a military deputy or, alternatively, a military commander with a civilian deputy. He consolidated all the diverse pacification and civil affairs programs in Vietnam—military and civilian—under the authority of CORDS. Starting with a staff of 4,980, CORDS expanded to 8,327 personnel in the first six months of its operation. In 1968, CORDS was working in all 44 provinces and eventually was functioning in all 250 districts of South Vietnam. About 85 percent of CORDS personnel were military, the remainder civilians. Each province was headed by a Vietnamese province chief, usually a colonel, who was supported by an American provincial senior adviser. The adviser's staff was divided into a civilian part which supervised area and community development and a military part which handled security issues.

== Organization and function ==
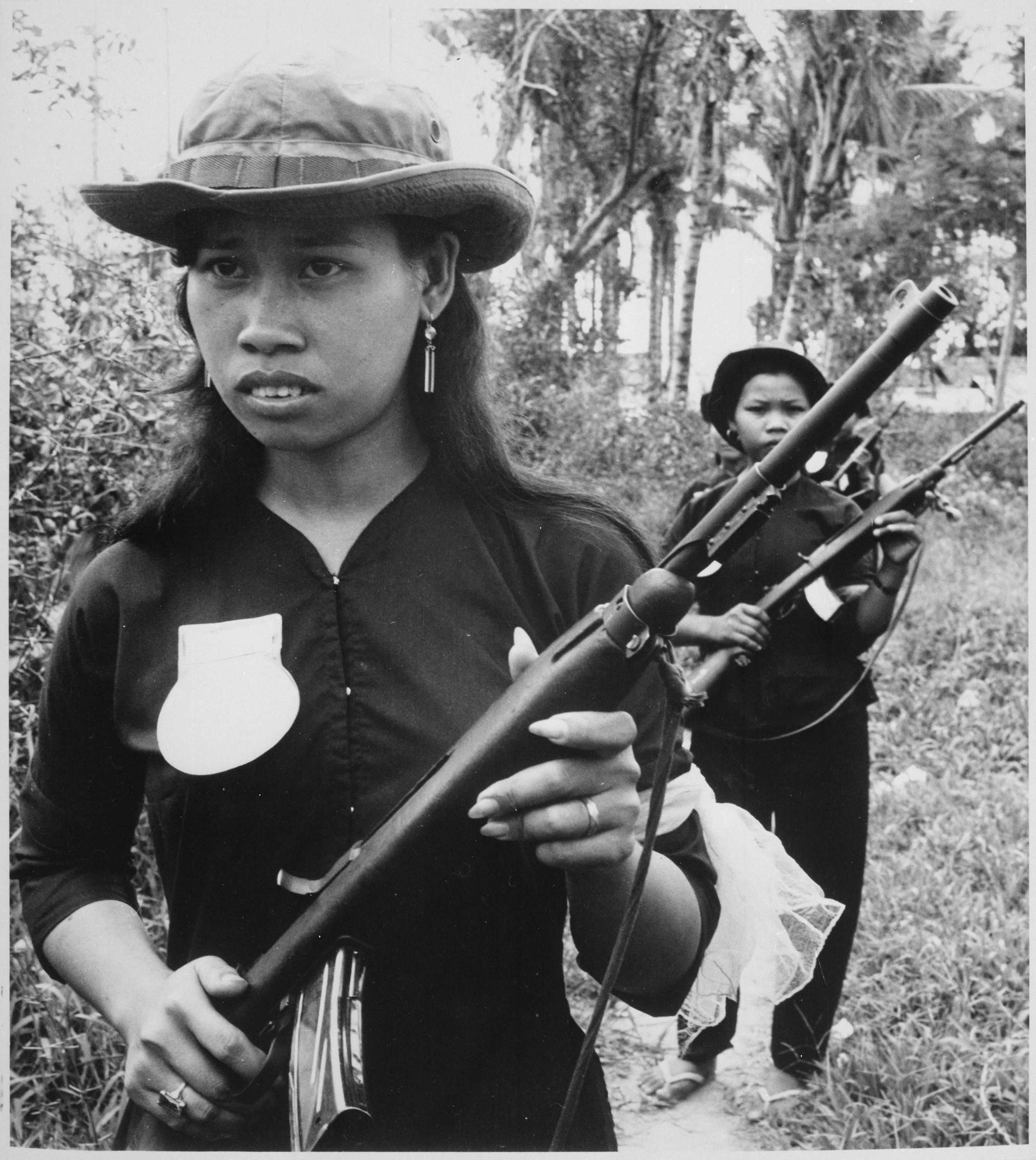
The local and regional militia forces were an important component of the pacification program to defeat the Viet Cong and provide security to villages.

CORDS at the Corps level (I, II, III, and IV Corps) had an organization similar to its headquarters organization in Saigon. A three-star general headed each corps with a deputy commander for CORDS, usually a civilian. Within each Corps, all 44 South Vietnamese provinces were headed by a native province chief, usually an ARVN army colonel, who was supported by an American province senior adviser, either military or a civilian. The province adviser's staff was divided into a civilian part which supervised area and community development and a military part which assisted the Vietnamese with security operations.

CORDS focused on U.S. support for Vietnamese efforts at pacification in three broad areas: security, centralized planning, and operations against the VC. Komer quickly increased the number of U.S. military advisers assigned to Mobile Advisory Teams advising the Regional and Popular forces (RF/PF) from 141 to 2,331. The advisers provided training and better weapons to the RF/PF and the South Vietnamese government expanded their numbers from 300,000 in 1967, to 517,400 in 1972. CORDS also facilitated the expansion of the National Police from 60,000 to 80,000 personnel. CORDS also placed emphasis on improving South Vietnam's support and implementation of the Chieu Hoi program (encouraging defectors from the VC and PAVN), rural development programs, and generating fewer refugees from the war and taking better care of those who had become refugees.

A major priority of CORDS was to destroy the VC's political and support infrastructure which extended into most villages of the country. The Phoenix Program was CORDS' most controversial activity. Seven hundred American advisers assisted the South Vietnamese government in identifying, capturing, trying, imprisoning and often executing members of the VC infrastructure. Between 1968 and 1972, the Phoenix program, according to CORDS statistics, neutralized 81,740 VC of whom 26,369 were killed. 87 percent of those deaths were attributed to conventional military operations by South Vietnam and the U.S.; the remainder were executed and, in the opinion of critics, were often innocent or non-combatants and were assassinated by "death squads."

== Tet and its aftermath ==
On January 24, 1968, Komer warned that "something is in the wind." Seven days later the Tet Offensive was launched by the VC and PAVN. Tet weakened the Saigon government's presence in the countryside, which had been aided by CORDS. The RF/PF abandoned the countryside in some areas to defend cities and towns, suffering more than 6,500 casualties, including desertions. Tet was a military victory but a psychological defeat for South Vietnam and its American ally, but heavy VC casualties facilitated an early return to the countryside by South Vietnamese authorities and CORDS. Project Recovery distributed food and construction material to rural dwellers and involved CORDS in reconstruction efforts in the cities and towns. By May 1968, the rural population living in "relatively secure" hamlets had returned to pre-Tet levels of 67 percent. Ambassador Ellsworth Bunker, CIA official William Colby, Komer's successor as head of CORDS and the new head of MACV, General Creighton Abrams, persuaded the South Vietnamese government to embark on an accelerated pacification program. The casualties suffered by the VC and the PAVN, during Tet and their subsequent offensives in 1968, enabled CORDS to strengthen its programs in the countryside.

== Evaluations of CORDS ==
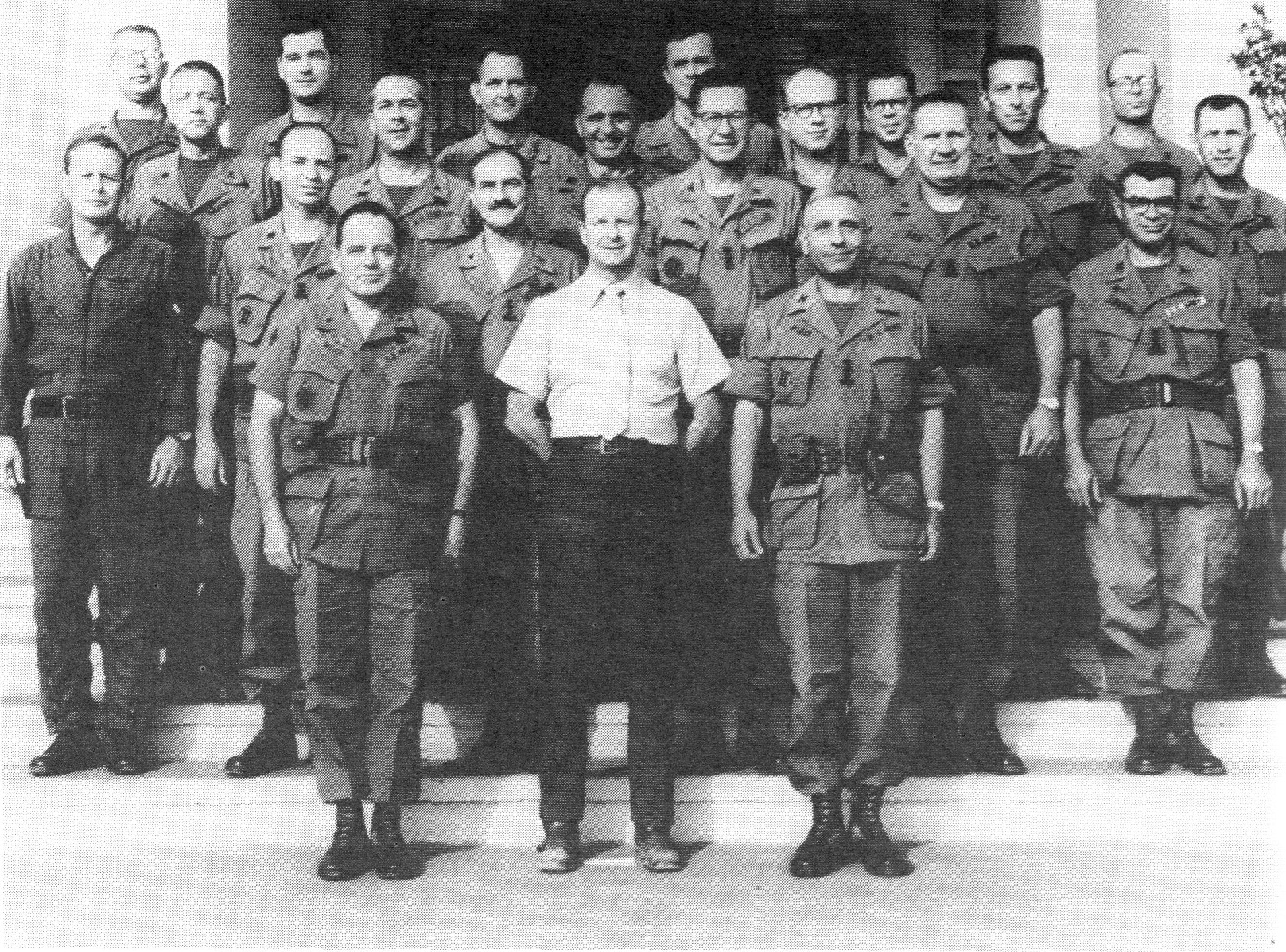
John Paul Vann (white shirt) and his CORDS staff at their Pleiku headquarters in 1971.

In February 1970, John Paul Vann, CORDS head in the IV Corps area (the Mekong River delta south of Saigon), gave an optimistic progress report about pacification to the United States Senate. According to Vann, in IV Corps a person could drive during daylight hours without armed escort to any of the 16 provincial capitals for the first time since 1961. Fewer than 800,000 people out of the six million people living in IV Corps were in contested or VC-controlled areas. 30,000 VC had defected under the Chieu Hoi program. In 1969, the number of refugees had declined from 220,000 to less than 35,000, and rice production had increased nearly 25 percent. Vann, a civilian after retiring from the army as a Lt. Colonel, had 234 American civilian and 2,138 military advisers under his command. More than 300,000 armed Vietnamese soldiers, militia and police in the Corps area were being advised and assisted by CORDS.

CORDS was designed to combat the peasant-based Maoist insurgency of the VC in South Vietnam. "One of the ironies of the Vietnam War is that the southern-rooted insurgency that prompted U.S. military intervention in the first place was significantly pacified – although by no means extirpated – by the time the last major U.S. ground combat forces departed South Vietnam." The years, after reverses during Tet, from 1969 until early 1972 saw "uninterrupted gains in population security throughout South Vietnam and further erosion of the VC. The VC had only a minor role in the 1972 and 1975 communist offensives, the latter resulting in the conquest of South Vietnam by the conventional military forces of North Vietnam.

With the war coming to rely more on the conventional military forces of South and North Vietnam, pacification under CORDS became less relevant. After the withdrawal from Vietnam of U.S. military forces and many civilian personnel, CORDS was terminated in February 1973.

CORDS was successful in several ways. The program successfully integrated U.S. military and civilian efforts to defeat the insurgency in South Vietnam. Communication and cooperation between the U.S. and South Vietnamese government improved; CORDS revitalized several earlier failed attempts at pacification; CORDS leaders Komer and Colby persuaded South Vietnam to take the offensive in rural areas after Tet to challenge the long primacy of the Viet Cong in many areas of the country; and CORDS had some impact of persuading the South Vietnamese government to replace corrupt and incompetent officials.

However, the CORDS pacification programs "could not overcome the South Vietnamese government's defective execution of plans and programs, its omnipresent corruption, or its inability to develop a sturdy, self-sustaining political base." In light of the outcome of the war, CORDS founder Komer attributed the eventual failure of pacification to "too little, too late". Richard Hunt concluded similarly in his book Pacification: The American Struggle for Vietnam's Hearts and Minds that "the advocates of pacification hoped it would cause a fundamental transformation of South Vietnam. But even if that transformation had occurred it would most likely have taken too long and would in any case have exhausted the patience of the American people, inevitably eroding political support in the United States."

== See also ==
- Phoenix Program
- Office of Rural Affairs (South Vietnam)
