= Mobile Advisory Teams =

- Active: October 1967 – 1972
- Country: United States
- Branch: United States Army
- Type: Military advisors
- Role: Counter-insurgency; Military education and training
- Part of: Military Assistance Command, Vietnam; United States Army Vietnam

The Mobile Advisory Teams (MATs) were small units of United States Army military advisors that operated during the Vietnam War. The teams provided training to the Army of the Republic of Vietnam (ARVN) territorial units: the Regional and Popular Forces.

== Background ==
With the exception of the United States Marine Corps Combined Action Program and a few other programs, neither on-the-job training nor the combined operations programs had any effect on the Regional and Popular Forces. Following the formation of Civil Operations and Revolutionary Development Support (CORDS) in April 1967 improving village security was identified as a crucial requirement for pacification. Up to 1968 the territorial forces had been without advisers and often Military Assistance Command, Vietnam (MACV) had little information on their condition and employment. With thousands of these units spread out over the country any effort to place permanent advisers with them would have been too costly in terms of U.S. manpower. In an effort to begin improving them, COMUSMACV General William Westmoreland was at first forced to rely heavily on the initiative of the Corps senior advisers and the U.S. resources available within each Corps tactical zone.

In 1967 all U.S. Corps headquarters initiated Regional and Popular Forces training programs utilizing mobile training teams composed of from three to ten members who rotated among local Regional and Popular units. Their mission varied from conducting one-day on-site training to five-week refresher training programs. The teams were given a number of military labels - combined mobile training teams, combined mobile improvement teams, "red-catcher" and "impact" teams and Regional Forces company training teams. However, these efforts proved too decentralized and uncoordinated to deal with what was an extremely difficult problem.

Encouraged by the limited progress that had been made. General Westmoreland directed a countrywide test of the Regional Forces company training team concept. Basically, the concept was similar to the Combined Action Program. In practice, a team of three company grade officers and three non-commissioned officers joined a Regional Forces company at an ARVN training center, assisted in training, and then accompanied the unit back to its home base for in-place training and operational missions. The team remained until the unit was capable of operating alone, usually six to nine months later. The team did not command the unit, but Regional Forces commanders were instructed to follow the team's directions. The Regional Forces company training team was in the business of training and supervising, not simply advising and thus had a more active role than that of the advisory learns. Team members were recognised combat leaders with about nine months left in the country and some command of the Vietnamese language. By the end of 1967, advisor reports did not reflect any significant improvement in the territorial forces. However, there was general agreement that the training team concept was valid and should be expanded. At a conference held on 26 October 1967, General Westmoreland recommended that some 354 new "advisory teams be created specifically to provide assistance to the Regional and Popular Forces. Other recommendations called for providing engineer and personnel advisers to each of the forty-four provinces.

What finally evolved were the mobile advisory team (MAT) and the mobile advisory logistics team (MALT). These teams formed the nucleus of a massive improvement program that addressed all aspects of the administration, logistical support, and tactical operations of the territorial units.

== Team composition ==
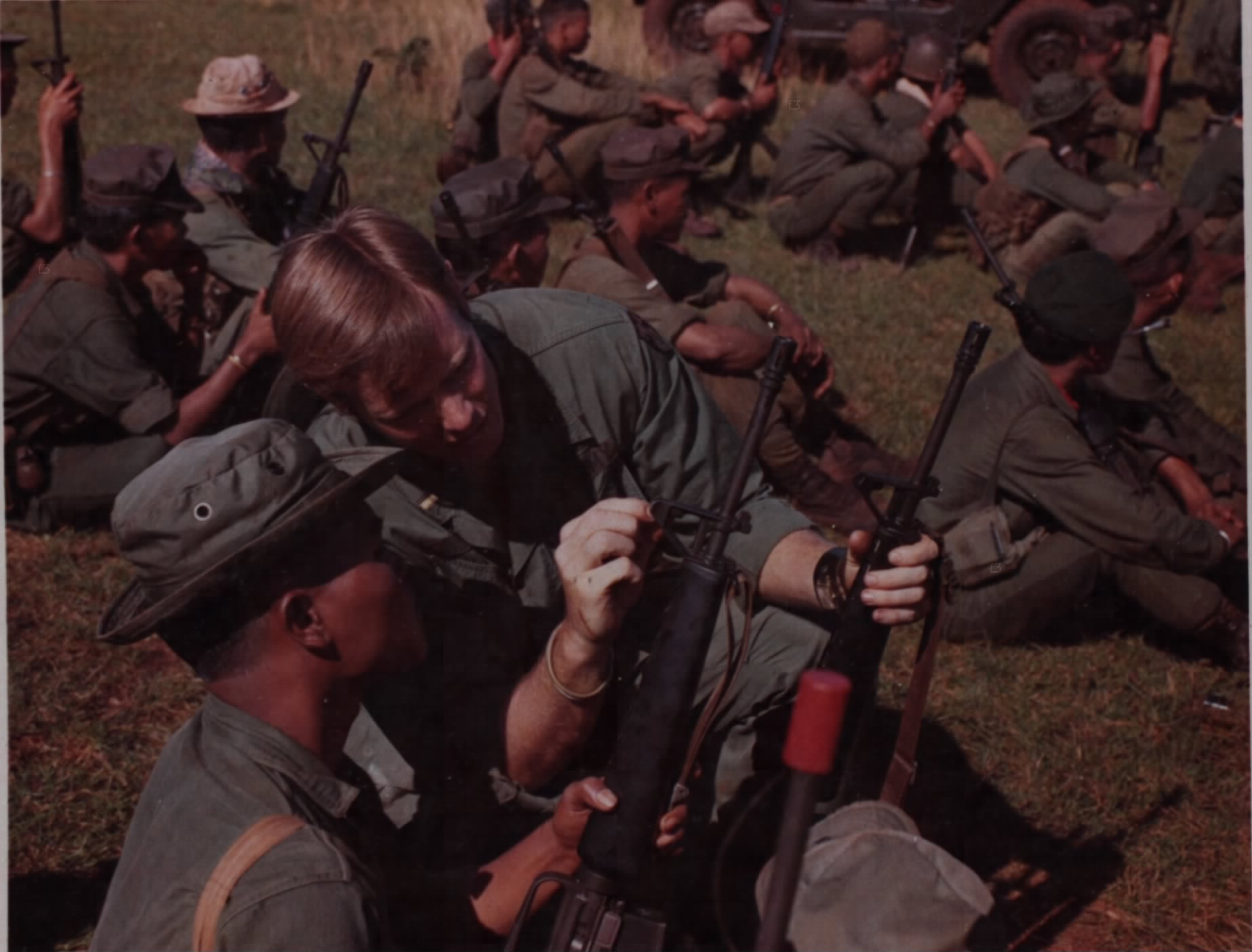
A member of Mobile Advisory Team 36 assists a Regional Force soldier to adjust the front sight of his M-16 rifle, October 1969

Each MAT consisted of two officers, three enlisted men and an ARVN interpreter. Their primary mission was to advise and instruct Regional Forces companies and Popular Forces platoons and Regional and Popular Forces group headquarters on field fortifications, barrier systems, indirect fire support and small unit operations with emphasis on night operations and ambushes, patrols, weapons employment, emergency medical care, and other topics related to Regional and Popular Forces missions. By the end of 1968 the MACV deployment goal had been met and the program was judged a success.

Two significant changes were later made in the program centering around personnel procurement. Initially, personnel were drawn from individuals in U.S. units who still had at least six months remaining in South Vietnam. In early 1969 however, MAT members were assigned directly from the continental United States personnel stream to a specific MAT for a one-year tour. Tour stability was important and advisers could often pick up more experience in one or two months in their advisory capacity than by serving six with a U.S. unit. In order to be better prepared for the assignment, advisers attended a new adviser school established by the United States Army Vietnam (USARV), at Dĩ An Base Camp. Some advisers received training at Ft. Bragg's Center for Special Warfare concentrating on MAT team specifics and Vietnamese language training by native speakers at the Defense Language Institute, Southwest located at Biggs Field, Ft. Bliss in El Paso, Texas. In order to make mobile advisory team duty more desirable, the second change stipulated that the team leader and his assistant would receive command credit for their duty.

The MAT concept was hailed as the turning point in improving the effectiveness of the territorial forces and the program was continually strengthened during the years that followed. The detailed structure changed from time to time, but in general the teams remained small close-knit groups with new company grade officers, a light weapons non-commissioned officer, a radiotelephone operator and an interpreter. Although the MATs initially concentrated on working with Regional Forces companies, later they operated with the smaller Popular Forces platoons, and in the end they became extensions of first the province and then the district advisory teams. The MATs remained mobile, however, and were transferred to other areas whenever necessary.

MATs were numbered with a Roman numeral referring to one of South Vietnam's four corps regions where the team operated: I, II, III or IV and a second number being the team's number within the corps.

The MALT program complemented the MATS and placed major emphasis on improving the administrative and logistic support procedures of the Regional and Popular Forces. The MALTs’ missions were to provide on the spot administrative, supply, and logistics training and assistance to Regional and Popular Forces units and their direct support logistical companies and depots. As was the case with the MATS, initial personnel resources were detailed from USARV resources and later replacements were obtained through normal MACV channels. The MALTs proved to be an effective means of improving the administrative and logistical function of the territorial forces and contributed to their high morale and increased material independence.

The MAT school at Dĩ An closed its doors in September 1971, and by the end of 1971 the number of MATs working with the territorial forces had shrunk from 487 to 66.

== See also ==
- Australian Army Training Team Vietnam
