= Dĩ An (city) =

- Provincial city (Class-2)
- Dĩ An City; Thành phố Dĩ An
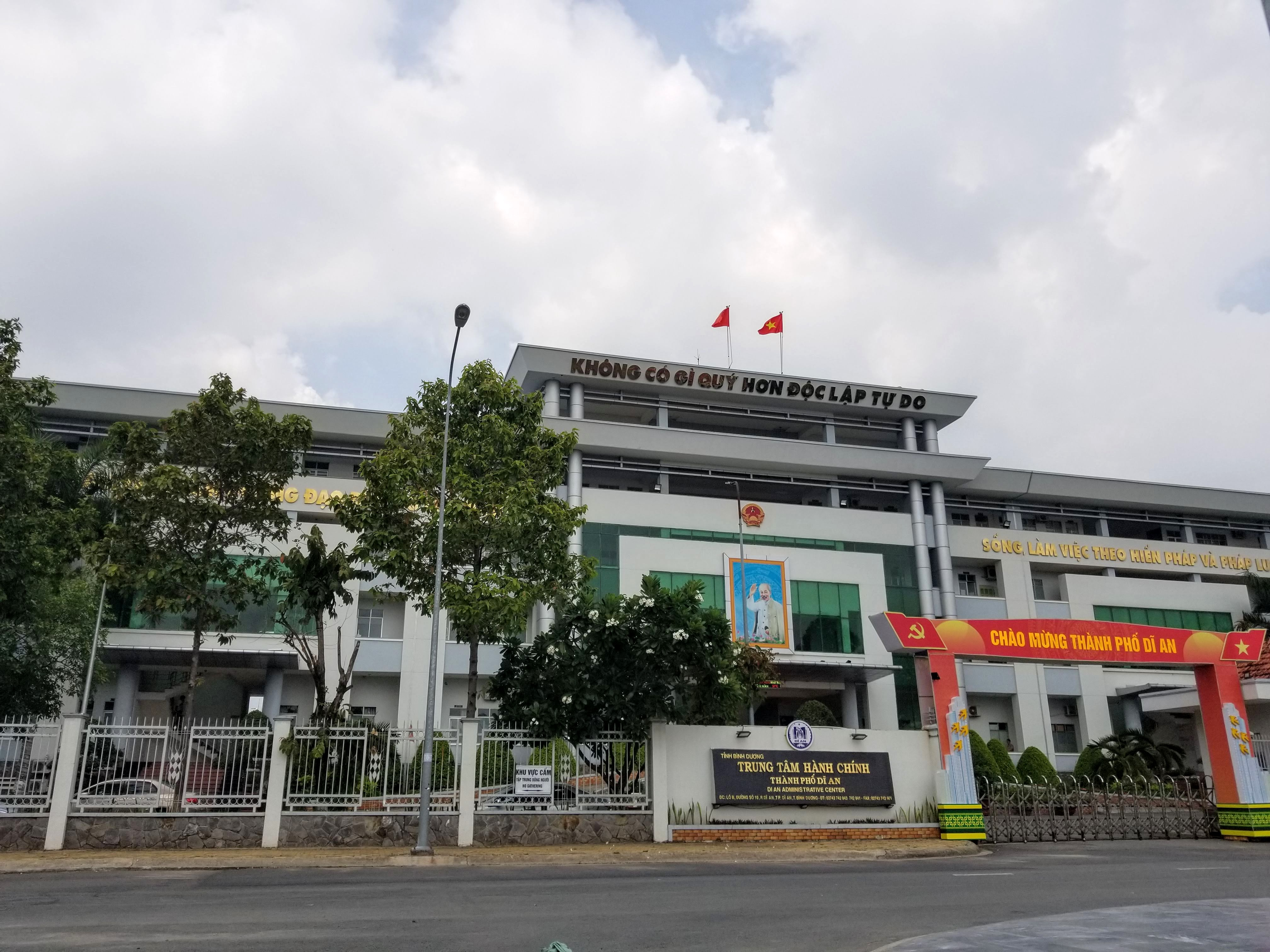
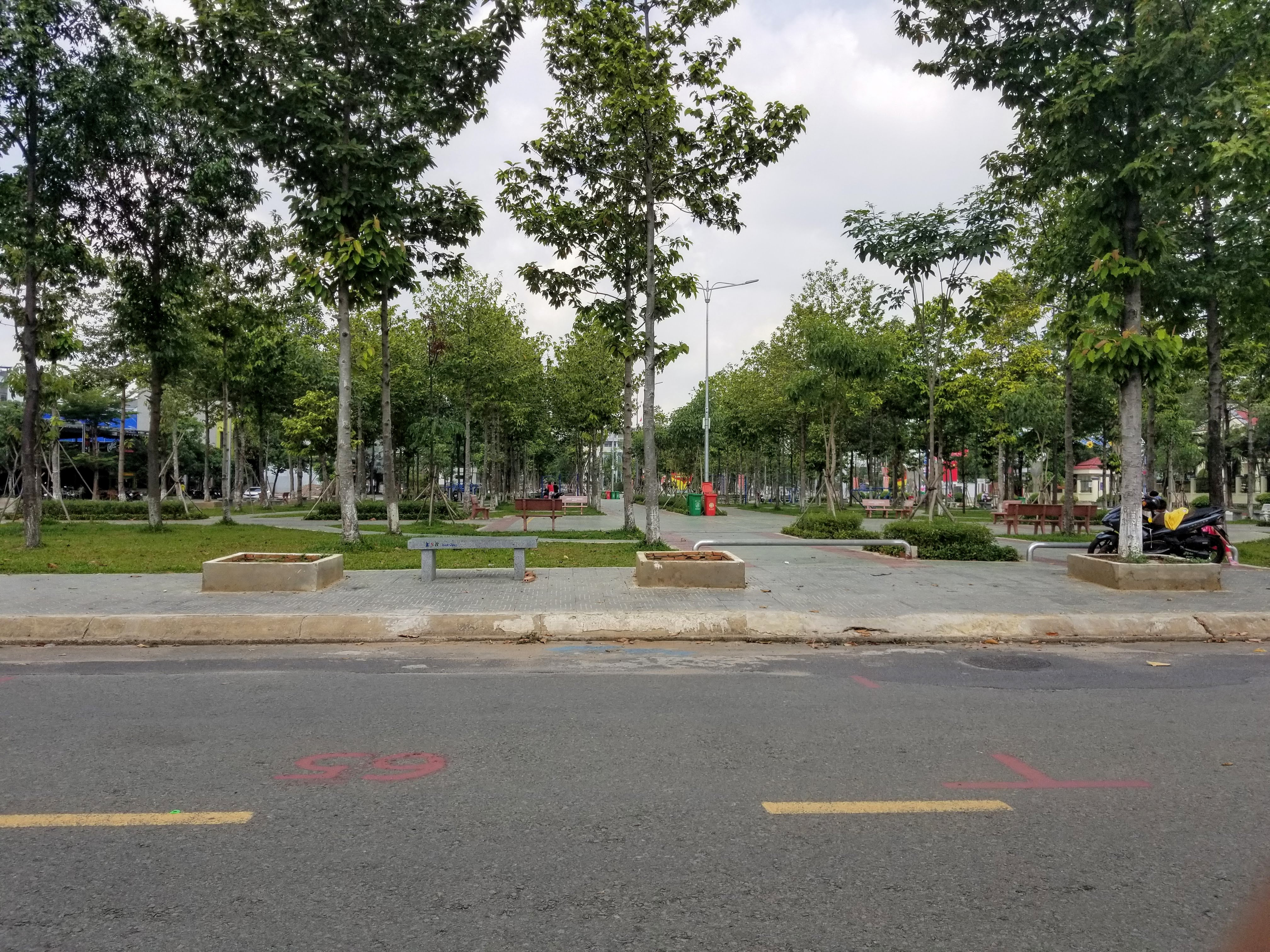
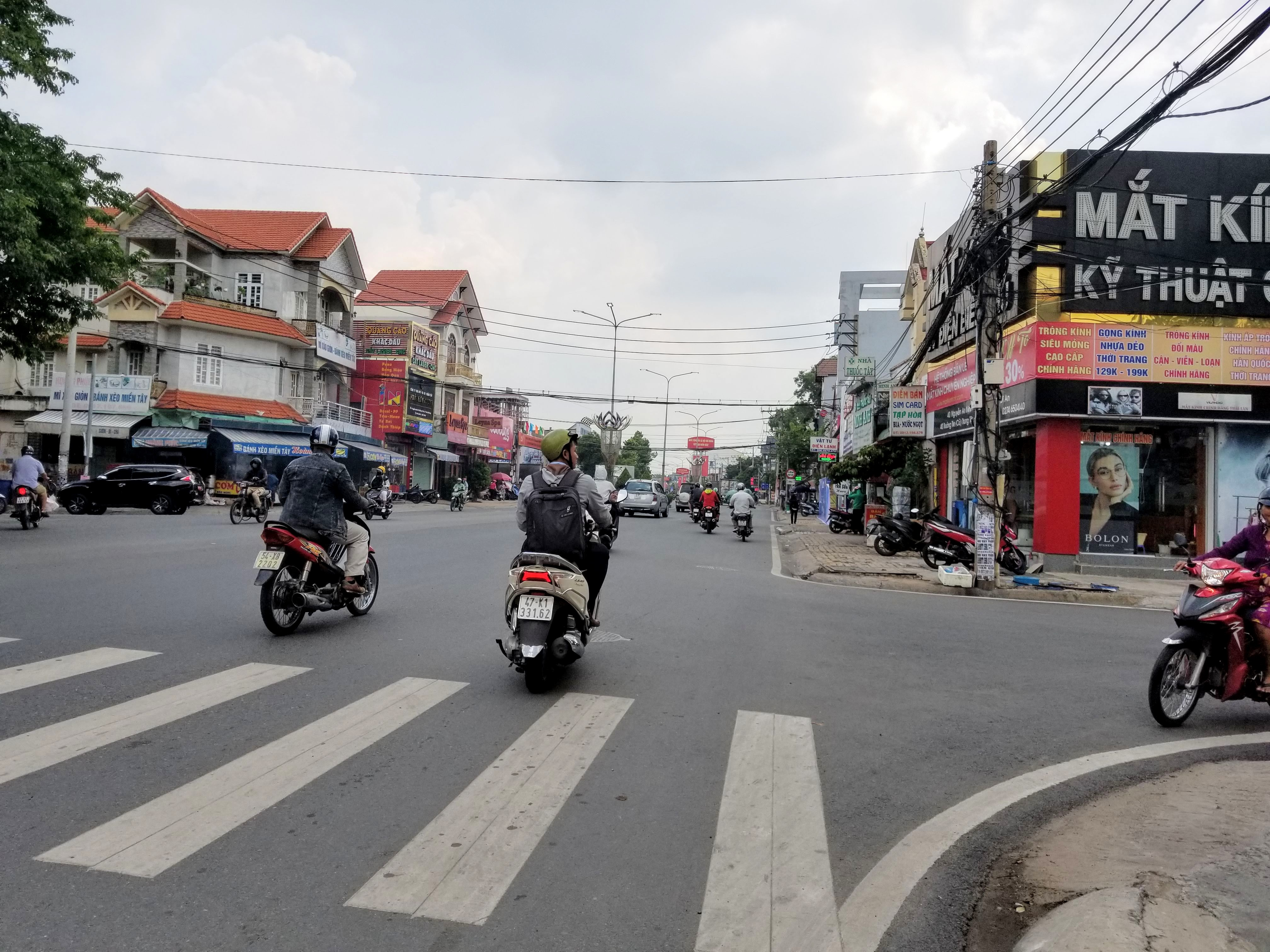
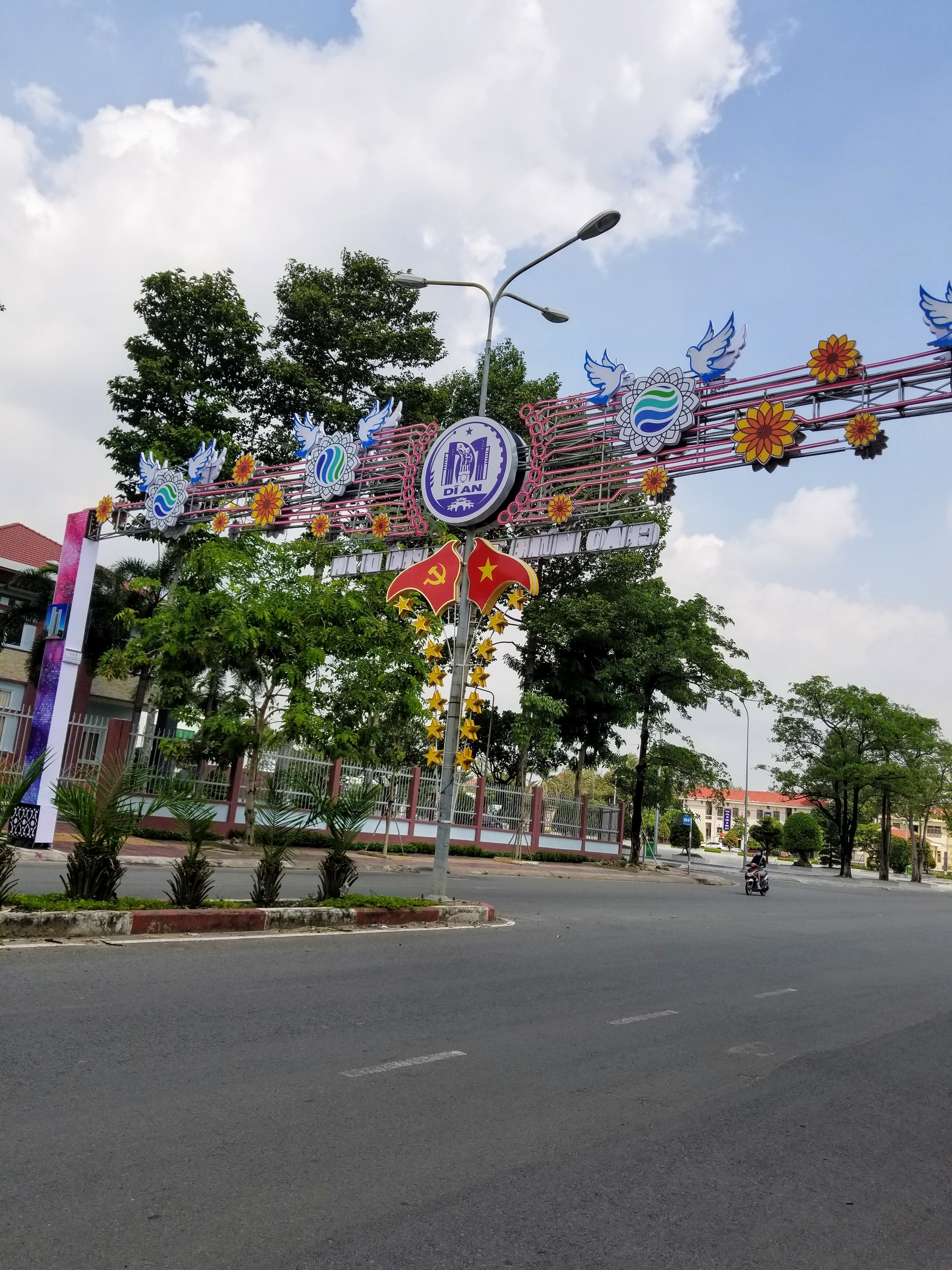
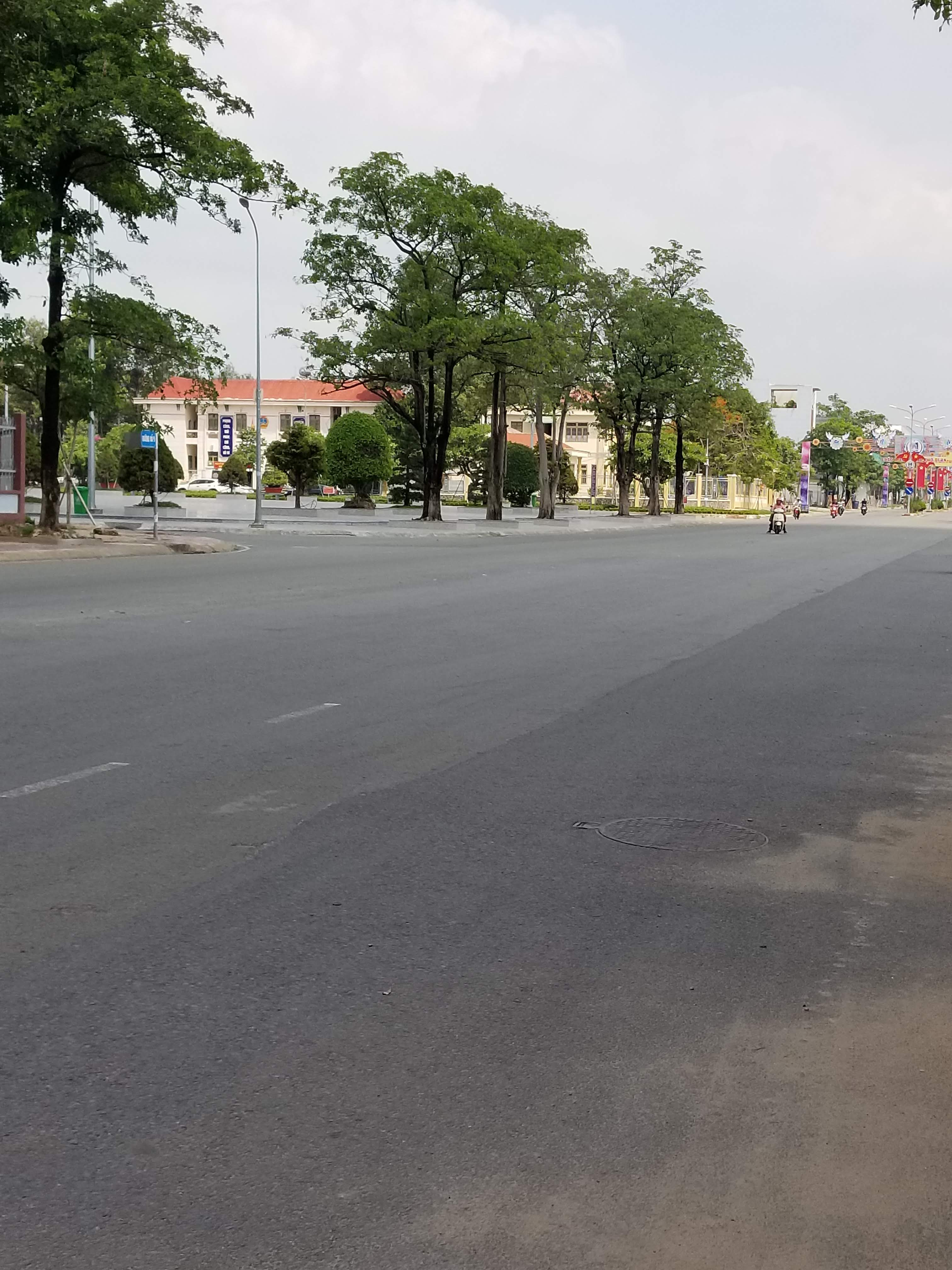

- Seal
- Interactive map of Dĩ An
- Location of in Vietnam
- Coordinates: 10°54′14″N 106°46′4″E
- Country: Vietnam
- Province: Bình Dương
- Founded: January 13, 2011: established Di An town; February 1, 2020: established Di An city

Government
  - Chairman of the People's Committee: Lê Thành Tài
  - Chairman of the People's Council: Ngô Ngọc Điệp

Area
  - Total: 60.05 km^{2} (23.19 sq mi)

Population (2021)
  - Total: 463,023
  - Density: 7,711/km^{2} (19,970/sq mi)
- Time zone: UTC+7 (Indochina Time)
- Website: dian.binhduong.gov.vn

Dĩ An is a former city of Bình Dương Province in the Southeast region of Vietnam, about 20 km north of central Ho Chi Minh City (formerly Saigon). It is 1,706 km by rail from Hanoi. At the 2009 census the city had a population of 73,859. The town covers 60 km^{2} (23 sq mi).

Dĩ An consists of seven wards: Dĩ An, An Bình, Bình An, Bình Thắng, Đông Hòa, Tân Bình and Tân Đông Hiệp.

== Transport ==
The city is the proposed junction for the Trans-Asian Railway that would connect half a dozen railways in southeast Asia, starting with Cambodia. This line would cross the Cambodian border near Lộc Ninh.

Dĩ An is an important destination of the national railway with two railway stations: Dĩ An and Sóng Thần. The area's tram factory is the largest in South Vietnam. Dĩ An was also the headquarters for the American 1st Infantry Division (nicknamed "The Big Red One") during the Vietnam War. Later in 1969 and 1970 the 1st Infantry Division was withdrawn to the US, and The 11th Armored Cavalry Regiment was there until 1972. It also houses the largest bus station in Vietnam, New Eastern Bus Station.

== See also ==
- Transport in Vietnam
