= Thuận An, Ho Chi Minh City =

Thuận An Phường Thuận An Búng, An Thạnh, Hưng Định, An Sơn
- Ward
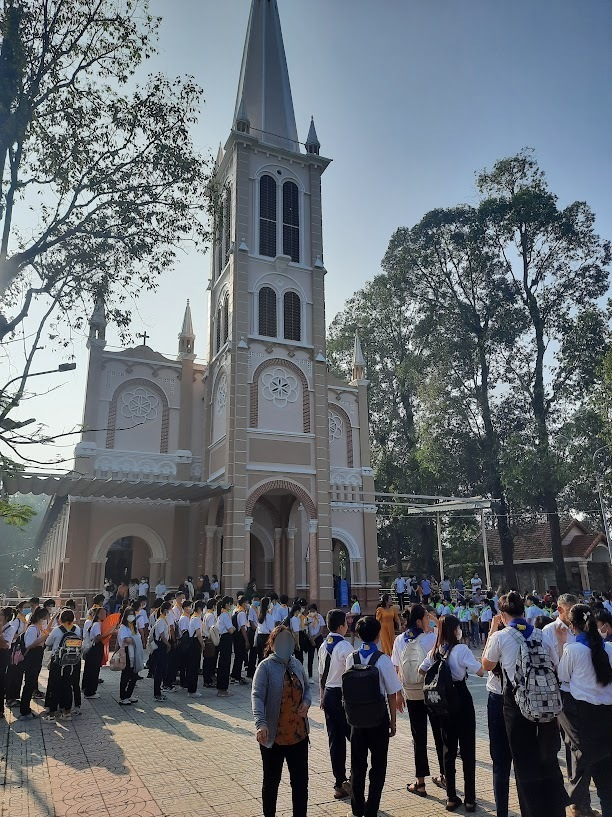
- Búng Church
- Interactive map of Thuận An
- Coordinates: 10°56′44.8″N 106°41′23.6″E
- Country: Vietnam
- Municipality: Ho Chi Minh City
- Established: June 16, 2025

Area
  - Total: 6.22 sq mi (16.11 km^{2})

Population (2024)
  - Total: 64,689
  - Density: 10,400/sq mi (4,015/km^{2})
- Time zone: UTC+07:00 (Indochina Time)
- Administrative code: 25978

Thuận An (Vietnamese: Phường Thuận An) is a ward of Ho Chi Minh City, Vietnam. It is one of the 168 new wards, communes and special zones of the city following the reorganization in 2025.

== Geography ==
According to Official Dispatch No. 2896/BNV-CQĐP dated May 27, 2025 of the Ministry of Home Affairs, following the merger, Thuận An has a land area of 16.11 km², the population as of December 31, 2024 is 64,689 people, the population density is 4,015 people/km².

== History ==
On June 16, 2025, the National Assembly Standing Committee issued Resolution No. 1685/NQ-UBTVQH15 on the arrangement of commune-level administrative units of Ho Chi Minh City in 2025 (effective from June 16, 2025). Accordingly, the entire land area and population of Hưng Định, An Thạnh wards and An Sơn commune of the former Thuận An city will be integrated into a new ward named Thuận An (Clause 85, Article 1).
