= Bình Chuẩn =

- Commune
- Rural landscape in Bình Chuẩn commune
- Country: Vietnam
- Region: North Central Coast
- Province: Nghệ An

Area
  - Total: 182.19 km^{2} (70.34 sq mi)

Population (2025)
  - Total: 4,638
  - Density: 25/km^{2} (65/sq mi)

Bình Chuẩn is a commune in Nghệ An province, Vietnam.

Bình Chuẩn commune has an area of 182.19 km² and a population of 4,638 as of 2025. Unlike most commune-level administrative units in Nghệ An province, Bình Chuẩn was not subject to an administrative merger during the 2025 reorganization. It was one of nine communes in the province that were retained without alteration.
