= Thuận Giao =

Thuận Giao Phường Thuận Giao Bình Thuận, Bình Giao, Bình Chuẩn
- Ward
- Interactive map of Thuận Giao
- Coordinates: 10°57′15.5″N 106°42′12.7″E
- Country: Vietnam
- Municipality: Ho Chi Minh City
- Established: June 16, 2025

Area
  - Total: 6.49 sq mi (16.81 km^{2})

Population (2024)
  - Total: 150,781
  - Density: 23,230/sq mi (8,970/km^{2})
- Time zone: UTC+07:00 (Indochina Time)
- Administrative code: 25969

Thuận Giao (Vietnamese: Phường Thuận Giao) is a ward of Ho Chi Minh City, Vietnam. It is one of the 168 new wards, communes and special zones of the city following the reorganization in 2025.

== History ==
On June 16, 2025, the National Assembly Standing Committee issued Resolution No. 1685/NQ-UBTVQH15 on the arrangement of commune-level administrative units of Ho Chi Minh City in 2025 (effective from June 16, 2025). Accordingly, the entire land area and population of Thuận Giao ward and part of Bình Chuẩn ward of the former Thuận An city will be integrated into a new ward named Thuận Giao (Clause 86, Article 1).
