= Thuận An (city) =

- Provincial city (Class-3)
- Thuận An City; Thành phố Thuận An
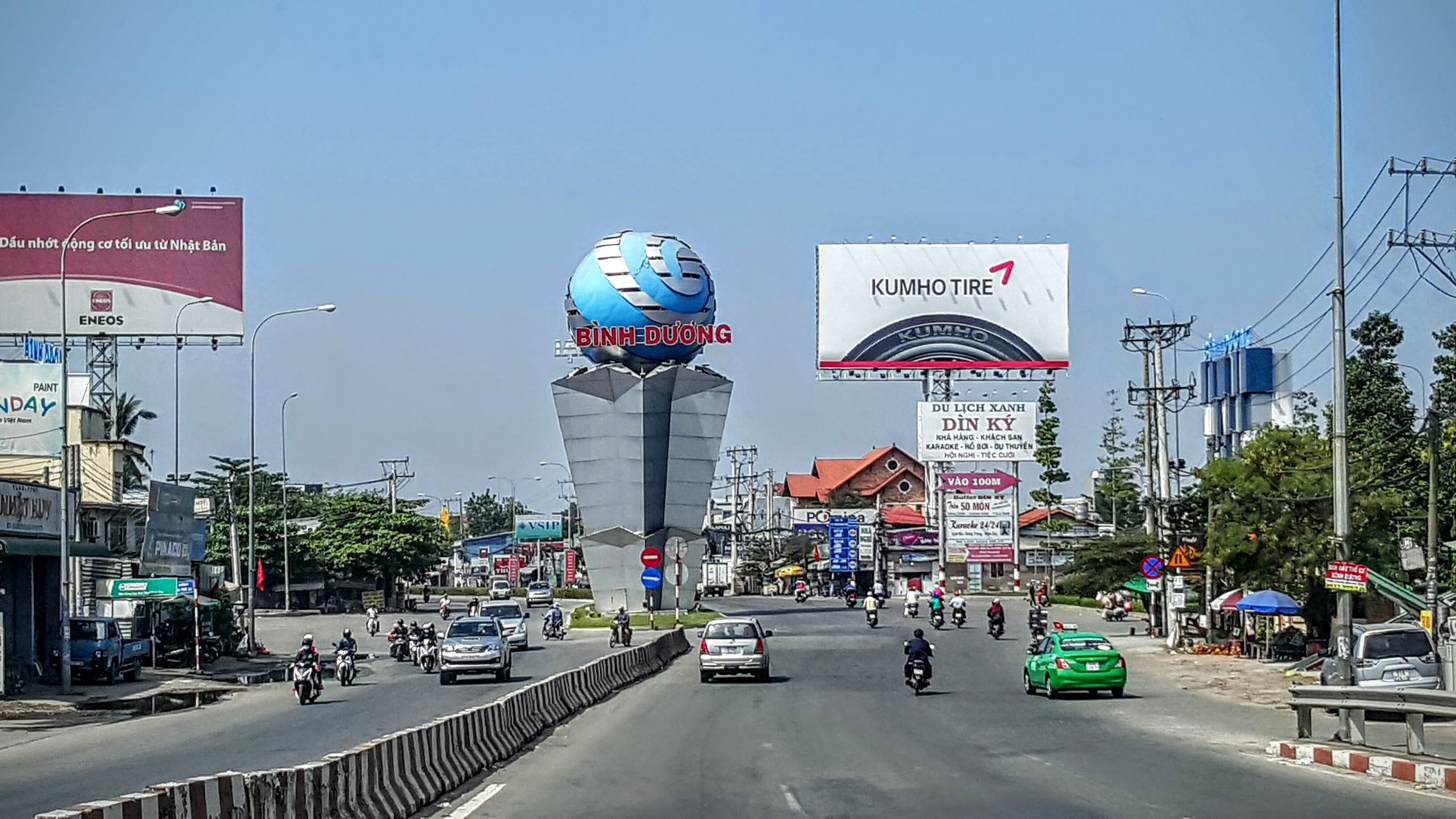
- Street scene in Thuận An

- Location within Vietnam
- Coordinates: 10°54′18″N 106°41′58″E
- Country: Vietnam
- Region: Southeast
- Province: Bình Dương
- Established: 03/11/1977 (established rural district) 01/13/2011 (established town)

Area
  - Total: 32.31 sq mi (83.69 km^{2})

Population (2021)
  - Total: 618,984
  - Density: 19,150/sq mi (7,394/km^{2})
- Time zone: UTC+7 (Indochina Time)
- Postcode: 725
- Website: http://thuanan.binhduong.gov.vn

Thuận An is a former city of Bình Dương province in the Southeast region of Vietnam. It is situated about 18 kilometres (11 mi) northeast of the centre of Ho Chi Minh City. As of November 3, 2021, the city had a population of 618,984. Thuận An covers an area of 83.7 km^{2}. The city's town centre, Lái Thiêu, is famous for its ceramic and fruit products.

== Administrative divisions ==
Thuận An has nine wards (Lái Thiêu, An Thạnh, Vĩnh Phú, Bình Hòa, Bình Chuẩn, Thuận Giao, An Phú, Hưng Định and Bình Nhâm) and one rural commune (An Sơn).

== Geography ==
Thuận An borders Dĩ An to the east, Thủ Dầu Một to the north. District 12, Ho Chi Minh City to the west and Thủ Đức to the south.
