= Tân Đông Hiệp =

Tân Đông Hiệp Phường Tân Đông Hiệp Tân Bình, Tân Ba
- Ward
- Interactive map of Tân Đông Hiệp
- Coordinates: 10°55′06.3″N 106°46′08.5″E
- Country: Vietnam
- Municipality: Ho Chi Minh City
- Established: June 16, 2025

Area
  - Total: 8.29 sq mi (21.47 km^{2})

Population (2024)
  - Total: 100,243
  - Density: 12,090/sq mi (4,669/km^{2})
- Time zone: UTC+07:00 (Indochina Time)
- Administrative code: 25945

Tân Đông Hiệp (Vietnamese: Phường Tân Đông Hiệp) is a ward of Ho Chi Minh City, Vietnam. It is one of the 168 new wards, communes and special zones of the city following the reorganization in 2025.

== History ==
On June 16, 2025, the National Assembly Standing Committee issued Resolution No. 1685/NQ-UBTVQH15 on the arrangement of commune-level administrative units of Ho Chi Minh City in 2025 (effective from June 16, 2025). Accordingly, the entire land area and population of Tân Bình ward, part of Tân Đông Hiệp ward of the former Dĩ An city and part of Thái Hòa ward of the former Tân Uyên city will be integrated into a new ward named Tân Đông Hiệp (Clause 81, Article 1).

== Notable people ==
- Lê Hoàng Quân
- Lê Hồng Phương
- Võ Văn Minh
