= An Phú, Ho Chi Minh City =

An Phú Phường An Phú Tuy An, Vĩnh Phú
- Ward
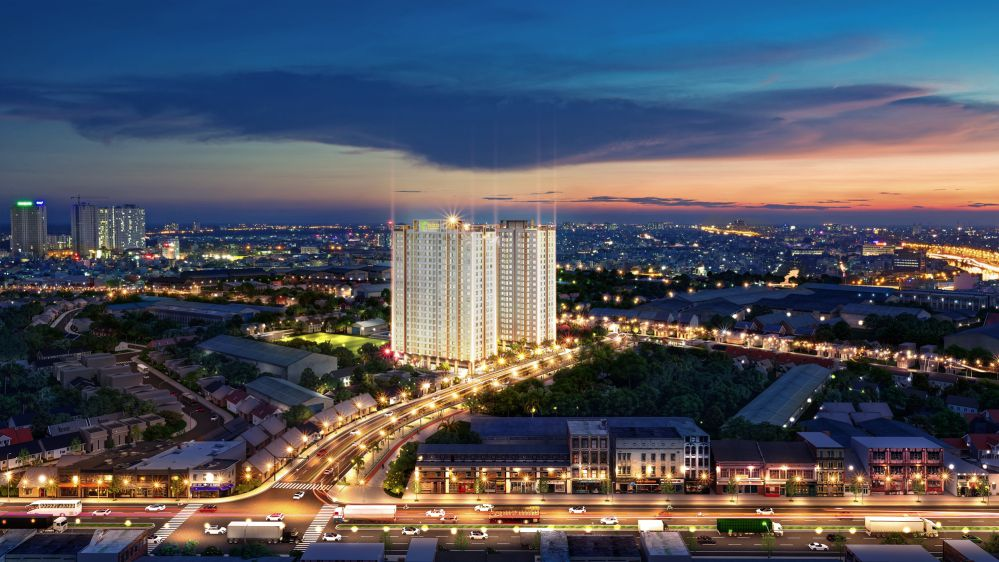
- Skyline of An Phú
- Interactive map of An Phú
- Coordinates: 10°56′53″N 106°44′15″E
- Country: Vietnam
- Municipality: Ho Chi Minh City
- Established: June 16, 2025

Area
  - Total: 6.51 sq mi (16.85 km^{2})

Population (2024)
  - Total: 162,930
  - Density: 25,040/sq mi (9,669/km^{2})
- Time zone: UTC+07:00 (Indochina Time)
- Administrative code: 25975

An Phú (Vietnamese: Phường An Phú) is a ward of Ho Chi Minh City, Vietnam. It is one of the 168 new wards, communes and special zones of the city following the reorganization in 2025.

== History ==
On June 16, 2025, the National Assembly Standing Committee issued Resolution No. 1685/NQ-UBTVQH15 on the arrangement of commune-level administrative units of Ho Chi Minh City in 2025 (effective from June 16, 2025). Accordingly, the entire land area and population of An Phú ward and part of Bình Chuẩn ward of the former Thuận An city will be integrated into a new ward named An Phú (Clause 82, Article 1).
