= Bình Hòa, Ho Chi Minh City =

Bình Hòa Phường Bình Hòa Bình Đức, Bình Đáng, Đồng An, Vĩnh Phú
- Ward
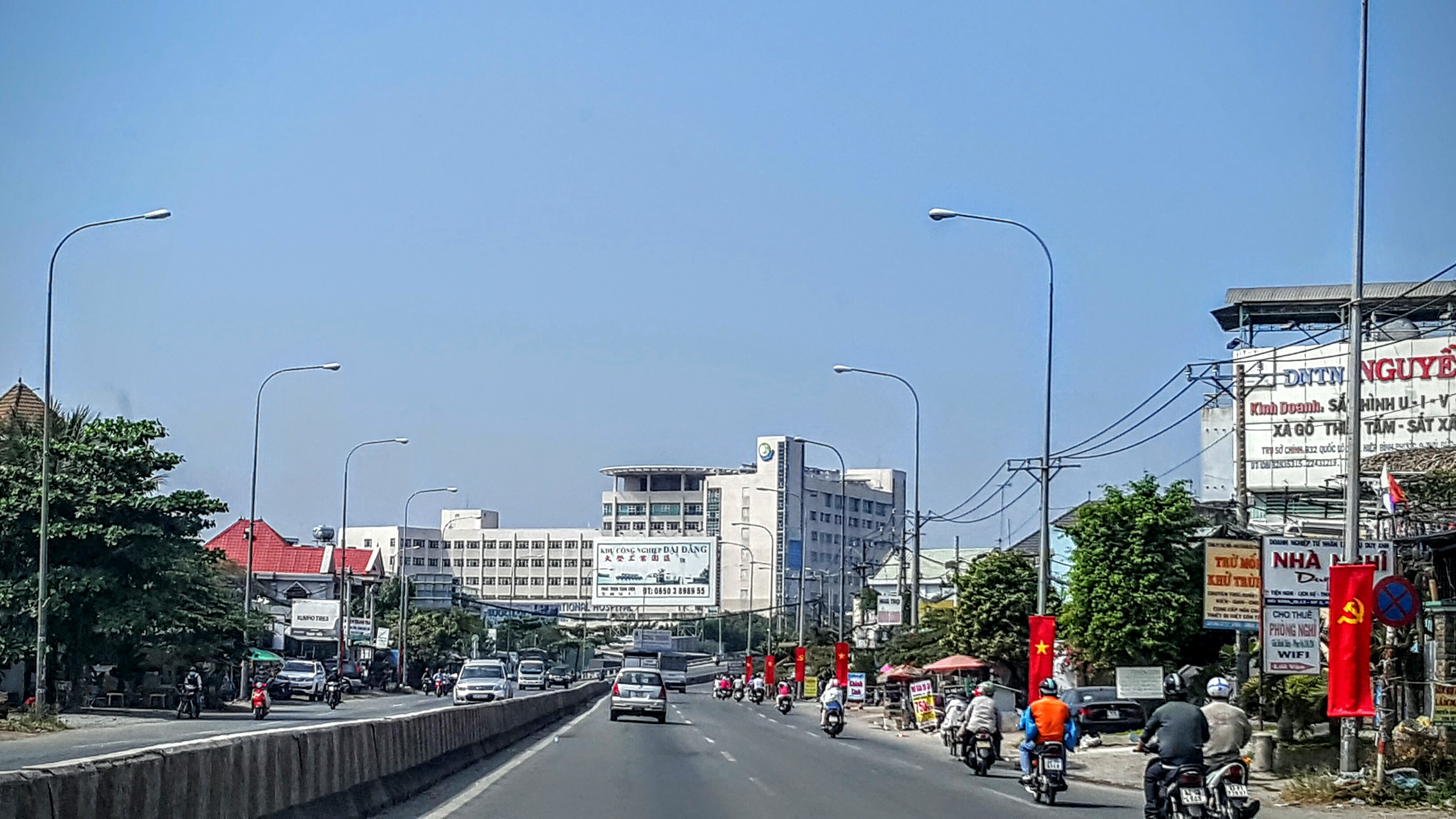
- Hạnh Phúc International Hospital on National Route 13, viewed from Hiệp Bình
- Interactive map of Bình Hòa
- Coordinates: 10°54′22″N 106°43′51″E
- Country: Vietnam
- Municipality: Ho Chi Minh City
- Established: June 16, 2025

Area
  - Total: 7.14 sq mi (18.49 km^{2})

Population (2024)
  - Total: 120,035
  - Density: 16,810/sq mi (6,492/km^{2})
- Time zone: UTC+07:00 (Indochina Time)
- Administrative code: 25987

Bình Hòa (Vietnamese: Phường Bình Hòa) is a ward of Ho Chi Minh City, Vietnam. It is one of the 168 new wards, communes and special zones of the city following the reorganization in 2025.

== Administrative divisions ==
Bình Hòa is divided into 8 neighborhoods: Bình Đức 1, Bình Đức 2, Bình Đức 3, Bình Đáng, Đồng An 1, Đồng An 2, Đồng An 3, Đông Ba.

== History ==
On June 16, 2025, the National Assembly Standing Committee issued Resolution No. 1685/NQ-UBTVQH15 on the arrangement of commune-level administrative units of Ho Chi Minh City in 2025 (effective from June 16, 2025). Accordingly, the entire land area and population of Bình Hòa ward and part of Vĩnh Phú ward of the former Thuận An city will be integrated into a new ward named Bình Hòa (Clause 83, Article 1).
