= Bình Dương, Ho Chi Minh City =

Ward of Thủ Dầu Một in Bình Dương Province, Vietnam

Bình Dương Phường Bình Dương New City (Thành phố mới)
- Ward
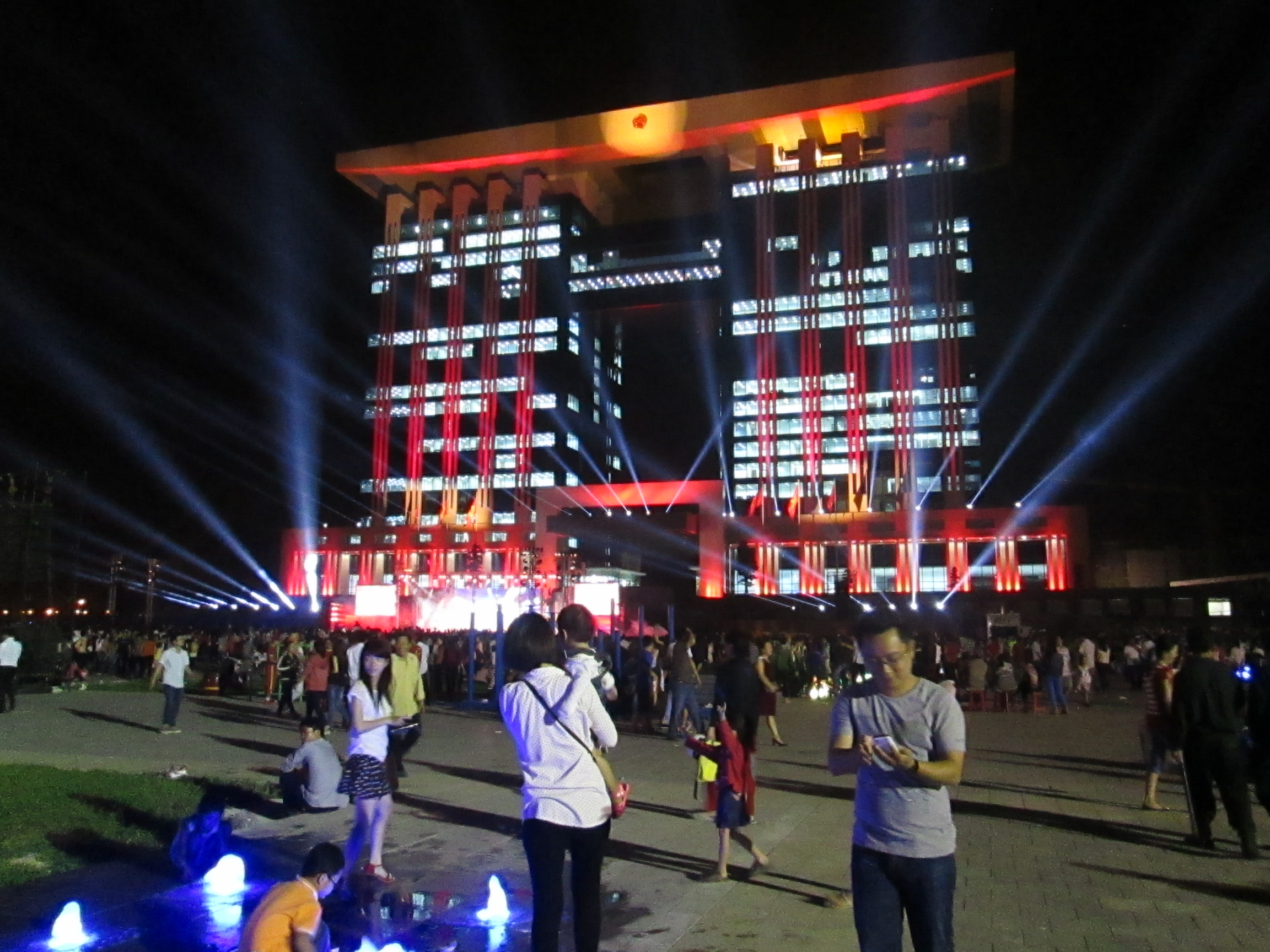
- Bình Dương Administration Center and the square nearby

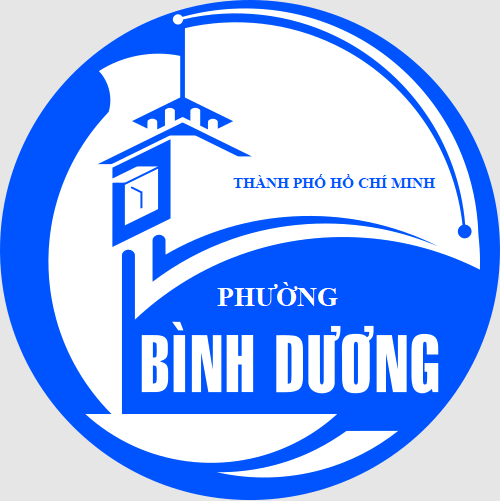
- Logo
- Interactive map of Bình Dương
- Coordinates: 11°03′37″N 106°41′17″E
- Country: Vietnam
- Municipality: Ho Chi Minh City
- Established: June 16, 2025

Area
  - Total: 22.46 sq mi (58.16 km^{2})

Population (2024)
  - Total: 107,576
  - Density: 4,791/sq mi (1,850/km^{2})
- Time zone: UTC+07:00 (Indochina Time)
- Administrative code: 25760

Bình Dương (Vietnamese: Phường Bình Dương) is a ward of Ho Chi Minh City, Vietnam. It is one of the 168 new wards, communes and special zones of the city following the reorganization in 2025.

The ward is the central business district and administrative centre of the former Bình Dương province and located in a planned community known as Bình Dương New City (Thành phố mới Bình Dương) or shortly as New City by local, which served as a "new downtown" of the former province, while the "old downtown" was in Phú Cường.

== Geography ==
Bình Dương ward located in northern Ho Chi Minh City, about 8 km and 30 km away to the north of Thủ Dầu Một and Sài Gòn, respectively. This ward is part of the central Bình Dương Region (also known as Region 2) of Ho Chi Minh City and adjacent to:

- Hòa Lợi to the north
- Vĩnh Tân, Tân Hiệp and Tân Khánh to the west
- Phú Lợi to the south
- Chánh Hiệp to the southeast.

According to Official Dispatch No. 2896/BNV-CQĐP dated May 27, 2025 of the Ministry of Home Affairs, following the merger, Thủ Dầu Một ward has a land area of 58.157 km², the population is 107,576 people, the population density is 1,849 người/km² (statistical data as of December 31, 2024, in accordance with Article 6 of Resolution No. 76/2025/UBTVQH15 dated April 14, 2025, of the National Assembly Standing Committee).

== History ==
In June 2009, the People's Committee of Binh Dương Province approved the detailed construction plan (at a 1:500 scale) under Decision No. 2273/QĐ-UBND. In July 2009, Becamex IDC was granted the land use rights certificate by the provincial People's Committee to implement the new urban area project—part of the larger Integrated Complex—under Decision No. 2717/QĐ-UBND. The groundbreaking ceremony for Bình Dương New City was held on April 26, 2010.

The Bình Dương New City project is developed by the Industrial Investment and Development Corporation (Becamex IDC). According to the master plan, the new urban area is located approximately 8 km from the center of Thủ Dầu Một City; it covers a total area of over 709 hectares and spans the wards of Hòa Phú, Định Hòa, Phú Tân within the city of Thủ Dầu Một.

On June 16, 2025, the National Assembly Standing Committee issued Resolution No. 1685/NQ-UBTVQH15 on the arrangement of commune-level administrative units of Ho Chi Minh City in 2025 (effective from June 16, 2025). Accordingly, the entire land area and population of Phú Mỹ, Hòa Phú, Phú Tân wards of the former Thủ Dầu Một city and Phú Chánh ward of the former Tân Uyên city will be integrated into a new ward named Bình Dương (Clause 90, Article 1).

== Administration ==
Bình Dương has 20 quarters: Chánh Long, Hòa Phú 1, Hòa Phú 2, Hòa Phú 3, Hòa Phú 4, Hòa Phú 5, Phú Bưng, Phú Chánh, Phú Mỹ 1, Phú Mỹ 2, Phú Mỹ 3, Phú Mỹ 4, Phú Mỹ 5, Phú Mỹ 6, Phú Mỹ 7, Phú Mỹ 8, Phú Tân 1, Phú Tân 2, Phú Tân 3, Phú Trung.

The quarters the ward are named by combining the place names of the former ward-level administrative units with sequential numbers, corresponding to the numbered quarters of those former wards.

== Bình Dương New City ==
Bình Dương New City is the name of an urban development project within the Bình Dương Industrial — Service — Urban Complex. The development was built entirely from scratch without using state budget funds with the Investment and Industrial Development Joint Stock Corporation (Becamex IDC) acting as the project developer. According to the master plan, the new urban area is located approximately 8 km from the center of Thủ Dầu Một, covers a total area of over 709 hectares, and is situated within Bình Dương and Chánh Hiệp wards of Ho Chi Minh City.

=== Urban and service facilities ===
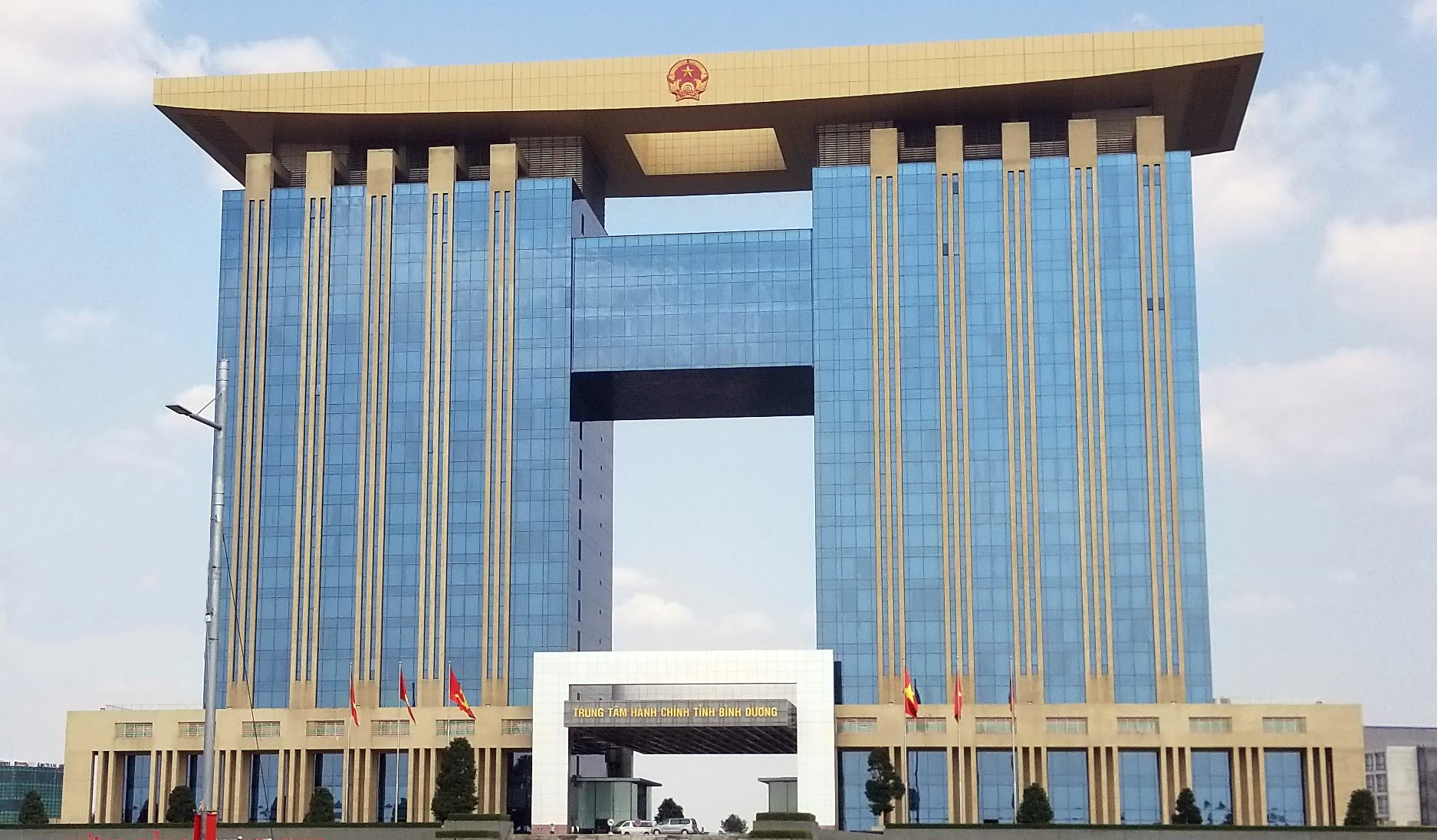
Bình Dương Administrative Centre

According to the master plan, Bình Dương New City comprises the following seven zones:

1. Administrative centre
2. High-tech park
3. Financial, banking, and securities hub
4. Office complexes and high-end hotels and restaurants
5. International convention and exhibition center and university campus
6. Community-oriented areas such as public squares, parks, ecological lakes, cultural centers, kindergartens, and hospitals
7. Technical infrastructure facilities...

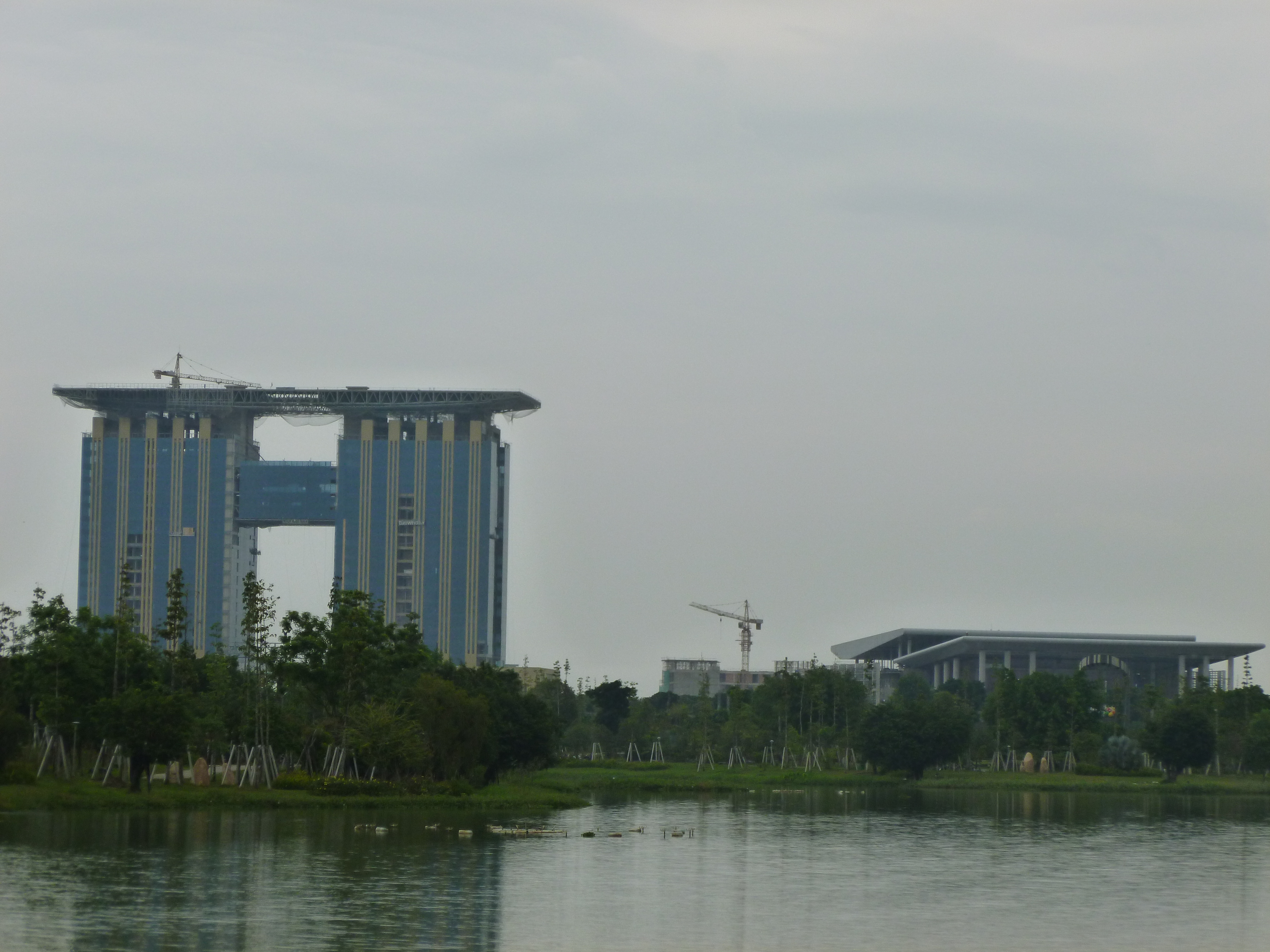
Bình Dương Administrative Centre with the WTC Expo Bình Dương

To date, Becamex has constructed and put into operation the province's centralized political-administrative center, which was architected by CPG Corporation and proposed to transform into Science and Technology Center (Trung tâm Khoa học và Công nghệ) under Ho Chi Minh City with The WTC Office Tower, and the Bình Dương Convention and Exhibition Center (or WTC Expo) was completed. The WTC Gateway complex at the A1 roundabout is under construction, will have a central station here with a MRT line to connect with the Suoi Tien Terminal station. All of them formed the World Trade Center Binh Duong New City, an official member of World Trade Centers Association. The total investment capital for projects within the Bình Dương New City center from the start of construction through 2020 is projected to exceed VND 150 trillion, with over VND 20 trillion allocated to key driving projects.

The Tokyu Garden City, a project developed by Becamex Tokyu, a joint venture between Becamex IDC and Tokyu Corporation in Bình Dương New City. To date, the project have been completed within the urban area are the Sora Gardens Apartments with the Sora Gardens Shopping Center (SC) located at the base, featuring the Aeon Supermarket New City on Hùng Vương Boulevard. The Hikari Complex, an area for Commercial Tenants, Event Sponsorships & PR Booths consisting of about 15 sections of restaurants and cafes, and consists of one or two floors of buildings, located behind the Bình Dương Administrative Centre and nearby the WTC Gateway complex at the A1 roundabout.

The Eastern International University (Trường Đại học Quốc tế Miền Đông) is planned on 26 hectares. With a total investment of 1,700 billion VND, it is located on a lot surrounded by streets of Nam Kỳ Khởi Nghĩa, Lê Duẩn and Hữu Nghị.

=== Industrial facilities ===
This area is home to seven industrial parks and two golf courses:

- Industrial parks: Đại Đăng, Sóng Thần 3, Kim Huy, VSIP 2, Đồng An 2, Phú Tân and Mapletree Việt Nam High-tech Park
- Phú Chánh Industrial Clusters
- Golf courses: Harmonie Course, Phú Mỹ Course (Twin Doves Golf Clubs).
