= Becamex Group =

Vietnamese state-owned conglomerate

Becamex Investment And Industrial Development Group
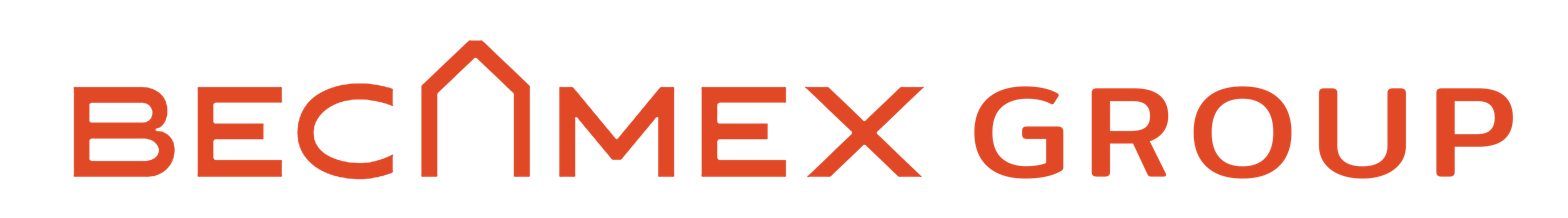
- Trade name: Becamex Group
- Native name: Tập đoàn Đầu tư và Phát triển Công nghiệp Becamex – CTCP
- Type: State-owned enterprise
- Traded as: HOSE: BCM
- Industry: security, finance, insurance, bank, construction, trade, real estate, service, telecommunication, information technology, concrete production, material construction, mineral, medication, health care and education
- Founded: 1976
- Founder: People's Committee of Sông Bé Province
- Headquarters: 9th Floor, WTC Tower, No.1 Hùng Vương Boulevard, Bình Dương, Ho Chi Minh City, Vietnam
- Key people: – Nguyễn Văn Hùng (chairman): Nguyễn Phú Thịnh (deputy chairman); Phạm Ngọc Thuận (chief officer); Nguyễn Văn Hoàng (deputy chief officer); Nguyễn Hoàn Vũ (deputy chief officer); Nguyễn Văn Thanh Huy (deputy chief officer); Giang Quốc Dũng (deputy chief officer); Quảng Văn Viết Cương (deputy chief officer); Nguyễn Việt Long (deputy chief officer); Nguyễn Thị Thanh Nhàn (lead accountant)
- Revenue: ▲VND 6,512 billion VND (2015)
- Operating income: ▲VND 702 billion VND (2015)
- Total assets: ▲VND 113,000 billion VND (2011)
- Owner: People's Committee of Bình Dương Province
- Number of employees: 3,922
- Subsidiaries: 28
- Website: becamex.com.vn

Becamex Investment and Industrial Development Group (doing business as Becamex Group or simply Becamex; Vietnamese: Tập đoàn Đầu tư và Phát triển Công nghiệp Becamex) is a multidisciplinary corporation whose headquarters is located in the former Bình Dương Province, now a part of Ho Chi Minh City. The corporation also bears the mark of Binh Duong, a key industrial area of the country, and is also known as the owner and operator behind Becamex Binh Duong / Ho Chi Minh City FC.

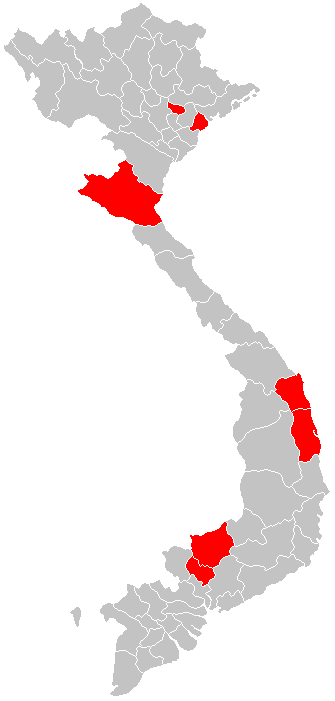
Provinces in Vietnam that Becamex invested in

== History ==
Becamex IDC was founded in 1976 under the original identity of Ben Cat General Trading Company (Becamex; Công ty Thương nghiệp Tổng hợp Bến Cát) featuring trading market, agricultural good production, and good distribution. The acronym "Becamex" remains the company's trading name ever since.

In 1992, with the approval of People's Committee of Sông Bé Province, Becamex was incorporated into a Province-rank company (under the management of Sông Bé Province People's Committee), and its official name was changed to Sông Bé Province Trade, Import and Export Company.

After Bình Dương Province was split from Sông Bé Province in 1997, to follow the new economic trend and show off their ambition, in 1999 the company changed its name to Trade – Investment and Development Company (BECAMEX Corp).

On 28 April 2006, based on the decision coded 106/2006/QĐ-UBND of Bình Dương Province People's Committee, Industrial Investment and Development Company (Becamex IDC) was formed on Trade – Investment and Development Company with more advanced organization.

On 19 January 2010, Vietnam's Prime Minister Nguyễn Tấn Dũng signed public document number 151/TTg-ĐMDN, which Becamex IDC can operate as a parent-subsidiary company. The parent company is a single-member limited liability company.

As development, the corporation incorporated, invested and founded many daughter companies. Up until now, the corporation has 28 subsidiary members in every aspect.

== Industrial and Urban development projects ==
- Vietnam – Singapore Industrial Park (VSIP):

– VSIP I (Thuận An, Bình Dương): was formed on friendship and economic cooperation between Vietnam and Singapore by the first propose of Vietnam's 4th Prime Minister Võ Văn Kiệt to Goh Chok Tong Prime Minister in March 1994. The project was born on 31 January 1996 in Singapore. Then, on 14 May 1996, VSIP I was constructed with the witness of both prime ministers (Võ Văn Kiệt and Goh Chok Tong).

– VSIP II (Binh Duong New City, Thủ Dầu Một and Tân Uyên, Bình Dương): constructed in 2005 with 1,850 ha large.

– VSIP – Bắc Ninh (Từ Sơn, Bắc Ninh): constructed in 2007

– VSIP – Hải Phòng (Đình Vũ - Cát Hải Economic Zone, Haiphong): constructed in 2010

– VSIP – Quảng Ngãi (Sơn Tịnh, Quảng Ngãi): constructed in 2013

– VSIP – Bình Định (Nhơn Hội Economic Zone, Vân Canh, Bình Định): 2,308 ha large

- Mỹ Phước Industrial and Urban areas: 3,429 ha

– Mỹ Phước 1: 400 ha

– Mỹ Phước 2: 800 ha

– Mỹ Phước 3: 2,200 ha

– Mỹ Phước 4 – Thới Hòa Industrial and Urban area: 956 ha

– Mỹ Phước 5 – Bàu Bàng Industrial and Urban area: 2,000 ha

- Becamex City Center (Phú Lợi, Thủ Dầu Một, Bình Dương): 6,122 ha large
- Bình Dương Industrial – Service and Urban Complex (Binh Duong New City; Thủ Dầu Một, Bình Dương): 4,196 ha large
- Becamex – Bình Phước Industrial – Urban Complex (Chơn Thành, Bình Phước): 4,300 ha large (with industrial area is 2,448.27 ha)

== Achievements ==
- 3rd Class Labor Order (1997)
- 2nd Class Labor Order (1999)
- 1st Class Labor Order (2000)
- 3rd Class Independence Order (2009)
