= Lam Sơn =

Lam Sơn is a region on the Chu river in today's Thọ Xuân District of Thanh Hóa Province of Vietnam. It was the first location of the Lam Sơn uprising led by Lê Lợi against Ming rule. Several other Vietnamese geographical locations are named after this place, including:

- Lam Sơn, Haiphong, a ward of Lê Chân District
- Lam Sơn, Hưng Yên, a ward of Hưng Yên
- Lam Sơn, Thanh Hóa City, ward of Thanh Hóa city in Thanh Hóa Province
- Lam Sơn, Bỉm Sơn, a ward of Bỉm Sơn in Thanh Hóa Province
- Lam Sơn, Thọ Xuân, a township of Thọ Xuân District in Thanh Hóa Province
- Lam Sơn, Nghệ An, a commune of Đô Lương District
- Lam Sơn, Bắc Kạn, a commune of Na Rì District
- Lam Sơn, Ngọc Lặc, a commune of Ngọc Lặc District in Thanh Hóa Province
- Lam Sơn, Hải Dương, a commune of Thanh Miện District

== See also ==
- Lam Son High School, a public school in Thanh Hóa city and is the first high school in Thanh Hóa Province
- Lam Sơn Square, an urban square in downtown Ho Chi Minh City
- Lâm Sơn (disambiguation)
- Operation Lam Son II
- Operation Lam Son 719
