= Tân Khánh =

Tân Khánh may refer to the following places in Vietnam:

- Tân Khánh, Ho Chi Minh City
- Tân Khánh, Phú Bình district, Thái Nguyên province
- Tân Khánh, Lai Vung, Đồng Tháp province

== Other uses ==
- Tân Khánh Trung, is a commune in Đồng Tháp province, Vietnam
- Tân Khánh Đông village, Sa Đéc (city), Đồng Tháp province
- Tân Khánh Hòa, Giang Thành district, Kiên Giang province
- Võ Lâm Tân Khánh Bà Trà, a Vietnamese martial art
