= Phú Bình (disambiguation) =

Phú Bình may refer to several places in Vietnam, including:

- Phú Bình, a commune of Thái Nguyên province
- Phú Bình district, a former rural district of Thái Nguyên province
- Phú Bình, Huế, a former ward of Huế
- Phú Bình, Long Khánh, a former ward of Long Khánh in Đồng Nai province
- Phú Bình, An Giang, a former commune of Phú Tân district, An Giang
- Phú Bình, Tân Phú, a former commune of Tân Phú district, Đồng Nai
- Phú Bình, Tuyên Quang, a former commune of Chiêm Hóa district
