= 富平 =

富平 may refer to:

- Bupyeong (부평), Incheon, South Korea
- Fuping County, Shaanxi, China
- Phú Bình, several places in Vietnam

== See also ==
- The dictionary definition of 富 at Wiktionary
- The dictionary definition of 平 at Wiktionary
