= Thị Nại Bridge =

Bridge in Qui Nhon, Vietnam

Coordinates: 10°54′04″N 106°50′22″E

Nhơn Hội Bridge (Vietnamese: Cầu Nhơn Hội) is a bridge in Vietnam, connecting the city of Qui Nhơn to the Phương Mai Peninsula. The bridge was inaugurated in 2006 and was the longest sea bridge in Vietnam with a length of 2477.3 metres, and width of 14.5 metres. The bridge took three years to construct and opened on December 22, 2006. It cut the road distance from Qui Nhơn City to Nhon Hoi Economic Zone from 60 km (via Tuy Phước District) to only 7 km.
