= Hòa Lợi (disambiguation) =

Hòa Lợi is a ward of Ho Chi Minh City, Vietnam. However, Hòa Lợi may also refer to the following defunct placenames in Vietnam:

- Hòa Lợi, Bến Tre: a rural commune of Thạnh Phú district, now part of Quới Điền commune
- Hòa Lợi, Kiên Giang: a rural commune of Giồng Riềng district, now part of Hòa Hưng commune
- Hòa Lợi, Trà Vinh: a rural commune of Châu Thành district, now part of Hưng Mỹ commune
