= Operation Lam Son II =

Part of the Vietnam War (1966)

- Part of the Vietnam War
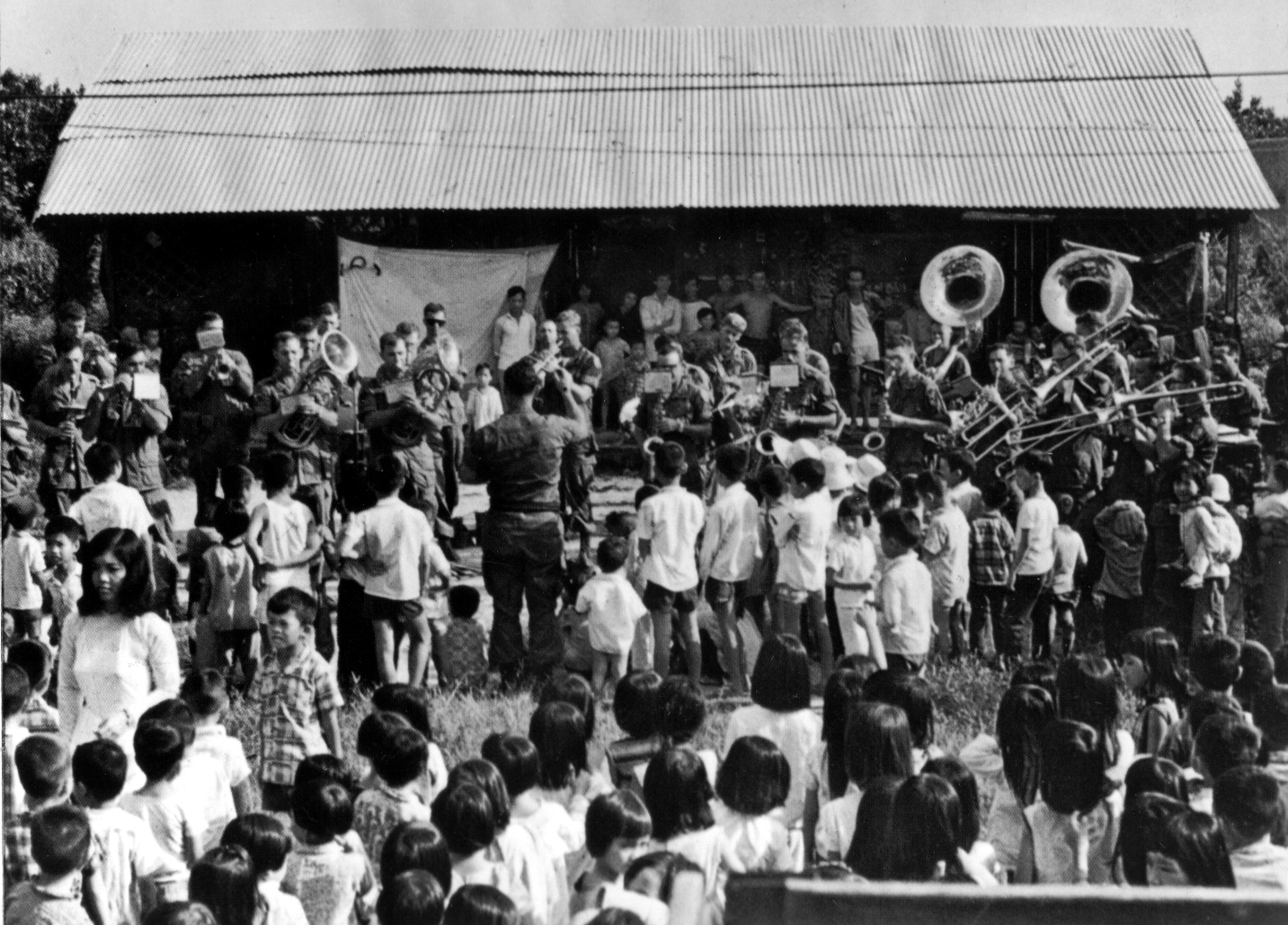
- American military band performing in Tân Phước Khánh during the fair
Date	June 2–5, 1966
Location	Tân Phước Khánh, Tân Uyên District, Bình Dương, South Vietnam
Result	Anti-communist political victory

Belligerents
South Vietnam; United States	Viet Cong

Commanders and leaders
Lý Tòng Bá; Henry J. Wereszynski	Not applicable

Strength
Five companies	Around 30

Casualties and losses
None	One killed

Operation Lam Son II (Vietnamese: chiến dịch Lam Sơn II) was a combined United States and South Vietnamese military and public relations operation in the village of Tân Phước Khánh, Tân Uyên District, in III Corps around 40 km north of the capital Saigon staged from June 2 to June 5, 1966, during the Vietnam War. It was done in order to simultaneously win public support (hearts and minds) for the government of South Vietnam by holding a village fair and providing social services while simultaneously screening the congregated area to arrest and remove Viet Cong guerrillas operating in the area.

On the night of June 1, the eve of the village fair, elements of the US 1st Division and the South Vietnamese 5th Division arrived on the outskirts of the village by foot and helicopter and sealed it off. Early the next morning they entered the village and screened the inhabitants, before taking adult males away for brief questioning, detaining communists and South Vietnamese military deserters or conscription evaders and returning the rest to the village. At the fair, the village of 9,000 were entertained by South Vietnamese and American military bands, while the South Vietnamese military cultural troupe performed plays, folk singing and dancing. Games for children, lotteries and a free lunch of unfamiliar western food were provided to the villagers.

In addition to the festivities, Vietnamese leaders, from civil servants to the province chief, Lieutenant Colonel Lý Tòng Bá, attended the fairs and made speeches and spoke to the villagers individually about government policies and initiatives such as agricultural assistance. Personnel from US and South Vietnamese medical units did health checks on villagers, providing medicine and organizing appointments for further treatment in the city where required. The festival was considered highly successful by the anti-communist organizers to they added a third day of activities to the schedule after the festival had started.

The Americans and South Vietnamese deemed the mission to have been very fruitful due to the change in the disposition of the villagers as well as the fact that during an immediately after the fair, some of the populace gave intelligence that resulted in some communists being arrested, while other Viet Cong defected and revealed the location of weapons and documents. Later, Viet Cong sources revealed that they had lost half of their support in the village and that their political losses would take two months to recover. Operation Lam Son II was then replicated in various villages in the area.

== Background and planning ==
Operation Lam Son II was the second such operation in Bình Dương Province north of Saigon. A week earlier, another hamlet search and festival was held on 26 May 1966 in Binh Chuan and was deemed to be very successful. The village in question, Tân Phước Khánh was located about 40 km north of the capital Saigon and 10 km east of the town of Thủ Dầu Một, and it was located in the Iron Triangle a communist stronghold. The mission was to pacify the village, conduct a thorough search, uncover and root out the Viet Cong infrastructure, gather intelligence, and "win the hearts and minds of the people." Planning and execution involved close teamwork between U.S. and Vietnamese forces. A combined staff of both Vietnamese and U.S. personnel from the two division headquarters was formed to plan and command the operation together. Because of the wide publicity, the cordon and seal of Tan Phuoc Khanh had to be completed as quickly as possible to minimize the loss of surprise to communist suspects. The helicopter would be pivotal in providing the necessary speed. The operation was conducted by the US 1st Infantry Division and the South Vietnamese 5th Division.

== Cordoning off the village ==
The seal and search of the village had started on June 1. While the rest of the division was preparing night patrols, selecting outpost locations, and digging in to overnight defensive positions, Major Henry J. Wereszynski's 1st Battalion, 26th Infantry, was conducting an airmobile assault to set up a cordon around the village of Tân Phước Khánh and its 9,000 inhabitants. A combined force of five companies had been formed to cordon the village. Major Wereszynski had Companies A, B, and C with Troop A, 1st Squadron, 4th Cavalry, attached and the 7th Company, 7th ARVN Regiment of the 5th Division.

As the airmobile force was flying toward its landing zones, Wereszynski sat in the command and control helicopter, reviewing the plan. Company A would assault into a zone north of the village, Company B would be on the east, and Company C would land in the south. Troop A, 1st Squadron, 4th Cavalry, and 7th Company, 7th ARVN Regiment, were already moving overland to seal off the western side of the village. As the air assault ended, the ground elements were moving into position. The village was sealed at 2010. Later that night Company A was moved by air mobile assault farther north to cut off communist suspects from escaping the village. A sketch of the U.S. Phu Loi Base Camp was found on the body of a suspected communist killed during the assault to establish the cordon.

== Screening of villagers ==
At 0605 the next day, 2d Company, 7th ARVN Regiment, moved into the village. Loudspeakers were used to reassure the villagers, advising them what to do, and providing a means of control. While the external cordon remained in place, 2d Company soldiers established additional cordon lines to further divide the village into three sections. Search forces from Bình Dương Province were brought in to screen the village. The force had been adapted to fit the needs of this operation and contained many different types of units.

Firstly all men between the ages of 15 and 45 were taken to the National Police headquarters in nearby Phu Cuong for additional screening before returning if their papers were in order. The festival, which was designed to display the concern of the Vietnamese government for the welfare of the people, began. The proceedings were launched by the Bình Dương Provinceband at 0830. By 0900 hamlet residents began arriving in the central area and were greeted by personnel from province headquarters. Of the villagers, 740 men were sent for screening. Of these, 29 were found to be Viet Cong suspects, 9 were ARVN deserters, 4 possessed false identification cards, 13 were former Viet Cong who had violated their probation conditions, and 62 were evading conscription. The search of the village had uncovered 25 more communist suspects, including 3 women carrying medical supplies and 10 men hiding in haystacks and wooded areas. The anti-communist sniffer dogs had discovered two tunnels in the village. During the day 325 people were interrogated at the identification stations. Two of these were identified as Viet Cong, one allegedly the communists' village secretary.

== Fair ==
Information about government policies was printed on leaflets handed to villagers, which were stamped with lottery numbers. These leaflets helped control the people and to maintain their interest in the program in case they won the lottery. The winners received household items as prizes. As the people gathered in the entertainment area, the 5th ARVN Division band performed the Vietnamese national anthem, Tiếng Gọi Công Dân (Call to the citizens) as the red-striped, yellow-background Vietnamese banners and flags flew. According to the US military, "this action conveyed to the people the presence of a government—one that cared." The national anthem was followed by a performance of Vietnamese folk dance, folk plays and songs by the 5th ARVN Division cultural teams. The province chief, Lieutenant Colonel Lý Tòng Bá, and the district chief, an ARVN captain, gave speeches explaining government policy and urging the villagers to support the government cause. Bá stayed all day to talk to elders and family heads. The hamlet festival was a collection of several functions; while it was merely entertainment in the eyes of the children, there were more serious objectives for the adults.

A Medical Civic Action Program (MEDCAP) station manned by medical personnel from an American unit, aided by Vietnamese interpreters, and a dentist was brought along to provide health check-ups and treatment for the villages. The medical treatment was mainly symptomatic and for minor problems, such as aspirin for pains, soap and medication for skin diseases, and extraction for toothaches. Where more serious medical issues were diagnosed, they were referred to other facilities outside the military channels for proper treatment or corrective surgery. The Youth Service Activity entertained the children so that their parents were free to talk to the government officials present about more serious matters such as government policy. Games were played, songs were sung, candy and toys were handed out to the children, and movies were shown. At one point Colonel Ba joined the children for ballgames. The Vietnamese Agricultural Service provided information to the elders about farming and government initiatives designed to assist farmers. The American military personnel present reported that the villagers appeared to be very pleased with the information session and the free social services.

At noon, the Americans provided a lunch of hot dogs, potato salad, milk, juice, and other side dishes and drinks. The Americans reported that the people were curious and commented about the unfamiliar taste of the food, which was rather different from their rice-dominant diet, but that many returned for second and third helpings. The first day of festivities ended at around 1530 after the 1st Infantry Division Band had finished marching through the streets playing tunes. According to an American military report "It was not just a concert but a weapon in 'the other war.'"

The Vietnamese psychological operations and civil affairs teams performed several duties. They helped direct and control the people at first and mingled with the crowd, talking to small groups of villagers. They were able to discuss government opportunities and learn what the citizens needed and wanted from Saigon. In the words of the Americans, the"real purpose of the festival was to bring the government to the people and, at the same time, to turn an intelligence operation into an activity that the citizens would find pleasant." A major objective was to dismantle the Viet Cong infrastructure, so all civilians were therefore required to pass an interview and check of their identification cards by Vietnamese officials, and to obtain a free pass for the event. This process allowed the detection of false identification papers and the selection of persons for further screening. Other stations were established for villagers who wanted to volunteer information about the communists. Rice was given to all persons during the interviews.

== Political consolidation ==
The cordon force remained in position throughout the night, and on 3 June the festival continued. Selected areas were again searched. The western portion of the village yielded forty-eight more Viet Cong suspects. They were hiding in haystacks, tunnels, woodpiles, and watchtowers. By the end of the second day, the festival had succeeded in softening and changing the attitudes of many individuals who had been hostile to the government. The operation was deemed such a success that it was extended for a third day. By the end of the festivities, the anti-communists felt that they had achieved much political success and that the civilian population wanted to assist in reporting communists so that they could be expelled from their village. One woman was given 200 piasters for volunteering information leading to the apprehension of a Viet Cong suspect hiding in a coffin, while one Viet Cong defected and led an intelligence platoon to a weapons cache that also contained communist tax collection statistics. He said that he had decided to rally to the government of Vietnam as a result of the hamlet festival. Many individuals spoke out about Viet Cong harassment and intimidation and stated that if they had sufficient security many more people would come there to live under government rule.

At 0400 on June 5, 1966, the operations at Tân Phước Khánh finished and the personnel moved north to Hoa Nhut to do the same thing, something that was repeated in the region as it was thought to be highly effective in dismantling communist support networks. Information acquired by anti-communist forces at a later date indicated that the Viet Cong had reviewed the Tan Phuoc Khanh operation and had estimated that they had lost 50% of their effectiveness and that they estimated that two months would be needed to recoup their losses.

An American military report said that "In a country like Vietnam...where the power and aims of the legitimate government are questioned and tested each day, any action or incident that shows the individual citizen that his government is interested and concerned in his welfare is highly effective. The hamlet festival served this purpose well." One American official who thought the operation a success said "The primary accomplishment was the demonstration of an effective technique to bring government, including necessary force to initiate law and order, to a contested hamlet. Without the cordon and search the operation would have been merely a festival. Without the festival the operation would have been another 'police action.' Together, the effort [was] a useful means to begin a pacification drive."
