= Vĩnh Tân =

Vĩnh Tân Phường Vĩnh Tân Tân Bình
- Ward
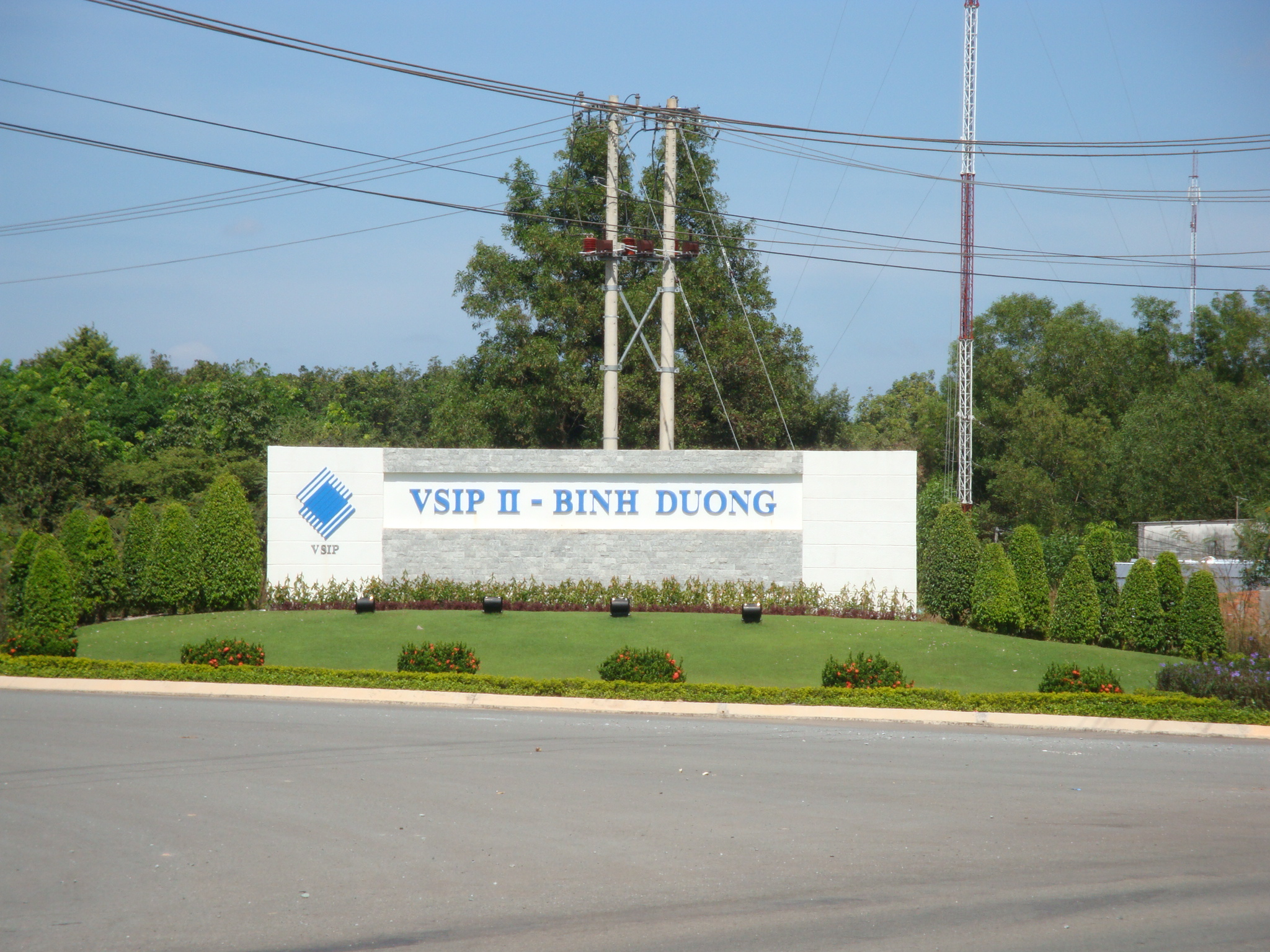
- Interactive map of Vĩnh Tân
- Coordinates: 11°06′56″N 106°42′43″E
- Country: Vietnam
- Municipality: Ho Chi Minh City
- Established: June 16, 2025

Area
  - Total: 23.69 sq mi (61.35 km^{2})

Population (2024)
  - Total: 61,865
  - Density: 2,612/sq mi (1,008/km^{2})
- Time zone: UTC+07:00 (Indochina Time)
- Administrative code: 25912

Vĩnh Tân (Vietnamese: Phường Vĩnh Tân) is a ward of Ho Chi Minh City, Vietnam. It is one of the 168 new wards, communes and special zones of the city following the reorganization in 2025.

== History ==
On June 16, 2025, the National Assembly Standing Committee issued Resolution No. 1685/NQ-UBTVQH15 on the arrangement of commune-level administrative units of Ho Chi Minh City in 2025 (effective from June 16, 2025). Accordingly, the entire land area and population of Vĩnh Tân ward of the former Tân Uyên city and Tân Bình township of the former Bắc Tân Uyên district will be integrated into a new ward named Vĩnh Tân (Clause 97, Article 1).
