= Phú Bình =

- Commune
- Hương Sơn area in 2022
- Interactive map of Phú Bình
- Coordinates: 21.460060°N 105.978456°E
- Country: Vietnam
- Region: Northeast
- Province: Thái Nguyên
- Established: 2025

Area
  - Total: 44.18 km^{2} (17.06 sq mi)

Population (2025)
  - Total: 44,845
  - Density: 1,015/km^{2} (2,630/sq mi)
- Website: phubinh.thainguyen.gov.vn

Phú Bình is a commune in the southeastern part of Thái Nguyên province, Vietnam.

== History ==
In 1989, part of the area and population of Hương Sơn Commune was separated to establish Úc Sơn township, the district capital of Phú Bình district.

In 2003, the Government issued a decree establishing Hương Sơn township through the merger of the entire area and population of Úc Sơn township and Hương Sơn Commune.

In June 2025, Phú Bình Commune was established through the merger of the entire area and population of Xuân Phương, Úc Kỳ, Nhã Lộng, and Bảo Lý communes, Hương Sơn township, and part of Thượng Đình Commune of Phú Bình district.
