= Tân Hiệp, Ho Chi Minh City =

Tân Hiệp Phường Tân Hiệp Khánh Bình
- Ward
- Kim Hằng Roundabout
- Interactive map of Tân Hiệp
- Coordinates: 11°02′42″N 106°43′59″E
- Country: Vietnam
- Municipality: Ho Chi Minh City
- Established: June 16, 2025

Government
  - Type: Ward-level authority

Area
  - Total: 18.17 sq mi (47.06 km^{2})

Population (2024)
  - Total: 142,494
  - Density: 7,842/sq mi (3,028/km^{2})
- Time zone: UTC+07:00 (Indochina Time)
- Administrative code: 25920

Tân Hiệp (Vietnamese: Phường Tân Hiệp) is a ward of Ho Chi Minh City, Vietnam. It is one of the 168 new wards, communes and special zones of the city following the reorganization in 2025.

== History ==
On June 16, 2025, the National Assembly Standing Committee issued Resolution No. 1685/NQ-UBTVQH15 on the arrangement of commune-level administrative units of Ho Chi Minh City in 2025 (effective from June 16, 2025). Accordingly, the entire land area and population of Khánh Bình and Tân Hiệp wards of the former Tân Uyên city will be integrated into a new ward named Tân Hiệp (Clause 100, Article 1).
