= Lâm Sơn (disambiguation) =

Lâm Sơn is a rural commune of Khánh Hòa province.

Lâm Sơn may also refer to:

- Lâm Sơn, Hòa Bình, a former rural commune of Lương Sơn District
- Lâm Sơn, Lạng Sơn, a former rural commune of Chi Lăng District
