= Nga My =

- Commune
- Interactive map of Nga My
- Coordinates: 19.276552865569766°N 104.78596986194249°E
- Country: Vietnam
- Region: North Central Coast
- Province: Nghệ An
- Established: 16 June 2025

Area
  - Total: 302.52 km^{2} (116.80 sq mi)

Population (2025)
  - Total: 8,467
  - Density: 27/km^{2} (70/sq mi)

Nga My is a commune in Nghệ An province, Vietnam. The commune was formed through the merger of Xiêng My and Nga My communes of the former Tương Dương district as part of the 2025 Vietnamese administrative reform.

Nga My commune was established under Resolution No. 1678/NQ-UBTVQH15, issued by the Standing Committee of the National Assembly of Vietnam on 16 June 2025. Under the resolution, the entire area and population of Xiêng My and Nga My communes, formerly part of Tương Dương district, were merged to form a new commune named Nga My.
