= Quy Nhơn =

Ward and capital of Gia Lai province, Vietnam

- Ward
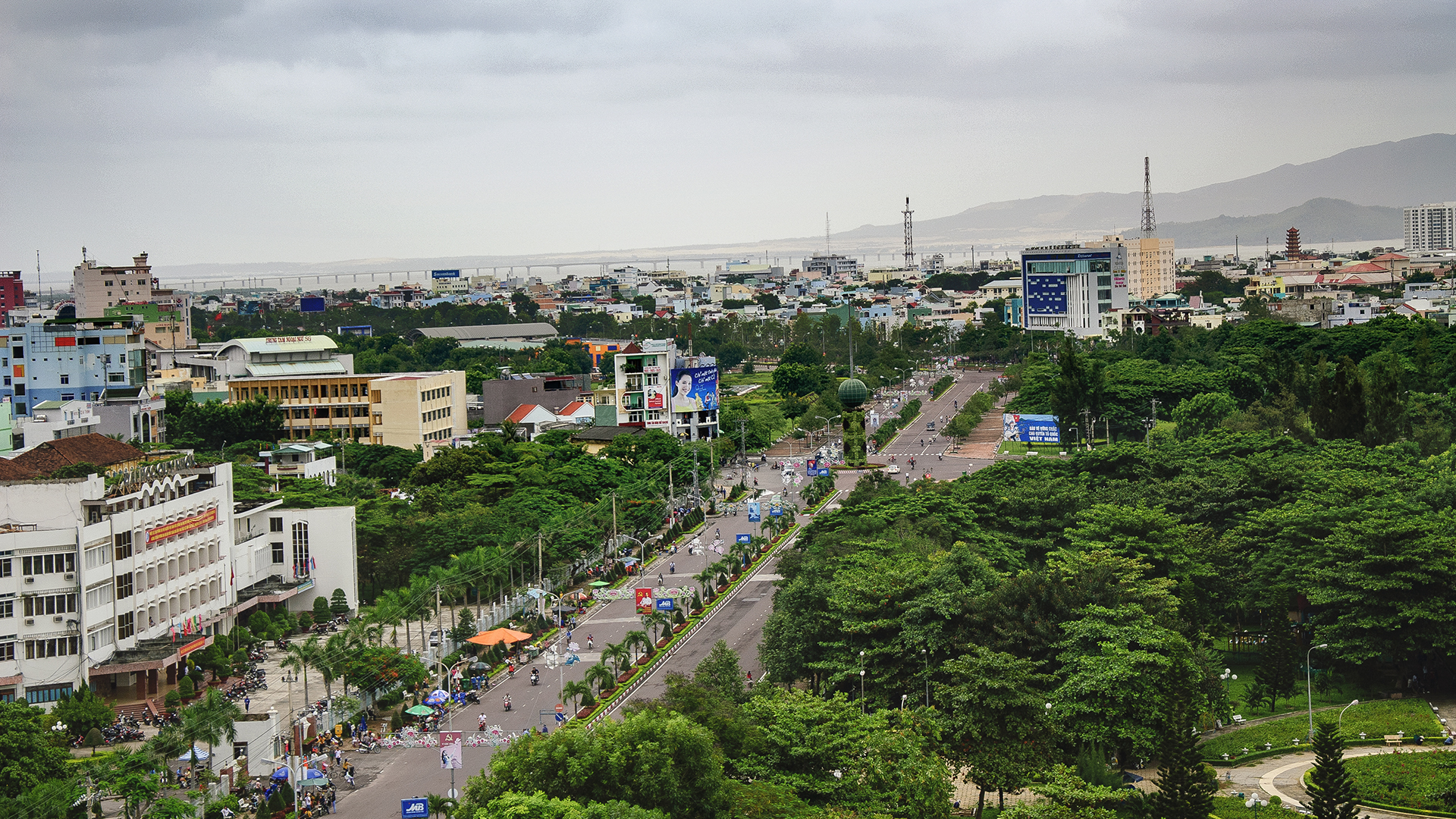
- Quy Nhon

- Seal
- Interactive map of Quy Nhơn
- Location of in Vietnam
- Coordinates: 13°46′N 109°14′E
- Country: Vietnam
- Region: South Central Coast and Central Highlands
- Province: Gia Lai
- Established: June 16, 2025

Government
  - Type: Ward

Area
  - Total: 21.78 km^{2} (8.41 sq mi)

Population (2025)
  - Total: 129,326 people
  - Density: 5,938/km^{2} (15,380/sq mi)
- Time zone: UTC+07:00 (Indochina Time)
- Climate: As
- Website: www.quynhon.gov.vn

Quy Nhơn or Quy Nhon (Vietnamese: Quy Nhơn [kʷī ɲə̄ːŋ]); is a ward in Gia Lai province, Vietnam. It was the capital of Gia Lai province. Quy Nhơn ward has an area of 21.78 km^{2} and population in 2025 is 129,326 people. Historically, the commercial activities of Quy Nhơn focused on agriculture and fishing. However, there had been a significant shift towards service industries and tourism. There was also a substantial manufacturing sector.

== History ==
The origins of human settlement stretch back to the 11th-century Champa culture, the Tây Sơn dynasty as well as the 18th-century seaport of Thị Nại. The city was subject to a Mongol invasion in the Battle of Thị Nại Bay (1283) during the Mongol invasions of Vietnam. During the Ming treasure voyages of the 15th century, the Chinese fleet led by Admiral Zheng He would always make port at Quy Nhơn in Champa as their first destination after leaving China. During the 1620s the town was host to Portuguese Jesuits who called the place Pulo Cambi.

The town of Quy Nhon was officially founded in the late 19th century by Emperor Thành Thái. It was also the site of the Bombardment of Qui Nhơn in 1861, and more recently, it had a large American and Korean military presence, especially the Capital Mechanized Infantry Division of the Republic of Korea Army during the Vietnam War.

Today the ward with a geo-economic priority and an urbanized infrastructure. The government describes it as one of the three commercial and tourism centres of the central southern coastal region (with Da Nang and Nha Trang).

== Geography ==
Quy Nhơn is a coastal ward located in the eastern part of Gia Lai province. Located 170 km southeast of Pleiku ward. It borders with Quy Nhơn Đông ward to the north and east; Quy Nhơn Bắc to the west, Quy Nhơn Nam to the southwest and South China Sea to the south.

Quy Nhơn has a varied topography, being extremely diversified with mountains and forests, hills, fields, salt marshes, plains, lagoons, lakes, rivers, shorelines, peninsulas and islands. Its coastline is 42 kilometres or 26 miles long with sandy beaches, abundant seafood resources and other natural products of economic value. Hà Thanh River flows through ward.

== Climate ==
Quy Nhơn has a tropical monsoon climate (Am), very close to being classified as a tropical savanna climate (Köppen As), with year round very warm to hot temperatures and distinct wet and dry seasons. Quy Nhơn is occasionally hit by the tail-end of typhoons hitting further up the coast.

Climate data for Quy Nhon
Month	Jan	Feb	Mar	Apr	May	Jun	Jul	Aug	Sep	Oct	Nov	Dec	Year
Record high °C (°F)	34.6 (94.3)	37.9 (100.2)	39.8 (103.6)	42.1 (107.8)	41.7 (107.1)	41.4 (106.5)	42.1 (107.8)	40.9 (105.6)	39.0 (102.2)	37.3 (99.1)	34.6 (94.3)	33.0 (91.4)	42.1 (107.8)
Mean daily maximum °C (°F)	26.6 (79.9)	27.7 (81.9)	29.3 (84.7)	31.3 (88.3)	33.1 (91.6)	34.2 (93.6)	34.3 (93.7)	34.3 (93.7)	32.8 (91.0)	30.2 (86.4)	28.3 (82.9)	26.7 (80.1)	30.7 (87.3)
Daily mean °C (°F)	23.3 (73.9)	24.1 (75.4)	25.6 (78.1)	27.6 (81.7)	29.2 (84.6)	30.0 (86.0)	30.0 (86.0)	29.9 (85.8)	28.6 (83.5)	26.9 (80.4)	25.6 (78.1)	24.0 (75.2)	27.1 (80.8)
Mean daily minimum °C (°F)	21.2 (70.2)	21.7 (71.1)	23.1 (73.6)	25.0 (77.0)	26.4 (79.5)	27.1 (80.8)	27.0 (80.6)	27.0 (80.6)	25.8 (78.4)	24.6 (76.3)	23.6 (74.5)	22.1 (71.8)	24.6 (76.3)
Record low °C (°F)	15.2 (59.4)	15.7 (60.3)	15.8 (60.4)	19.4 (66.9)	19.1 (66.4)	21.7 (71.1)	20.6 (69.1)	20.7 (69.3)	20.5 (68.9)	17.9 (64.2)	15.0 (59.0)	15.5 (59.9)	15.0 (59.0)
Average rainfall mm (inches)	66.8 (2.63)	28.2 (1.11)	33.0 (1.30)	33.8 (1.33)	85.2 (3.35)	62.1 (2.44)	44.2 (1.74)	77.2 (3.04)	230.6 (9.08)	521.0 (20.51)	464.3 (18.28)	205.5 (8.09)	1,851.8 (72.91)
Average rainy days	13.6	6.6	5.4	4.7	8.6	7.8	7.2	9.5	15.7	21.4	21.9	19.1	141.4
Average relative humidity (%)	80.9	81.6	82.5	82.2	79.5	73.5	71.7	70.8	77.8	82.5	83.2	81.8	79.0
Mean monthly sunshine hours	154.8	187.4	237.7	261.4	273.2	248.2	249.4	235.7	199.3	163.1	123.2	111.4	2,444.6
Source 1: Vietnam Institute for Building Science and Technology
Source 2: The Yearbook of Indochina (1932–1933)

== Transportation ==
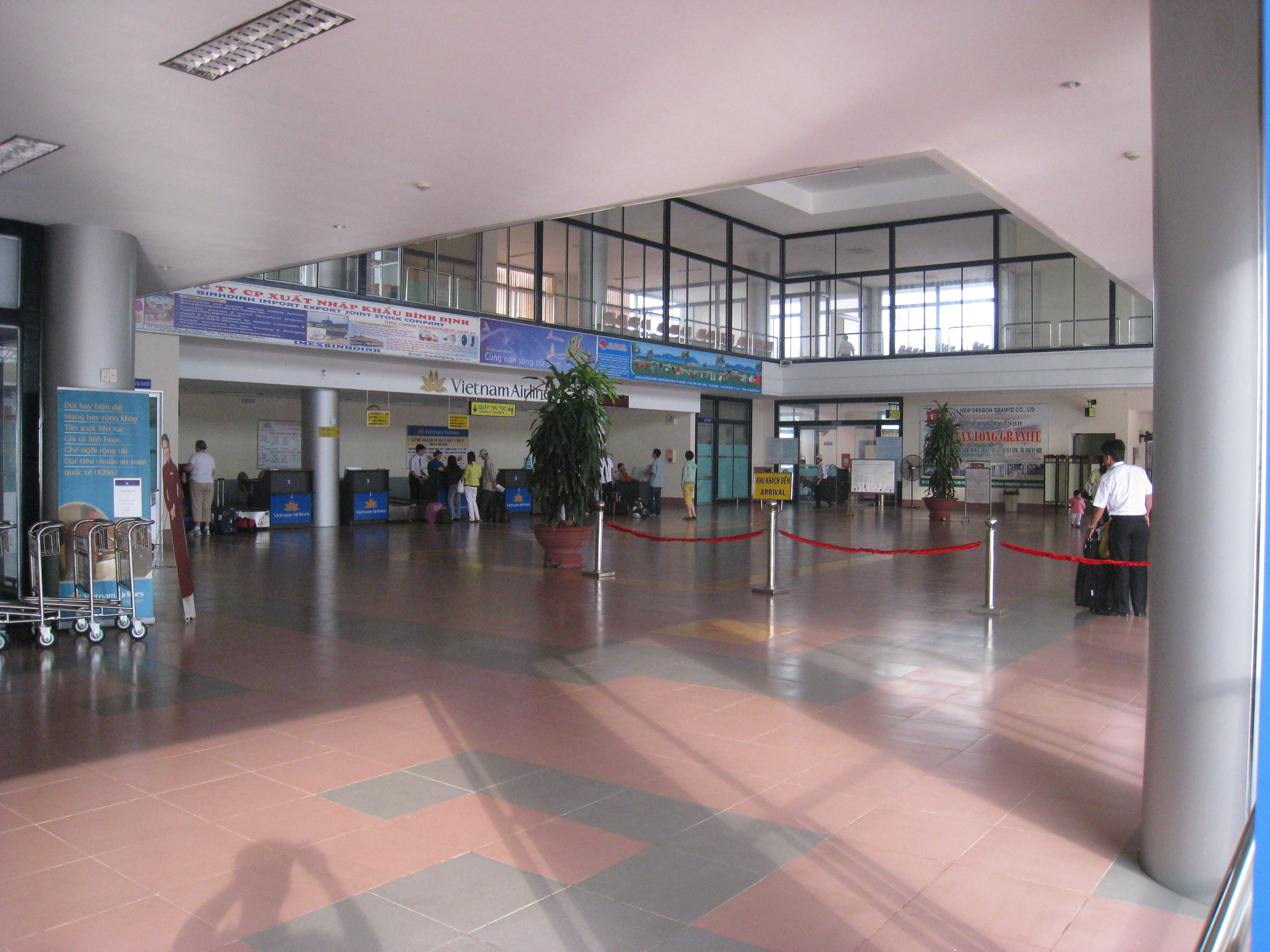
Phu Cat Airport

Quy Nhon is served by Vietnam Airlines, Bamboo Airways, VietJet Air and Pacific Airlines through Phu Cat Airport, with flights to Hanoi and Ho Chi Minh City.

Quy Nhơn railway station could be reached by a branch off the main line of the North–South railway, but this line was suspended in May 2016. Reunification express trains stop only in Diêu Trì railway station in Tuy Phước, near Quy Nhơn.

Quy Nhơn Port is located in the eastern tip of Quy Nhơn.

== Economy ==
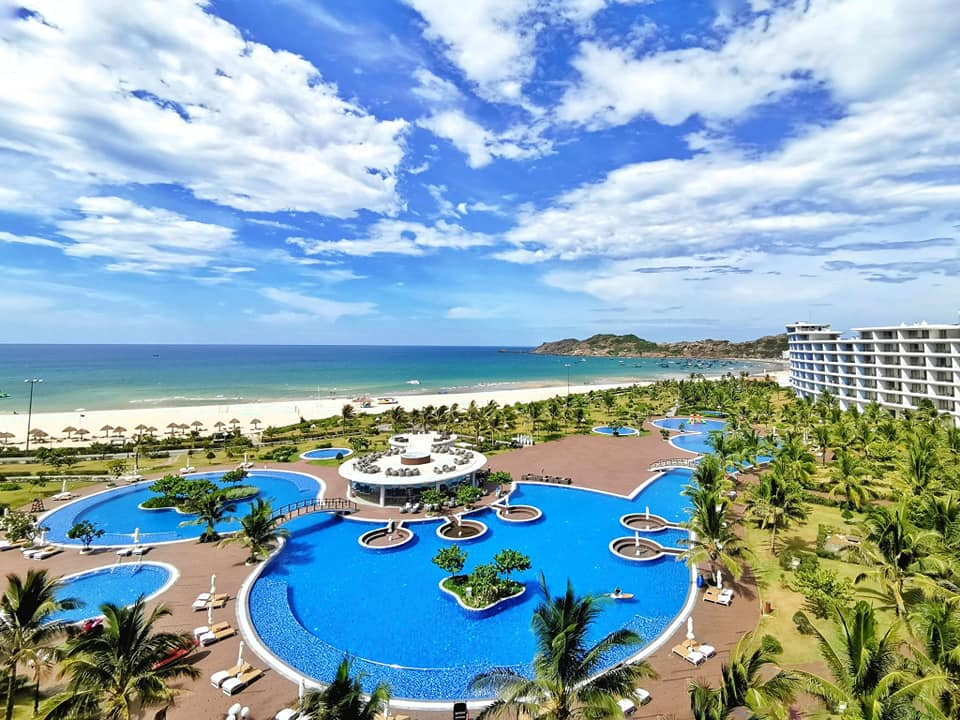
View from FLC Luxury Hotel Quy Nhơn

Quy Nhơn is one of the main industrial centres of the South Central Coast, behind only Da Nang and Nha Trang. It is also the major industrial and service centre of Gia Lai province, including its largest industrial facilities at Phu Tai Industrial Park and Nhơn Hội Economic Zone. The ward's economic activities include industries, export-imports, seaport services, aquatic product husbandry and tourism. The economic trend, at present, is increasingly service-based at the expense of agriculture, forestry and pisciculture.

Cereals are cultivated on 2548 ha of Quy Nhơn's land with an output of 13,021 tons as of 2009, just 2% of the province's total. Other crops included 10,891 tons of vegetables, 2,795 tons of sugar-cane, as well as smaller amounts of coconuts, peanuts and cashew nuts.

Much of the ward's industry is concentrated in and around Phú Tài Industrial Park in the west of the city along National Route 1A. Quy Nhơn is a major centre of garden furniture manufacturing. It has traditionally been relying on access to wood from Gia Lai's forests and Kon Tum and even as far as Cambodia's Ratanakiri and Laos' Attapeu province. Most of the furniture factories are located in Phú Tài Industrial Park. Several chemical enterprises that supply the furniture and wood processing industry have been set up in the vicinity of the industrial park.

Other industries in Quy Nhơn process agricultural and aquatic products, or produce construction materials and paper products. Bidiphar is a pharmaceutical company headquartered in Quy Nhon that is an exception to the ward's general focus on basic and wood processing industries. Nhơn Hội Economic Zone is central to the ward's and province's industrial development plans. However, as of late 2010 it was still in the early stages of development, with few factories completed.

Quy Nhơn has seen only limited foreign investment. As of 2008, thirteen foreign companies employed 1119 people in the city.

Currently the economic structure of Quy Nhơn is a shift towards increasing the proportion of service industries, reducing the rate of agriculture, forestry and fisheries in GDP. The shares of agriculture, forestry and fisheries – industrial and construction – services in GDP in 2006 reached 36.7%, 28% and 35.3%, respectively, while in 2005 it was at 38.4%, 26.7% and 34.9%, respectively.

The income per capita in 2018 was US$6,025 per person.

== Education ==
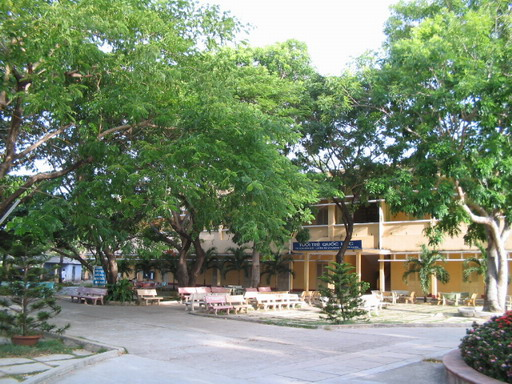
Quốc học Quy Nhơn high school

Quy Nhơn has two universities: Quy Nhơn University and Quang Trung University. As of 2009 they had a total teaching staff of 601 and 23,383 students, 13,704 of whom were female. There were 19,900 primary school students and 28,500 secondary school students.

== Cuisine ==
Quy Nhơn is home to multiple domestically famous Vietnamese dishes:

- Bánh xèo tôm nhảy (jumping-shrimps fried pancake): These pancakes are made with special formulas and each restaurant has its own way of making distinguished dipping fish sauce for this dish.
- Bánh hỏi cháo lòng: The dish composes of two sub-dishes: "Bánh hỏi" (a type of rice cake in Vietnam) and "cháo lòng" (pig's internal organs porridge).
- Bún chả cá (fish-cake rice vermicelli).
- Chả ram tôm đất (shrimp spring roll).

== Gallery ==
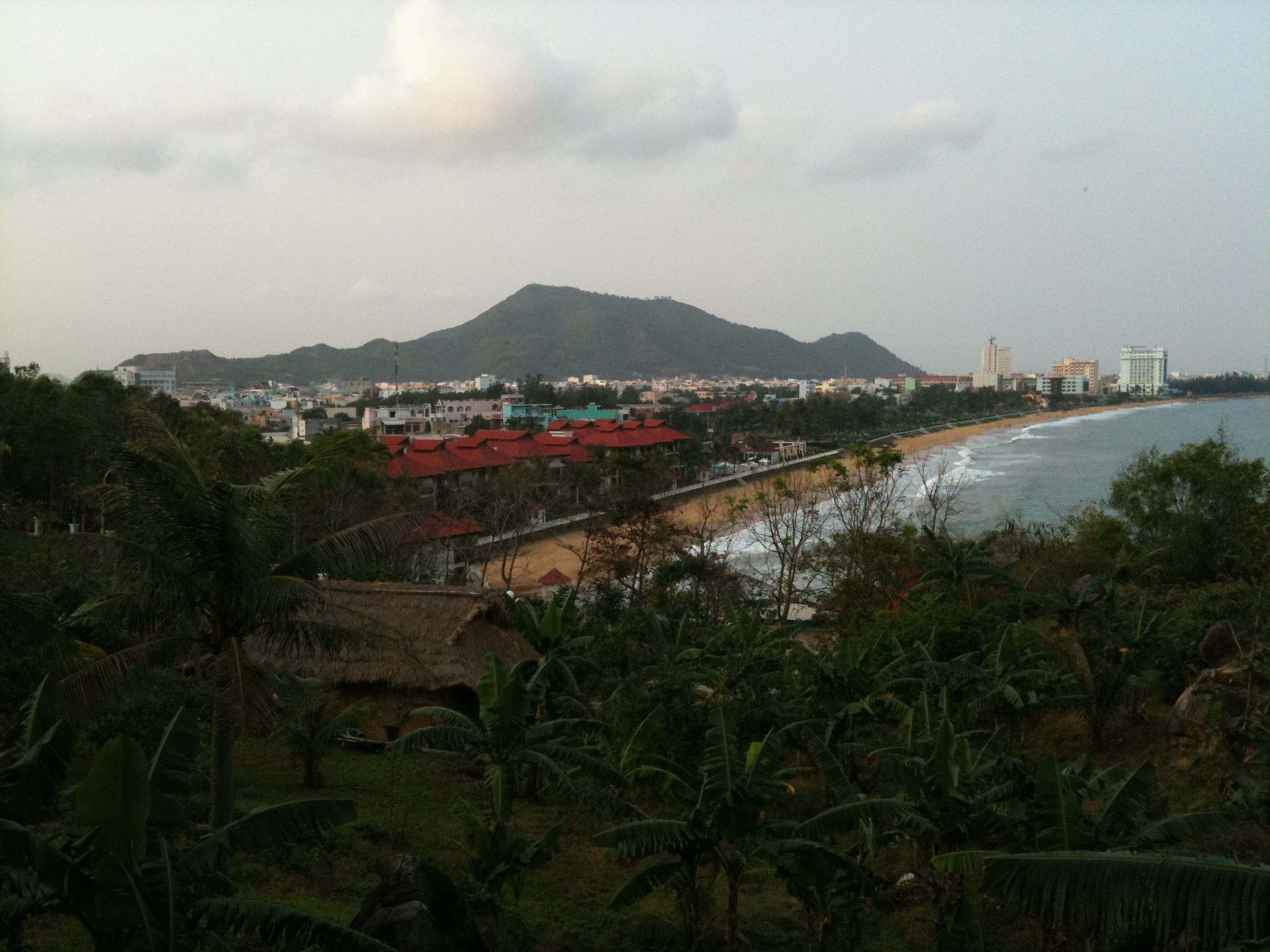
Quy Nhon landscape

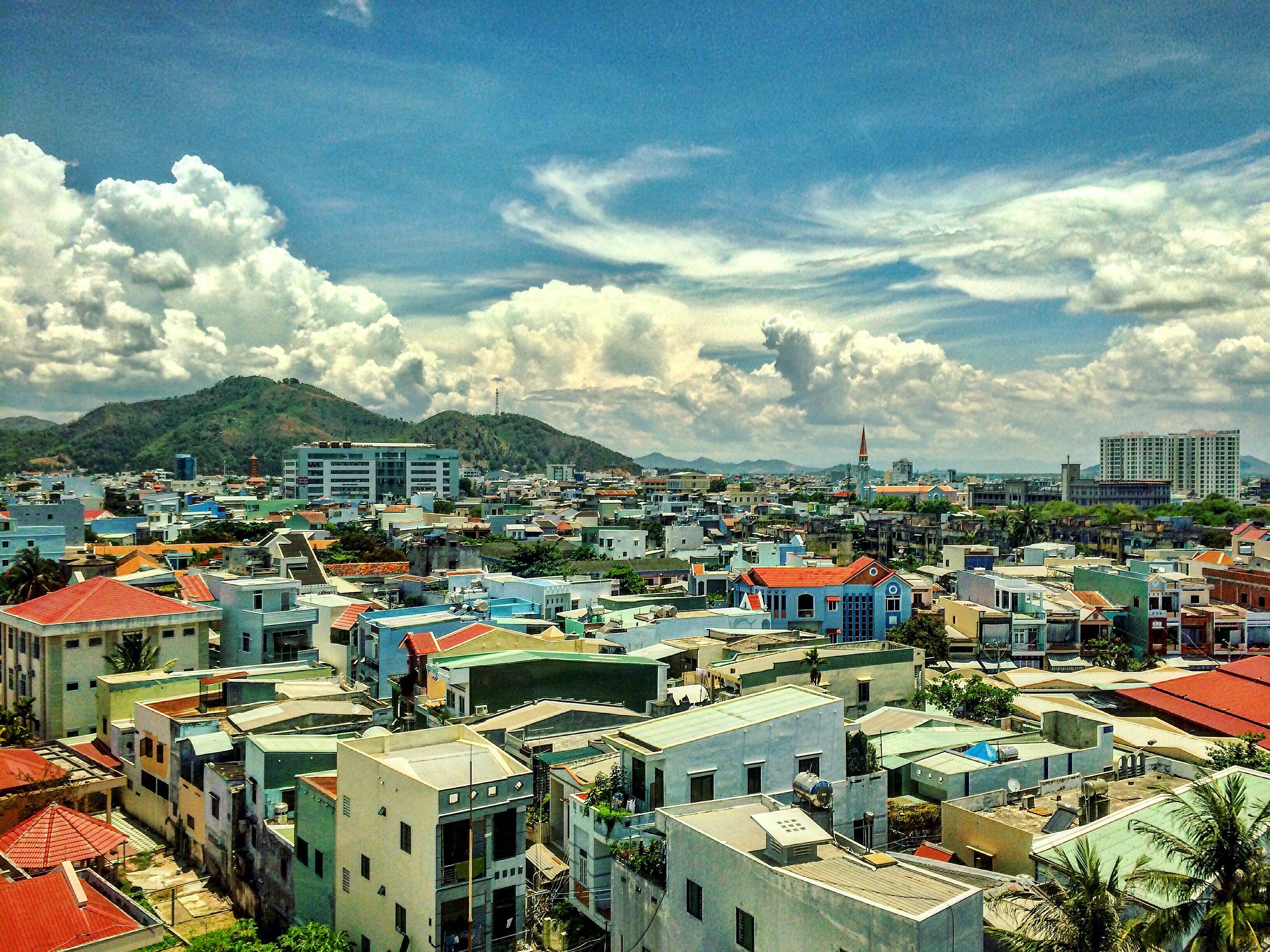
Quy Nhon city seen from above

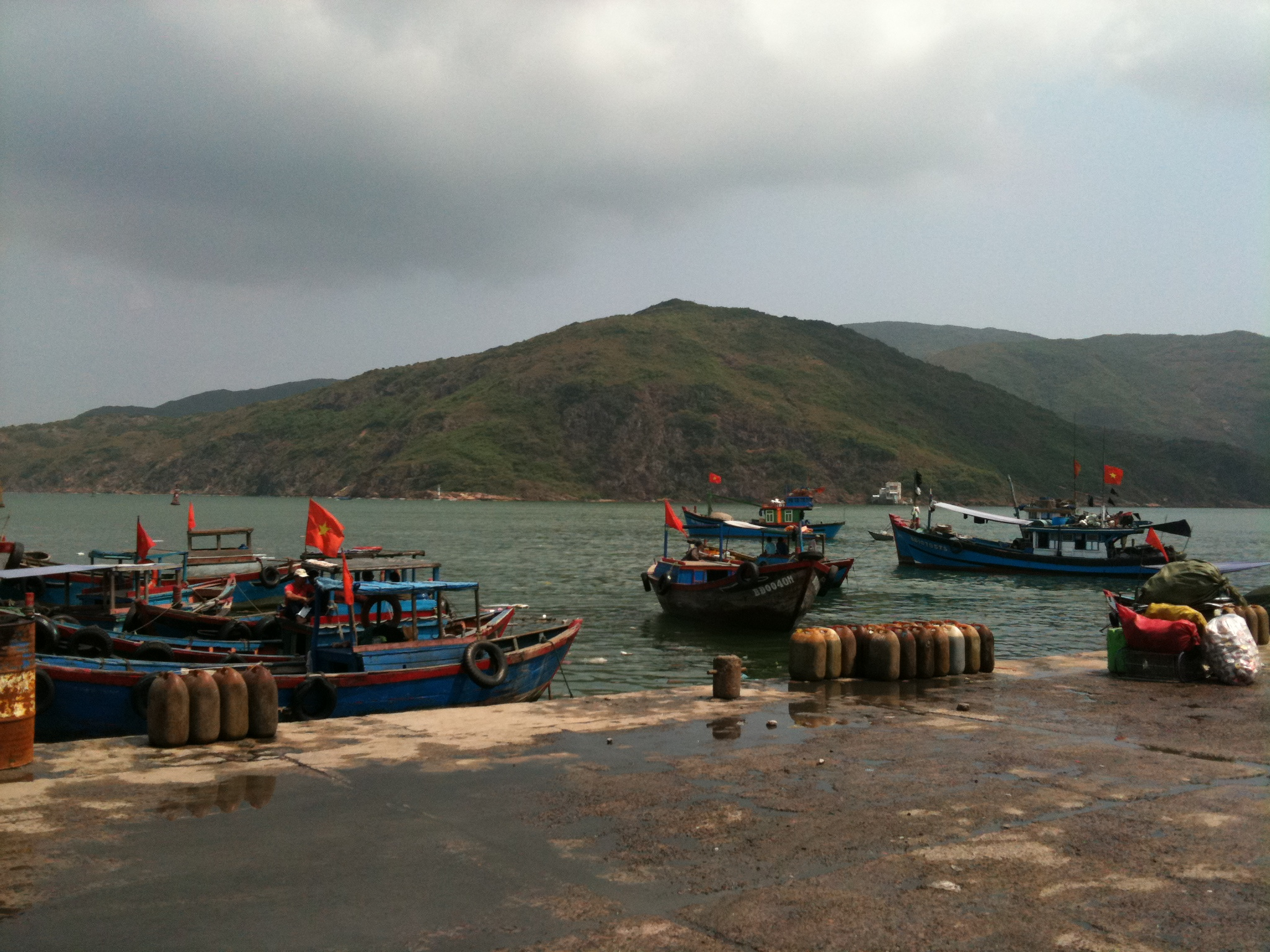
The boat docked at Quy Nhơn port

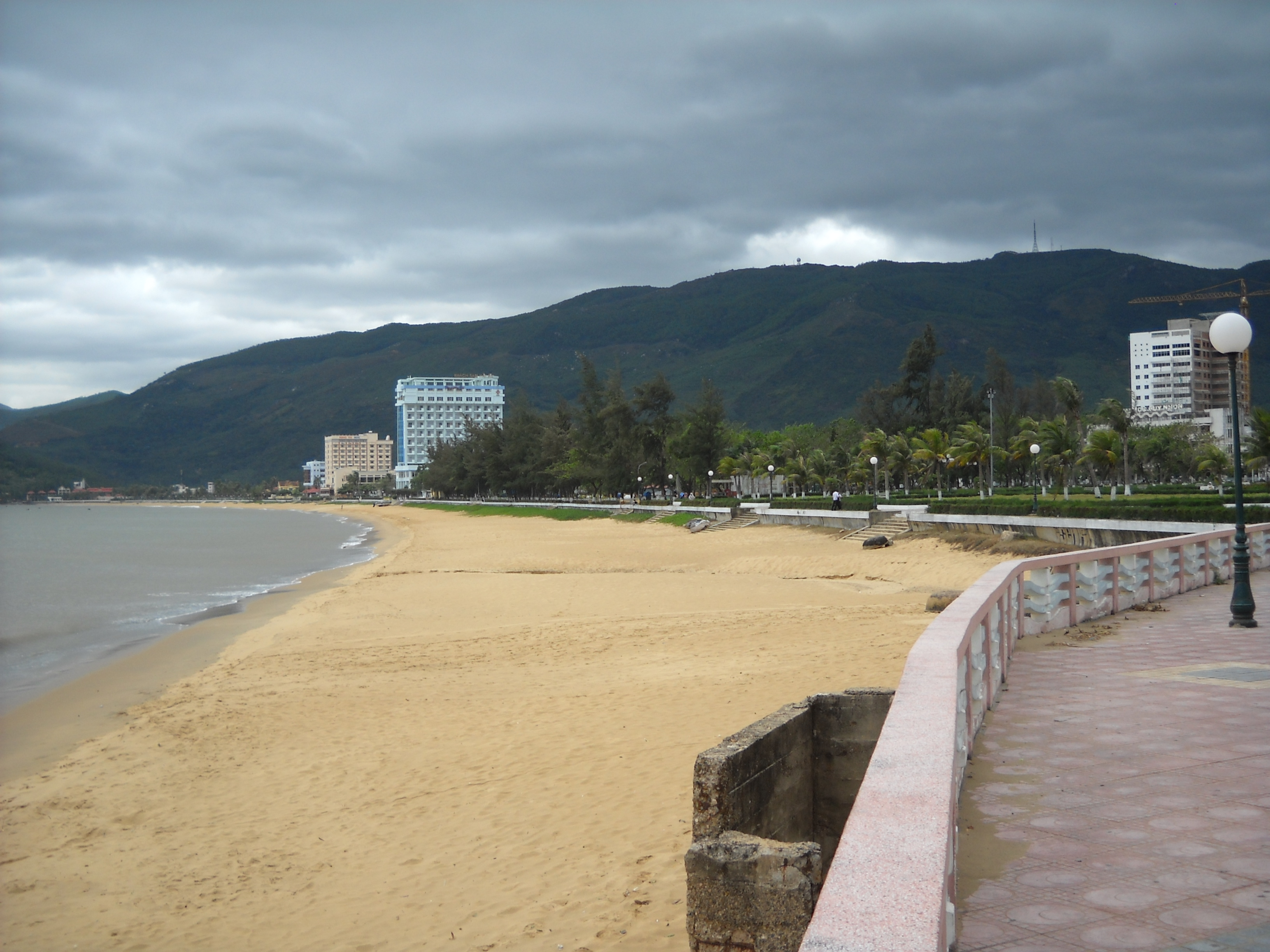
Quy Nhơn Beach

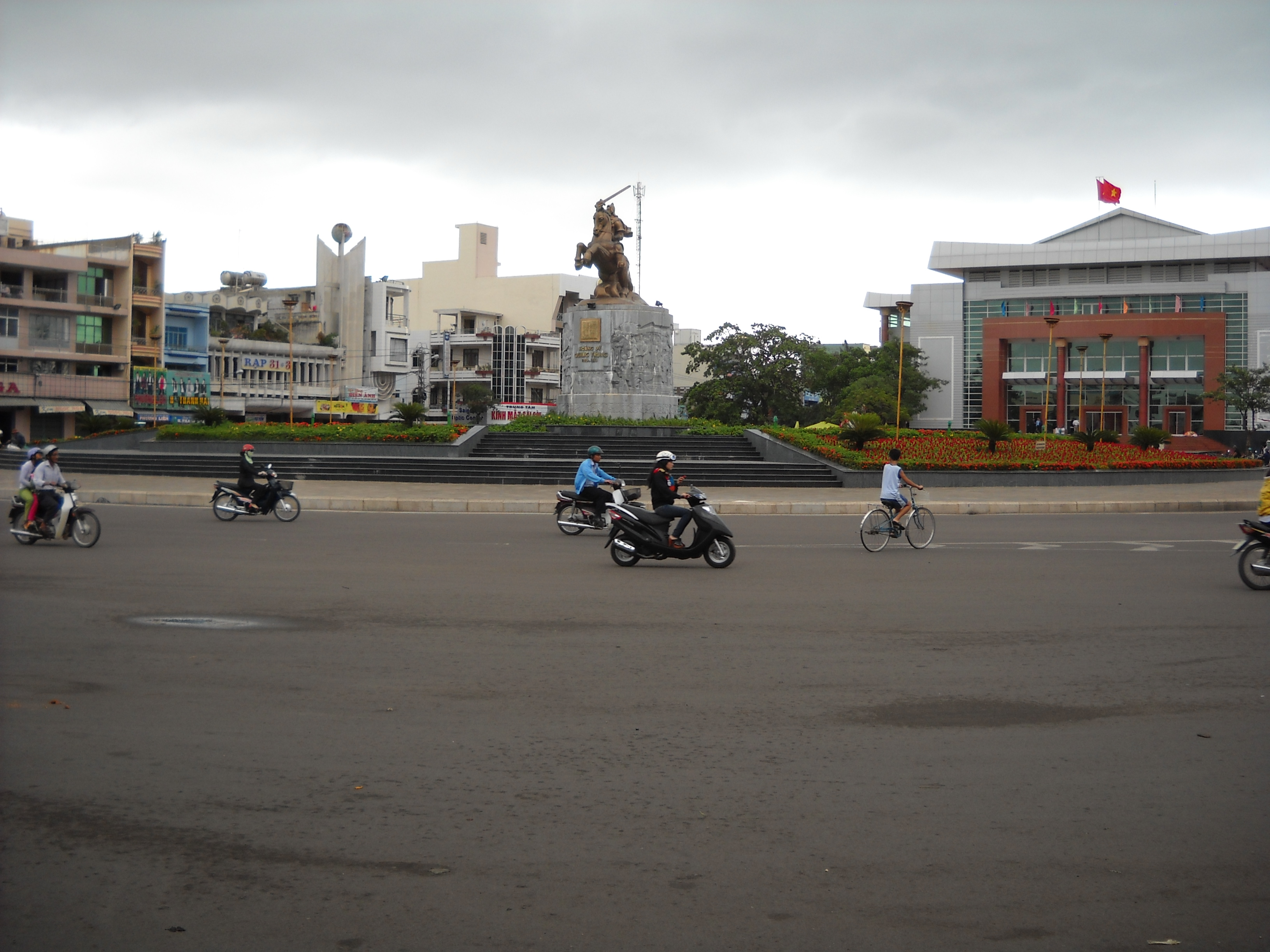
Statue of Quang Trung, Quy Nhơn

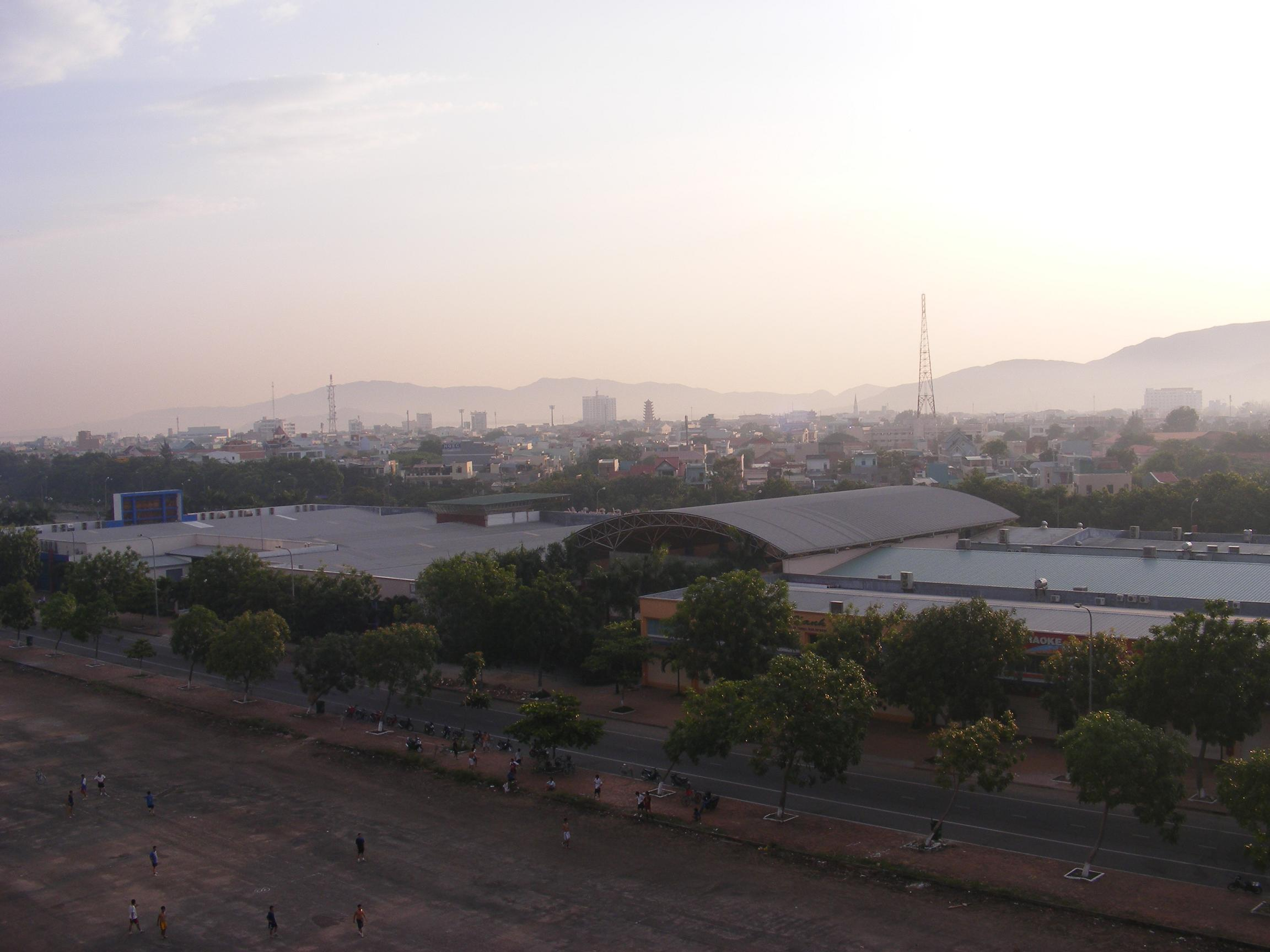
A corner of Quy Nhơn city in the early morning

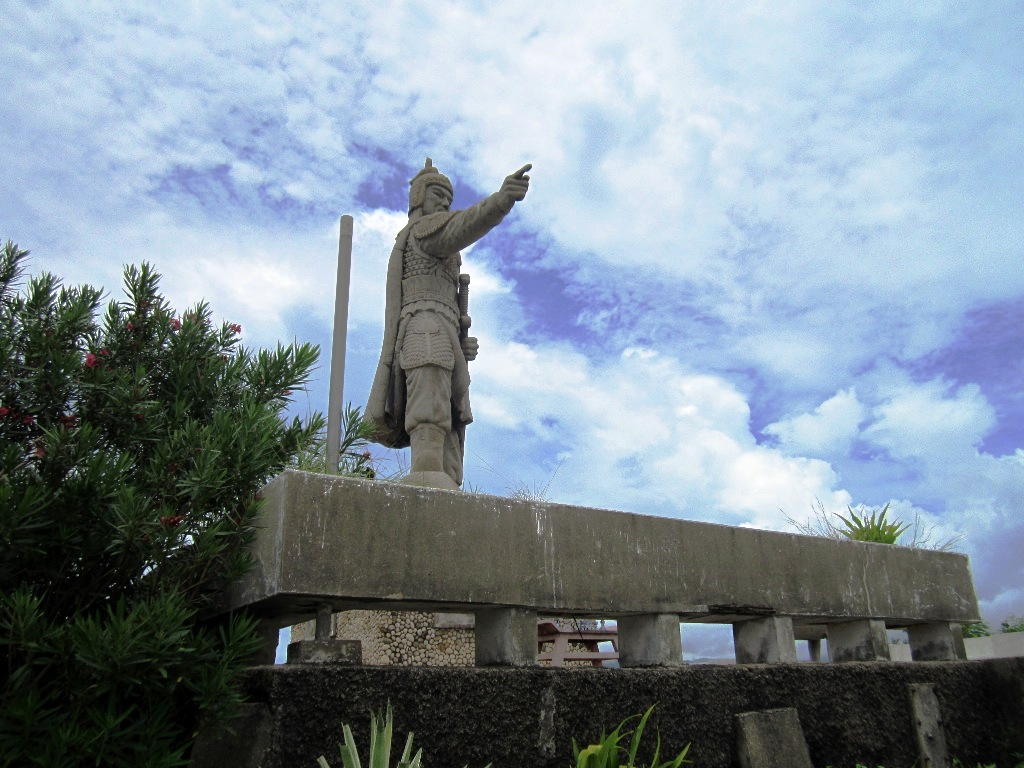
Trần Hưng Đạo monument in Hải Minh, Quy Nhon.

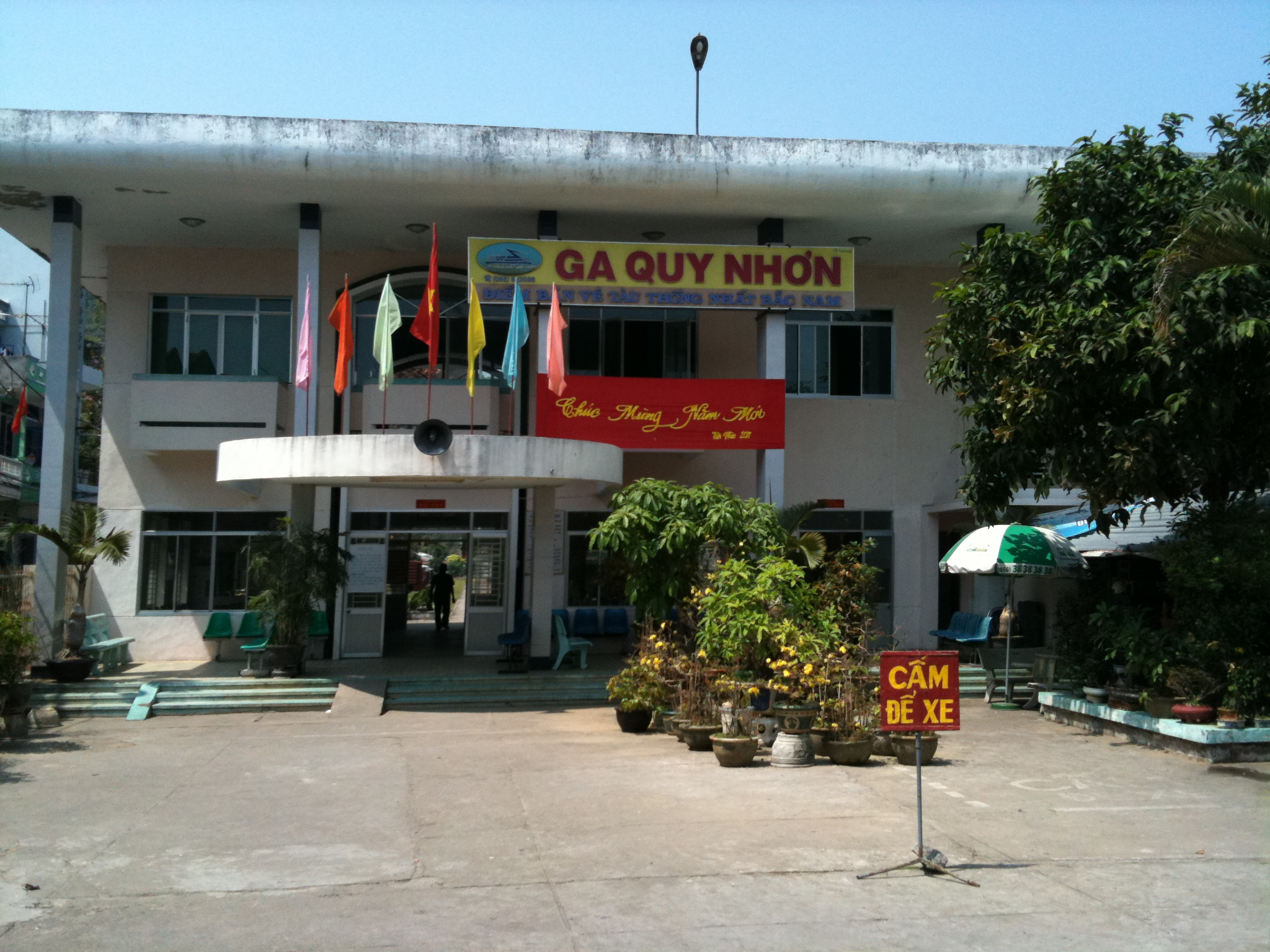
Quy Nhon train station.

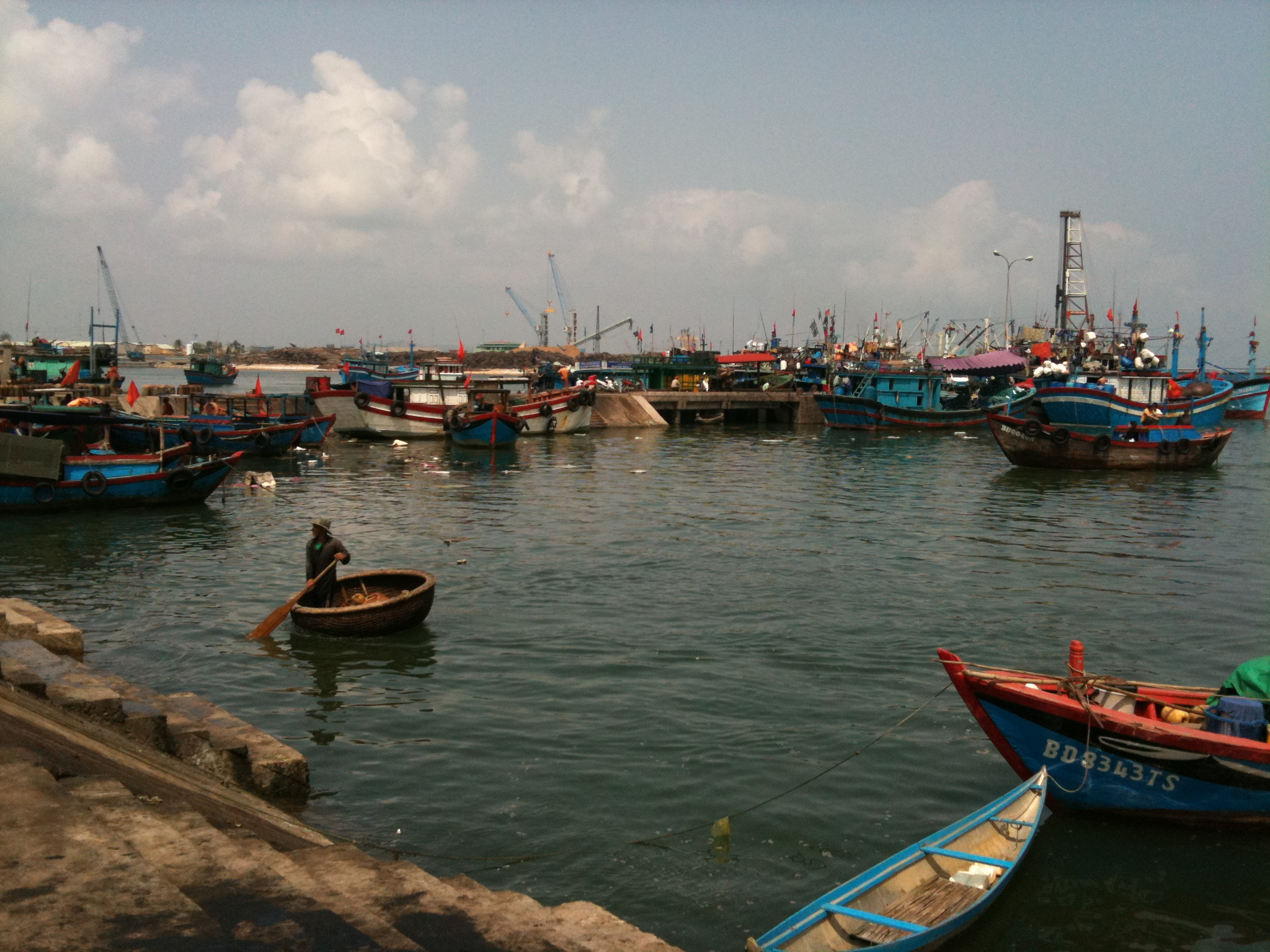
Fishing boats anchor at the port in Quy Nhon.

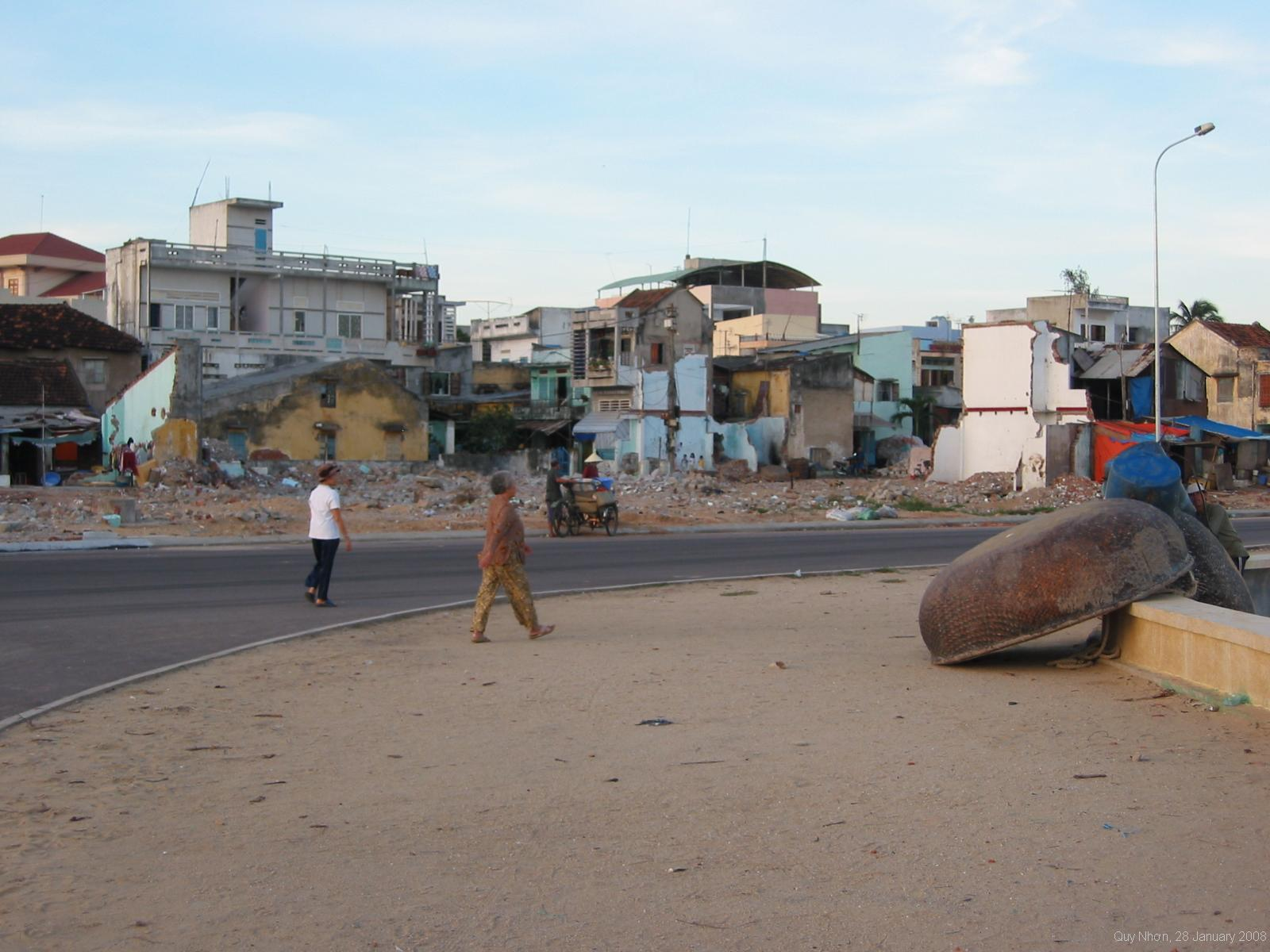
Quy Nhon in 2008.
