= Nhơn Hội Economic Zone =

Nhon Hoi Economic Zone (Vietnamese: Khu kinh tế Nhơn Hội) is new urban center in the east of Qui Nhơn, Vietnam. It includes or is planned to include residential areas, an industrial park, a deep water port, and a resort. It was established in 2005 and has a total area of 120 km^{2}, of which 14 km^{2} are reserved for an industrial park.

Nhon Hoi Economic Zone is connected to Qui Nhơn's city center and National Route 1 by Thị Nại Bridge, which reduced the road distance to the city to 7 km.

An oil $27bn refinery complex is planned to be built in the EZ and operational by 2017. The main investor is Thailand's PTT.
