= Phú Bình district =

Phú Bình District Huyện Phú Bình
- District
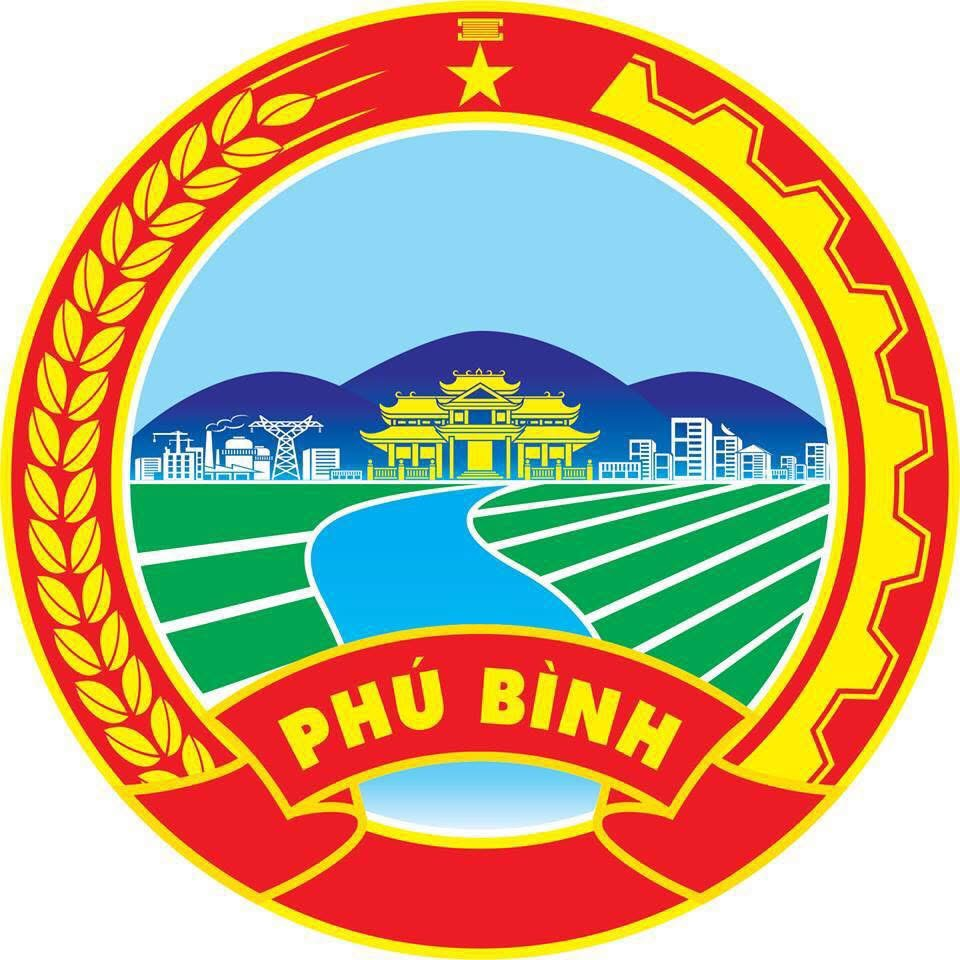
- Seal

- Location within Vietnam
- Coordinates: 21°29′36″N 105°57′42″E
- Country: Vietnam
- Region: Northeast
- Province: Thái Nguyên
- Capital: Hương Sơn

Area
  - District: 96 sq mi (249 km^{2})

Population (1 April, 2019)
  - District: 156.804
  - Urban: 9.456
- Time zone: UTC+7 (UTC + 7)

Phú Bình is a former rural district of Thái Nguyên province in the Northeast region of Vietnam. As of 2003 the district had a population of 139,753. The district covers an area of 249 km^{2}. The district capital lies at Hương Sơn.

== Administrative divisions ==
Hương Sơn, Bàn Đạt, Bảo Lý, Dương Thành, Đào Xá, Điềm Thụy, Đồng Liên, Hà Châu, Kha Sơn, Lương Phú, Nga My, Nhã Lộng, Tân Đức, Tân Hòa, Tân Khánh, Tân Kim, Tân Thành, Thanh Ninh, Thượng Đình, Úc Kỳ, Xuân Phương.
