= Tân Khánh, Ho Chi Minh City =

Tân Khánh Phường Tân Khánh Tân Phước Khánh
- Ward
- Interactive map of Tân Khánh
- Coordinates: 11°00′06″N 106°43′34″E
- Country: Vietnam
- Municipality: Ho Chi Minh City
- Established: June 16, 2025

Area
  - Total: 14.76 sq mi (38.23 km^{2})

Population (2024)
  - Total: 126,393
  - Density: 8,563/sq mi (3,306/km^{2})
- Time zone: UTC+07:00 (Indochina Time)
- Administrative code: 25891

Tân Khánh (Vietnamese: Phường Tân Khánh) is a ward of Ho Chi Minh City, Vietnam. It is one of the 168 new wards, communes and special zones of the city following the reorganization in 2025.

== History ==
On June 16, 2025, the National Assembly Standing Committee issued Resolution No. 1685/NQ-UBTVQH15 on the arrangement of commune-level administrative units of Ho Chi Minh City in 2025 (effective from June 16, 2025). Accordingly, the entire land area and population of Tân Vĩnh Hiệp, Tân Phước Khánh, Thạnh Phước wards, Thạnh Hội commune and part of Thái Hòa ward of the former Tân Uyên city will be integrated into a new ward named Tân Khánh (Clause 101, Article 1).
