= Hòa Lợi =

Hòa Lợi Phường Hòa Lợi Tân Định
- Ward
- Interactive map of Hòa Lợi
- Coordinates: 11°05′37″N 106°39′41″E
- Country: Vietnam
- Municipality: Ho Chi Minh City
- Established: June 16, 2025

Area
  - Total: 12.97 sq mi (33.59 km^{2})

Population (2024)
  - Total: 79,694
  - Density: 6,145/sq mi (2,373/km^{2})
- Time zone: UTC+07:00 (Indochina Time)
- Administrative code: 25849

Hòa Lợi (Vietnamese: Phường Hòa Lợi) is a ward of Ho Chi Minh City, Vietnam. It is one of the 168 new wards, communes and special zones of the city following the reorganization in 2025.

== Geography ==
According to Official Dispatch No. 2896/BNV-CQĐP dated May 27, 2025 of the Ministry of Home Affairs, following the merger, Hòa Lợi has a land area of 33.59 km², the population as of December 31, 2024 is 79,694 people, the population density is 2,372 people/km².

== History ==
On June 16, 2025, the National Assembly Standing Committee issued Resolution No. 1685/NQ-UBTVQH15 on the arrangement of commune-level administrative units of Ho Chi Minh City in 2025 (effective from June 16, 2025). Accordingly, the entire land area and population of Tân Định and Hòa Lợi wards of the former Bến Cát city will be integrated into a new ward named Hòa Lợi (Clause 91, Article 1).
