= Tân Uyên (city) =

Tân Uyên Thành phố Tân Uyên
- Provincial City (Class-3)
- Location in Vietnam
- Coordinates: 11°03′03″N 106°45′49″E
- Country: Vietnam
- Province: Bình Dương
- Established as city: 10 April 2023
- Dissolved: 16 June 2025
- People's Committee Headquarters: Uyên Hưng Ward

Area
  - Total: 191.76 km^{2} (74.04 sq mi)

Population (2022)
  - Total: 466,053
  - Density: 2,430.4/km^{2} (6,294.7/sq mi)
- Time zone: UTC+7 (ICT)

Tân Uyên was a provincial city of Bình Dương province in the Southeast region of Vietnam. It was established as a city in April 2023 on the basis of the former Tân Uyên town and dissolved in June 2025 as part of a nationwide administrative rearrangement. As of 2022, the city had a population of 466,053. The city covered an area of 191.76 km^{2}, with a population density of approximately 2,430 inhabitants per km^{2}.

== History ==
The region of Tân Uyên has a long history dating back to the 17th century, when Vietnamese settlers migrated southward during the Trịnh–Nguyễn civil war, forming prosperous villages. During the French colonial period, it was part of Biên Hòa Province.In the 20th century, Tân Uyên played a role in Vietnam's revolutionary struggles. Notable historical sites include the Tháp canh cầu Bà Kiên, site of a 1965 victory against American forces, and the Chiến khu Vĩnh Lợi war zone, a base for revolutionary activities leading to the liberation of Thủ Dầu Một in 1975. The Đình Bưng Cù temple also reflects the area's cultural heritage, with the village renamed Tân Phước Khánh in 1926. Administratively, Tân Uyên District was established in the mid-20th century and underwent several changes. In 2013, Tân Uyên town was formed from part of the district, with the remainder becoming Bắc Tân Uyên District. The town was upgraded to city status in 2023, becoming the fourth city in Bình Dương Province. It was dissolved on 16 June 2025, with its territory reorganized into new administrative units as part of provincial mergers.

== Geography ==
Tân Uyên was situated in the southeastern part of Bình Dương Province, bordering the cities of Thủ Dầu Một, Thuận An, and Dĩ An. The Đồng Nai River flowed through the city, with two communes, Bạch Đằng and Thạnh Hội, located as river islands.

== Economy ==
Tân Uyên experienced rapid economic growth, averaging 13% annually since becoming a town in 2013. The economy was dominated by industry, accounting for over 70% of the structure, with major industrial parks such as VSIP II (2,045 ha) and VSIP III. It attracted significant foreign direct investment and featured infrastructure developments like the Bắc Tân Uyên - Phú Giáo - Bàu Bàng road. Tourism potential was also being developed, aiming to become a key sector by 2030.

== Administrative divisions ==
Prior to its dissolution in 2025, Tân Uyên City was divided into 10 wards and 2 communes:

Wards: Hội Nghĩa, Khánh Bình, Phú Chánh, Tân Hiệp, Tân Phước Khánh, Tân Vĩnh Hiệp, Thái Hòa, Thạnh Phước, Uyên Hưng, Vĩnh Tân

Communes: Bạch Đằng, Thạnh Hội

In 2025, these units were merged and reorganized, with new wards such as Tân Uyên formed from mergers including Uyên Hưng, Bạch Đằng, and parts of neighboring areas.
