= Xishuangbanna railway station =

Railway station in Xishuangbanna, Yunnan

Xishuangbanna 西双版纳
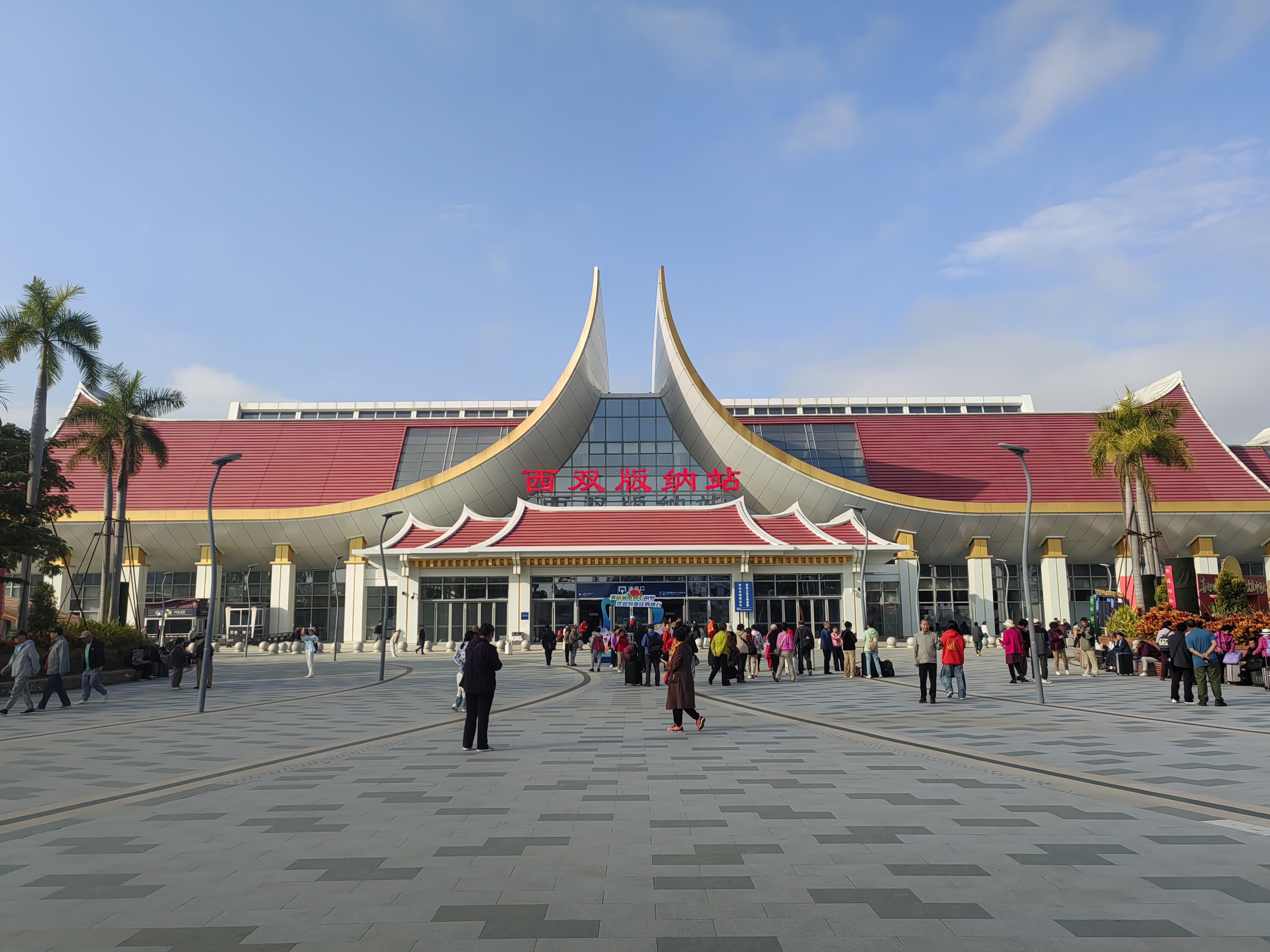
- Exterior of the station in 2025

General information
- Location: Jinghong, Xishuangbanna Dai Autonomous Prefecture, Yunnan; China
- Coordinates: 21°59′9.51″N 100°46′18.46″E
- Line: Yuxi–Mohan railway

History
- Opened: 3 December 2021

Services
Preceding station	China Railway	Following station
Mengyang towards Yuxi	Yuxi–Mohan railway	Ganlanba towards Mohan
Location

Xishuangbanna railway station (Chinese: 西双版纳站) is a railway station in Jinghong, Xishuangbanna Dai Autonomous Prefecture, Yunnan, China. It opened with the Yuxi–Mohan railway on 3 December 2021.

It is located close to Xishuangbanna Gasa International Airport, but isn't directly connected.
