= Boten =

Town in Luang Namtha, Laos

Boten ບໍ່ເຕັນ 磨丁
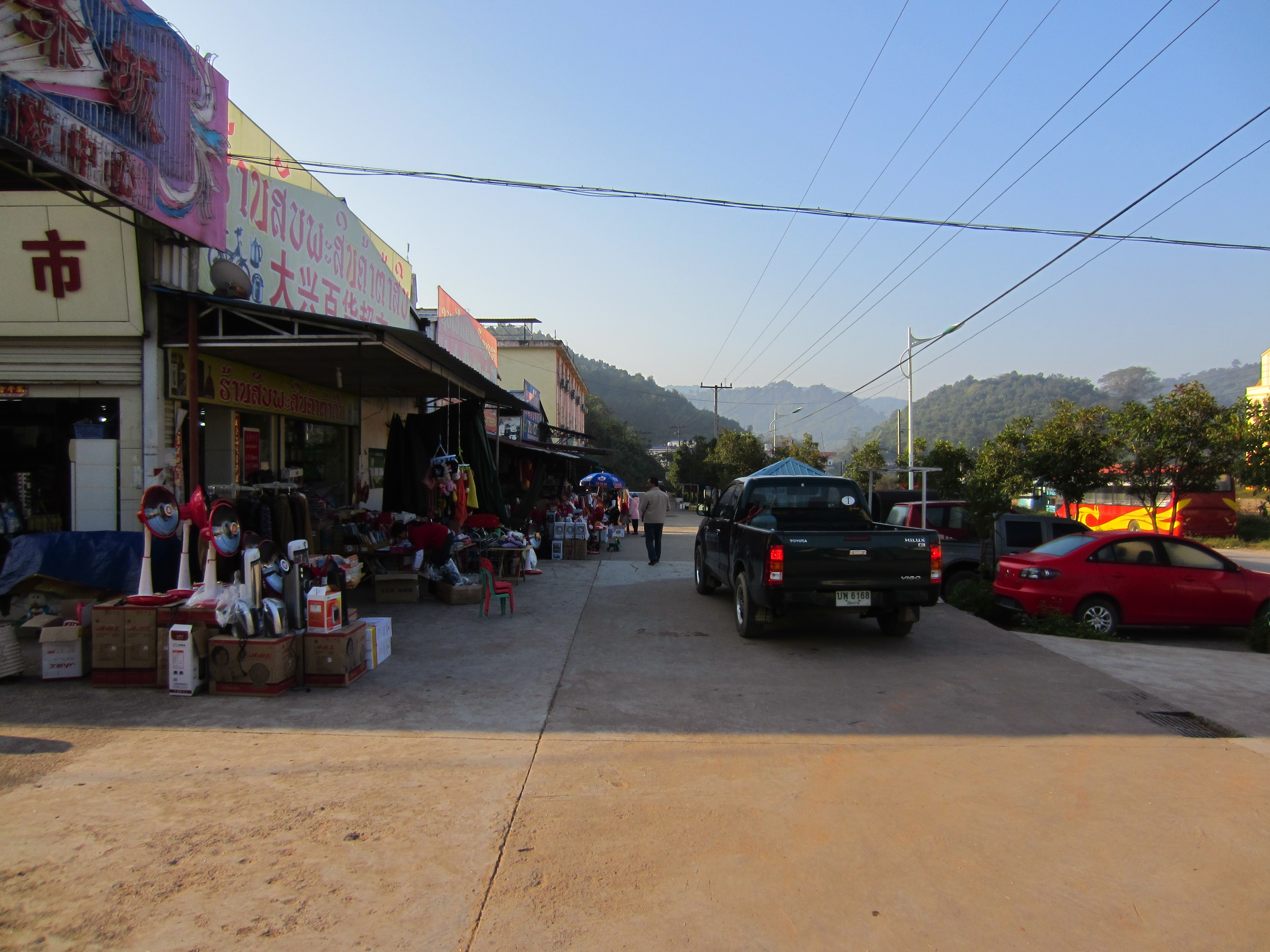

- Location within Laos
- Coordinates: 21.1841°N 101.6720°E
- Country: Laos
- Province: Luang Namtha
- Time zone: UTC+8 (Beijing Time)
- Website: www.boten.com

Boten (Lao: ບໍ່ເຕັນ, pronounced [bɔ̄ː.tèn]; Chinese: 磨丁) is a town in Laos located in Luang Namtha Province, situated on the China–Laos border opposite the Chinese town of Mohan. Although Boten is part of Laos, most of its inhabitants speak Mandarin Chinese as their native language. The town operates on Beijing time.

== Economy ==
Boten allows the use of both the Lao kip and the Chinese yuan.

The Boten Special Economic Zone is currently under development. The town is aiming to transition from its former gambling-focused economy to one centered on logistics and tourism.

== Transport ==
After five years of construction, both the Vientiane–Boten Railway and Yuxi–Mohan railways opened in December 2021, connecting Boten south towards Vientiane and north towards Kunming, China via the China–Laos Railway Friendship Tunnel.

Boten is the northernmost Lao town on the 414 km railway, which features 198 km of tunnels and 62 km of bridges, and operates at a speed of 160 km per hour. The town is served by Boten railway station.

== Casino ==
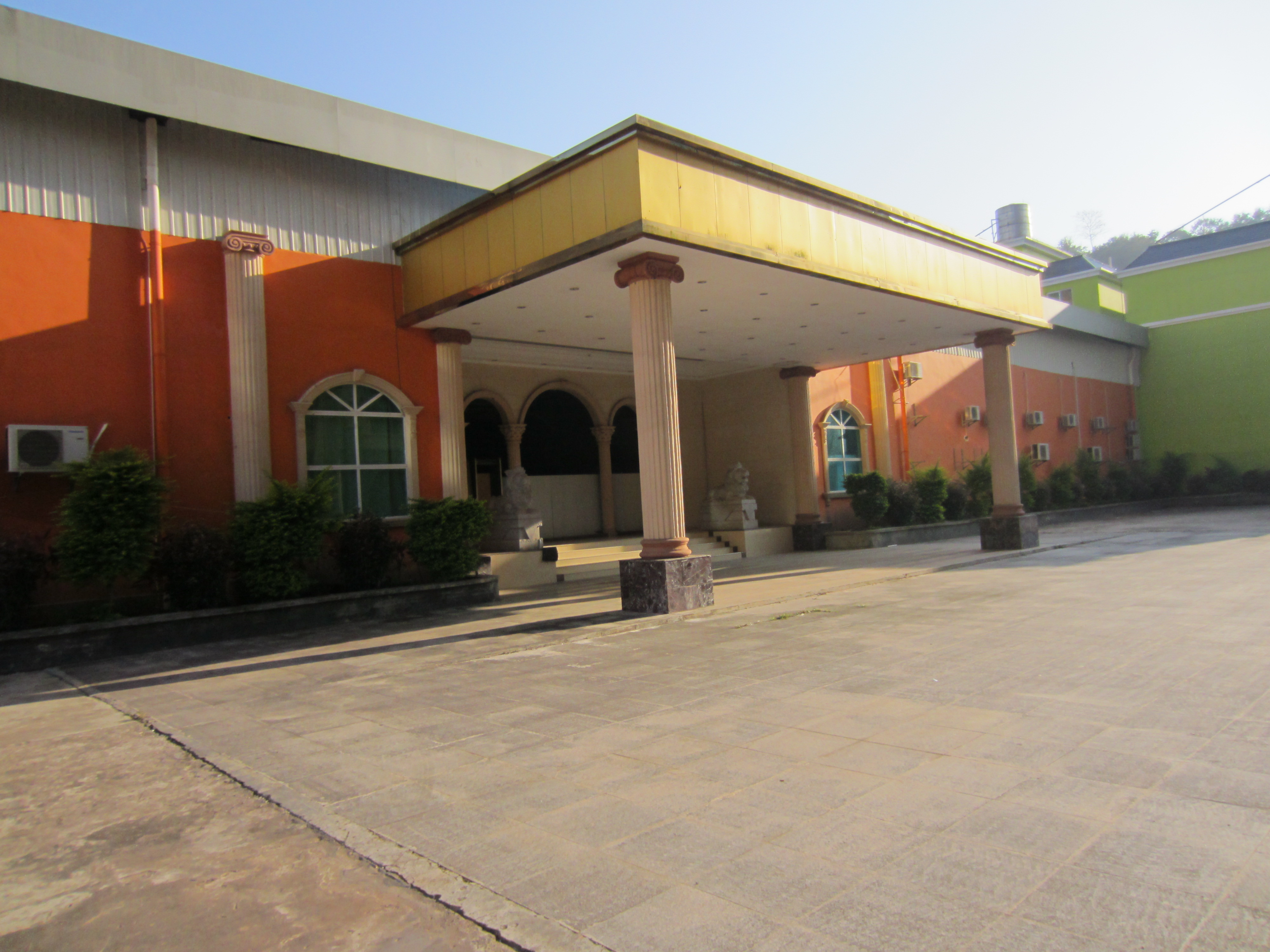
The Boten casino (2013)

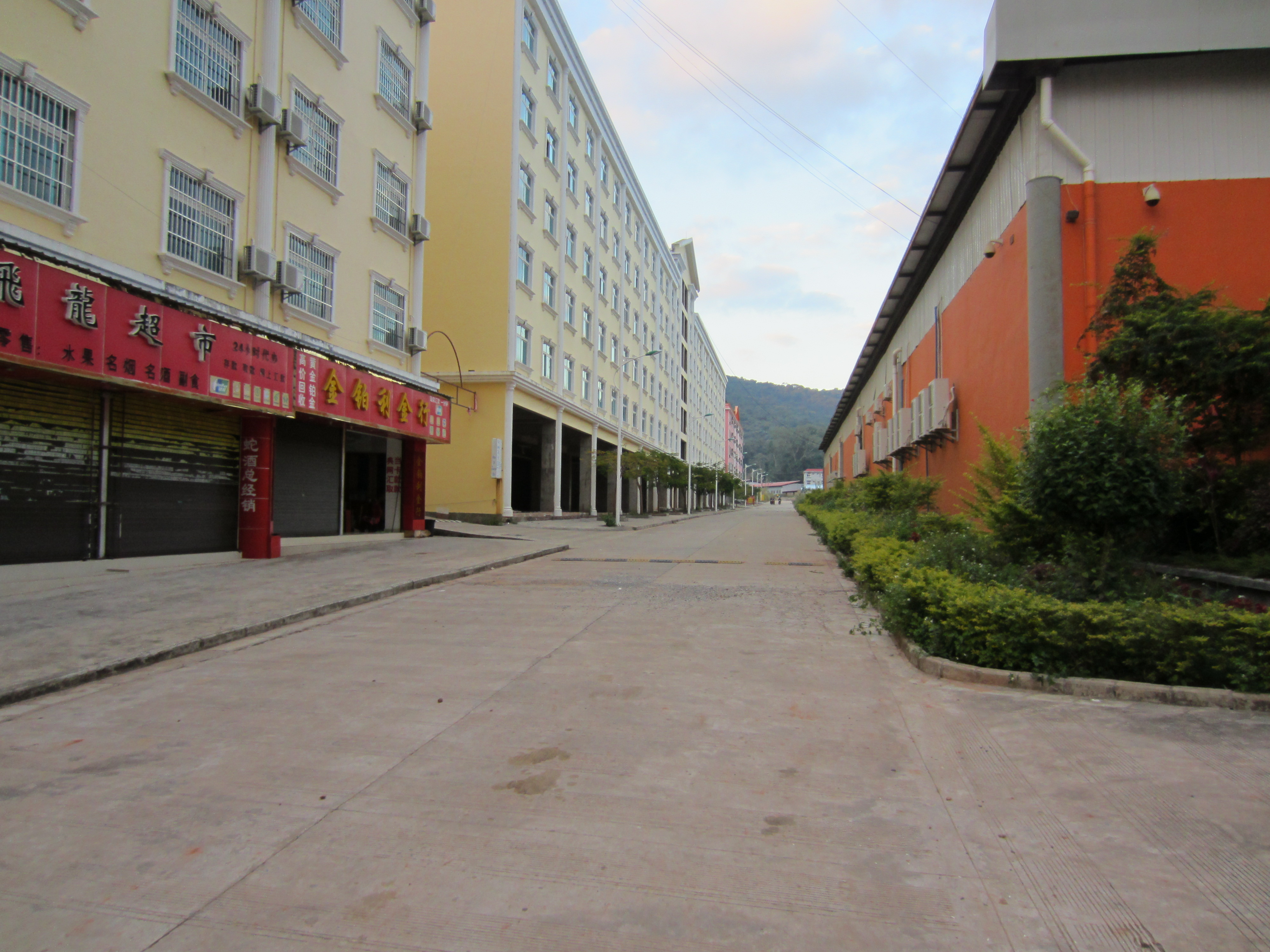
An abandoned street in Boten (2013)

In 2002, a big casino was built in Boten, primarily attracting Chinese visitors, as gambling is illegal in China. In 2011, the Chinese government requested that Laos close the casino. Today the casino stands abandoned.
