= China–Laos border =

International border

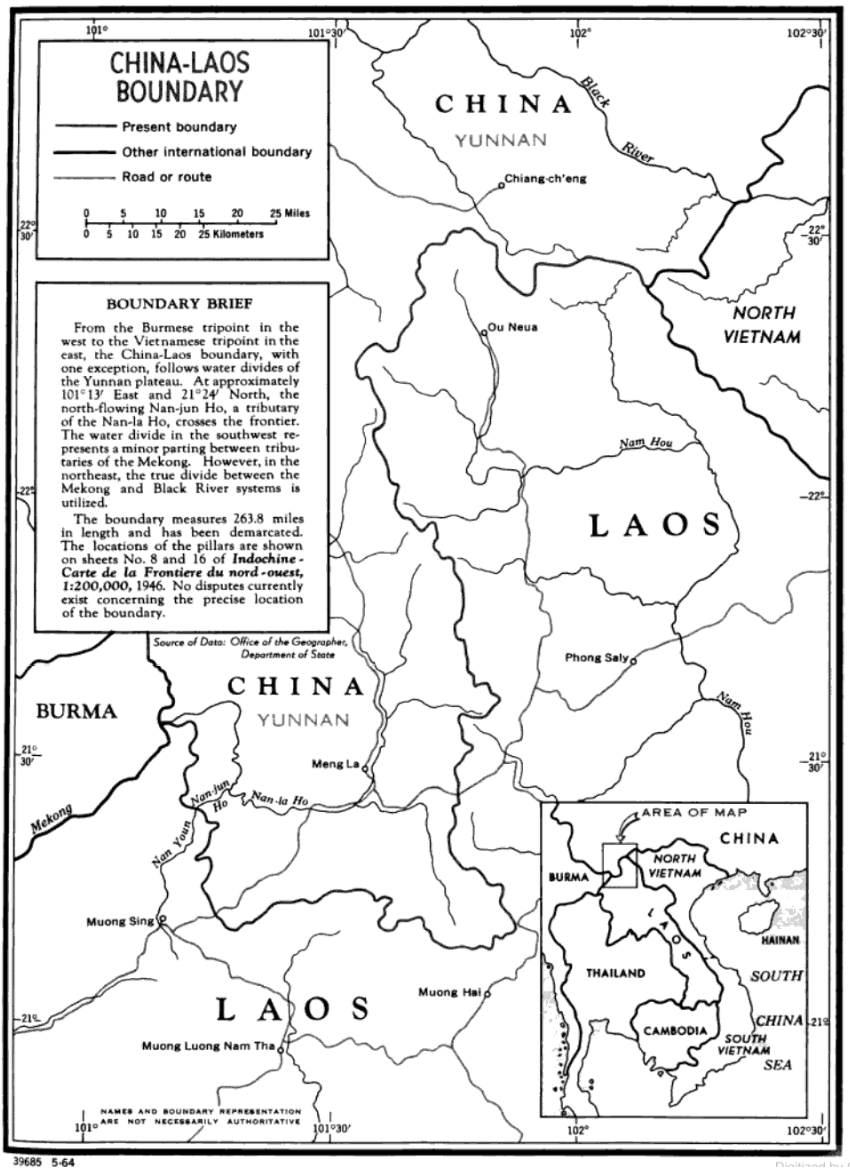
Map of the China-Laos border

Chinese and Laotian boundary markers

The China–Laos border is the international boundary between China and Laos, which runs for 505 kilometres (314 mi) from the tripoint with Myanmar in the west to the tripoint with Vietnam in the east.

== Description ==
The border starts in the west at the tripoint with Myanmar on the Mekong River, proceeding southwards via a series of irregular overland lines. The border then turns sharply eastward and continues overland, before turning sharply northward, continuing in that direction for some distance, before again turning eastward and terminating at the Vietnamese tripoint at the Shiceng Dashan peak.

The border on both sides is predominantly inhabited by minority people groups. Topographically it is mountainous and forested, with some limited agriculture. On the Laotian side the border lie the provinces of Luang Namtha, Oudomxai and Phongsali, whilst the entirety of China's side belongs to the province of Yunnan.

== History ==
The border area was historically remote from the centres of both Chinese and Lao power. From the 1860s France began establishing a presence in the region, initially in modern Cambodia and Vietnam, and the colony of French Indochina was created in 1887. France and China had already determined the border between Tonkin (northern Vietnam) and China in 1887 following the Sino-French War. Laos was then added to the colony in 1893 following the Franco-Siamese crisis, and a border agreement delimiting the China-Laos boundary at its current position was signed on 20 June 1895. It was later demarcated on the ground with a series of pillars.

Laos obtained a partial independence from France in 1949, around the time when Mao Zedong established the People's Republic of China after defeating Chiang Kai Shek's nationalist government in the Chinese Civil War. Consequently, China's adaptation of Stalinist principles in the form of Maoism influenced Laotian politics, fuelling demands for total independence from France, which was granted in 1953. The boundary then became one between two sovereign independent states. The border was re-surveyed and demarcated in April 1992.

== Border crossings ==
There are two border crossings. The main one is located at Mohan-Boten. A second crossing is at Lantouy further northeast (only for Chinese and Laotian citizens). The Vientiane–Boten railway and the Yuxi–Mohan railway connecting Kunming with Vientiane opened on 3 December 2021.

== Historical maps ==
Historical maps of the border from west to east in the International Map of the World, Operational Navigation Chart and Tactical Pilotage Chart, late 20th century:

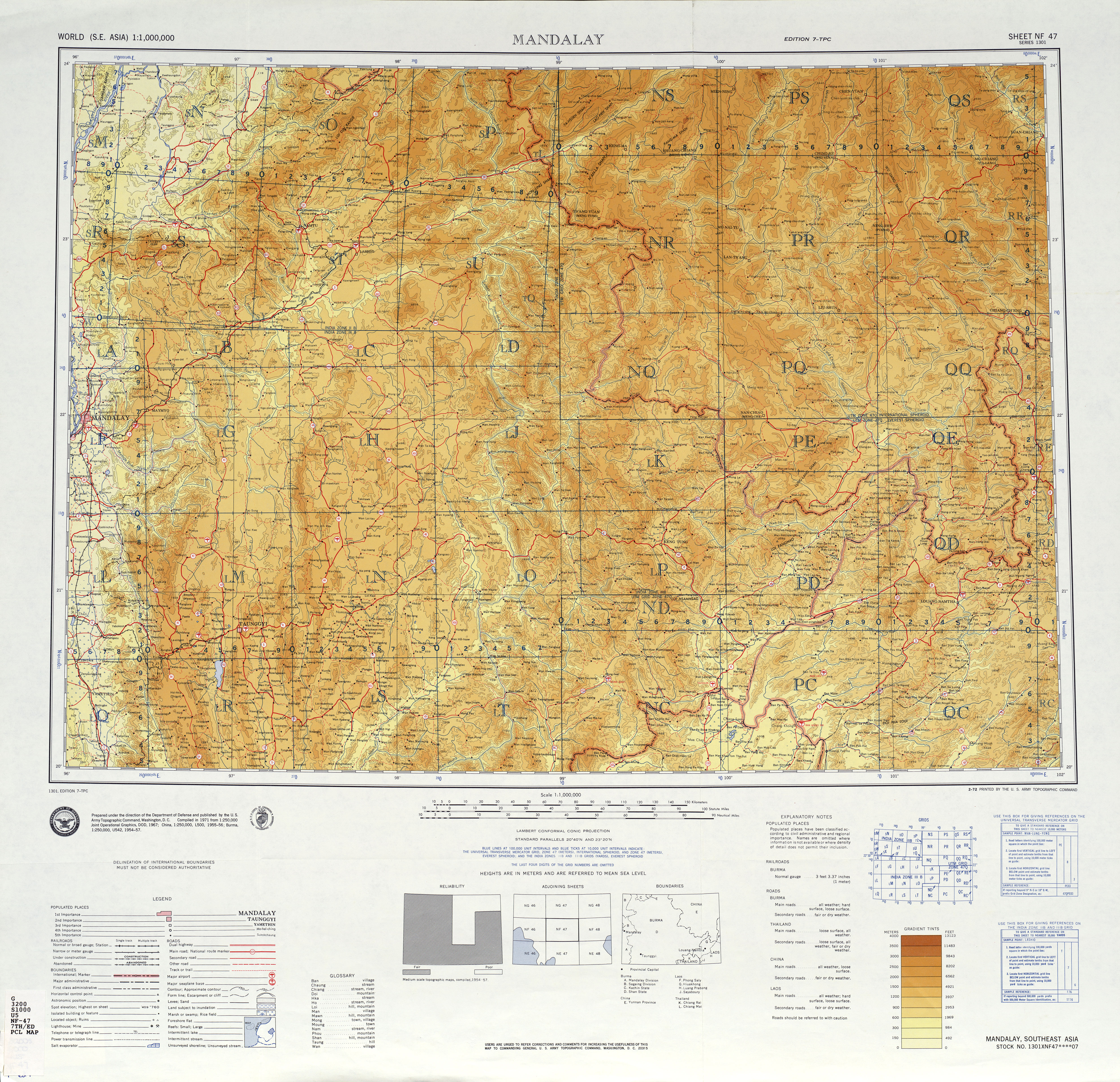

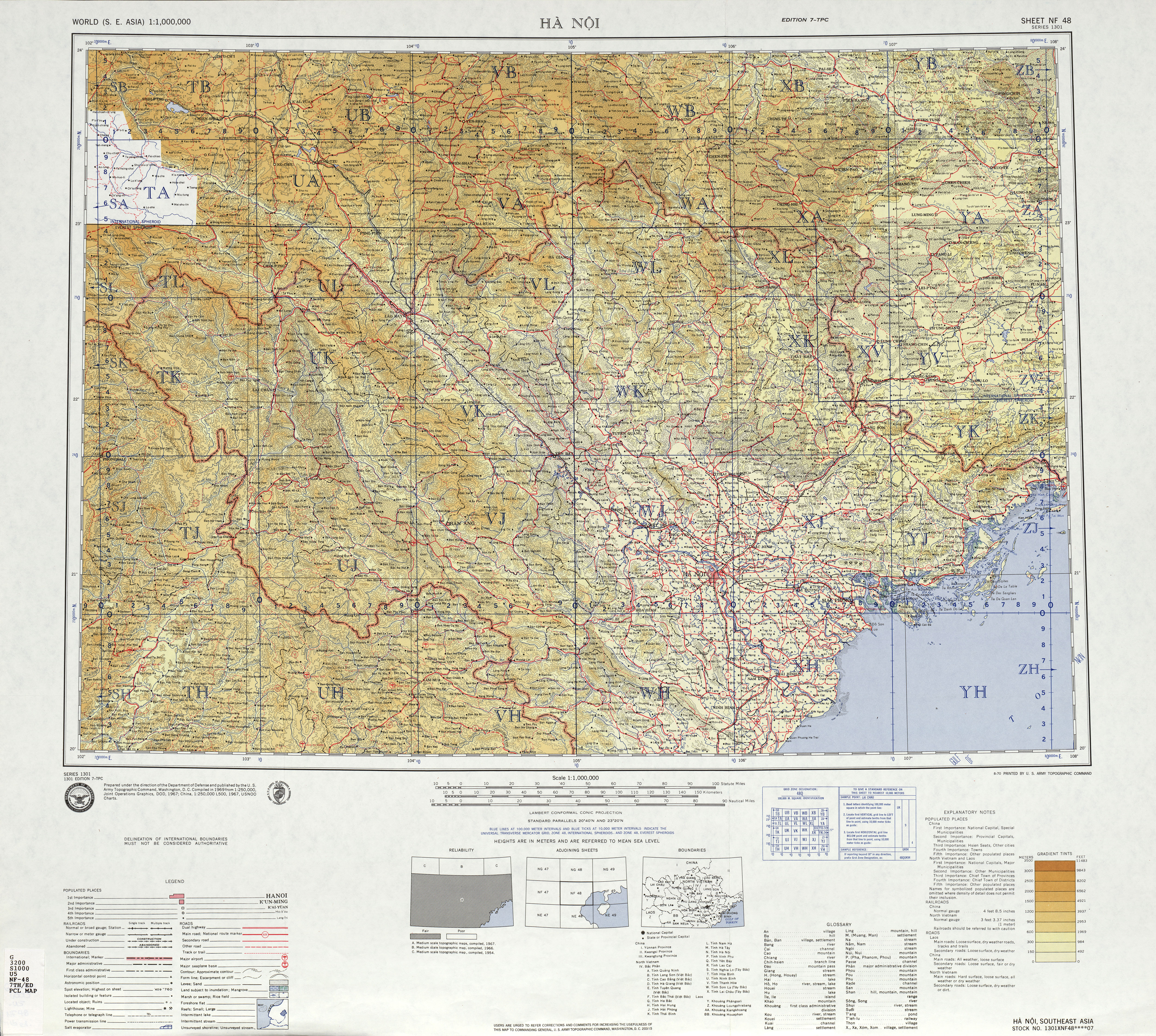

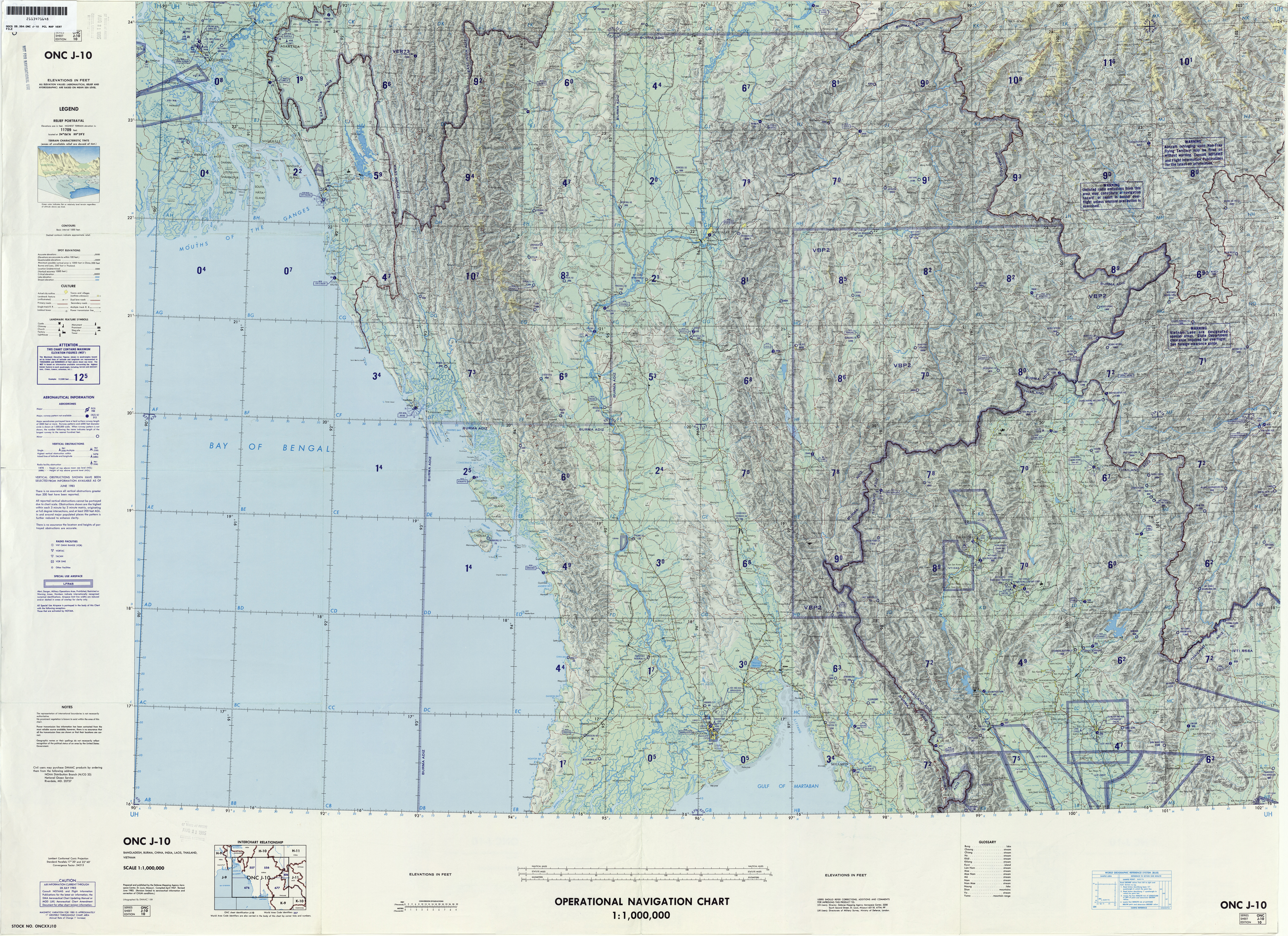

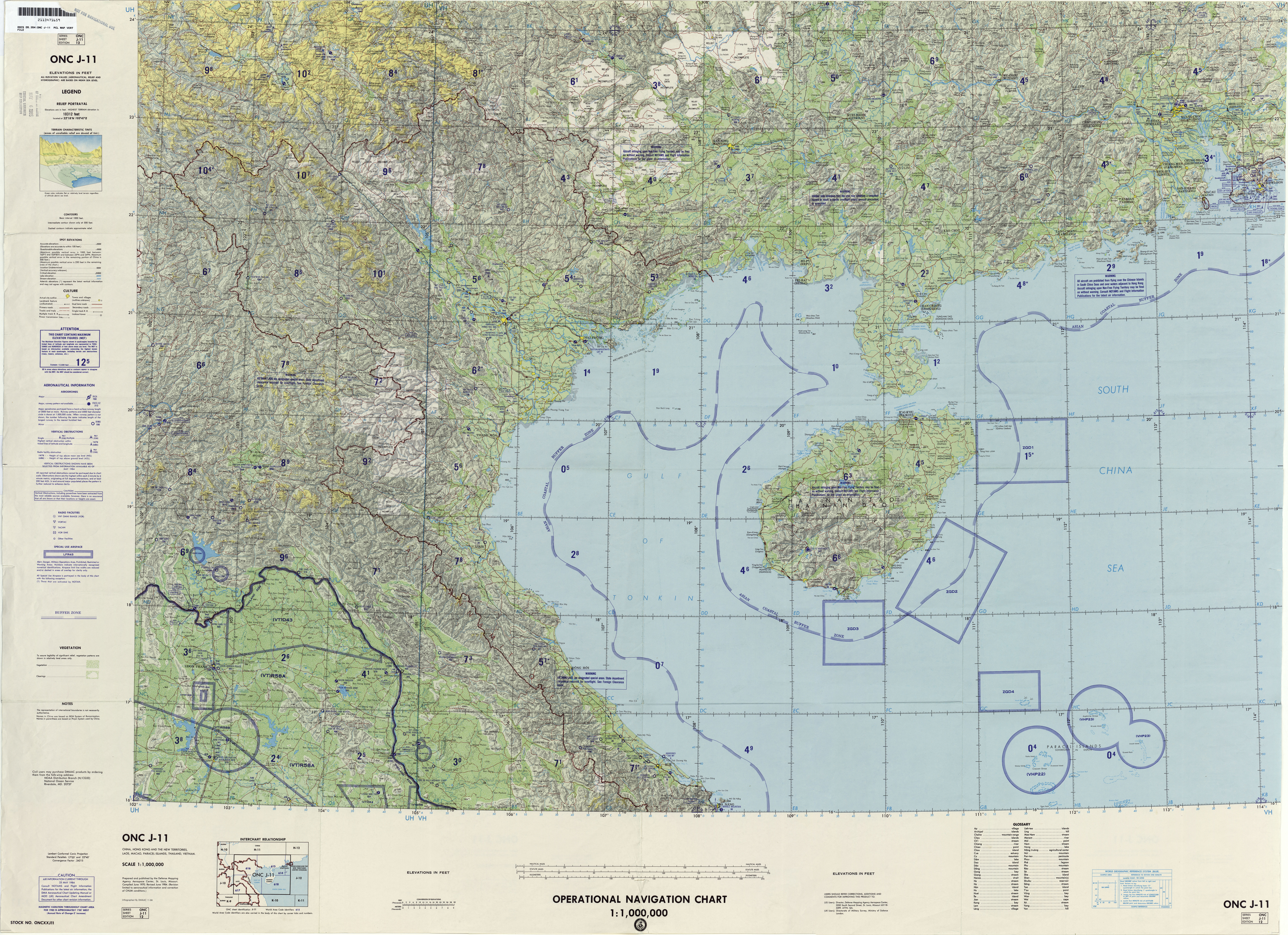

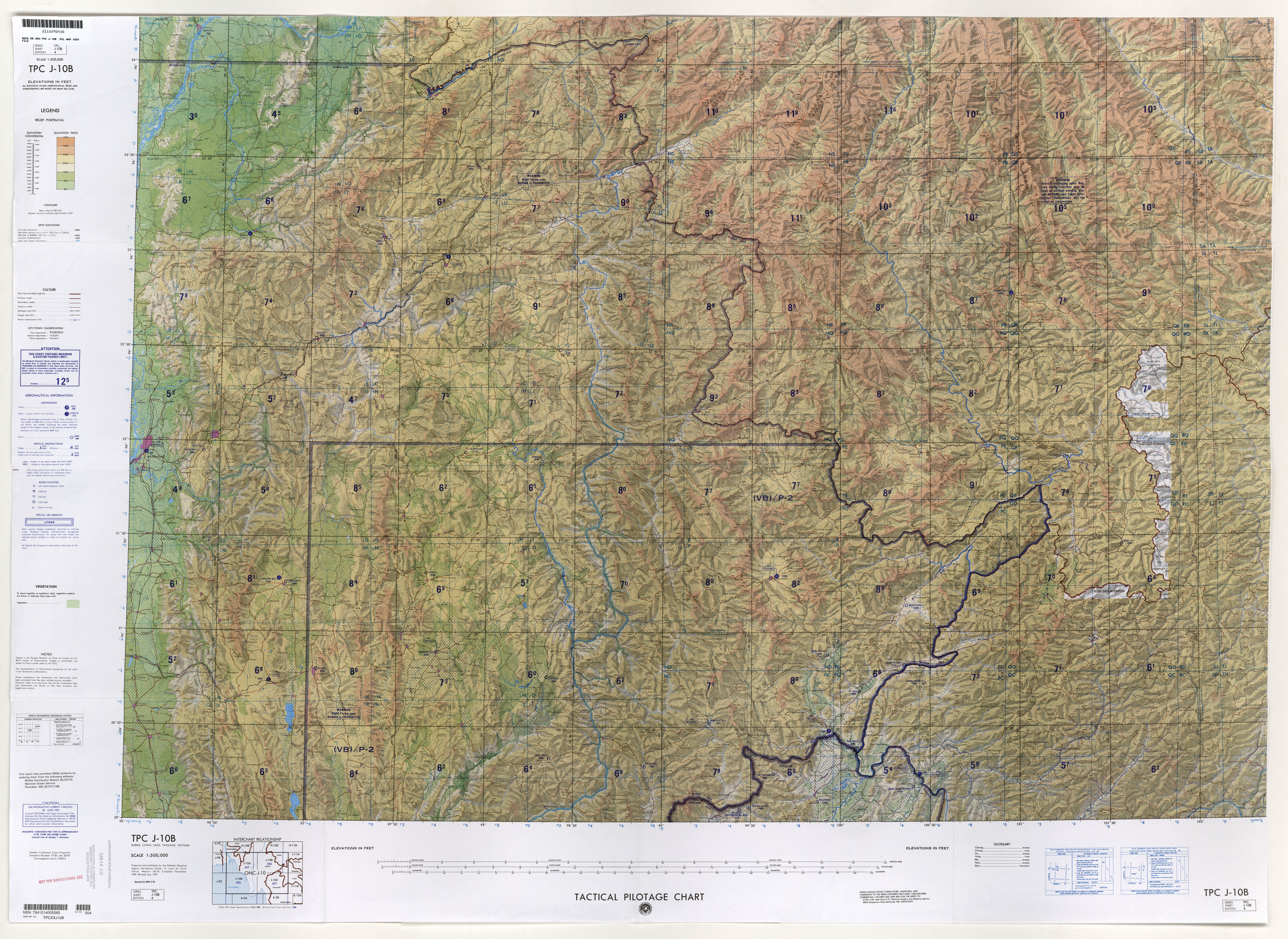

== See also ==
- Ports of entry of China
- China–Laos relations
