= Dao Shixun =

Chao Mom Kham Lue, Chinese name Dao Shixun (刀世勋; September 1928 – October 1, 2017) was the last native chief of Sipsongpanna, and a professor of linguistics. He was born in Jinghong. He was the 28th Chao Phaen Din.

== Publications ==
- Parlons lü: la langue taï des "douze mille rizières" du Yunnan
- History of the Zhaopanlings of Jinghong
- The influence of the Pali language of Dai
