= China–Laos Railway Friendship Tunnel =

Railway tunnel linking China and Laos

Overview
- Line: China–Laos railway
- Location: China, Laos
- System: China Railway
- Start: Mohan, Mengla, Xishuangbanna, Yunnan, People's Republic of China (21.2334°N 101.7195°E)
- End: Boten, Laos (21.1610°N 101.6742°E)

Operation
- Opened: 3 December 2021
- Owner: China Railway
- Operator: China Railway Kunming Group

Technical
- Length: 9,950 m (32,640 ft)
- Track gauge: 1,435 mm (4 ft 8 1/2 in)
- Electrified: 25,000V, 50Hz

The China–Laos Railway Friendship Tunnel (Chinese: 中老鐵路友誼隧道, Chung-lao tʻieh-lu you-yi sui-tao, Lao: ອຸໂມງມິດຕະພາບ) is a cross-border railway tunnel that connects China to Laos. The tunnel, which opened in 2021, spans a total length of 9.59 km—7.17 km lie within China, while the remaining 2.42 km extend into Laos. Its given name symbolizes the deep friendship between the two countries' peoples.
