= Xinzhai (disambiguation) =

Xinzhai is a Bronze Age archaeological site in Henan, China.

Xinzhai may also refer to a number of locations in China:

== Towns ==
Written as "新宅镇":

- Xinzhai, Wuyi County, Zhejiang, in Wuyi County, Zhejiang

Written as "辛寨镇":

- Xinzhai, Linqu County, in Linqu County, Shandong
- Xinzhai, Yucheng, Shandong, in Yucheng City, Shandong

Written as "新寨镇":

- Xinzhai, Weiyuan County, Gansu, in Weiyuan County, Gansu
- Xinzhai, Laoting County, Hebei

== Townships ==
Written as "辛寨乡":

- Xinzhai Township, Zhangqiu, in Zhangqiu City, Shandong

Written as "新寨乡":

- Xinzhai Township, Tanchang County, in Tanchang County, Gansu
- Xinzhai Township, Changshun County, in Changshun County, Guizhou
- Xinzhai Township, Yinjiang County, in Yinjiang Tujia and Miao Autonomous County, Guizhou
- Xinzhai Township, Wuzhai County, in Wuzhai County, Shanxi

== Villages ==
Written as "新寨村":

- Xinzhai, Mengla County, Yunnan
