= Mohan railway station =

Railway station in Mengla, Yunnan, China

Mohan 磨憨
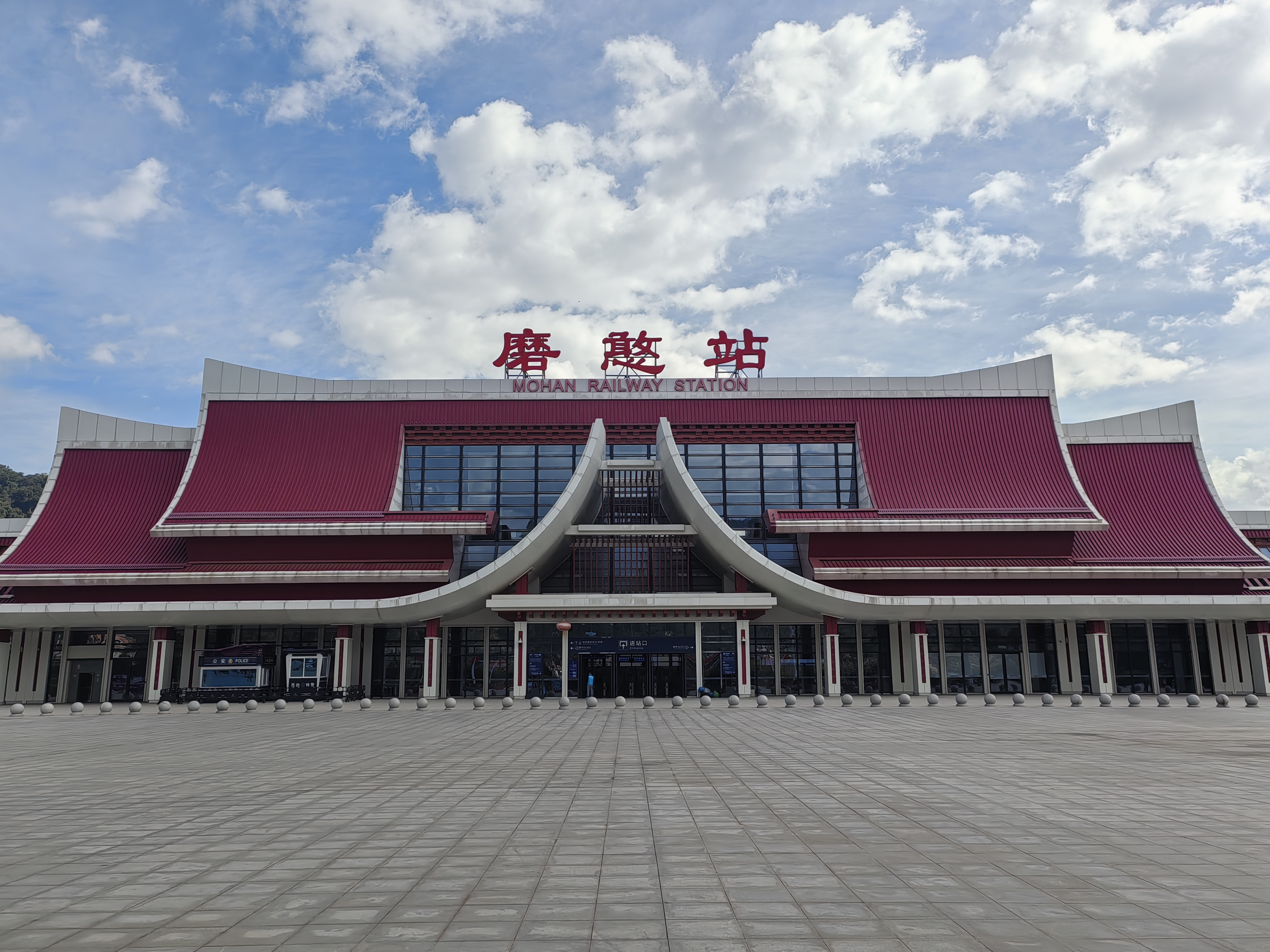
- Exterior of the station in 2025

General information
- Location: Mengla County, Xishuangbanna Dai Autonomous Prefecture, Yunnan; China
- Coordinates: 21°15′13.63″N 101°43′6.92″E
- Operated by: CR Kunming
- Lines: Yuxi–Mohan railway; Boten–Vientiane railway

History
- Opened: 3 December 2021
Location

Mohan railway station (Chinese: 磨憨站) is a railway station in Mengla County, Xishuangbanna Dai Autonomous Prefecture, Yunnan, China. Opened on 3 December 2021, it is the southern terminus of the Yuxi–Mohan railway. The line continues south as the Boten–Vientiane railway.

The station has facilities for handling customs for international passenger and freight trains.

Preceding station	China Railway	Following station
Mengla towards Yuxi	Yuxi–Mohan railway	through to Boten–Vientiane railway
