= Yiwu (disambiguation) =

Yiwu is a city in Zhejiang province, China.

Yiwu may also refer to:

- Yiwu County, county in Xinjiang, China
- Yiwu, Mengla County, town in Mengla County, Yunnan, China
- Prince Yiwu (died 637 BC), Duke Hui of Jin, during the Spring and Autumn period of China's Zhou dynasty
- Guan Yiwu (c. 720 BC – 645 BC), or Guan Zhong, Chinese chancellor of the State of Qi during the Spring and Autumn period
