= Chiang Hung =

Shan state under Burma and China, 1180–1950

Chiang Hung Moeng Lü, Sipsongpanna ᦵᦋᧂᦣᦳᧂᧈ (Tai Lü) 景隴金殿國 (Chinese)
- 1180–1950
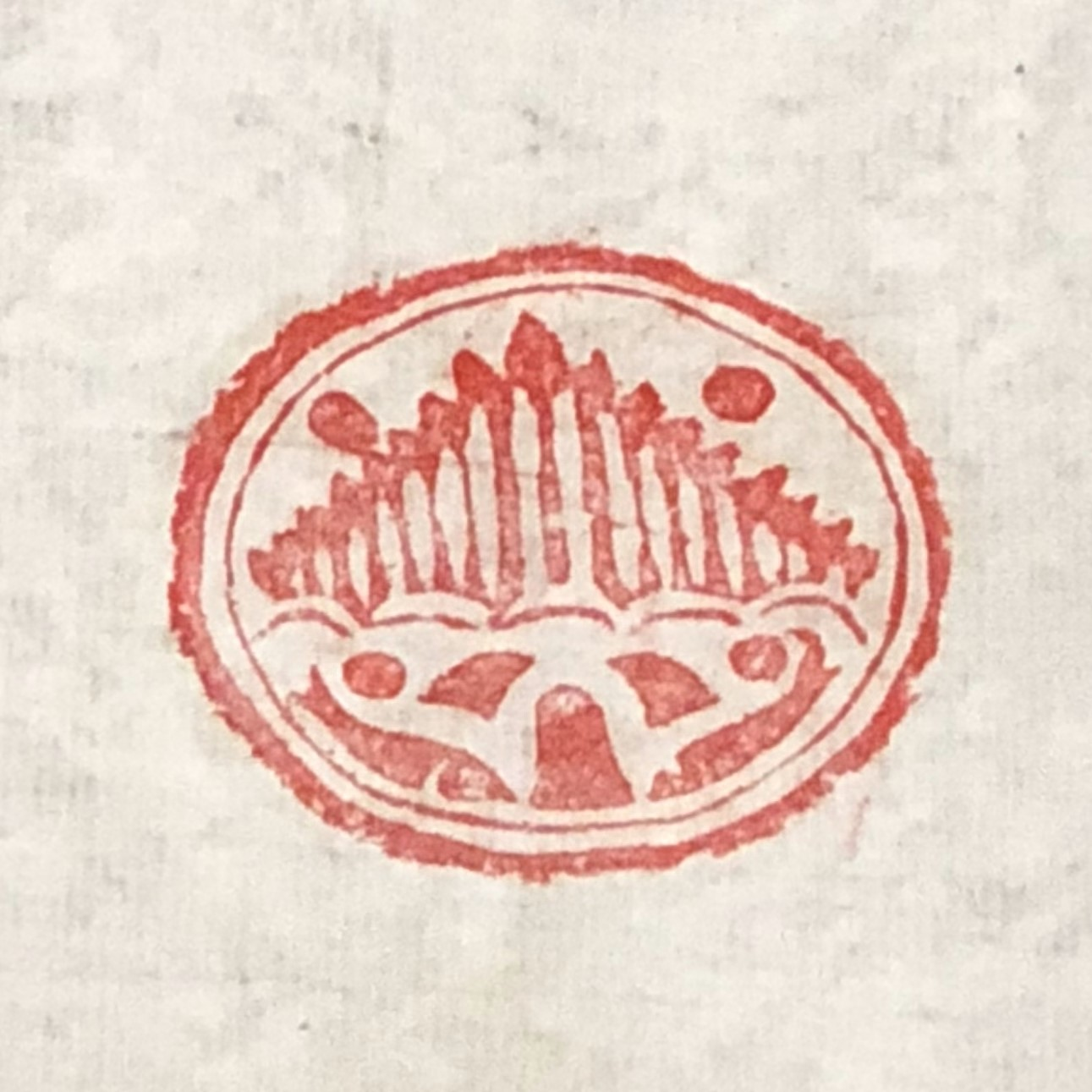
- Seal

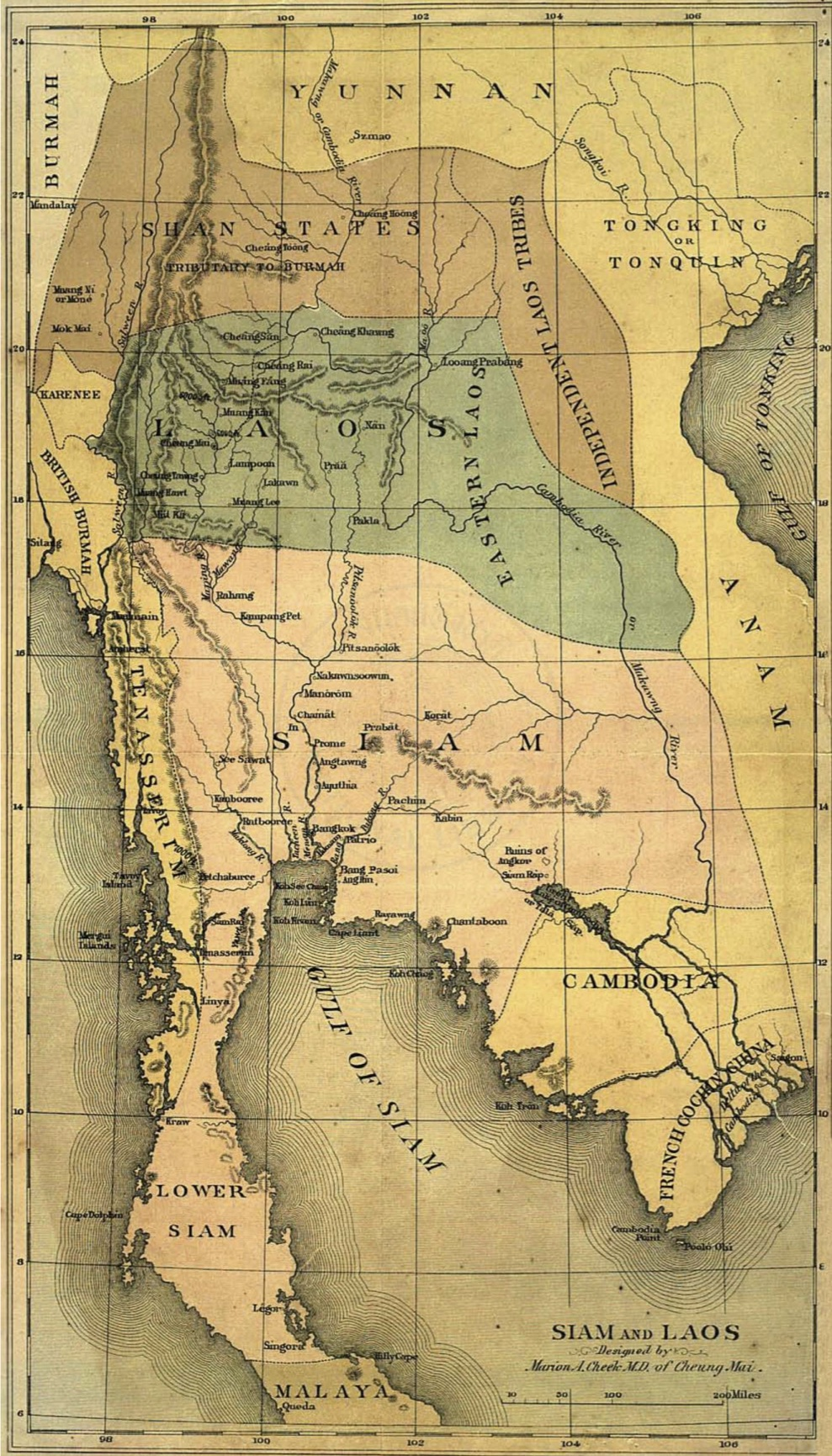
- Chiang Hung (Chiang Hoong) on a 19th-century map including the Chinese Shan States
- Status: Shan state under the suzerainty of Burma, Siam and China (1290–1892); Native Chiefdom of China (1892–1950)
- Capital: Chiang Lan (1190–1458); Chiang Hung (1458–1950)
- History
  - Chiang Hung state established: 1180
  - Annexed by China: 1950
- Today part of: China

Chiang Hung (Note: Also commonly spelled Chiang Rung or Keng Hung. Tai Lü: ᦵᦋᧂᦣᦳᧂᧈ, Chiang Hung; Thai: เมืองหอคำเชียงรุ่ง, Mueang Ho Kham Chiang Rung; Chinese: 車里 or 江洪), also called Moeng Lü or Sipsong Panna, was a Tai Lü kingdom located in present-day Xishuangbanna, China. Its capital was the city of Chiang Hung, modern Jinghong. The kingdom, in its most powerful state in the 13th century, covered a large area before being subjugated by neighboring powers such as the Yuan dynasty, the Lan Na kingdom, and the Konbaung dynasty. Chinese dynasties recognized the local leaders as tusi of Cheli (Chinese: 車里宣慰使).

== History ==
The history of the state can be divided in two periods:

- Early Period 1180 - 1290
  - Chao Phaya Chueang (Pa Zhen) 1180 - 1192
  - Khai Loeung (Ka Leng) 1192 - 12..
  - Thao Ai p. 1290
- Later Period (State under Chinese suzerainty until annexation) 1312 - 1805

=== Early history ===
Phanya Coeng, Paya Jueang (Thai: พญาเจื่อง) or Chao Jueang Han (Thai: เจ้าเจื่องหาญ) was said to wage wars with the native Akha and other Tai peoples in the area and established the kingdom in favor of Tai Lü people at Chiang Hung or Heo Kam on the Mekong in 1180. In the early 13th century, King Inmueng greatly expanded Heokam territories. The tributaries of Heokam kingdom includes Kengtung (Meuang Khün), Chiang Saen (Ngoenyang), Meuang Thaeng (modern Dien Bien Phu – the capital of Tai Dam people), and Xieng Thong (Luang Prabang), making Heokam the sole leader of Tai kingdoms in the north. The Tai Lü people then began scattering throughout Heokam's area of influence.

However, Heokam then fell to the Mongol invasions in 1290 and became a tributary of Yuan dynasty. After a rebellion and subsequent capture of the city by King Mangrai, the Mongols made a peace agreement and the city remained under Mangrai's rule. The Mongols granted the title Chao Saenwi Fa (Thai: เจ้าแสนหวีฟ้า) and the surname of Dao to the Kings of Chiang Hung. The power vacuum in the area was filled by newly formed Lanna kingdom evolving from Ngoenyang state. Mangrai the Great of Lanna put Chiang Hung under Lanna tributary. However, Lanna authority weakened in the early 16th century and Heokam enjoyed a brief period of autonomy until Lanna was conquered by Burmese Toungoo dynasty in 1558. The Burmese under Bayinnaung had already put the area under its control and Chiang Hung became a Burmese tributary. The Burmese divided Heokam into twelve pans (administration units), translated by the Tai Lü people Sipsong Panna (i.e. Twelve districts). Sipsong Panna served as the battlegrounds between Burma and the Qing dynasty.

Heokam faced three centuries of Burmese rule. In efforts to recover the manpower taken by Burma, Buddha Yodfa Chulalok ordered Prince Adthavorapaño of Nan to invade Kengtung and Chiang Hung to gather the Tai peoples there into Nan and other Lanna cities. Today, Nan hosts the largest Tai Lue community in Thailand. Also King Kawila of Chiang Mai invaded Chiang Hung to get the people. The Tai Lue people and culture therefore surged into Lanna.

=== Dynastic struggle ===
A dynastic struggle in 1847 brought chaos to Chiang Hung. According to Siamese chronicles King Mahawan of Chiang Hung died in 1847, to be succeeded by his son Prince Sarawan. However, Mahawan's uncle Prince Mahakhanan took the throne. Prince Sarawan fled to Dali in dismay and sought supports from Qing dynasty. Sarawan returned and killed Mahakhanan, Mahakhanan's son, Prince Nokam, went to Ava to gain supports from Pagan Min. The Burmese invaded and took Chiang Hung - culminating a large Tai Lue emigration into Lanna. Prince Nokam was then crowned but was later killed by his own nobles. Ava then re-installed Sarawan as the king.

Sarawan's brother, Oalnawudh, fled to Luang Prabang and proceeded to Bangkok in 1852. The Siamese nobles then saw this as an opportunity to gain control over Shan States and Chiang Hung and planned to take Kengtung on the way to Chiang Hung. The Siamese invaded the north but were unable to penetrate the mountainous highlands. In 1855, another attempt was made to march to Chiang Hung but yet failed.

=== Later history and legacy ===
Chiang Hung then came under the suzerainty of Qing dynasty for about a century. After the Chinese Empire was overthrown, the kingdom status of Chiang Hung technically ended. However, Republic of China continued to recognize local leaders as tusi. The last chieftain of Jinghong, Dao Shixun, attended the foundation ceremony of the People's Republic of China in 1949, and later became president of the Yunnan Minzu Institute. Xishuangbanna Dai Autonomous Region was established in 1953 and became an autonomous prefecture in 1955. A former tusi of Mengpeng, Shao Cunxin, was the head of Xishuangbanna government from 1953 to 1992.

Following constant warfare in the late 18th century, a large number of Tai Lue people were displaced. Nowadays some Tai Lue settlements can be found in the northern provinces of Thailand and Laos.

Some members of the ruling family, such as Dao Shixun's brother, fled to Mae Sai district in Chiang Rai, Thailand in 1949. Dao Shixun visited them in 1986.

== Rulers ==
The rulers of Chiang Hung bore the title Cao Phaendin.

Cao Phaendin of Moeng Lü
Name in Tai Lü	Name in Chinese	Reign according to Li Fuyi (1947)	Reign according to Gao Lishi (1984)
Phaya Coeng	Ba Zhen	1180–1192	1159–1180
Tao Sam Khai Noeng	Tao Kangleng	1192–1211	1180–1201
Tao Pung or Ai Pung	Tao Beng	1211–1234	1201–1206
Tao Hung (Rung) Kaen Cai	Tao Long Jian Zai	1234–1257	1206–1227
Tao Haeng (Raeng) Luang	Dao Lianglong	1257–1273	1228–1254
Tao Puwak	Dao Buwa	1273–1287	1255–1269
Cao Yi Peng Lak Sai	Yi Bing La Sai	–	1270–1271
Cao Ai	Dao Ai	1287–1347	1271–1311
Cao Kham Moeng	Dao Kan	1347–1391	1312–1350
Tao (Cao) Sida Kham	Dao Xianda	1391–1413	1350–1430
Tao Kumman	Dao Gongman	–	1430–1432
Tao Kü Moeng	Dao Gengmeng	1413–1415	1433–1436
Tao Sòng Moeng	Dao Shuangmeng	2 ½ months	Between 1436 and 1439
Tao Bakòng	Dao Bagong	–	1439–1441
Tao Kham Tet (Tiat) or Tao Kham Daeng	Dao Dian or Dao Khangliang	1417–1428	1442–1445
Soe Long Fa (Süa Luang Fa)	She Longfa	1428–1457	1446–1466
Tao Phasaeng	Dao Baxian	2 months in 1457	5 months in 1466
Tao Sam Pò Lütai	San Bao Lidai	1457–1497	1467–1490
Tao Sam Khai Noeng	San Kaileng	1497–1502	1491–1495
Cao Khan Moeng	Zhao Kan	1502–1523	1496–1518
Cao Sili (Sali) Somphan	Zhao Sili Songban	1523–1530	1518–1539
Cao Un (Ong) Moeng	Dao Nuomeng	1530–1568	1539–1567
Cao Sali Sunanta	Zhao Sili Sunanda	6 months in 1568	6 months in 1568
Cao In Moeng	Dao Yingmeng	1569–1598	1569–1578
Cao Ong (Nò) Moeng	Dao Yunmeng	1598–1628	1584–1602
Cao Sili (Sali) Suthamma	Zhao Shili Sutanma	1628–1639	1603–1620
Cao Mòm Kham Lü	Zhao Kangle	1639–1669	1621–1634
Cao Mòm Tao	Dao Mudao	–	1634–1641
Cao Nò Moeng	Dao Nuomeng	1669–1681	1642–1655
Cao Moeng Tao	Dao Mengtao	1681–1684	1655–1668/1669
Cao Paeng Moeng	Dao Bianmeng	1684–1724	1670–1697/1698
Tao Cin Pao	Dao Jinbao	1724–1729	1698–1707
Tao Sao Wün	Dao Shaowen	1729–1767	1707–1730
Tao Wui Phin	Dao Weiping	1767–1777	1730–1745
Tao Cao (Mòm) Suwan	Dao Shiwan	1777–1796	1746–1763
Tao Thai Khò or Cao Mahawong	Dao Taihe	1797–1802	1764–1770
Tao Yung Khò (Cao Fa Can)	Dao Yonghe	–	1770–1779
Tao Sunwu (Cao Maha Nòi)	Dao Shengwu	1802–1833	–
Tao Thai Khang (Cao Mòm Mahawang)	Dao Taikang	–	1780–1785 (as regent) 1786–1809
Tao Coen Cong (Cao Mòm Suca Wanna)	Dao Zhengzong	1834–1864	1788–1818
Tao Cin An (Cao Mòm Sò or Cao Mòm Khung Kham)	Dao Jun'an	–	1863–1879
Cao Mòm Saeng (Tao Sin Fu)	Dao Taikang or Dao Bingfu	–	1880–1883
Tao Soen An (Cao Mòm Kham Lü)	Dao Cheng'en	–	1884–1924
Tao Tung Laeng (Cao Mòm Suwanna Pha Khang)	Dao Dongliang	–	1927–1943
Tao Sü Sin (Cao Mòm Kham Lü)	Dao Shixun	–	1947–1950

== See also ==
- Shan States
- Tai peoples
- Köng-ma, one of the largest Chinese Shan States

== Bibliography ==
- Fred. W. Carey. A Trip to the Chinese Shan States The Geographical Journal Vol. 14, No. 4 (Oct., 1899), pp. 378-394
- Henry Rodolph Davies. Yün-nan: The Link Between India and the Yangtze, Cambridge University Press, 2010 ISBN 9781108010795
- Charles Patterson Giersch, Asian Borderlands: The Transformation of Qing China's Yunnan Frontier, Harvard University Press, 2006 ISBN 9780674021716
- Liew-Herres, Foon Ming; Grabowsky, Volker; Wichāsin, Rēnū (2012). Chronicle of Sipsòng Panna: History and Society of a Tai Lü Kingdom, Twelfth to Twentieth Century. Mekong Press. ISBN 978-616-90053-3-9.
