= Yuxi–Mohan railway =

Higher-speed railway line in Yunnan, China

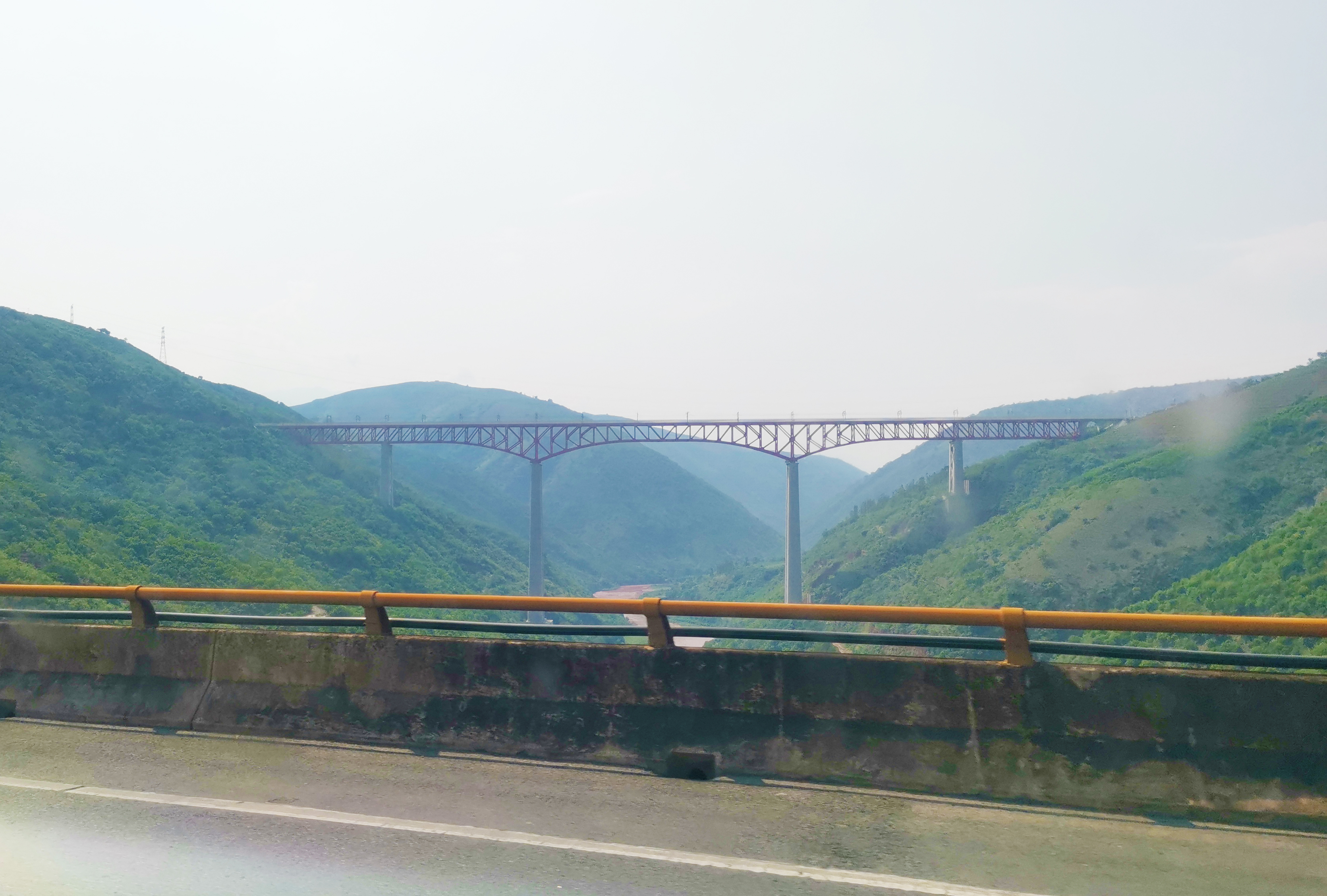
- Yuanjiang Railway Bridge

Overview
- Other name: Yumo railway
- Native name: 玉磨铁路
- Owner: China Railway
- Locale: Yunnan
- Termini: Yuxi; Mohan
- Stations: 28

Service
- Type: Higher-speed rail; Inter-city rail; Freight rail
- System: Lao–China railway
- Operator(s): China Railway Kunming Group
- Rolling stock: CR200J, HXD3C
- Daily ridership: 19,000–33,000

History
- Commenced: 1 September 2015
- Opened: 3 December 2021

Technical
- Line length: 507 km (315 mi)
- Number of tracks: 2 (north of Xishuangbanna); 1 (south of Xishuangbanna)
- Character: Elevated
- Track gauge: 1,435 mm (4 ft 8 1/2 in) standard gauge
- Electrification: 25 kV 50 Hz AC overhead line
- Operating speed: 160 kilometres per hour (99 mph) (passengers); 120 kilometres per hour (75 mph) (cargo)

The Yuxi–Mohan railway or Yumo railway (Chinese: 玉磨铁路; pinyin: Yùmó tiělù), is a Chinese section of the Lao–China Railway (LCR) in Yunnan Province of southwest China. The line runs 503.9 km (313 mi) from Yuxi in central Yunnan to Mohan, a town in Mengla County on the border with Laos in the Xishuangbanna Dai Autonomous Prefecture of southern Yunnan. The Yumo railway is designed to "provide efficient, safe, low-carbon, affordable, railway transport" within Yunnan Province.

Branching from the existing Kunming–Yuxi–Hekou railway at Yuxi and connecting directly to the Boten–Vientiane railway on the Laotian side, the Yumo railway is a part of the Kunming–Singapore railway and will eventually carry traffic across the Greater Mekong Subregion.

Early stage construction began on September 1, 2015. The project is estimated to cost ¥46.46 billion. The railway is electrified, and has double-track from Yuxi to Jinghong and single-track from Jinghong to Mohan. Cities and towns along route include Yuxi, Pu'er, Jinghong and Mohan.

The railway opened on December 3, 2021.

== History ==
After China and 17 other Asian countries signed the Trans-Asian Railway Network Agreement in June 2006, the Yuxi–Mohan railway was proposed as a component of the Kunming–Singapore railway Central Route, which would connect Kunming, Vientiane, Bangkok, Kuala Lumpur and Singapore.

In September 2010, state media in Yunnan reported that the Ministry of Railways had held a planning conference for the Yuxi–Mohan railway in August and that construction of the double track electrified line, 487.7 km (303 mi) in length and capable of accommodating trains traveling at speeds of up to 200 km/h (124 mph), would begin by the end of 2010. The line was reported to cost ¥53.9 billion and take five years to build. Overland travel time from Kunming to Jinghong would be reduced from 9 hours to 2.5 hours.

On December 30, 2010, Chinese state media reported that early preparatory work for the Yumo railway had been completed, but the final construction plan had not been publicized. Construction began on a railway logistics center in Mohan. The railway project was delayed, however, after the removal of railway Minister Liu Zhijun for corruption in February 2011 and the subsequent reorganization of the Railway Ministry into the China Railway Corporation in March 2013.

A preliminary feasibility conference for the project was organized in Beijing on November 30, 2013 by the China Railway Corporation at which railway planners and Yunnan officials expressed their desire to see the project proceed quickly.

== Construction ==
Construction on two early-stage segments began on September 1, 2015 with the full-scale construction on the line on 19 April 2016. According to Xinhua News Agency in Yuxi, the line is scheduled to be 507.4 km long, costing 51,609 million yuan, reach maximum speeds of 160 km/h, taking 6 years to complete construction. It is scheduled to open in December 2021.

Running times are scheduled to be 1.5 hours from Kunming to Eshan, to be within 3 hours from Kunming to Pu'er, to be about 3 hours from Kunming to Jinghong, and 5 hours from Kunming to Mohan.

The construction is divided into 22 segments. The 6820-meter Yueyatian Tunnel (月牙田隧道) is done on 30 December 2019.

== Stations ==
There are 13 stations, including:

- Yuxi (玉溪站)
- Yanhe (研和站)
- Eshan (峨山站)
- Luoli (罗里站)
- Yuanjiang (元江站)
- Mojiang (墨江站)
- Ning'er (宁洱站)
- Pu'er (普洱站)
- Mengyang (勐养站)
- Xishuangbanna (西双版纳站) at Jinghong City - End of electrified double track section
- Ganlanba (橄榄坝站)
- Mengla (勐腊站)
- Mohan (磨憨站)

Five more stations will be included later, including:

- Feilong (飞龙)
- Suoluohe (梭罗河)
- Mengyuan (勐远)
- Manle (曼勒)
- Puwen (普文)

== Rail connections ==
- Yuxi: Kunming–Yuxi–Hekou railway
- Mohan: Boten–Vientiane railway
  - The connection to Boten (Laos) is through the 9.59 kilometres (31,500 ft) long China-Laos Railway Friendship Tunnel
