= Port of Jinghong =

River port in China

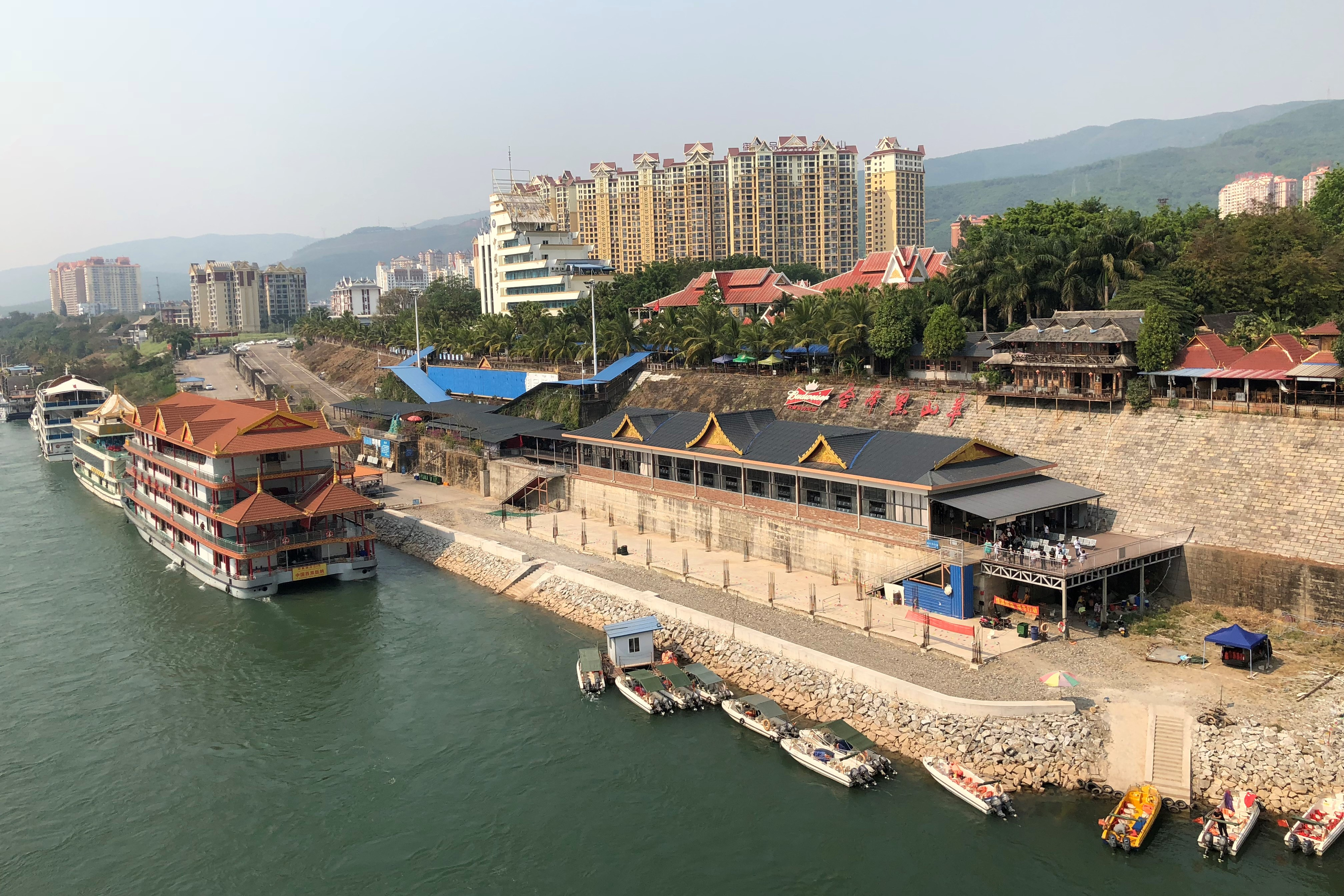
- Interactive map of Port of Jinghong
- Location in China Yunnan
- Native name: 景洪港水运（河港）口岸

Location
- Country: China
- Location: Jinghong, Yunnan
- Coordinates: 22.015895°N 100.805284°E
- UN/LOCODE: CN JOG

Details
- Opened: 1993; 33 years ago
- Type of harbour: Class I Water Port of Entry

The Port of Jinghong is an inland port on the Lancang—Mekong River) in China. It is located in Jinghong city, Xishuangbanna, Yunnan province, close to the border to the triple border with Myanmar and Laos. The port is a Type I Port of Entry and it is now the largest Chinese port in the Mekong waterway. In 2014, it had 4,750 ships docking, 167,000 tonnes of cargo, 71,000 passengers, and US$278 million of activity.

== Layout ==
There are three port areas under the port's jurisdiction, extending over 81 km downriver from Jinhong city, namely:

- Jinghong Central Wharf (洪港中心码头), which covers an area of 9.8ha 147 mu, and has a design capacity of 400,000 tons and 1.5 million people per year. It has 6 berths in total (2 passenger berths, 4 cargo berths).
- Ganlanba Wharf (橄榄坝码头). It has a passenger berth for 150DWT passenger ships (capacity of 80–100 pax), 110 meters long. 4 freight berths of 300DWT, 320 m of shoreline. It is intended to process containers in the future.
- Guanlei Wharf (关累港), right at the border with Myanmar, focuses on cargo, it has three berths with an annual capacity of 200,000 tonnes and 100,000 passengers.

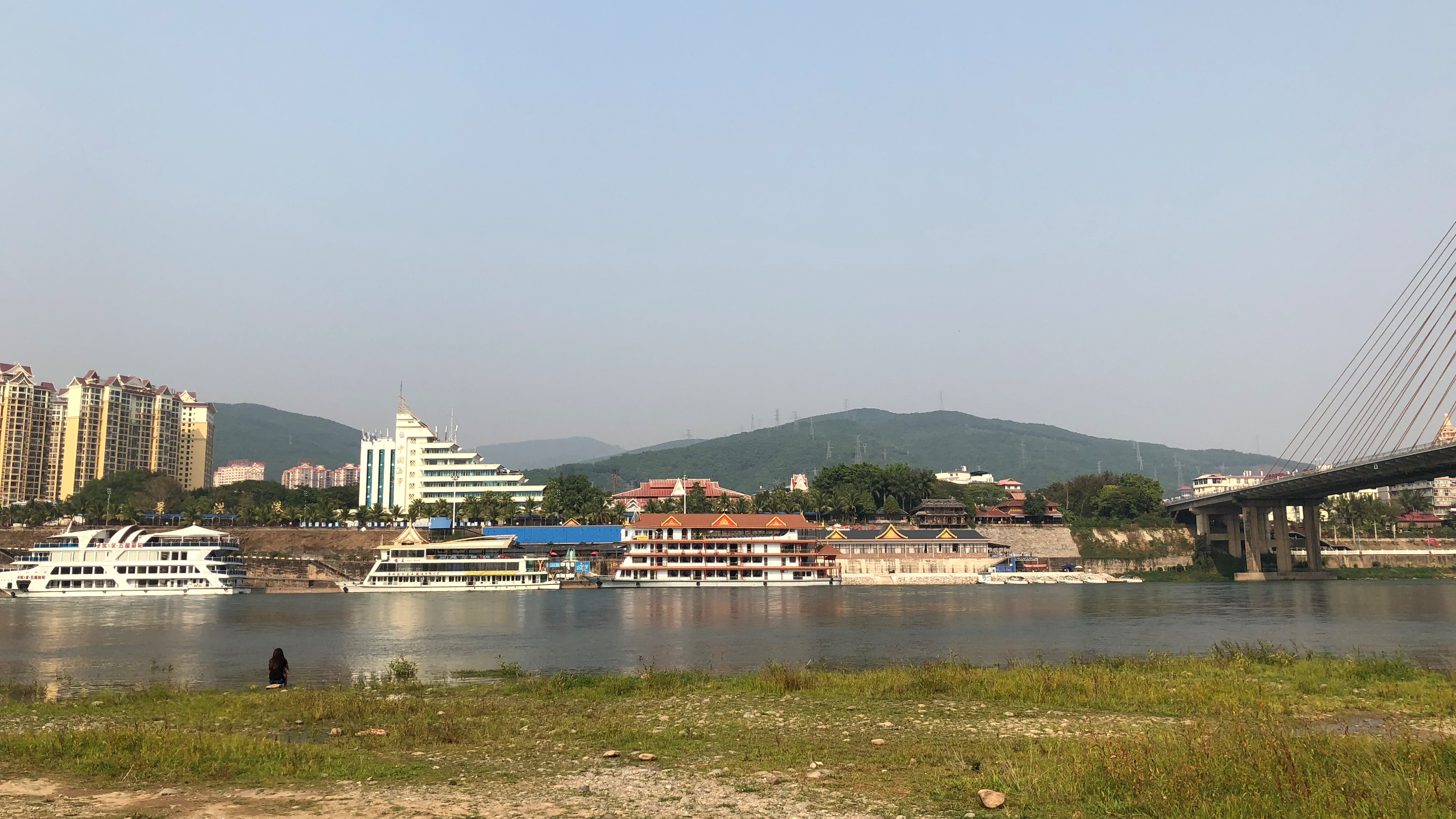
Jinghong Port from right bank

== History ==
The port was designated a national Class I Port of Entry on 24 July 1993 by the State Council.

On 20 April 2000, China, Laos, Myanmar, and Thailand signed the Agreement on Commercial Navigation on Lancang-Mekong River, also known as the "Quadripartite agreement" that opened navigation for 890 km, from Simao to Luang Prabang. On 26 June 2001 the river was opened for commercial navigation.

The three port areas have seen continuous expansion since then, and the navigable channel of the Mekong has been improved by removing obstacles and better aids to navigation, increasing its capacity.

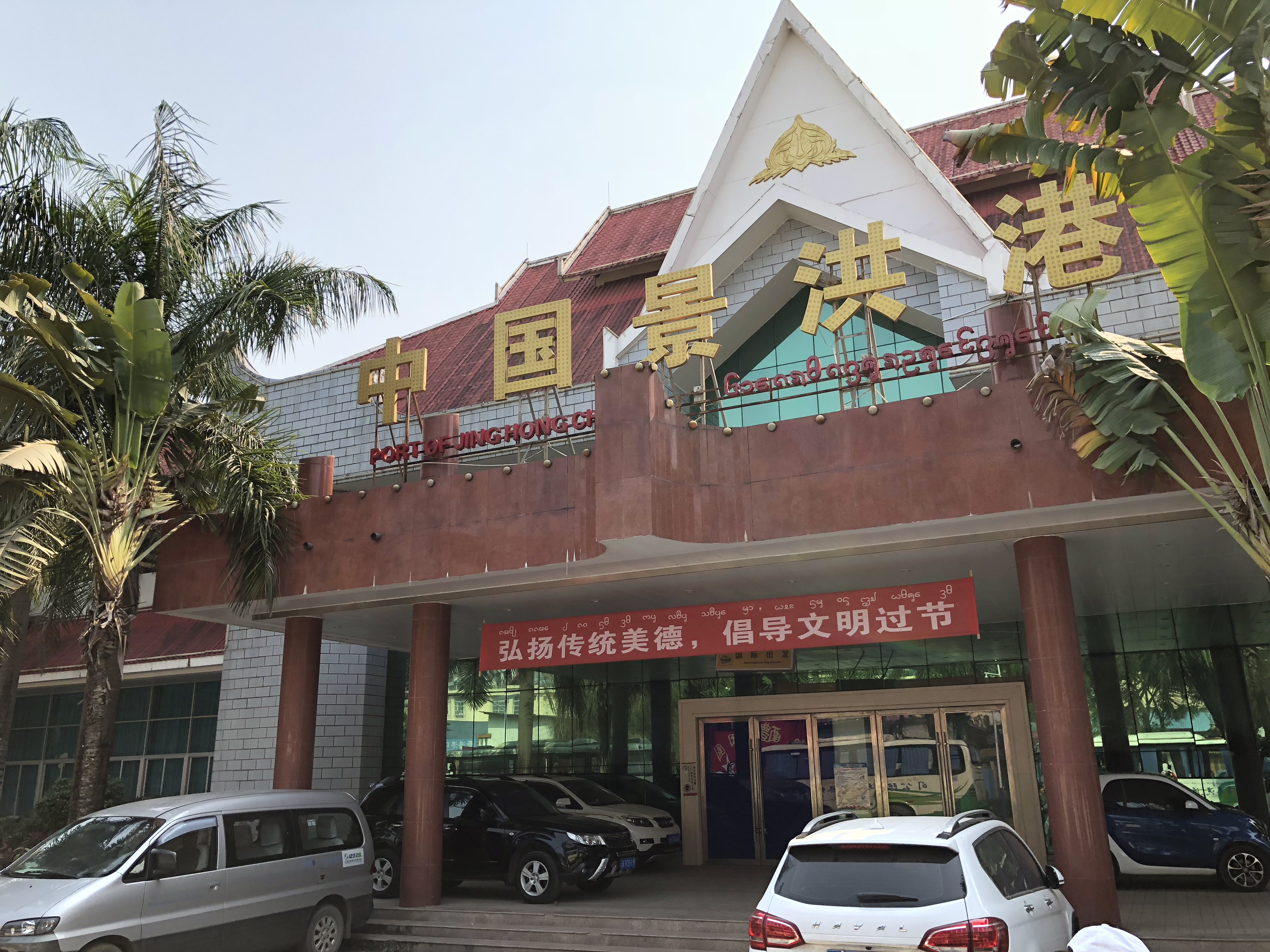
Port of Jinghong passenger building

== Operations ==
The Mekong River flows for 4,880 km through China, Myanmar, Laos, Thailand, Cambodia, and Vietnam, but it is not navigable all the way to the sea due to the Khone Falls in Laos. The navigation conditions are challenging and can be treacherous, and the fairway is not too deep (1.2m to 2m in the dry season). Most of the boats operating the upper Mekong are 50 to 100DWT barges, but 300DWT transports can operate. The main trade route is between the Port of Chiang Saen and China, which takes 9 hours for passenger ships and 30 for cargo vessels.

Overall, about 800,000 tons of cargo are shipped annually between China, Thailand, Myanmar and Laos.

== See also ==
- Ports of Entry of China
