= Gasa, Yunnan =

Gasa 嘎洒镇
- Town
- Location of Gasa in Yunnan
- Coordinates: 21°57′16″N 100°45′39″E
- Country: China
- Province: Yunnan
- Autonomous prefecture: Xishuangbanna Dai Autonomous Prefecture
- County-level city: Jinghong

Area (Not including farms)
  - Total: 730 km^{2} (280 sq mi)

Population
  - Total: 51,535
- Time zone: UTC+8 (China Standard)
- GDP: CNY 964 million
- License plate: 云K

Gasa (Chinese: 嘎洒镇) is a town located in the southwest part of Jinghong, Xishuangbanna Dai Autonomous Prefecture.

== Administrative divisions ==
Gasa has the following villages:

- Manzhanzai Village
- Manda Village
- Manmian Village
- Manbo Village
- Shayao Village
- Nanlianshan Village
- Nanpa Village
- Manjinghan Village
- Manmai Village
- Mandian Village
- Naban Village
- Mangebo Village
- Nasa Village

== Geography ==
To the east of Gasa is the urban area of Jinghong, to the southeast is Menglong Township, to the south is Menglong Township, to the west is Gelanghe Township in Menghai County and Mengsong Township, and to the northeast is Menghan Township.

The town has a total area of 730 sq km, not including farms. The used land area is 465,000 mu (excluding farms), accounting for 42.4% of the total area, and 81% of the is covered by forest.

Rivers in Gasa include Lancang River, Liusha River, Nanxi River, Nanao River, Nanguo River, Mandian River, and Naban River.

== Demographics ==
There are 11,849 households and 51,535 residents of Gasa. The rural population accounts for 77.27% of the total population and foreign residents account for 3.32%. The town is home to ethnic groups such as Dai, Hani, Lahu, Han, and Blang. Dai people accounted for 46.84% of the total population; Hani people accounted for 22.78%, Lahu people accounted for 7.17%, Blang people accounted for 2.17%, and Han people and others accounted for 21.04%. The population growth rate is 1.1%.

The average temperature is 22 °C and the average annual rainfall is 1209 mm. Most of the rain is concentrated in May–September. The annual average sunshine is 1692.7 hours, which is suitable for planting various tropical crops.

== Economy ==
In 2018, the town achieved a GDP of 964 million yuan, an increase of 10.1% over the previous year, and the per capita net income of farmers was 13,482 yuan.

The main industries in Gasa are grain, rubber, vegetables, tea, animal husbandry, and aquaculture.

== Education ==
There are seven elementary schools and one middle school in Gasa.

== Transport ==
Gasa is the location of Xishuangbanna Gasa International Airport. Gasa has a high-speed railway, and China National Highway 214 passes through Gasa.
