= Yan Long (soldier) =

Chinese soldier (1960–1979)

- Native name: 岩龙
- Born: January 1960; Jinghong, Yunnan, China
- Died: 25 February 1979 (aged 19) Lào Cai, Vietnam †
- Buried: Shuitou Martyrs' Cemetery; Hekou, Yunnan, China
- Allegiance: People's Republic of China
- Branch: People's Liberation Army Ground Force
- Service years: 1978–1979
- Conflicts: Sino-Vietnamese War †
- Awards: Meritorious Service Medal, 1st class Title 'Solitary Hero'

Yan Long (Chinese: 岩龙; pinyin: Yán Lóng; January 1960 – 25 February 1979) was a Chinese soldier in the People's Liberation Army. He was posthumously awarded for his actions during the 1979 Sino-Vietnamese War.

== Early life ==
Of Dai ethnicity, Yan was born on 1960 in Jinghong in Xishuangbanna Dai Autonomous Prefecture, Yunnan, China.

== Military career ==
Yan enlisted in the People's Liberation Army in March 1978 and joined the Communist Youth League of China in the same year. He served in Squad Four, Fifth Company, 120th Regiment, 40th Division of the 14th Army. During training and early service, he received four commendations for bravery and was named a model soldier in marksmanship, grenade throwing and physical fitness.

=== Sino-Vietnamese war ===
In 1979, Yan Long took part in the Sino-Vietnamese War. On 21 February 1979, after Chinese forces broke through Vietnamese forward defensive positions, the Fifth Company advanced along Route 7 in an area east of Lào Cai, Vietnam. Near Hill 78, the unit encountered Vietnamese troops equipped with anti-aircraft and machine guns. During the engagement, the platoon leader, Pan Kunhua, was killed, and the other members of Yan Long's group were wounded. After covering the evacuation of the wounded and fallen, he advanced alone into enemy positions, crawling to within 100 meters of Vietnamese fortifications. Over four hours of fighting, he destroyed three enemy fire points, including a heavy machine-gun position, eliminated an artillery site, repelled a surprise attack and killed more than twenty Vietnamese soldiers, resulting in the disruption of Vietnamese firepower and enabled Chinese forces to capture Hill 78.

On the afternoon of 25 February 1979, while advancing toward a Vietnamese stronghold north of Lào Cai, Yan was shot dead by a Vietnamese sniper during a search and pursuit operation. He was buried with military honors at Shuitou Martyrs' Cemetery in Hekou Yao Autonomous County, Yunnan, China.

== Honors ==
In March 1979, the CCP committee of his division posthumously admitted him to the Party and awarded him the Meritorious Service Medal (first class). On 17 September 1979, the Central Military Commission awarded him the honorary title "Solitary Hero". In 1984, he was one of the Chinese models and soldiers featured in a set of 1984 propaganda posters 'Register of Heroes'.
