= Raorchestes menglaensis =

Conservation status
- Least Concern (IUCN 3.1)

Scientific classification
- Kingdom: Animalia
- Phylum: Chordata
- Class: Amphibia
- Order: Anura
- Family: Rhacophoridae
- Genus: Raorchestes
- Species: R. menglaensis

Binomial name
- Raorchestes menglaensis (Kou, 1990)

Synonyms
- Philautus menglaensis Kou, 1990

Species of amphibian

Raorchestes menglaensis (Zhishihe's bubble-nest frog or Mengla small treefrog) is a species of frog in the family Rhacophoridae. Only known from its type locality, Zhishihe in Mengla County, it is endemic to Yunnan, China, although it is expected to occur more widely, including adjacent Laos.

Raorchestes menglaensis are small frogs: males measure only 16 mm (0.63 in) in snout-vent length, whereas females are slightly larger at 20 mm (0.79 in) SVL. It is a very rare species known from fewer than 10 specimens. It inhabits streamside shrubland. It is threatened by habitat loss.

This frog has been observed in forests, forest edges, and open habitats near streams between 600 and 1100 meters above sea level.

This frog is classified as at least concern of extinction because even though its range is of moderate size, it is not subject to continued degradation. Also, the frog has shown some tolerance to alteration of its habitat. The frog occurs in the buffer zone of the Xishuangbanna National Nature Reserve.
