= Jinghong =

Jinghong 景洪市 · เชียงรุ่ง · ຊຽງຮຸ່ງ
- County-level city
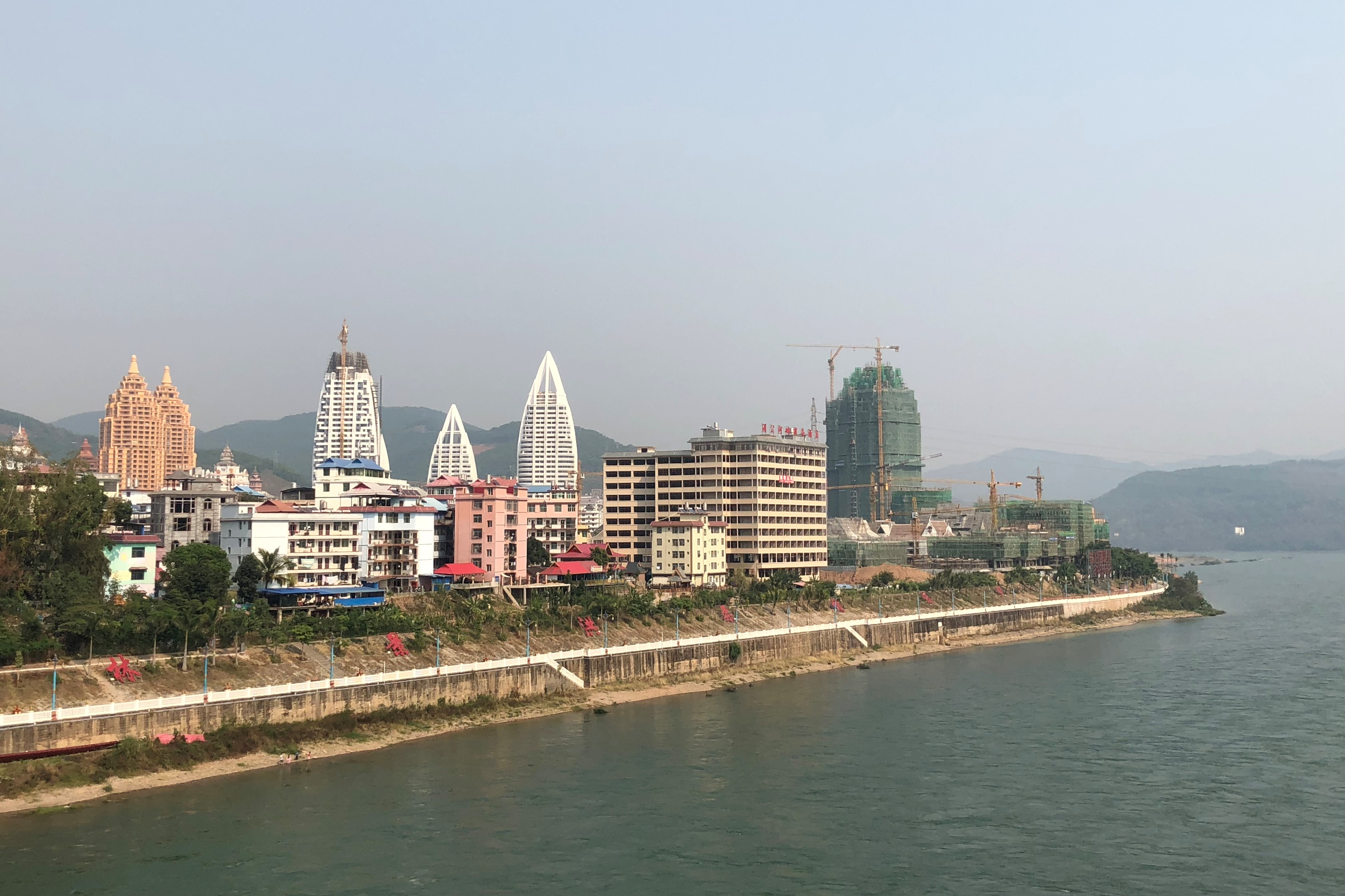
- Lancang River bank in Jinghong

- Location of Jinghong City (red) within Xishuangbanna Prefecture (pink) and Yunnan

- Location of the city centre in Yunnan Jinghong (China)
- Coordinates (Xishuangbanna Prefecture government): 22°00′32″N 100°47′49″E
- Country: China
- Province: Yunnan
- Autonomous prefecture: Xishuangbanna
- GB/T 2260 CODE: 532801
- Municipal seat: Yunjinghong Subdistrict

Area
  - Total: 7,133 km^{2} (2,754 sq mi)
- Elevation: 558 m (1,831 ft)

Population (2020 census)
  - Total: 642,737
  - Density: 90.11/km^{2} (233.4/sq mi)
- Time zone: UTC+8 (China Standard)
- Postal code: 666100
- Area code: 0691
- Climate: Aw
- Website: www.jhs.gov.cn
- ^{1}Yunnan Statistics Bureau^{2}Xishuangbanna Gov.^{3}Yunnan Portal

Jinghong (Chinese: 景洪; pinyin: Jǐnghóng; Tai Lü: ᦵᦋᧂ ᦣᦳᧂᧈ ᦉᦹᧈ; Burmese: ကျိုင်းဟုံ; Thai: เชียงรุ่ง, RTGS: Chiang Rung, pronounced [tɕʰīaŋ rûŋ]; Northern Thai: ᨩ᩠ᨿᨦᩁᩩ᩵ᨦ, pronounced [tɕīaŋ hûŋ]; Lao: ຊຽງຮຸ່ງ, pronounced [síaŋ hūŋ]; also formerly romanised as Chiang Hung, Chengrung, Cheng Hung, Jeng Hung, Jinghung, Keng Hung, Kiang Hung and Muangjinghung) is a city in and the seat of Xishuangbanna Dai Autonomous Prefecture, in the far south of China's Yunnan province, and the historic capital of the former Tai kingdom of Sipsongpanna.

== History ==
The town was founded as Chiang Hung (Cheli), by Tai king Phanya Coeng in 1180.

=== Kingdom of Chiang Hung (Sipsongpanna) ===
During the Mongol Yuan Dynasty in China, the Tai kingdom of Sipsongpanna began a close and long-lasting relationship to Lanna, another historic Tai kingdom that lay south. In 1296, Lanna's capital Chiang Mai was founded by Mangrai, whose maternal grandfather was King Rung Kaen Chai (Thai: รุ่งแก่นชาย) of Jinghong (i.e.: Sipsongpanna).

The kingdoms of Sipsongpanna and Lanna maintained ties through migration and intermarriage.

In 1401, the Sipsongpanna Tai ruler Tau Se Da Xam (pinyin: Dao Xianda) attacked a smaller Tai area to the north unknown as Weiyuan, equivalent to modern Jinggu. The Ming administration sought to retaliate but adopted a cautious response of diplomacy and Tau Se Da Xam withdrew his troops. About this period Sipsongpanna began to pay tribute to the Ming.

In 1405 the Sipsongpanna Tai attacked Chiang Mai, in conjunction with Ming Chinese troops.

In 1421 the Chinese attempted to cause a split in Sipsongpanna by backing multiple administrations during a period of civil strife, but their plan failed to succeed.

1448 saw the defeat of Mong Mao, a Tai state in eastern Burma, by a combination of Chinese, Sipsongpanna and allied forces united under the Ming.

In the 1450s another struggle for succession arose in Sipsongpanna, with one faction backed by Kengtung and one by Chiang Mai. Despite the Kengtung faction's victory, conflict started with that state shortly afterwards.

The Burmese Toungoo state arose in the 1530s to crush Chiang Mai, and its influence also extended to Kengtung and Sipsongpanna, which like other Tai kingdoms soon began to pay tribute.

== Geography and climate ==
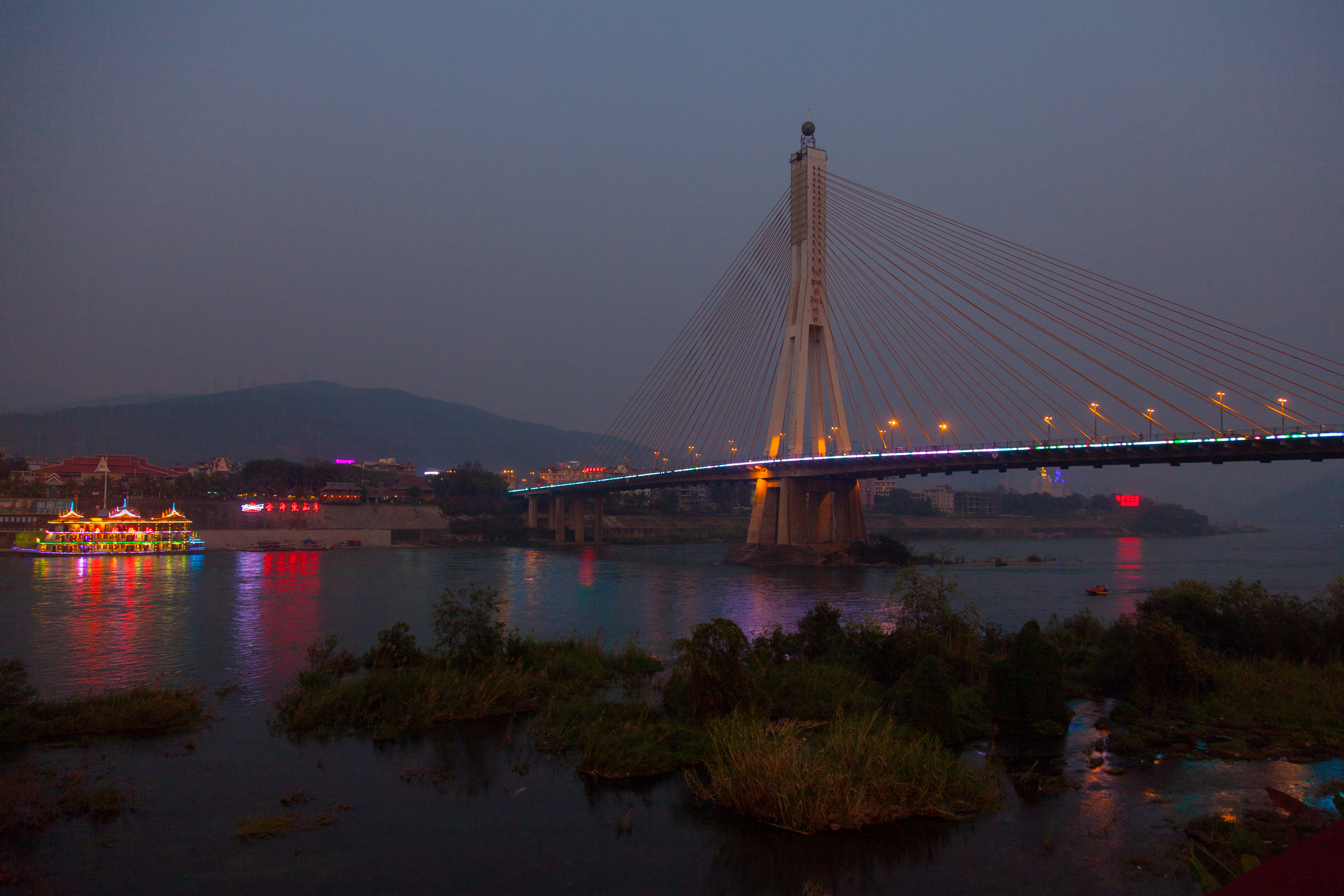
Lancang (Mekong) river in the evening with Port of Jinghong (left) and the new Xishuangbanna Bridge (right)

Jinghong has a latitude range of 21°27'–22°36' N and a longitude range of 100°25'–101°31' E. It borders Simao District of Pu'er City to the north, Mengla County and Jiangcheng County to the east, and Menghai County to the west, as well as Burma's Shan State to the south. The city is limited to the south by Hengduan Mountains, and the Lancang River (Mekong) passes through Jinghong. Two bridges near the city span this river, which flows south-east towards Laos.

Climatically, Jinghong has a humid subtropical climate (Köppen Cwa) bordering on the tropical wet and dry climate (Köppen Aw). The city has a generally humid climate with strong monsoonal influences. Summer is long and there is virtually no "winter" as such; instead, there is a dry season (December thru April) and wet season (May thru October). Annual sunshine hours amount to between 1800 and 2300 and annual rainfall ranging from 1,100 to 1,700 millimetres (43 to 67 in). The coolest month are December and January, averaging 17.5 °C (63.5 °F), while the warmest is June, at 26.6 °C (79.9 °F); the annual mean is 22.9 °C (73.2 °F). However, high temperatures reach their peak in April before the onset of the monsoon from the Indian Ocean.

Climate data for Jinghong, elevation 582 m (1,909 ft), (1991–2020 normals, extremes 1971–present)
Month	Jan	Feb	Mar	Apr	May	Jun	Jul	Aug	Sep	Oct	Nov	Dec	Year
Record high °C (°F)	32.2 (90.0)	35.7 (96.3)	40.2 (104.4)	41.1 (106.0)	41.3 (106.3)	39.0 (102.2)	37.4 (99.3)	36.7 (98.1)	36.2 (97.2)	34.6 (94.3)	34.4 (93.9)	31.4 (88.5)	41.3 (106.3)
Mean daily maximum °C (°F)	26.3 (79.3)	29.5 (85.1)	31.9 (89.4)	33.4 (92.1)	33.0 (91.4)	32.2 (90.0)	31.1 (88.0)	31.4 (88.5)	31.4 (88.5)	29.7 (85.5)	27.5 (81.5)	25.0 (77.0)	30.2 (86.4)
Daily mean °C (°F)	17.5 (63.5)	19.6 (67.3)	22.1 (71.8)	24.7 (76.5)	26.0 (78.8)	26.6 (79.9)	26.0 (78.8)	25.9 (78.6)	25.3 (77.5)	23.5 (74.3)	20.3 (68.5)	17.5 (63.5)	22.9 (73.3)
Mean daily minimum °C (°F)	12.3 (54.1)	12.7 (54.9)	15.2 (59.4)	18.6 (65.5)	21.4 (70.5)	23.2 (73.8)	23.1 (73.6)	22.9 (73.2)	22.1 (71.8)	20.3 (68.5)	16.6 (61.9)	13.6 (56.5)	18.5 (65.3)
Record low °C (°F)	2.7 (36.9)	6.6 (43.9)	6.2 (43.2)	11.9 (53.4)	15.0 (59.0)	15.9 (60.6)	18.9 (66.0)	19.3 (66.7)	15.8 (60.4)	12.0 (53.6)	7.2 (45.0)	1.9 (35.4)	1.9 (35.4)
Average precipitation mm (inches)	20.3 (0.80)	9.5 (0.37)	28.4 (1.12)	56.3 (2.22)	130.6 (5.14)	138.0 (5.43)	232.4 (9.15)	217.4 (8.56)	138.9 (5.47)	104.4 (4.11)	41.1 (1.62)	22.9 (0.90)	1,140.2 (44.89)
Average precipitation days (≥ 0.1 mm)	2.9	2.6	4.6	9.7	16.2	19.1	22.7	21.4	15.4	11.8	5.5	3.7	135.6
Average relative humidity (%)	77	66	65	68	74	79	83	83	83	84	83	82	77
Mean monthly sunshine hours	212.5	230.5	229.9	228.3	206.0	155.5	125.0	149.7	173.3	166.9	181.5	175.9	2,235
Percentage possible sunshine	63	71	62	60	50	39	30	38	47	47	55	53	51
Source 1: China Meteorological Administrationall-time November record high
Source 2: Weather China

== Administrative divisions ==
Jinghong City has 1 subdistrict, 5 towns, 3 townships and 2 ethnic townships.

1 subdistrict

- Yunjinghong Subdistrict (允景洪街道)

5 towns

- Gasa (嘎洒街道, 前嘎洒镇)
- Menglong (勐龙镇)
- Menghan (勐罕镇)
- Mengyang (勐养镇)
- Puwen (普文镇)

3 townships

- Jingne (景讷乡)
- Dadugang (大渡岗乡)
- Mengwang (勐旺乡)

2 ethnic townships

- Jingha Hani (景哈哈尼族)
- Jinuoshan Jinuo (基诺山基诺族乡)

== Transport ==
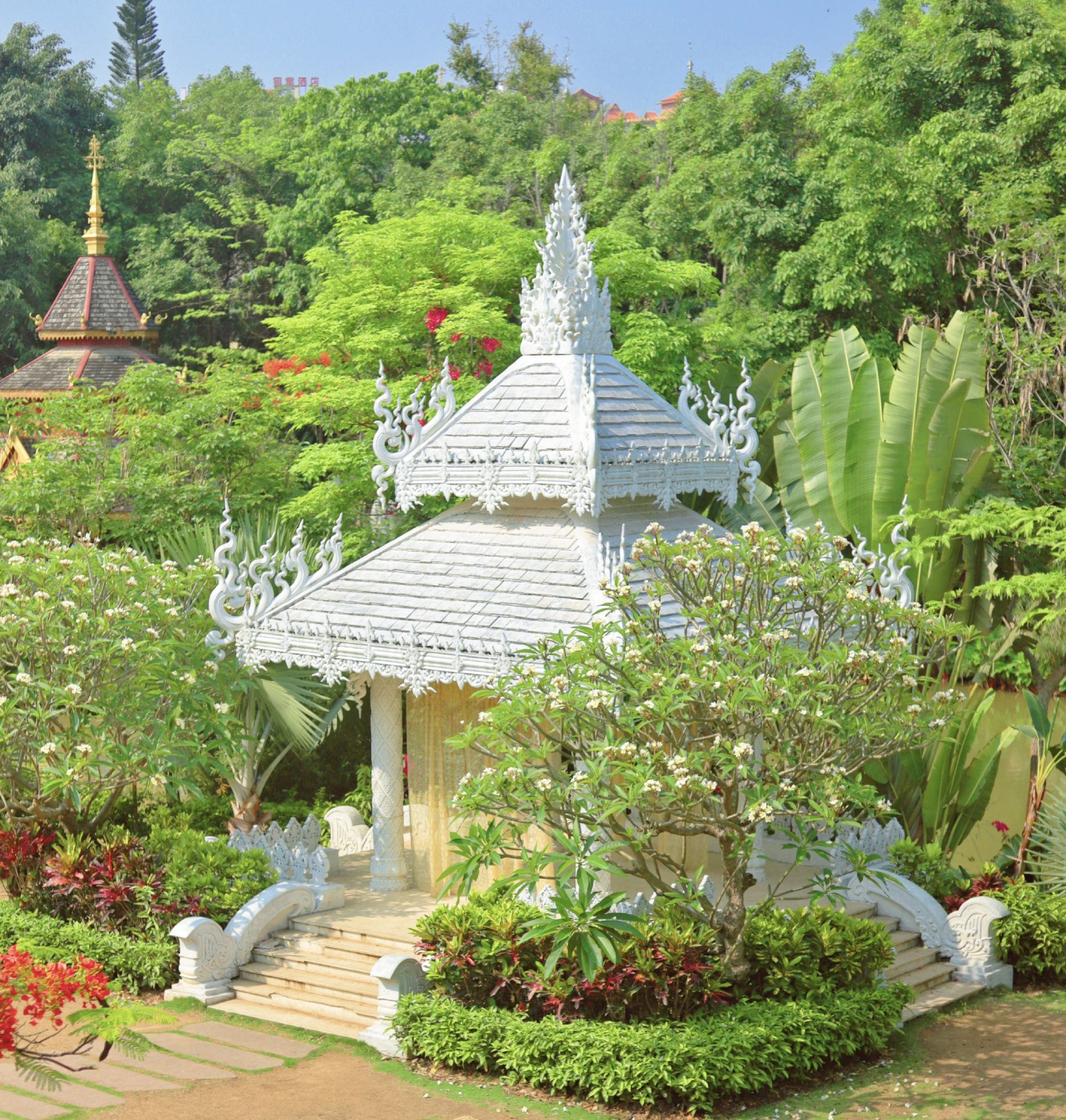
Manting Garden

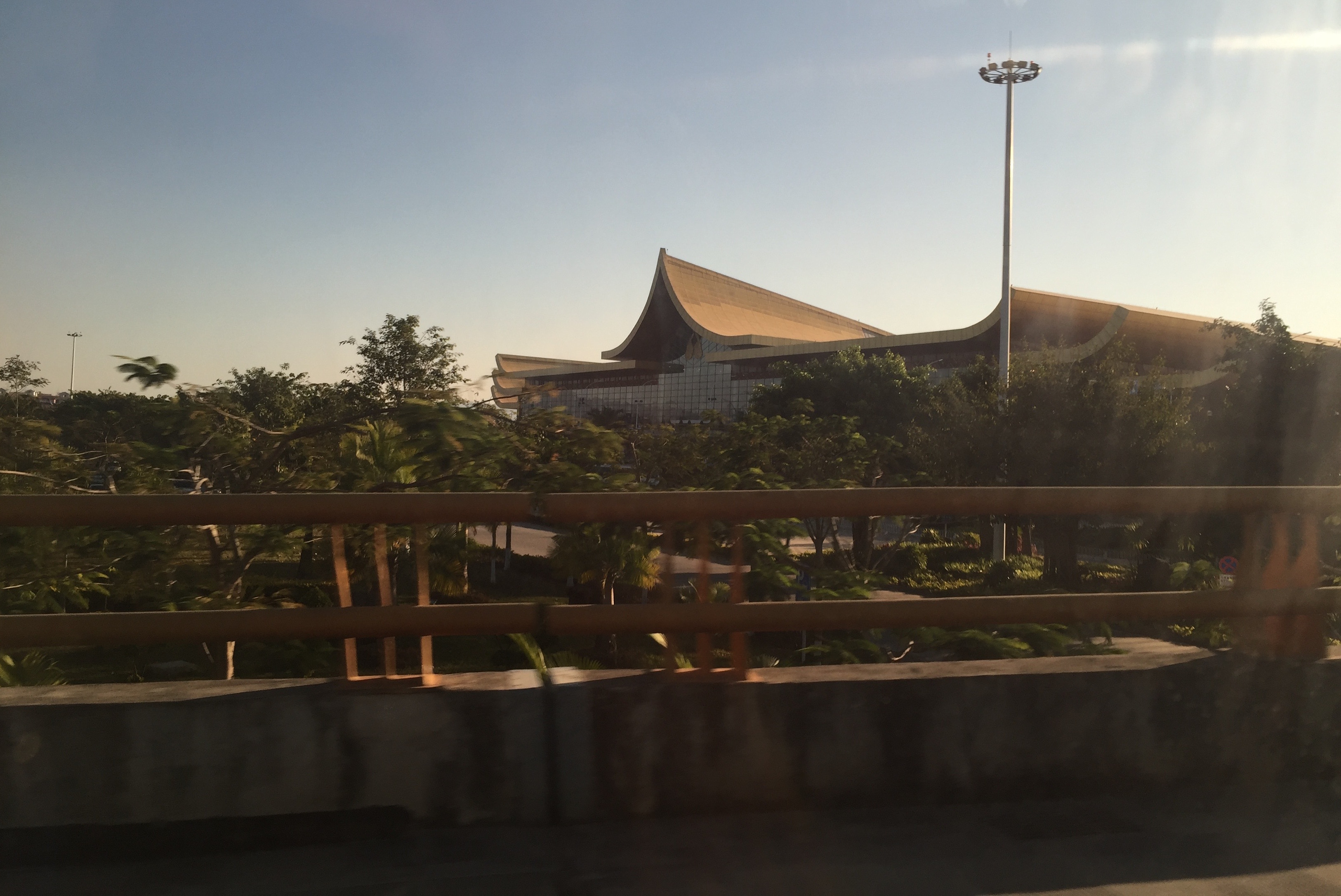
The main terminal of Jinghong Airport

- Xishuangbanna Gasa International Airport is the second largest airport in Yunnan, located just five kilometers from the downtown. Flights to Kunming, Shanghai, Chengdu and other major cities in China run regularly. There is one weekly international flight to Luang Prabang (resumes 1 November).
- The city has the largest public transportation center in Xishuangbanna and connects travelers to nearby cities, towns and villages.
- China National Highway 214
- China National Highway 213
- Asian Highway Network AH3
- Kunming–Bangkok Expressway
- Xishuangbanna railway station
- Port of Jinghong

== Places of interest ==
The Dai Water Splashing Festival and nearby villages of that and other ethnic groups are the main attractions. Additionally, at least three botanical parks and gardens are located in or near the city, of which Xishuangbanna Tropical Botanical Garden is the largest and most famous one.

== Notable people ==
- Yan Long - soldier
- Vanda Margraf - actress
