= Xishuangbanna Gasa International Airport =

Airport serving Jinghong, Yunnan, China

Xishuangbanna Gasa International Airport 西双版纳嘎洒国际机场
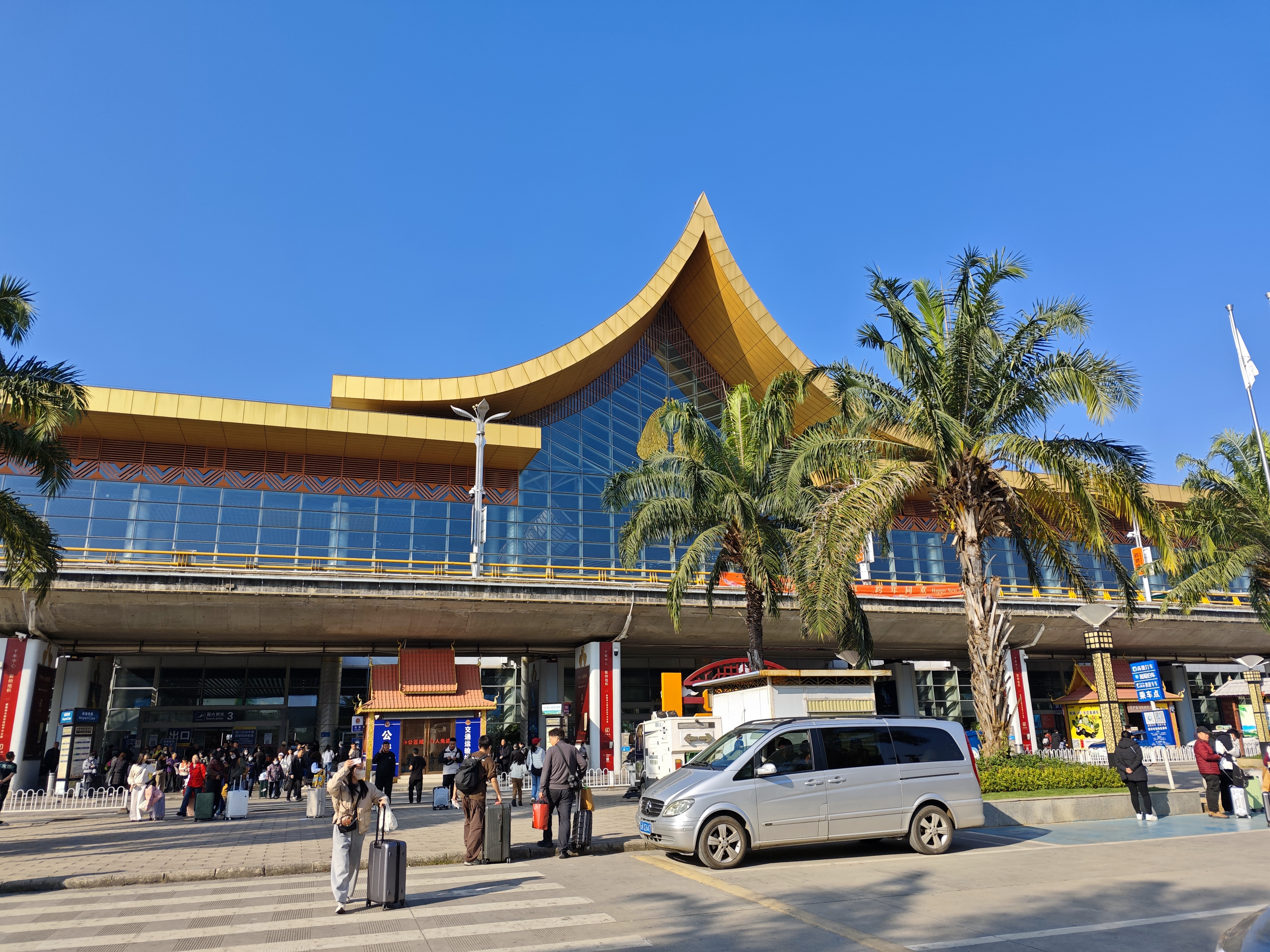
- IATA: JHG; ICAO: ZPJH

Summary
- Airport type: Public
- Serves: Xishuangbanna Dai Autonomous Prefecture
- Location: Gasa Town, Jinghong, Yunnan, China
- Opened: 7 April 1990; 36 years ago
- Elevation AMSL: 553 m (1,814 ft)
- Coordinates: 21°58′26.09″N 100°45′34.6″E
- Website: bn.ynairport.com

Map
- Location in Yunnan JHG/ZPJH (China)

Runways
Direction	Length		Surface
Direction	m	ft	Surface
16/34	2,400	7,874	Asphalt

Statistics (2025)
- Passengers: 7,711,821 ▲7.7%
- Cargo (metric tons): 26,019.4 ▲15.1%
- Aircraft movements: 54,864 ▲4.9%
- Source: List of the busiest airports in China

Xishuangbanna Gasa International Airport
- Simplified Chinese: 西双版纳嘎洒国际机场
- Traditional Chinese: 西雙版納嘎灑國際機場
Transcriptions
Standard Mandarin
- Hanyu Pinyin: Xīshuāngbǎnnà Gāsǎ Guójì Jīchǎng

Xishuangbanna Gasa International Airport (IATA: JHG, ICAO: ZPJH) is an airport serving the city of Jinghong in Southwestern China's Yunnan province. It is 6 km (3.7 mi) from Jinghong City. It is named after the town of Gasa, where it is situated. In 2025, it handled 7,711,821 passengers, making it the 47th busiest airport in China.

== Airlines and destinations ==
Airlines	Destinations
Air China	Chengdu–Tianfu
Air Guilin	Chengdu–Tianfu, Haikou, Jinan, Xuzhou
Air Travel	Shiyan, Wuxi
Beijing Capital Airlines	Beijing–Daxing, Nanjing, Shanghai–Pudong, Shenyang, Shijiazhuang, Xi'an, Hangzhou
Chengdu Airlines	Changchun, Changsha, Chengdu–Shuangliu, Chengdu–Tianfu
China Eastern Airlines	Beijing–Daxing, Chengdu–Tianfu, Hangzhou, Hefei, Kunming, Nanchang, Nanjing, Ningbo, Shanghai–Pudong
China Express Airlines	Tianjin, Xi'an
China Southern Airlines	Shenyang, Shenzhen, Wuhan
Chongqing Airlines	Chongqing, Guangzhou
Colorful Guizhou Airlines	Guiyang
Donghai Airlines	Guiyang, Hefei, Nantong, Shenzhen, Yichang
Juneyao Air	Huizhou, Shanghai–Pudong, Wuxi
Kunming Airlines	Changsha, Chengdu–Tianfu, Guiyang, Lijiang, Yangzhou
LJ Air	Changsha, Ningbo, Taiyuan, Zhanjiang
Loong Air	Changchun, Nanjing, Wenzhou, Wuhan
Lucky Air	Changchun, Chongqing, Dali, Hangzhou, Harbin, Jinan, Lijiang, Luzhou, Nanchang, Ningbo, Shijiazhuang, Xi'an, Zhengzhou, Zunyi–Maotai
Okay Airways	Hangzhou, Xingyi
Qingdao Airlines	Beijing–Daxing, Changchun, Changsha, Lijiang, Nanchang, Qingdao, Shenyang, Shijiazhuang, Vientiane, Xichang, Zhengzhou
Ruili Airlines	Fuzhou, Ho Chi Minh City, Lanzhou, Lijiang, Mangshi, Nanning, Tianjin
Shanghai Airlines	Kunming, Shanghai–Hongqiao
Sichuan Airlines	Beijing–Capital, Chengdu–Tianfu, Chongqing, Hangzhou, Harbin, Jinan, Luzhou, Mianyang, Xi'an, Yibin, Zhengzhou
Spring Airlines	Shanghai–Pudong
Tianjin Airlines	Tianjin
Tibet Airlines	Chengdu–Shuangliu, Jinan, Lhasa, Mianyang, Xi'an
West Air	Chongqing
XiamenAir	Fuzhou, Xiamen

== See also ==
- List of airports in China
