= Mengla County =

Mengla County 勐腊县 · ᦵᦙᦲᧂ ᦟᦱᧉ ᦶᦉᧃᧈ
- County
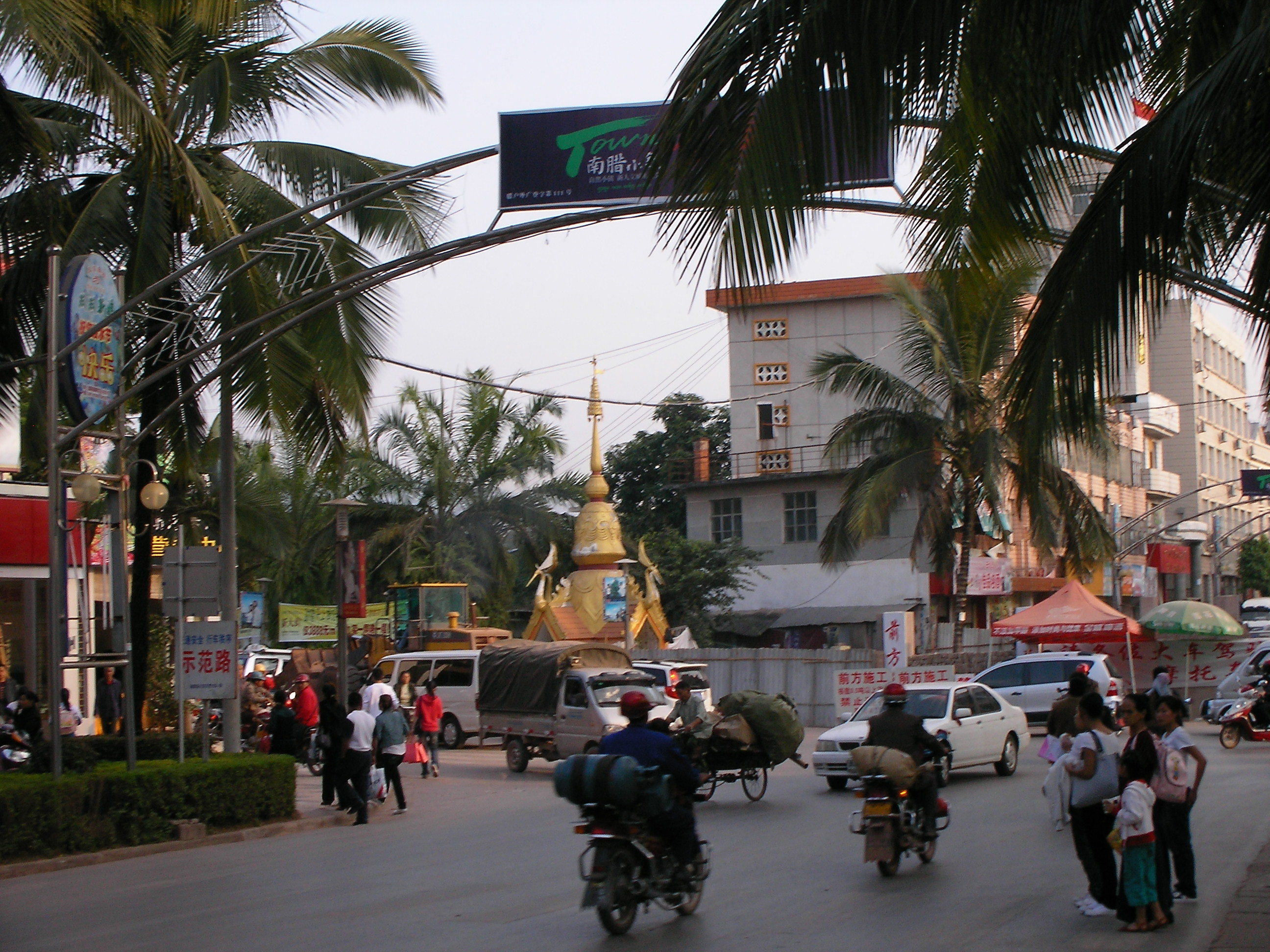
- Traffic in the town of Mengla

- Location of Mengla County (red) within Xishuangbanna Prefecture (pink) and Yunnan

- Location of the seat in Yunnan
- Coordinates (Mengla government): 21°27′32″N 101°33′50″E
- Country: China
- Province: Yunnan
- Autonomous prefecture: Xishuangbanna
- GB/T 2260 CODE: 532823
- County seat: Mengla

Area
  - Total: 7,056 km^{2} (2,724 sq mi)

Population (2020 census)
  - Total: 304,950
  - Density: 43.22/km^{2} (111.9/sq mi)
- Time zone: UTC+8 (China Standard)
- Postal code: 666300
- Area code: 0691
- Website: www.ynml.gov.cn
- ^{1}Yunnan Statistics Bureau^{2}Xishuangbanna Gov.^{3}Yunnan Portal

Mengla County (simplified Chinese: 勐腊县; traditional Chinese: 勐臘縣; pinyin: Měnglà Xiàn; Tai Lue: ᦵᦙᦲᧂ ᦟᦱᧉ ᦶᦉᧃᧈ, Mueang La; Burmese: မိုးလား, Lao: ເມືອງລ້າ; Thai: เมืองล้า) is a county under the jurisdiction of the Xishuangbanna Dai Autonomous Prefecture, in far southern Yunnan province, China. Meng is a variation of Mueang.

== Name ==
"Mongla", "Mengla" and "Meungla" are different romanizations of the same Tai word. Thus, to differentiate Mengla County in China and Mong La Township in Myanmar, the locals call the former Greater Mengla/Mongla while the latter Lesser Mongla/Mengla.

== Administrative divisions ==
Mengla County has 8 towns and 2 townships.

8 Towns:

- Mengla (勐腊镇), Mengpeng (勐捧镇), Mengman (勐满镇), Menglun (勐仑镇), Mohan (磨憨镇), Mengban (勐伴镇), Guanlei (关累镇), and Yiwu (易武镇)

2 Ethnic Townships:

- Yi Xiangming (象明彝族乡) and Yao Yaoqu (瑶区瑶族乡)

== Biodiversity ==
Xishuangbanna Tropical Botanical Garden, of the Chinese Academy of Sciences (CAS), is located in Menglun in Mengla County, covering an area of more than 1000 ha. Over 13,000 species of tropical plants are preserved in its 35 living collections.

The last Indochinese tiger in the wild in China is believed to have been killed near Mengla in 2009. The perpetrator is believed to have been sentenced to 12 years imprisonment for this.

A tiny frog, Raorchestes menglaensis (known as the Zhishihe's bubble-nest frog or Mengla small treefrog) is only known from its type locality, Zhishihe in Mengla County.

== Climate ==
Mengla has a humid subtropical climate with monsoonal influences (Köppen Cwa) closely bordering on the tropical savanna climate (Köppen Aw) with strong monsoonal influences. Summer is long and there is virtually no "winter" as such; instead, there is a dry season (December–April) and wet season (May–October). The coolest month is December, averaging 18.9 °C (66.0 °F), while the warmest is June, at 26.9 °C (80.4 °F); the annual mean is 23.7 °C (74.7 °F). However, high temperatures reach their peak in April before the onset of the monsoon from the Indian Ocean.

Climate data for Mengla, elevation 633 m (2,077 ft), (1991–2020 normals, extremes 1971–present)
Month	Jan	Feb	Mar	Apr	May	Jun	Jul	Aug	Sep	Oct	Nov	Dec	Year
Record high °C (°F)	32.1 (89.8)	34.3 (93.7)	37.0 (98.6)	37.5 (99.5)	39.9 (103.8)	36.7 (98.1)	35.3 (95.5)	35.0 (95.0)	34.1 (93.4)	33.9 (93.0)	33.3 (91.9)	30.3 (86.5)	39.9 (103.8)
Mean daily maximum °C (°F)	25.6 (78.1)	28.3 (82.9)	30.8 (87.4)	32.3 (90.1)	32.2 (90.0)	31.3 (88.3)	30.2 (86.4)	30.6 (87.1)	30.2 (86.4)	29.2 (84.6)	27.2 (81.0)	24.6 (76.3)	29.4 (84.9)
Daily mean °C (°F)	16.7 (62.1)	18.1 (64.6)	20.8 (69.4)	23.5 (74.3)	25.1 (77.2)	25.7 (78.3)	25.2 (77.4)	25.0 (77.0)	24.5 (76.1)	22.8 (73.0)	19.7 (67.5)	16.8 (62.2)	22.0 (71.6)
Mean daily minimum °C (°F)	12.1 (53.8)	12.1 (53.8)	14.7 (58.5)	18.3 (64.9)	20.9 (69.6)	22.5 (72.5)	22.6 (72.7)	22.4 (72.3)	21.6 (70.9)	19.7 (67.5)	16.1 (61.0)	13.1 (55.6)	18.0 (64.4)
Record low °C (°F)	0.5 (32.9)	5.9 (42.6)	6.1 (43.0)	11.2 (52.2)	15.7 (60.3)	18.4 (65.1)	18.2 (64.8)	18.0 (64.4)	15.3 (59.5)	9.4 (48.9)	6.1 (43.0)	1.1 (34.0)	0.5 (32.9)
Average precipitation mm (inches)	25.3 (1.00)	19.1 (0.75)	54.4 (2.14)	101.0 (3.98)	157.3 (6.19)	195.5 (7.70)	323.4 (12.73)	313.9 (12.36)	157.9 (6.22)	78.9 (3.11)	43.9 (1.73)	31.6 (1.24)	1,502.2 (59.15)
Average precipitation days (≥ 0.1 mm)	3.6	3.2	6.1	12.4	17.4	20.8	24.6	23.3	15.7	10.4	5.8	4.2	147.5
Average relative humidity (%)	83	76	75	77	80	83	86	87	85	84	85	85	82
Mean monthly sunshine hours	169.2	192.9	205.3	199.9	199.7	137.9	101.1	120.2	157.6	159.6	167.6	156.2	1,967.2
Percentage possible sunshine	50	60	55	53	49	34	25	30	43	45	51	47	45
Source 1: China Meteorological Administration all-time November record high
Source 2: Weather China

== Transport ==
- Nearest airport is Xishuangbanna Gasa
- China National Highway 213
- Asian Highway Network AH3
- Kunming-Bangkok Expressway
- Yuxi–Mohan Railway

== See also ==
- Mong La
- Muang La
- Muong La
