= Yuxi railway station (Yunnan) =

Railway station in Dongguan, Guangdong

Yuxi 玉溪
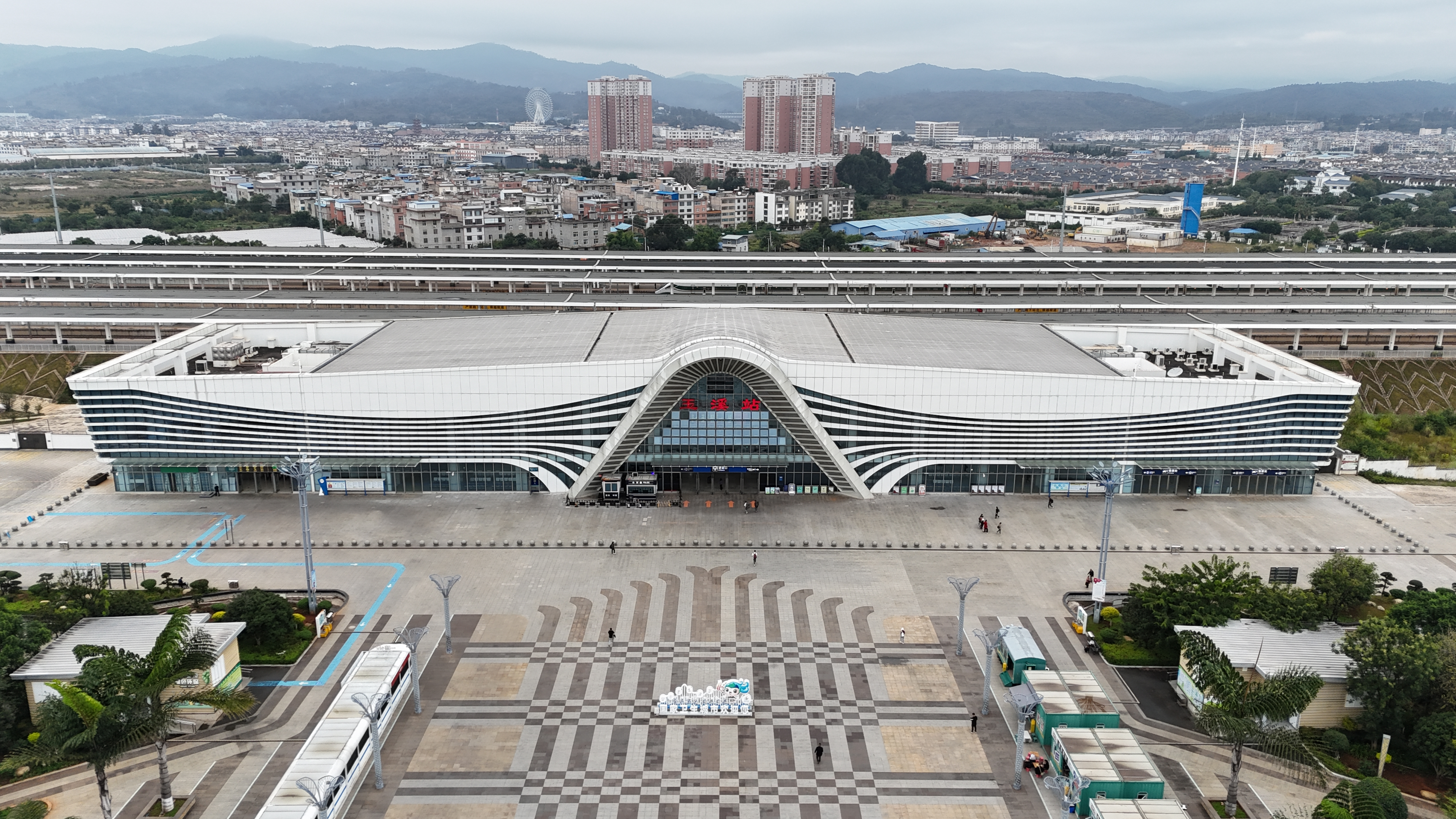

General information
- Location: Hongta District, Yuxi, Yunnan; China
- Coordinates: 24.339046°N 102.511769°E
- Operated by: CR Kunming
- Line(s): Kunming–Yuxi–Hekou railway; Yuxi–Mohan railway

History
- Opened: 15 December 2016

Yuxi railway station (Chinese: 玉溪站) is a railway station in Hongta District, Yuxi, Yunnan, China.

== History ==
Prior to opening, the station was known as Yuxi West. On 16 November 2016, the station was renamed Yuxi. The station formerly named Yuxi was simultaneously renamed Yuxi West railway station. Yuxi railway station opened on 15 December 2016. Simultaneously, Yuxi West railway station was closed to passengers.

The Yuxi–Mohan railway was opened on December 3, 2021.
