= Yiwu, Mengla County =

Yiwu 易武镇
- Town
- Location in Yunnan
- Coordinates: 21°58′42″N 101°28′16″E
- Country: People's Republic of China
- Province: Yunnan
- Autonomous prefecture: Xishuangbanna
- County: Mengla

Area
  - Total: 878.2 km^{2} (339.1 sq mi)

Population (2007)
  - Total: 13,471
  - Density: 15.34/km^{2} (39.73/sq mi)
- Time zone: UTC+8 (China Standard)
- Postal code: 666306
- Area code: 0691

Yiwu (Chinese: 易武; pinyin: Yìwǔ) is a town in Mengla County, Xishuangbanna Dai Autonomous Prefecture, Yunnan province, China, bordering Laos's Phôngsali to the east.

Yiwu was established as a township in 1988. It merged Manla Township (曼腊彝族瑶族乡) on 30 September 2004, and was re-organized as a town in January 2015.

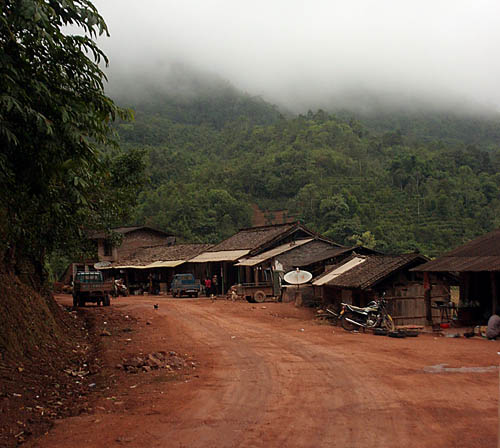
The dirt highway, one of the two streets in the village, running north–south through Xinzhai village, Yiwu. The only road apart from the highway runs to the border.(November 2004)

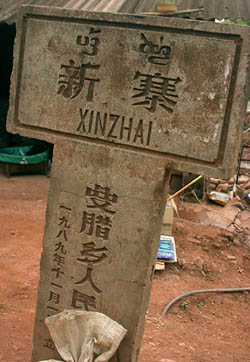
The township sign of Xinzhai village, Yiwu, in Dai and Chinese scripts. (November 2004)
