= Mohan, Yunnan =

Mohan 磨憨 ᦢᦸᧈ ᦠᦱᧃ
- Town
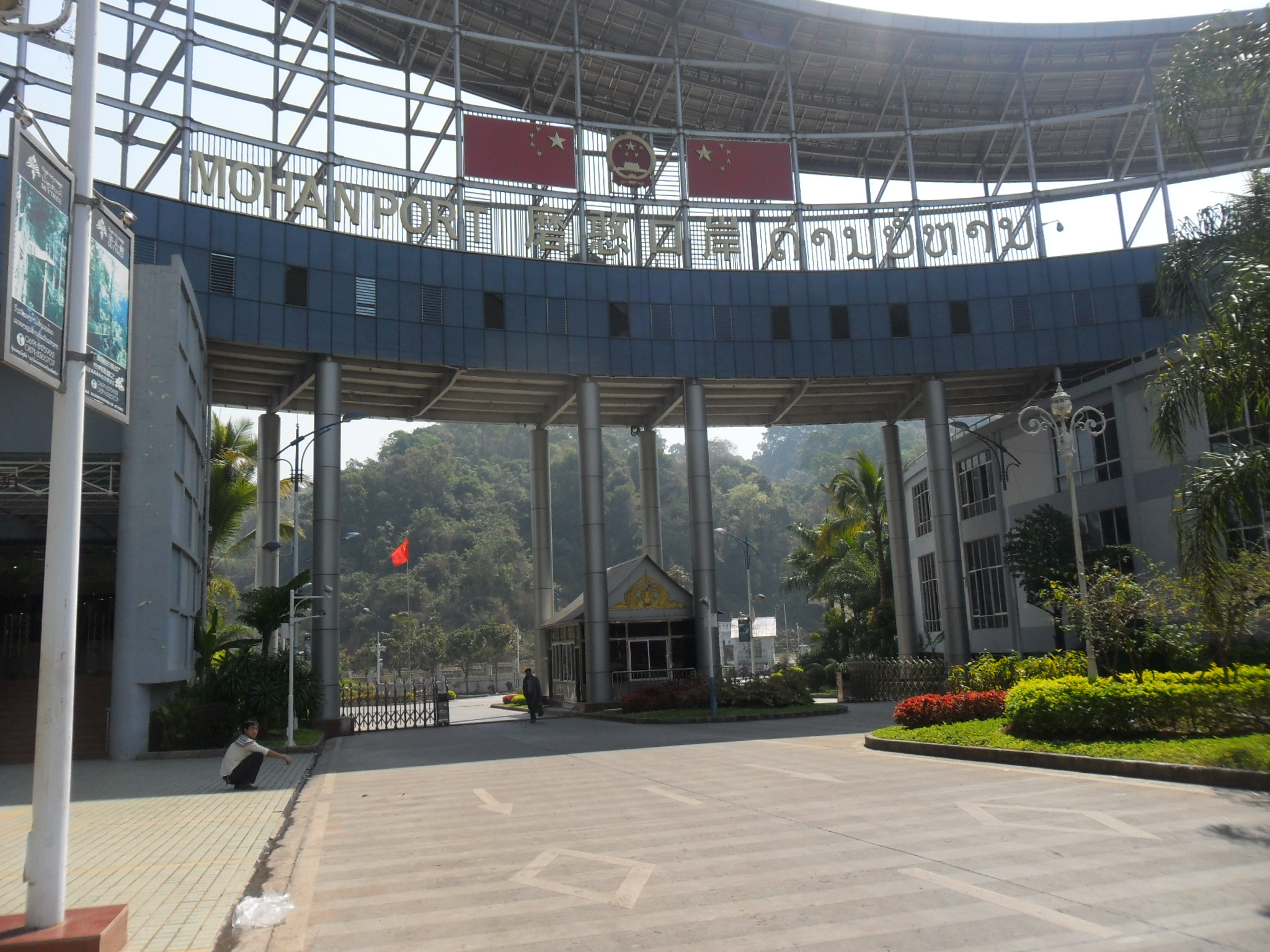
- Mohan Checkpoint

- Location in Yunnan, China
- Coordinates: 21°12′25″N 101°42′10″E
- Country: People's Republic of China

Area
  - Total: 803 km^{2} (310 sq mi)
- Elevation: 850 m (2,790 ft)

Mohan (simplified Chinese: 磨憨; Tai Lue: ᦢᦸᧈ ᦠᦱᧃ Bo Han) is a border town in the south of Mengla County, Yunnan, China, directly on the border of Laos and China.

== Administrative divisions ==
Mohan is divided into 2 communities and 6 villages:

- Kouan Community
- Shangyong Community
- Shangyong Village
- Shanggang Village
- Manzhuang Village
- Molong Village
- Longmen Village
- Longgan Village

== Transport ==
Mohan lies at the southern end (2,827 km) of China National Highway 213. It is the interchange of two railway lines, the Yuxi–Mohan railway to China, and the Vientiane–Boten Railway to Laos, both opened in 2021.

== Biodiversity ==
The surrounding area has 3890 plant species, and 756 animal species.

== Climate ==
Climate data for Mengla County/Mohan (1971−2000)
Month	Jan	Feb	Mar	Apr	May	Jun	Jul	Aug	Sep	Oct	Nov	Dec	Year
Record high °C (°F)	30.0 (86.0)	33.8 (92.8)	35.6 (96.1)	37.5 (99.5)	38.4 (101.1)	36.7 (98.1)	34.5 (94.1)	34.3 (93.7)	33.7 (92.7)	33.2 (91.8)	31.9 (89.4)	30.0 (86.0)	38.4 (101.1)
Mean daily maximum °C (°F)	25.0 (77.0)	27.5 (81.5)	30.3 (86.5)	31.9 (89.4)	31.5 (88.7)	30.6 (87.1)	29.7 (85.5)	29.8 (85.6)	30.0 (86.0)	28.6 (83.5)	26.1 (79.0)	23.7 (74.7)	28.7 (83.7)
Daily mean °C (°F)	18.3 (64.9)	19.6 (67.3)	22.1 (71.8)	24.8 (76.6)	26.1 (79.0)	26.4 (79.5)	25.9 (78.6)	25.9 (78.6)	25.5 (77.9)	23.8 (74.8)	20.9 (69.6)	17.9 (64.2)	23.1 (73.6)
Mean daily minimum °C (°F)	11.6 (52.9)	11.8 (53.2)	14.0 (57.2)	17.7 (63.9)	20.7 (69.3)	22.3 (72.1)	22.2 (72.0)	22.0 (71.6)	21.1 (70.0)	19.1 (66.4)	15.7 (60.3)	12.2 (54.0)	17.5 (63.6)
Record low °C (°F)	0.5 (32.9)	5.9 (42.6)	6.1 (43.0)	11.2 (52.2)	15.7 (60.3)	18.4 (65.1)	18.2 (64.8)	18.8 (65.8)	15.3 (59.5)	9.4 (48.9)	6.1 (43.0)	1.1 (34.0)	0.5 (32.9)
Average precipitation mm (inches)	17.8 (0.70)	21.4 (0.84)	40.5 (1.59)	98.5 (3.88)	169.9 (6.69)	211.6 (8.33)	317.2 (12.49)	307.1 (12.09)	165.4 (6.51)	91.8 (3.61)	52.8 (2.08)	26.7 (1.05)	1,520.7 (59.86)
Average precipitation days (≥ 0.1 mm)	5.5	4.2	6.0	12.9	18.5	22.1	25.5	23.6	16.5	12.0	7.3	5.7	159.8
Source: Weather China
