= Foreign relations of Laos =

The foreign relations of Laos, internationally designated by its official name as the Lao People's Democratic Republic, after the takeover by the Pathet Lao in December 1975, were characterized by a hostile posture toward the West, with the government of the Lao People's Democratic Republic aligning itself with the Soviet bloc, maintaining close ties with the Soviet Union and depending heavily on the Soviets for most of its foreign assistance. Laos also maintained a "special relationship" with Vietnam and formalized a 1977 treaty of friendship and cooperation that created tensions with China.

With the collapse of the Soviet Union and with Vietnam's decreased ability to provide assistance, Laos has sought to improve relations with its regional neighbors and has emerged from international isolation through improved and expanded relations with other nations, such as Pakistan, Saudi Arabia, China, Turkey, Australia, France, Japan, and Sweden. Trade relations with the United States were normalized in 2004. Laos was admitted into the Association of Southeast Asian Nations (ASEAN) in July 1997 and applied to join the World Trade Organization in 1998. In 2005 it attended the inaugural East Asia Summit.

== Membership of international bodies ==
Laos is a member of the following international organizations: Agency for Cultural and Technical Cooperation (ACCT), ASEAN, ASEAN Free Trade Area (AFTA), ASEAN Regional Forum, ASEAN-Japan Centre (AJC) Asian Development Bank, Colombo Plan, United Nations Economic and Social Commission for Asia and the Pacific (ESCAP), Food and Agriculture Organization (FAO), Group of 77, International Bank for Reconstruction and Development (World Bank), International Civil Aviation Organization (ICAO), International Development Association (IDA), International Fund for Agricultural Development (IFAD), International Finance Corporation (IFC), International Federation of Red Cross and Red Crescent Societies, International Labour Organization (ILO), International Monetary Fund (IMF), Intelsat (nonsignatory user), and Interpol.

Laos is also a member of the International Olympic Commission (IOC), International Telecommunication Union (ITU), Mekong Group, Non-Aligned Movement (NAM), Pacific Alliance (as observer), Permanent Court of Arbitration (PCA), United Nations, United Nations Convention on Trade and Development (UNCTAD), United Nations Educational, Scientific and Cultural Organization (UNESCO), United Nations Industrial Development Organization (UNIDO), Universal Postal Union (UPU), World Federation of Trade Unions, World Health Organization (WHO), World Intellectual Property Organization (WIPO), World Meteorological Organization (WMO), World Tourism Organization, World Trade Organization (observer).

== Diplomatic relations ==
List of countries which Laos maintains diplomatic relations with:

	Country	Date
1	United States	29 July 1950
2	Thailand	19 December 1950
3	France	31 January 1951
4	Australia	16 January 1952
5	Philippines	14 January 1955
6	Japan	5 March 1955
7	Myanmar	12 July 1955
8	United Kingdom	5 September 1955
9	India	2 February 1956
10	Cambodia	15 June 1956
11	Denmark	1 November 1956
12	Indonesia	30 August 1957
13	Switzerland	3 September 1957
14	Netherlands	17 November 1957
15	Germany	31 January 1958
16	Turkey	20 June 1958
17	Nepal	20 May 1960
18	Russia	7 October 1960
19	China	25 April 1961
20	Czech Republic	5 September 1962
21	Vietnam	5 September 1962
22	Poland	8 September 1962
23	Hungary	12 September 1962
24	Mongolia	12 September 1962
25	Bulgaria	14 October 1962
26	Romania	25 November 1962
27	Serbia	25 November 1962
28	Lebanon	15 July 1963
29	Spain	20 March 1964
30	Sweden	10 October 1964
31	New Zealand	15 July 1965
32	Pakistan	15 July 1965
33	Sri Lanka	20 July 1965
34	Italy	7 December 1965
35	Malaysia	1 July 1966
36	Iran	1967
37	Austria	1 September 1967
38	Belgium	12 December 1967
39	Algeria	15 May 1973
40	Canada	15 June 1974
41	North Korea	24 June 1974
42	Cuba	4 November 1974
43	Singapore	2 December 1974
44	Finland	21 January 1975
45	Albania	18 June 1975
46	Argentina	24 July 1975
47	Iraq	2 October 1975
48	Libya	26 July 1976
49	Yemen	26 July 1976
50	Egypt	November 1976
51	Mexico	29 November 1976
52	Benin	2 February 1977
53	Mali	2 February 1977
54	Tanzania	15 May 1978
55	Madagascar	27 February 1980
56	Somalia	27 February 1980
57	Grenada	4 March 1980
58	Mozambique	16 April 1980
59	Nicaragua	30 May 1980
60	Angola	11 July 1980
61	Guinea	15 October 1981
62	Afghanistan	11 March 1983
63	Zimbabwe	14 August 1986
64	Vanuatu	18 February 1987
—	Sahrawi Arab Democratic Republic	3 August 1987
65	Colombia	30 September 1988
66	Bangladesh	1988
67	Peru	27 April 1989
—	State of Palestine	15 May 1989
68	Greece	15 June 1989
69	Tunisia	30 November 1989
70	Papua New Guinea	6 April 1990
71	Saudi Arabia	29 May 1990
72	Norway	12 November 1991
73	Chile	6 December 1991
74	Uzbekistan	10 September 1992
75	Ukraine	17 September 1992
76	Slovakia	1 January 1993
77	Brunei	27 July 1993
78	Israel	6 December 1993
79	Turkmenistan	4 February 1994
80	Belarus	7 February 1994
81	Lithuania	1 September 1994
82	South Africa	27 September 1994
83	Estonia	29 March 1995
84	Latvia	27 April 1995
85	Azerbaijan	22 May 1995
86	Portugal	31 May 1995
87	Brazil	12 June 1995
88	Kyrgyzstan	13 July 1995
89	South Korea	25 October 1995
90	Croatia	4 March 1996
91	North Macedonia	6 March 1996
92	Bosnia and Herzegovina	7 March 1996
93	Slovenia	28 March 1996
94	United Arab Emirates	15 October 1996
95	Zambia	9 November 1996
96	Morocco	30 January 1997
97	Moldova	25 May 1997
98	Kazakhstan	19 September 1997
99	Tajikistan	23 September 1997
100	Luxembourg	25 September 1997
101	Armenia	21 April 1998
102	Ireland	7 August 1998
103	Georgia	6 November 1998
104	Nigeria	10 June 1999
105	Jamaica	27 August 1999
106	Cyprus	29 June 2000
107	Mauritius	23 May 2002
108	Timor-Leste	29 July 2002
109	Bahrain	15 December 2002
110	Liechtenstein	8 January 2004
111	Iceland	2 September 2004
112	Syria	22 December 2004
113	Qatar	3 February 2005
114	Oman	9 March 2005
115	Paraguay	28 September 2005
116	Venezuela	5 October 2005
117	Sudan	14 October 2005
118	Ethiopia	9 December 2005
119	Seychelles	22 June 2006
120	Niger	8 December 2006
121	Andorra	8 June 2007
122	Burkina Faso	1 August 2007
123	Dominican Republic	27 September 2007
124	Guatemala	20 February 2008
125	Kuwait	14 July 2008
126	Ivory Coast	22 July 2008
127	Kenya	11 December 2008
128	Rwanda	31 August 2009
129	Montenegro	3 February 2010
130	Fiji	27 August 2010
131	Malta	13 January 2011
132	Ecuador	12 September 2011
133	Maldives	10 February 2012
134	Mauritania	19 September 2013
135	Costa Rica	28 September 2015
136	Monaco	27 November 2015
137	Liberia	12 August 2016
138	Saint Kitts and Nevis	23 September 2017
139	San Marino	17 December 2018
140	Republic of the Congo	29 August 2019
141	Ghana	27 September 2019
142	Dominica	29 July 2021
143	Panama	9 September 2021
144	Uganda	27 September 2021
145	Burundi	4 February 2022
146	Botswana	11 December 2023
147	Uruguay	19 September 2024
148	Bolivia	6 November 2024
149	Jordan	7 January 2026
150	Bahamas	30 June 2026
151	El Salvador	28 July 2026
152	Trinidad and Tobago	29 September 2026
153	Bhutan	4 November 2026

== Bilateral relations ==
Country	Formal Relations Began	Notes
Brunei		Main article: Brunei–Laos relations: Brunei has an embassy in Vientiane.; Laos has an embassy in Bandar Seri Begawan.
Cambodia		Main article: Cambodia–Laos relations: Cambodia has an embassy in Vientiane and a consulate-general in Pakse.; Laos has an embassy in Phnom Penh and a consulate-general in Stung Treng City.
China		Main article: China–Laos relations Relations with the People's Republic of China have improved over the years. Although the two were allies during the Vietnam War, the Sino-Vietnamese War in 1979 led to a sharp deterioration in Sino-Lao relations. These relations began to improve in the late 1980s. In 1989 Sino-Lao relations were normalized. In 2017 China invested in Laos under its Belt and Road Initiative.: China has an embassy in Vientiane and a consulate-general in Luang Prabang.; Laos has an embassy in Beijing and consulates-general in Changsha, Guangzhou, Hong Kong, Kunming, Nanning and Shanghai.
France		Following its occupation of Vietnam, France absorbed Laos into French Indochina via treaties with Siam in 1893 and 1904. During World War II, the Japanese occupied French Indochina. When Japan surrendered, Lao nationalists declared Laos independent, but by early 1946, French troops had reoccupied the country and conferred limited autonomy on Laos. During the First Indochina War, the Indochinese Communist Party formed the Pathet Lao resistance organization committed to Lao independence. Laos gained full independence following the French defeat by the Vietnamese communists and the subsequent Geneva peace conference in 1954.: France has an embassy in Vientiane.; Laos has an embassy in Paris.
Germany		Main article: Germany–Laos relations: Germany has an embassy in Vientiane.; Laos has an embassy in Berlin.
India		Main article: India—Laos relations: India has an embassy in Vientiane.; Laos has an embassy in New Delhi.
Indonesia	1957	Main article: Indonesia–Laos relations Since established diplomatic relations on 1957, both nations enjoy cordial relations. Indonesia supported and welcomed Laos membership to the Association of Southeast Asian Nations (ASEAN) in 1997. Laos and Indonesia agreed to enhance relations to focus on exploring the potential of both nations to cooperate on trade and investment. The two nations expressed a desire to reach further agreements relating to security, tourism, sport, air transport and education. Indonesia through bilateral cooperation assists Laos on capacity building and development in various sectors, through scholarships, and trainings for Laos students.: Indonesia has an embassy in Vientiane.; Laos has an embassy in Jakarta.
Israel		See also: List of ambassadors of Israel to Laos
Japan		Main article: Japan–Laos relations: Japan has an embassy in Vientiane.; Laos has an embassy in Tokyo.
Malaysia		Main article: Laos–Malaysia relations During the collapse of the Communist Bloc, the Soviet Union could no longer afford aid for the development of Laos. This made Laos seek aid from other countries to help develop their country and has led the country to adopt a neutral foreign policy. When this policy of neutrality was adopted, relations with Malaysia were established.: Laos has an embassy in Kuala Lumpur.; Malaysia has an embassy in Vientiane.
Mexico	1976	Laos is accredited to Mexico from its embassy in Washington, D.C.; Mexico is accredited to Laos from its embassy in Hanoi, Vietnam.
Myanmar		Main article: Laos–Myanmar relations: Laos has an embassy in Yangon.; Myanmar has an embassy in Vientiane.
Pakistan		Main article: Laos–Pakistan relations: Pakistan is accredited to Laos from its embassy in Bangkok, Thailand.
Philippines		Main article: Laos–Philippines relations Formal relations between Laos and the Philippines were officially established on 14 January 1955. Relations between the two countries were said to have started during the early period of the Vietnam War. Operation Brotherhood, a joint international venture by Jaycees International, sent 50 volunteer Filipino doctors, agriculturists, and nutritionists to Laos and Vietnam from 1957 to 1964. Laos has an embassy in Manila while the Philippines has an embassy in Vientiane. Lao Prime Ministers Bounnhang Vorachith, Bouasone Bouphavanh and Thongsing Thammavong made their state visit to the Philippines in 2002, June 2007 and May 2012 respectively. Philippine Presidents Fidel V. Ramos visited Laos in October 1997. Philippine President Gloria Macapagal-Arroyo visited Laos in November 2004 for the ASEAN summit and Philippine President Benigno Aquino III visited Laos in November 2012 for the Asia-Europe Meeting Summit. There are about 730 Filipinos in Laos as of 2013, mostly working as professionals as teachers, nurses, engineers, hotel employees and consultants. Filipinos are often offered lower fares on riding tuktuks compared to other foreigners. Filipinos are one of the biggest contributors to Laos' English programs due to the English fluency possessed by most Filipinos.: Laos has an embassy in Manila.; Philippines has an embassy in Vientiane.
Russia		Main article: Laos–Russia relations: Laos has an embassy in Moscow.; Russia has an embassy in Vientiane.
Serbia	1962	Both countries have established diplomatic relations in 1962.: Serbia is accredited to Laos from its embassy in Yangon, Myanmar.
South Korea		Main article: Laos–South Korea relations: Ko-Laoholdings is a South Korean company in Laos which is currently the largest private enterprise. and Establishment of Diplomatic Relations : Jun.22, 1974 / Severance - Jul.24, 1975 / Reestablishment - Oct.25, 1995.; Laos has an embassy in Seoul.; South Korea has an embassy in Vientiane.
Thailand		Main article: Laos–Thailand relations Thai-Lao relations were strained somewhat in 2006 ahead of the release of the sports comedy Lucky Loser, which Lao diplomats warned might offend Lao people and spark disturbances similar to the 2003 Phnom Penh riots. The film's release was cancelled. Thailand is Laos' principal means of access to the sea and its primary trading partner. Despite strong economic and cultural ties with Thailand, parts of the border shared by the two countries are indefinite. Within a year of serious border clashes in 1987, Lao and Thai leaders signed a communiqué, signaling their intention to improve relations. Since then, they have made slow but steady progress, notably the construction and opening of the Friendship Bridge between the two countries.: Laos has an embassy in Bangkok and a consulate-general in Khon Kaen.; Thailand has an embassy in Vientiane and a consulate-general in Savannakhet.
Turkey	1958	Main article: Laos–Turkey relations: The Embassy of Laos in Vienna is accredited to Turkey.; Turkey has an embassy in Vientiane.; Trade volume between the two countries was US$2.86 billion in 2018 (Laos' exports/imports: 1.48/1.44 billion USD).
United Kingdom	1955	Main article: Laos–United Kingdom relations Laos established diplomatic relations with the United Kingdom on 5 September 1955.: Laos maintains an embassy in London.; The UK is accredited to Laos through its embassy in Vientiane.; Both countries share common membership of the United Nations, and the World Trade Organization. Bilaterally the two countries have an Investment Agreement.
United States		Main article: Laos–United States relations Laos-United States relations officially began when the United States opened a legation in Laos in 1950, when Laos was a semi-autonomous state within French Indochina. These relations were maintained after Laotian independence in 1954. Between 1964-1973, the United States began bombing Laos in an effort to remove the Pathet Lao from power, despite the fact Laos had been neutral during the Vietnam War. This bombing led to Laos becoming the most bombed country on earth; hence why there have been large efforts to remove unexploded mines and bombs from the country. The U.S. government provided more than $13.4 million in foreign assistance to Laos in FY 2006, in areas including unexploded ordnance clearance and removal, health and avian influenza, education, economic development, and governance. In December 2004, George W. Bush signed into law a bill extending normal trade relations to Laos. In February 2005, a bilateral trade agreement (BTA) between the two countries entered into force. There has been a consequent rise in Lao exports to the United States, although the volume of trade remains small in absolute terms. Bilateral trade reached $15.7 million in 2006, compared with $8.9 million in 2003. The Lao Government is working to implement the provisions of the BTA and on 2 February 2013 joined the World Trade Organization.: Laos has an embassy in Washington, D.C.; United States has an embassy in Vientiane.
Vietnam		Main article: Laos–Vietnam relations Although Vietnam's historical record of leadership over the Pathet Lao during the civil war and its military power and proximity will not cease to exist, Laos struck out ahead of Vietnam with its New Economic Mechanism to introduce market mechanisms into its economy. In so doing, Laos has opened the door to rapprochement with Thailand and China at some expense to its special dependence on Vietnam. Laos might have reached the same point of normalization in following Vietnam's economic and diplomatic change, but by moving ahead resolutely and responding to Thai and Chinese gestures, Laos has broadened its range of donors, trading partners, and investors independent of Vietnam's attempts to accomplish the same goal. Thus, Vietnam remains in the shadows as a mentor and emergency ally, and the tutelage of Laos has shifted dramatically to development banks and international entrepreneurs.: Laos has an embassy in Hanoi and consulates-general in Da Nang and Ho Chi Minh City.; Vietnam has an embassy in Vientiane and consulates-general in Luang Prabang, Pakse and Savannakhet.

== See also ==
- List of diplomatic missions in Laos
- List of diplomatic missions of Laos
