= List of diplomatic missions in Laos =

This is a list of diplomatic missions in Laos. At present, the capital city of Vientiane hosts 28 embassies. Several other countries have missions resident in other regional capitals.

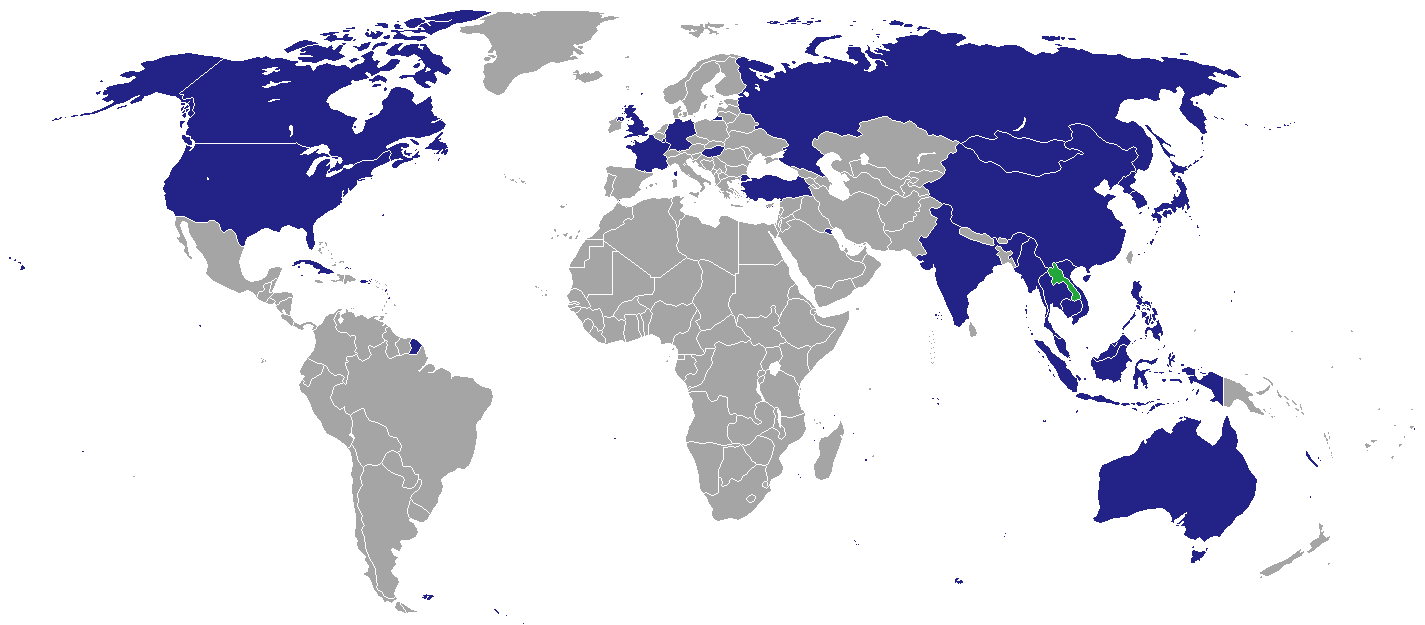
Map of diplomatic missions in Laos

== Missions in Vientiane ==
=== Embassies ===
1. Australia
2. Brunei
3. Cambodia
4. Canada
5. China
6. Cuba
7. France
8. Germany
9. Hungary
10. India
11. Indonesia
12. Japan
13. Kuwait
14. Luxembourg
15. Malaysia
16. Myanmar
17. Mongolia
18. North Korea
19. Philippines
20. Russia
21. Singapore
22. South Korea
23. Thailand
24. Turkey
25. Timor-Leste
26. United Kingdom
27. United States
28. Vietnam

== Consulates-General in Laos ==
The cities Kaysone Phomvihane, Luang Prabang, and Pakse each host two career consulates-general.

=== Kaysone Phomvihane, Savannakhet Province ===
1. Thailand
2. Vietnam

=== Luang Prabang, Luang Prabang Province ===
1. China
2. Vietnam

=== Pakse, Champasak Province ===
1. Cambodia
2. Vietnam

== Accredited embassies ==
=== Resident in Beijing ===
- Afghanistan (Note: Laos has not yet formally recognized the Islamic Emirate of Afghanistan as the de jure government of Afghanistan. The embassy in PRC is headed by a chargé d'affaires appointed by the Islamic Emirate since April 2022)
- Benin
- Chad
- Costa Rica
- Croatia
- Ethiopia
- Guinea
- Guinea-Bissau
- Iceland
- Ivory Coast
- Jamaica
- Kyrgyzstan
- Mali
- Seychelles
- Somalia
- South Sudan
- Togo
- Tunisia
- Uganda
- Vanuatu
- Yemen

=== Resident in Bangkok ===
- Austria
- Argentina
- Bahrain
- Belgium
- Brazil
- Canada
- Chile
- Czechia
- European Union (Delegation)
- Greece
- Guatemala
- Italy
- Iran
- Kenya
- Maldives
- Morocco
- Nepal
- Netherlands
- Norway
- New Zealand
- Peru
- Poland
- Portugal
- Panama
- Qatar
- Slovakia
- Spain
- South Africa
- Sri Lanka
- Sweden

=== Resident in Hanoi, Vietnam ===
- Algeria
- Angola
- Bangladesh
- Bulgaria
- Colombia
- Denmark
- Egypt
- Finland
- Haiti
- Ireland
- Israel
- Libya
- Mexico
- Nicaragua
- Oman
- Pakistan
- Palestine
- Romania
- Switzerland
- United Arab Emirates
- Uruguay
- Uzbekistan
- Venezuela

=== Resident in Kuala Lumpur, Malaysia ===
- Ghana
- Senegal
- Tanzania
- Zambia

=== Resident in Tokyo ===
- Georgia
- Paraguay

=== Resident in other places ===
- Cyprus (New York City)
- Dominican Republic (New York City)
- Dominica (New York City)
- Estonia (Stockholm)
- Fiji (Seoul)
- Latvia (Stockholm)
- Lebanon (New York City)
- Liechtenstein (Berlin)
- Lithuania (Stockholm)
- Mauritius (New York City)
- Malta (New York City)
- Mauritania (New York City)
- Moldova (Moscow)
- Monaco (Paris)
- Mozambique (New York City)
- Papua New Guinea (Jakarta)
- Rwanda (Seoul)
- Sahrawi Republic (New Delhi)
- Saudi Arabia (New Delhi)
- Seychelles (New Delhi)
- Serbia (Yangon)
- Slovenia (Seoul)
- Solomon Islands (Jakarta)
- Syria (New Delhi)
- Turkmenistan (Moscow)
- Tajikistan (Moscow)
- Zimbabwe (Jakarta)

== Closed missions ==
Host city	Sending country	Mission level	Year closed	Ref.
Vientiane	Bulgaria	Embassy	Unknown	
Vientiane	Poland	Embassy	2008	
Vientiane	South Vietnam	Embassy (Note: The South Vietnamese embassy was closed upon the fall of Saigon in April 1975, thus marking the end of the Vietnam War and the start of a transition period to the formal reunification of Vietnam.)	1975	
Vientiane	Sweden	Embassy	2008	
Phongsali	China	Consulate	1976	
Houayxay	Thailand	Consulate	Unknown	
Pakse	Thailand	Consulate	1975	

== See also ==
- Foreign relations of Laos
- List of diplomatic missions of Laos
- Visa policy of Laos
- Visa requirements for Laotian citizens
- 1987 Vientiane bombing
