= Nikitskaya Street =

Nikitskaya Street may refer to:

- Bolshaya Nikitskaya Street, radial street that runs west from Mokhovaya Street to Garden Ring in Moscow
- Malaya Nikitskaya Street, that runs parallel to Bolshaya Nikitskaya beyond the Boulevard Ring, see Embassy of Laos in Moscow and Embassy of Nigeria in Moscow
