= List of diplomatic missions of Laos =

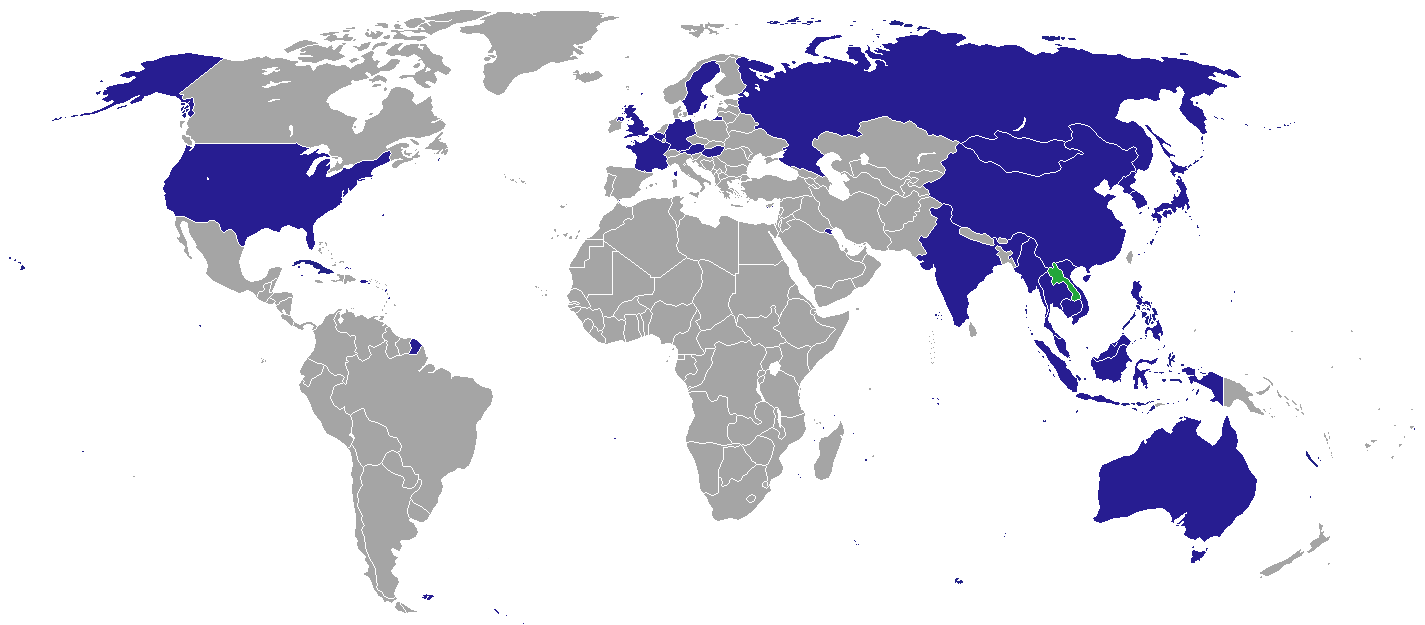
Countries hosting a diplomatic mission of Laos: Laos Embassy

This is a list of diplomatic missions of Laos. After gaining independence in 1950 the secluded landlocked country of Laos began establishing diplomatic relations with other countries in the world. It still maintains ties with traditionally Eastern bloc countries, but Laos is now more concerned with developing more practical relationships with its Asian neighbours.

== Americas ==
Host country	Host city	Mission	Concurrent accreditation	Ref.
Cuba	Havana	Embassy	Countries: Brazil; Nicaragua; Venezuela	
United States	Washington, D.C.	Embassy	Countries: Canada	

== Asia ==
Host country	Host city	Mission	Concurrent accreditation	Ref.
Brunei	Bandar Seri Begawan	Embassy		
Cambodia	Phnom Penh	Embassy		
Cambodia	Stung Treng	Consulate-General		
China	Beijing	Embassy	Countries: Pakistan	
China	Changsha	Consulate-General	Countries: Pakistan	
China	Guangzhou	Consulate-General	Countries: Pakistan	
China	Hong Kong	Consulate-General	Countries: Pakistan	
China	Kunming	Consulate-General	Countries: Pakistan	
China	Nanning	Consulate-General	Countries: Pakistan	
China	Shanghai	Consulate-General	Countries: Pakistan	
China	Jinghong	Consular office	Countries: Pakistan	
India	New Delhi	Embassy	Countries: Maldives; Nepal; Sri Lanka; South Sudan	
Indonesia	Jakarta	Embassy	Countries: East Timor	
Japan	Tokyo	Embassy		
Kuwait	Kuwait City	Embassy	Countries: Bahrain; Oman; Palestine; Qatar; United Arab Emirates	
Malaysia	Kuala Lumpur	Embassy		
Mongolia	Ulaanbaatar	Embassy		
Myanmar	Yangon	Embassy		
North Korea	Pyongyang	Embassy		
Philippines	Manila	Embassy		
Singapore	Singapore	Embassy		
South Korea	Seoul	Embassy		
Thailand	Bangkok	Embassy		
Thailand	Khon Kaen	Consulate-General		
Vietnam	Hanoi	Embassy		
Vietnam	Danang	Consulate-General		
Vietnam	Ho Chi Minh City	Consulate-General		

== Europe ==
Host country	Host city	Mission	Concurrent accreditation	Ref.
Austria	Vienna	Embassy	Countries: Croatia; Georgia; Slovakia; Slovenia; International Organizations: United Nations	
Belgium	Brussels	Embassy	Countries: Luxembourg; Netherlands; International Organizations: European Union; Organisation for the Prohibition of Chemical Weapons	
France	Paris	Embassy	Countries: Portugal; Spain; International Organizations: UNESCO	
Germany	Embassy	Embassy	Countries: Bulgaria; Czechia; Poland; Romania	
Hungary	Budapest	Embassy	Countries: Albania; Bosnia and Herzegovina; Montenegro; North Macedonia; Serbia	
Russia	Moscow	Embassy	Countries: Armenia; Azerbaijan; Belarus	
Sweden	Stockholm	Embassy	Countries: Denmark; Estonia; Finland; Latvia; Lithuania; Norway	
United Kingdom	London	Embassy	Countries: Iceland; Ireland	

== Oceania ==
Host country	Host city	Mission	Concurrent accreditation	Ref.
Australia	Canberra	Embassy	Countries: New Zealand	

== Multilateral organisations ==
Organization	Host city	Host country	Mission	Concurrent accreditation	Ref.
Association of Southeast Asian Nations	Jakarta	Indonesia	Permanent Mission		
United Nations	New York City	United States	Permanent Mission	Countries: Guatemala	
United Nations	Geneva	Switzerland	Permanent Mission	Countries: Cyprus; Greece; Italy; Liechtenstein; Malta; San Marino; Switzerland; Turkey	

== Gallery ==
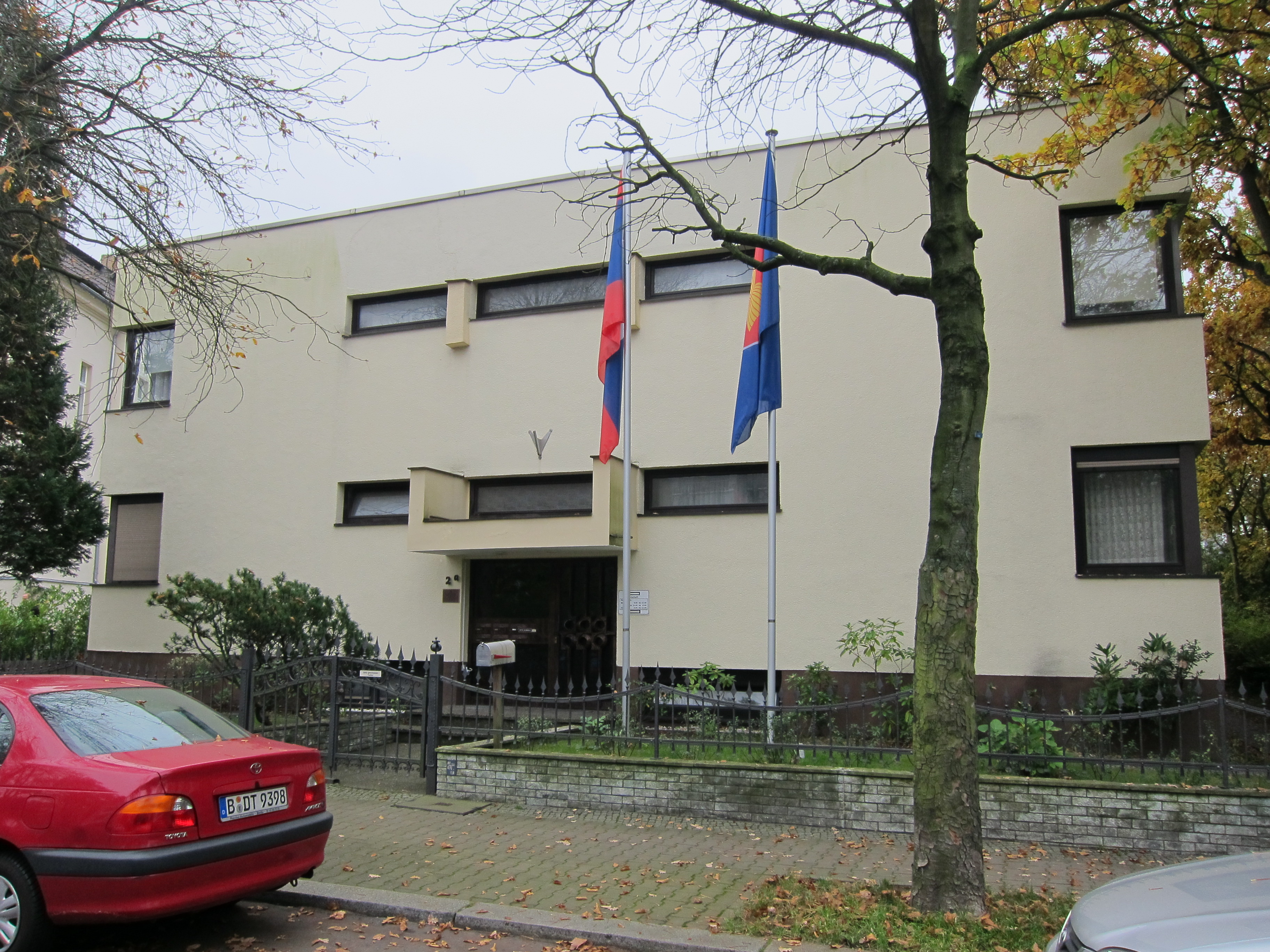
Embassy in Berlin

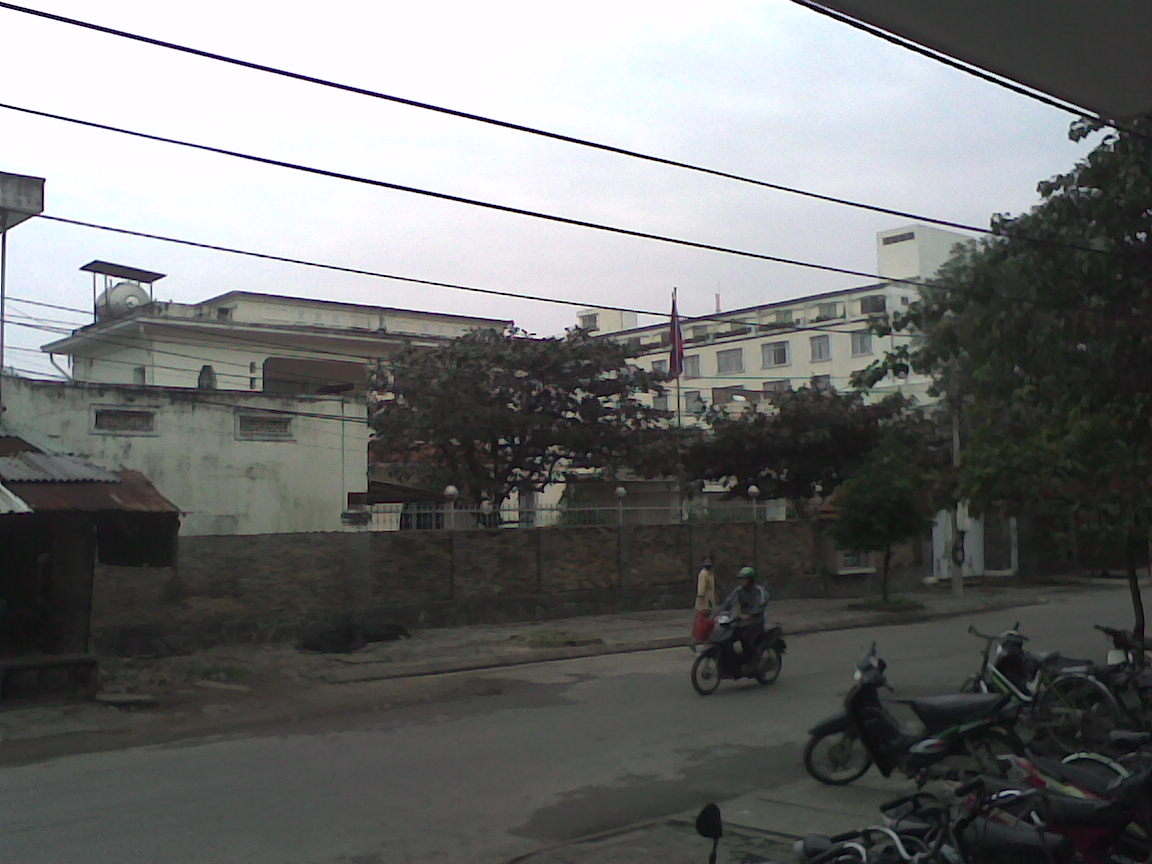
Consulate-General in Da Nang

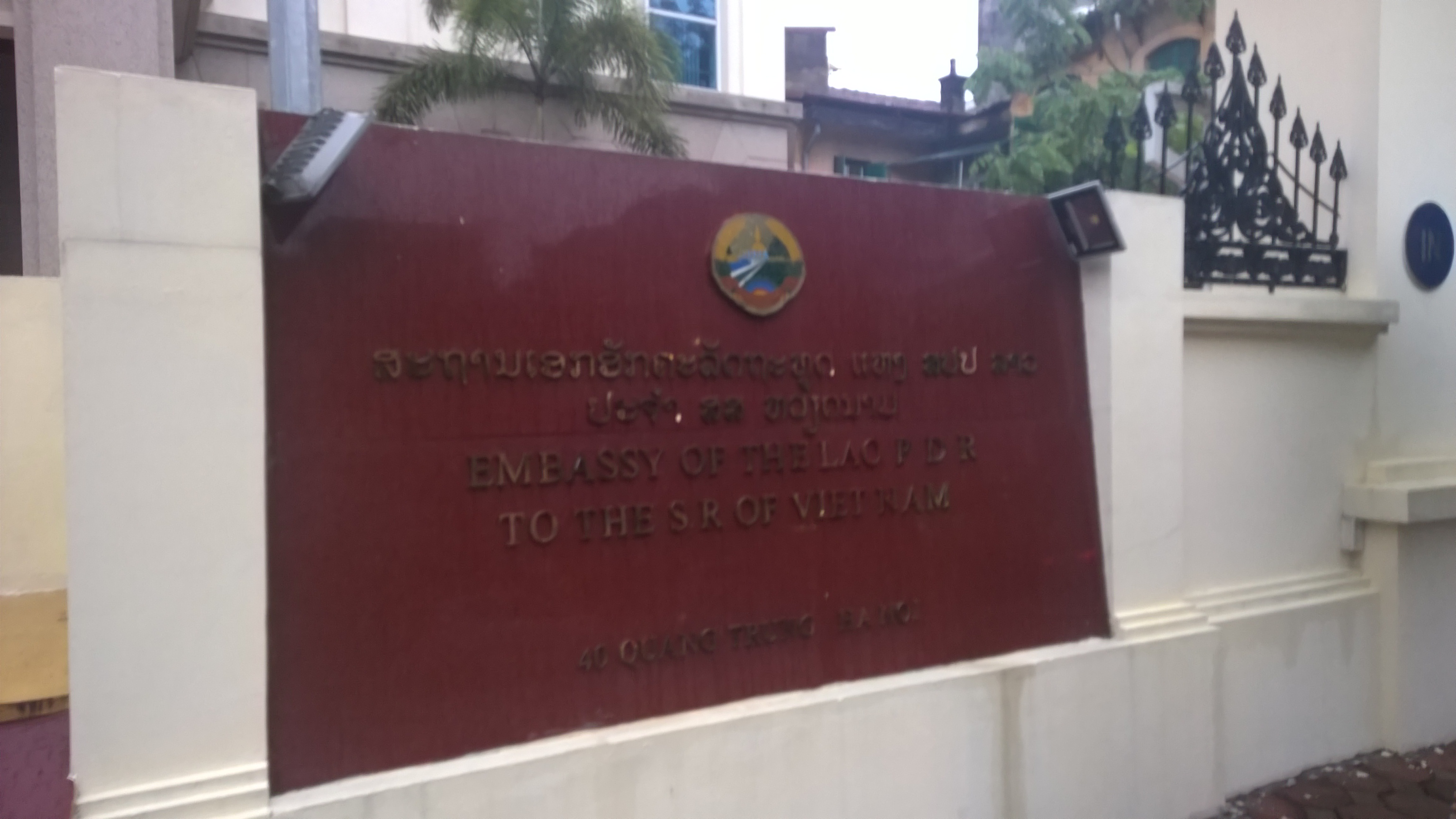
Embassy in Hanoi

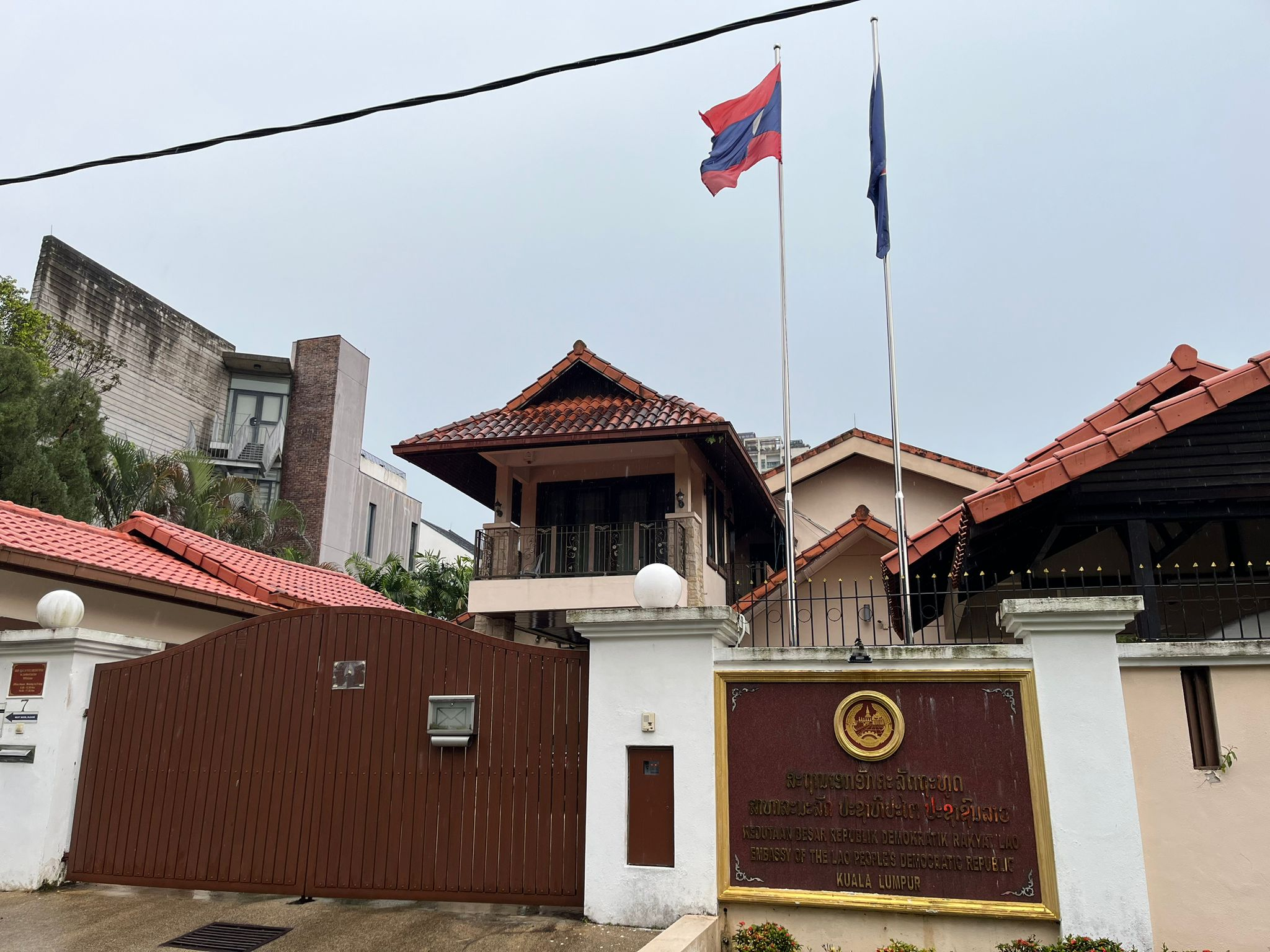
Embassy in Kuala Lumpur

Building hosting the Embassy in Manila

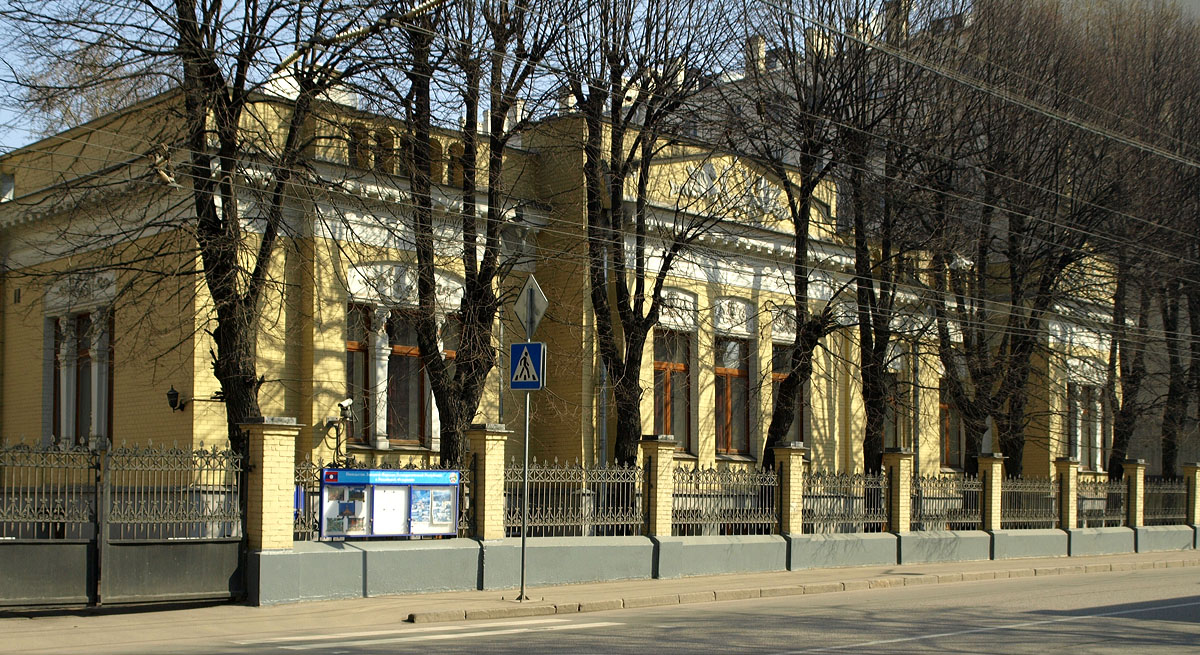
Embassy in Moscow

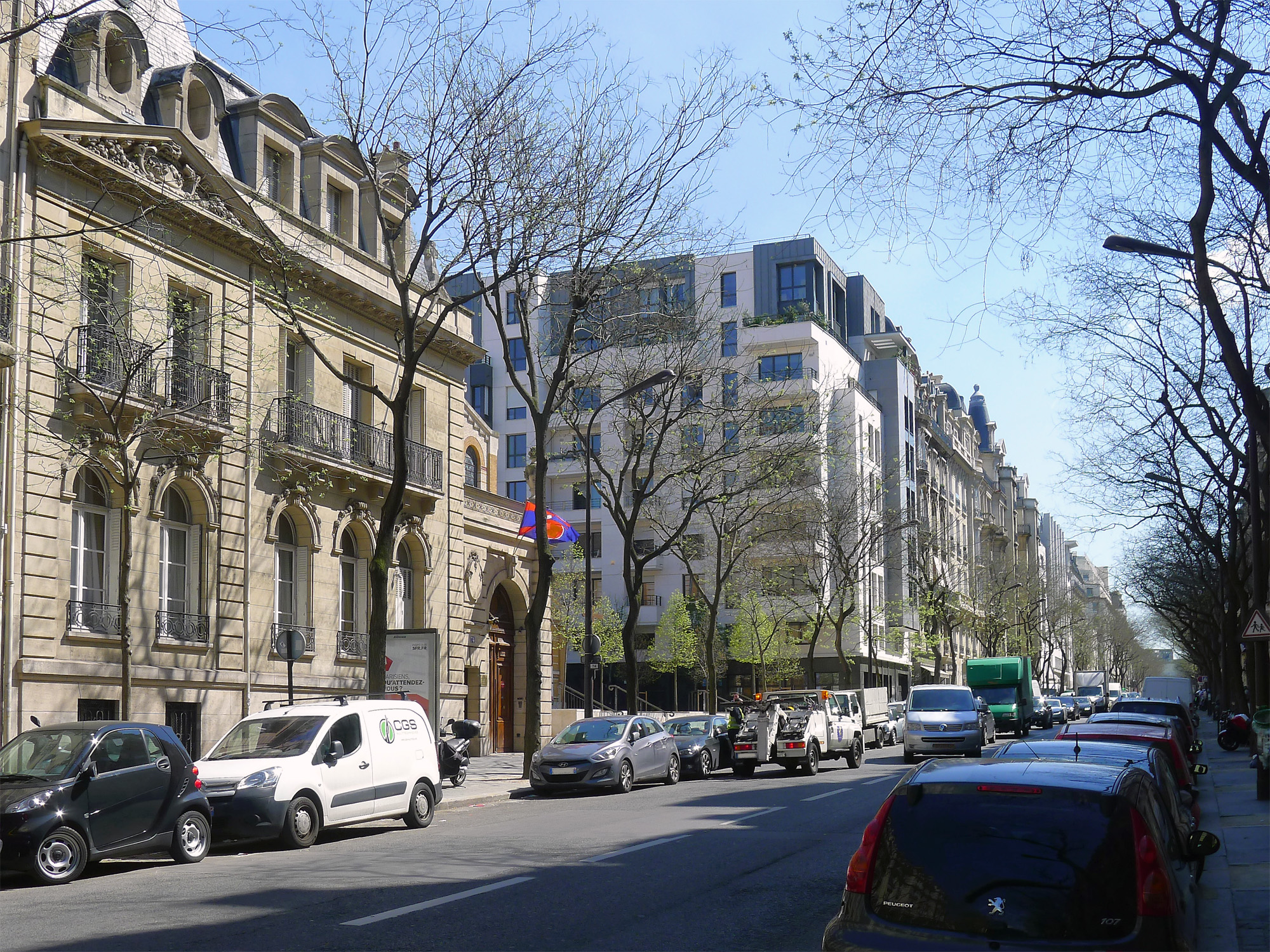
Embassy in Paris

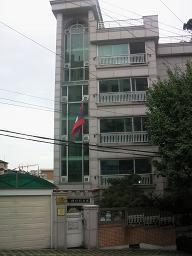
Embassy in Seoul

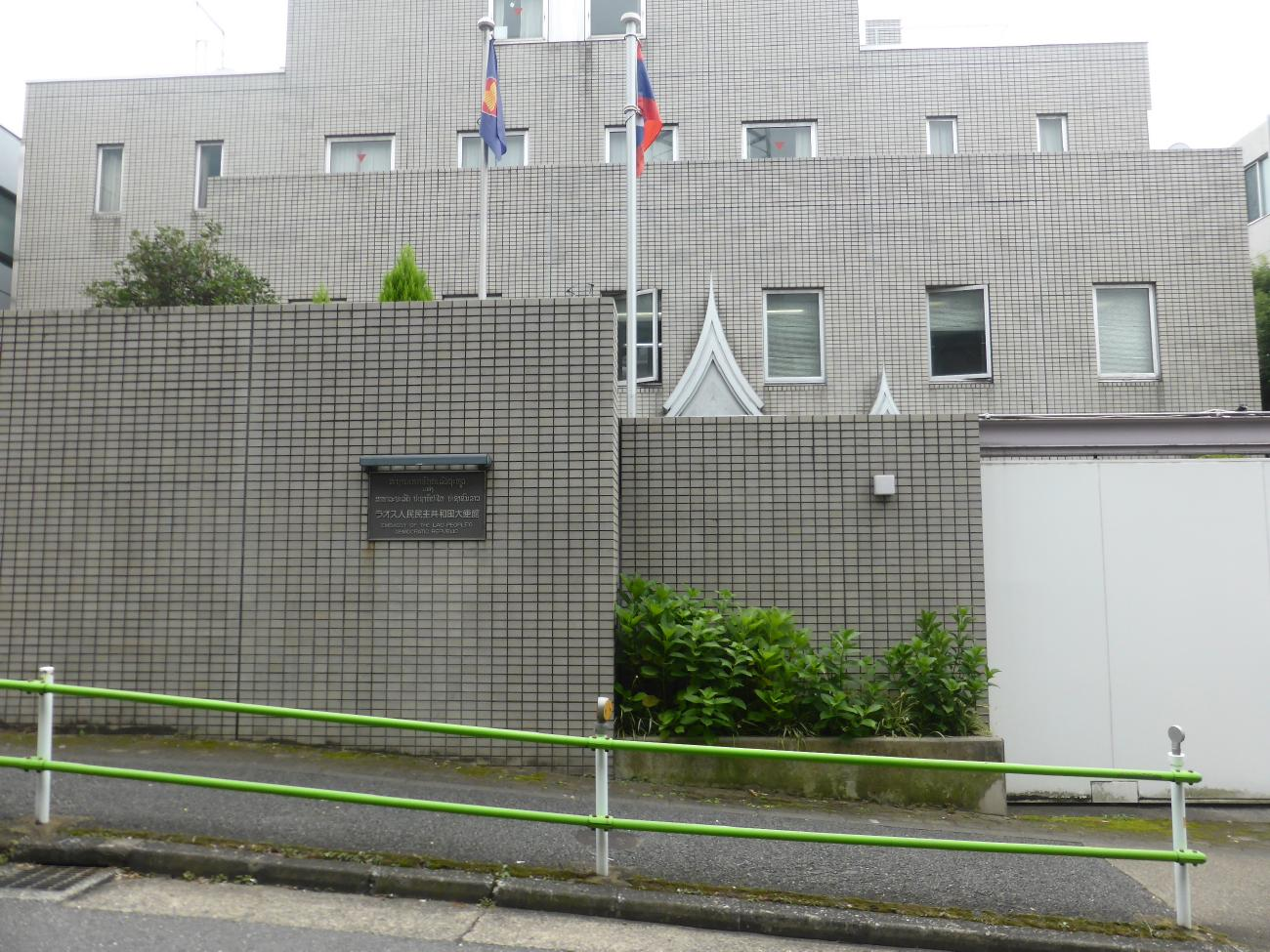
Embassy in Tokyo

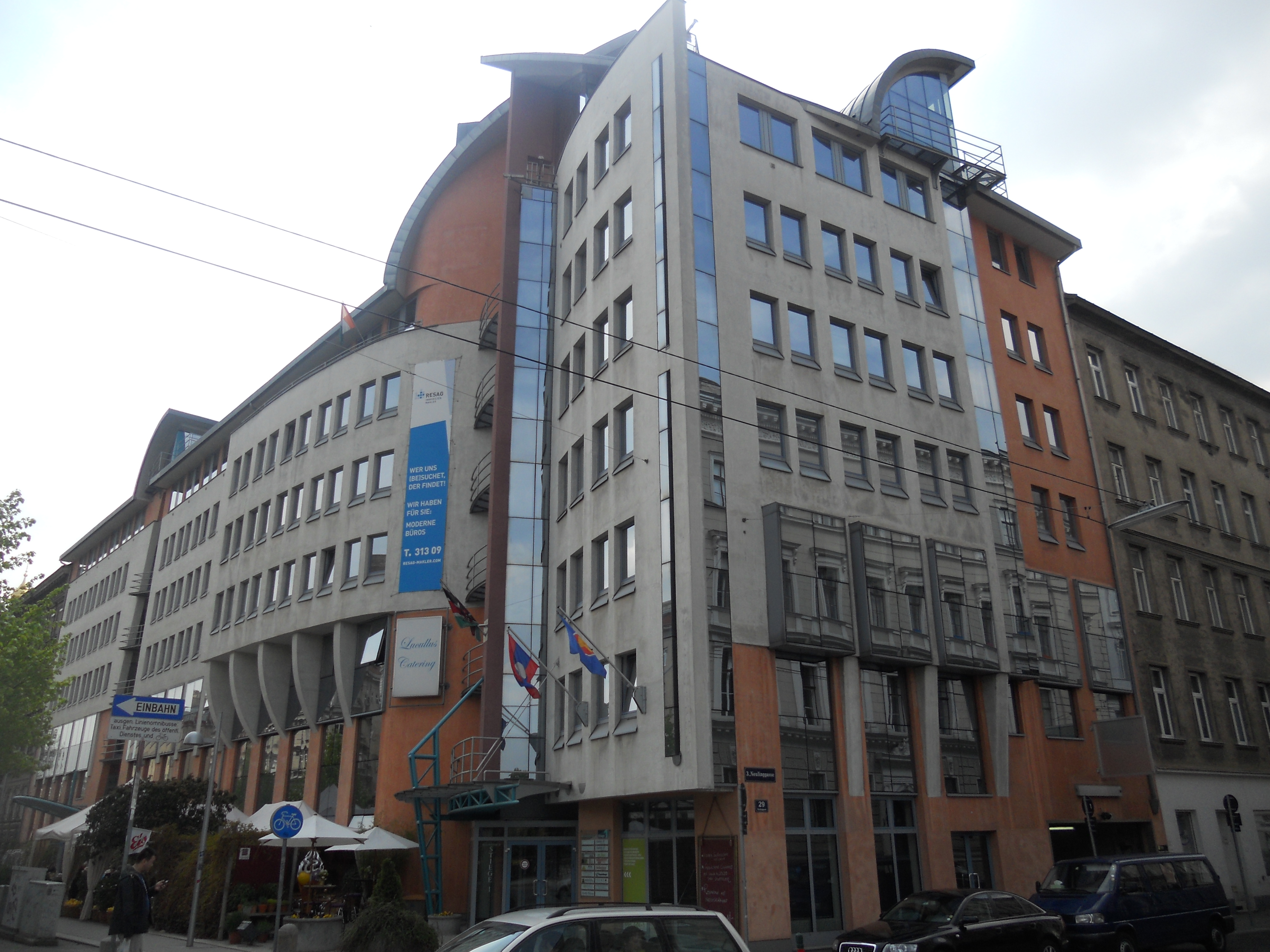
Embassy in Vienna

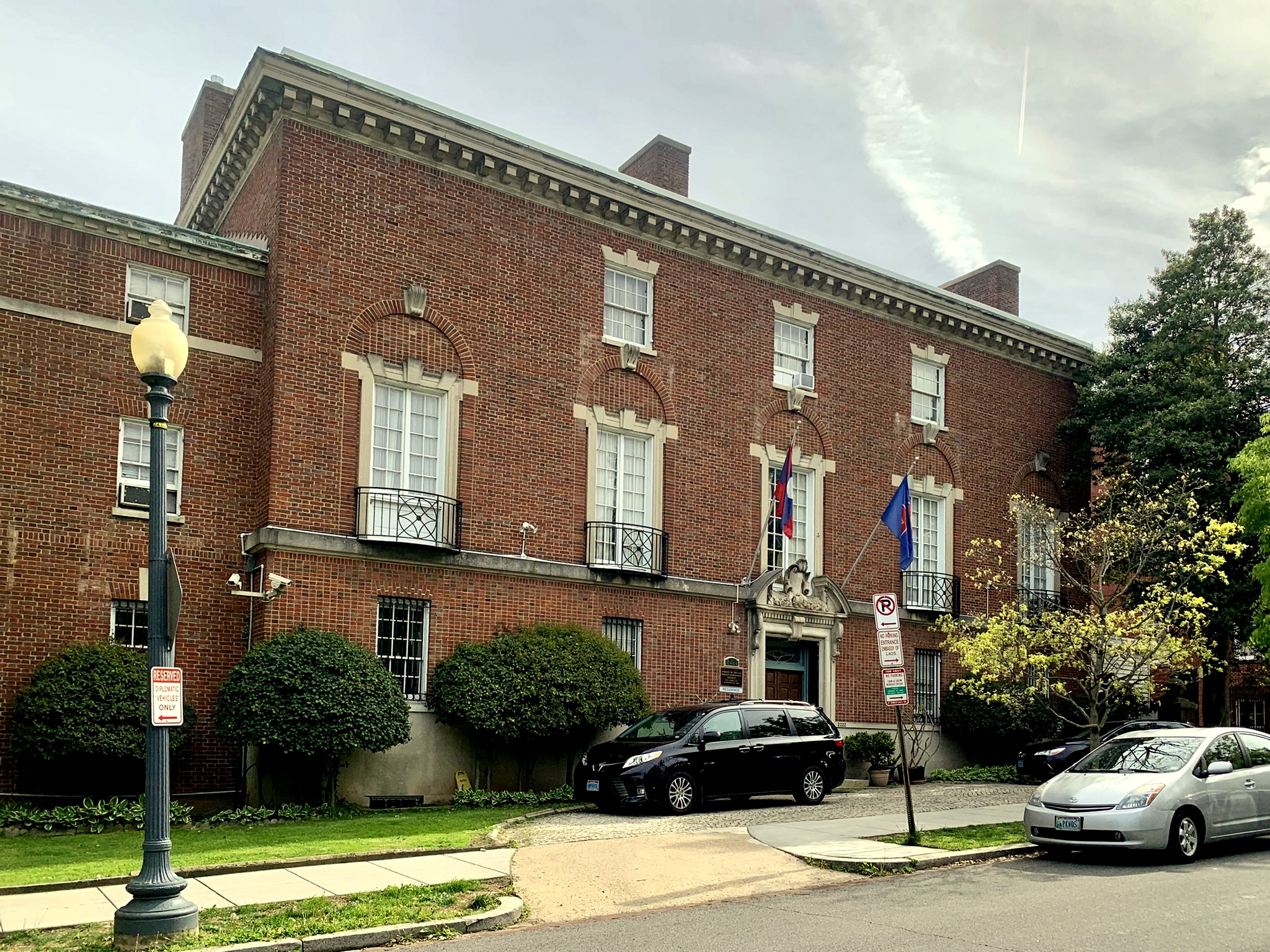
Embassy in Washington D.C.

== See also ==
- Foreign relations of Laos
- List of diplomatic missions in Laos
- Visa policy of Laos
