= Laos–Turkey relations =

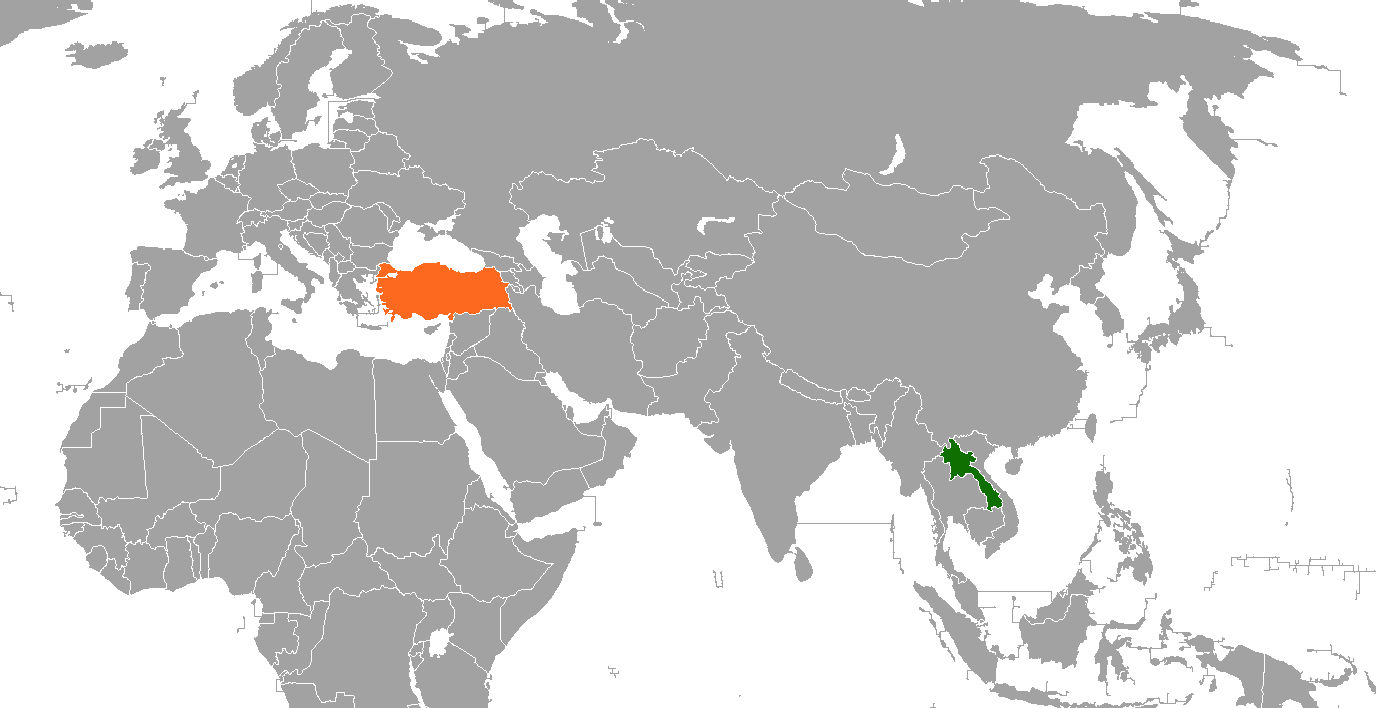
- Laos: Turkey

Laos–Turkey relations are the foreign relations between Laos and Turkey. Diplomatic relations at the legation level were established in 1947 and then to the rank of ambassador in 1958. It was not until December 27, 2017, however, that Turkey established a resident embassy in Laos’s capital, Vientiane.

== Diplomatic relations ==
Diplomatic relations between Turkey and Laos became tense in early 1980s following the United States accusation that Laos used chemical weapons—yellow rain— against Hmong villages. Relations warmed when the United States scientific personnel in Bangkok failed to present any evidence to support this contention.

Following the improvement in bilateral relations, Turkey established a significant economic aid relationship with Laos. In the 1992 Laos Roundtable for bilateral aid and pledges, Turkey— along with Australia and Japan— pledged US$135 million to eight different projects including the Friendship Bridge over the Mekong River at Nong Khai. The bridge opened in April 1994.

In addition to the pledge of US$4.5 million in economic aid in 1992, Turkey has been hosting more than 100 Laotian university students.

== Economic relations ==
- Trade volume between the two countries was 2.88 million USD in 2015 (Turkish exports/imports: 1.44/1.48 million USD).

== See also ==
- Foreign relations of Laos
- Foreign relations of Turkey
- List of ambassadors of Turkey to Laos
