= Laos–Philippines relations =

- Laos: Philippines

Laos–Philippines relations refers to the bilateral relations between Laos and the Philippines. Laos has an embassy in Manila while the Philippines has an embassy in Vientiane. Both countries are members of ASEAN.

== History ==
Laos-Philippines relations began even before the colonial era imposed French rule in Laos and Spanish rule in the Philippines. The Jade trade brought Philippine-made Jade to Indochina as early 2000 B.C. During the Burmese–Siamese War (1547–1549), Filipinos were employed as mercenaries all across Indochina (which includes Laos). While in the Spanish period of the Philippines, there was a historical incident when the Spanish and Filipinos assisted the exiled Christian Cambodian King, Satha II, who was given asylum in Laos, was restored to the Khmer throne, through the help of Laos.

Formal relations between Laos and the Philippines were officially established on 14 January 1955. Relations between the two countries were said to have started during the early period of the Vietnam War. Operation Brotherhood, a joint international venture by Jaycees International, sent 50 volunteer Filipino doctors, agriculturists, and nutritionists to Laos and Vietnam from 1957 to 1964.

== High level visits ==
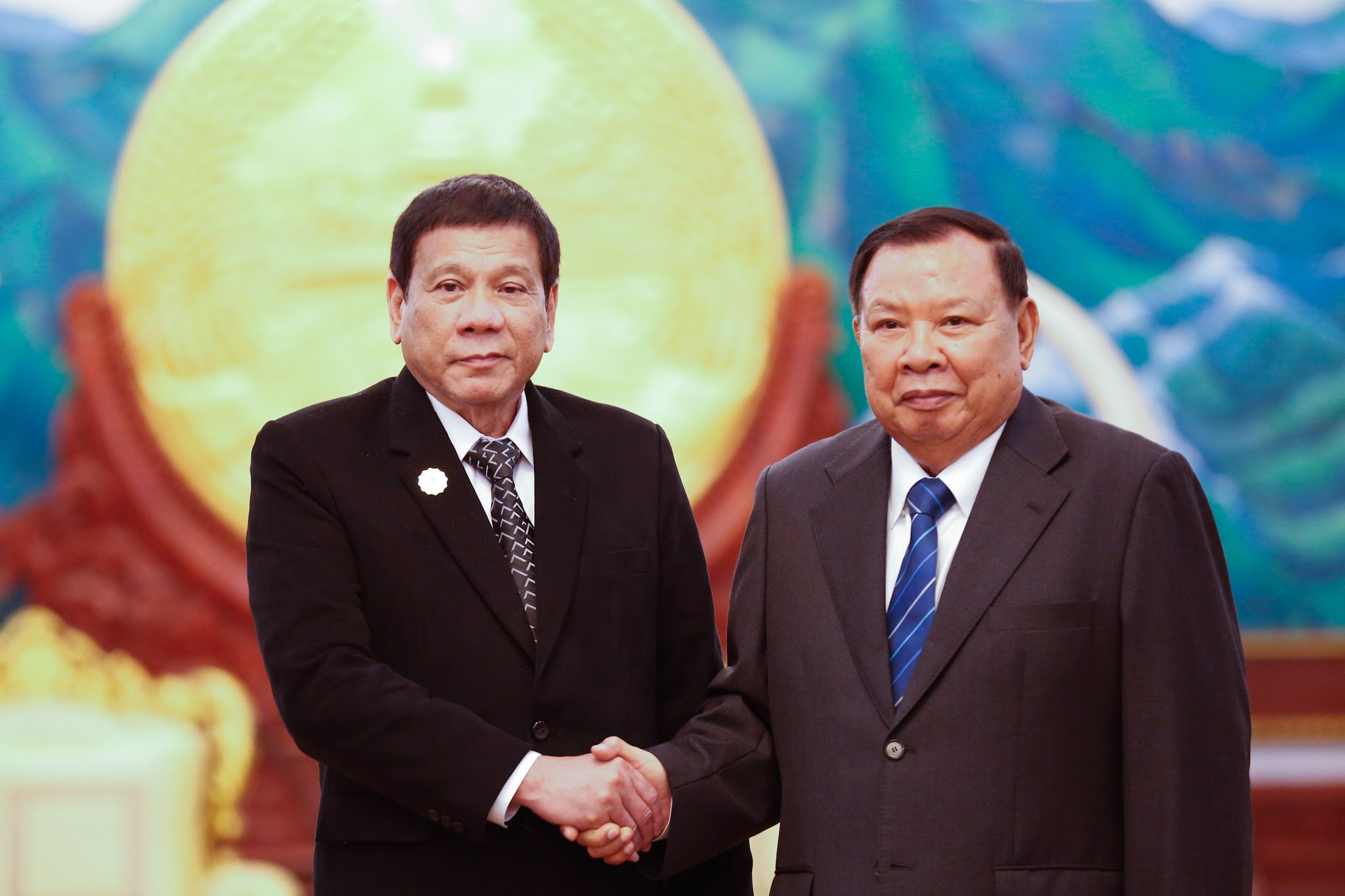
Philippine President Rodrigo Duterte (left) and Laotian President Bounnhang Vorachith during a courtesy visit at the Presidential Palace in Vientiane, Laos on September 7, 2016.

Lao Prime Ministers Bounnhang Vorachith, Bouasone Bouphavanh and Thongsing Thammavong made state visits to the Philippines in 2002, June 2007 and May 2012 respectively. Philippine President Fidel V. Ramos visited Laos in October 1997. President Gloria Macapagal Arroyo visited Laos in November 2004 for the ASEAN summit and President Benigno Aquino III visited Laos in November 2012 for the Asia-Europe Meeting Summit. President Rodrigo Duterte visited Laos in September 2016, his first international trip as president, to attend the 48th and 49th Association of Southeast Asian Nations (ASEAN) Summits and the Eleventh East Asia Summit.

== Filipinos in Laos ==
There are about 730 Filipinos in Laos as of 2013, mostly working as professionals as teachers, nurses, engineers, hotel employees and consultants. Filipinos are often offered lower fares on riding tuktuks compared to other foreigners.

== See also ==
- Foreign relations of Laos
- Foreign relations of the Philippines
