= Laos–South Korea relations =

- South Korea: Laos

Laos–South Korea relations refer to the bilateral relations between Laos and South Korea. Formal diplomatic relations between the two countries began in 1974. After the Pathet Lao overthrew the Kingdom of Laos and established the Lao People's Democratic Republic, relations were severed for a time, and ties with South Korea were highly unfriendly. Diplomatic relations were restored in 1995, after which relations have developed positively. In some cases, countries that have established diplomatic relations with Laos but do not have an embassy there appoint their ambassador in South Korea as a non-resident ambassador to Laos.

== Political exchanges ==
The Kingdom of Laos and South Korea established ambassador-level diplomatic relations on 22 June 1974. In August of the same year, South Korea opened its embassy in Laos, which had been established in 1973. However, on 24 July 1975, South Korea, following an anti-communist policy, severed diplomatic relations with Laos after the Pathet Lao took control. On 2 December 1975, Souphanouvong and others overthrew the Kingdom of Laos during the Laotian Civil War and established the communist Lao People's Democratic Republic, subsequently strengthening diplomatic ties with North Korea, which shared a similar ideology. During the following decade, relations between South Korea and Laos remained tense and hostile.

The situation began to improve as Laos implemented its comprehensive reform policies, and South Korean President Roh Tae-woo pursued the Nordpolitik in 1988 to develop diplomatic relations with socialist countries. Subsequently, both sides initiated unofficial academic and sports exchanges. Laos also sent a delegation to participate in the Summer Olympics held in Seoul that year. Diplomatic relations were formally restored on 25 October 1995, and the South Korean government reopened its embassy in Vientiane the following year.

Since the restoration of diplomatic relations, bilateral ties have steadily strengthened. Laotian President Choummaly Sayasone, Prime Ministers Thongsing Thammavong and Thongloun Sisoulith, and National Assembly President Pany Yathotou have all visited South Korea. South Korean Presidents Park Geun-hye and Moon Jae-in have also visited Laos during their respective terms.

== See also ==
- Foreign relations of Laos
- Foreign relations of South Korea
