= Laos–United Kingdom relations =

- Laos: United Kingdom

Diplomatic mission
- Embassy of Laos, London: Embassy of the United Kingdom, Vientiane

Laos–United Kingdom relations encompass the diplomatic, economic, and historical interactions between the Laos People's Democratic Republic and the United Kingdom of Great Britain and Northern Ireland. Laos and the United Kingdom established diplomatic relations on 5 September 1955.

Both countries share common membership of the United Nations, and the World Trade Organization. Bilaterally the two countries have an Investment Agreement.

== Diplomatic missions ==
- Laos maintains an embassy in London.
- The UK is accredited to Laos through its embassy in Vientiane.

== See also ==
- Foreign relations of Laos
- Foreign relations of the United Kingdom
