= Laos–Myanmar border =

International border

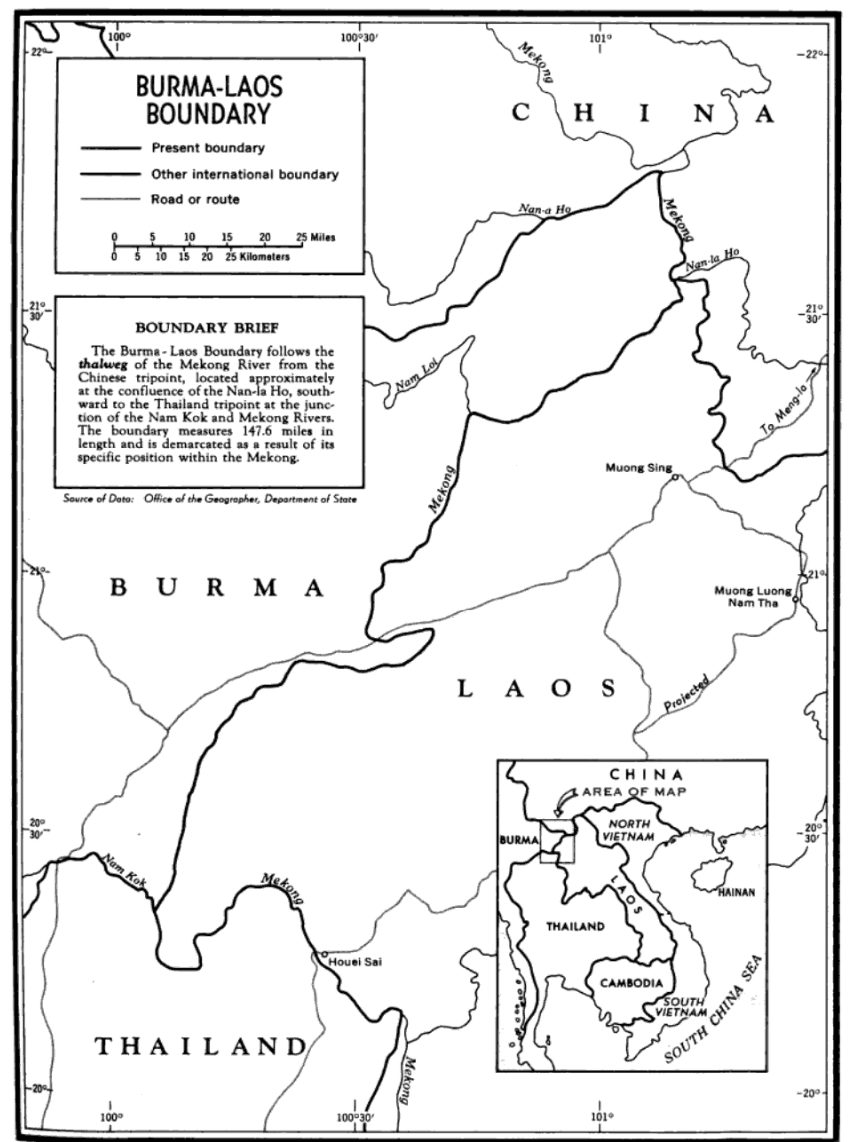
Map of the Laos-Myanmar border

The Laos–Myanmar border is the international border between the territory of Laos and Myanmar (formerly Burma). The border is 148 mi (238 km) in length and runs entirely along the Mekong River from the tripoint with China in the north to the tripoint with Thailand in the south.

== Description ==
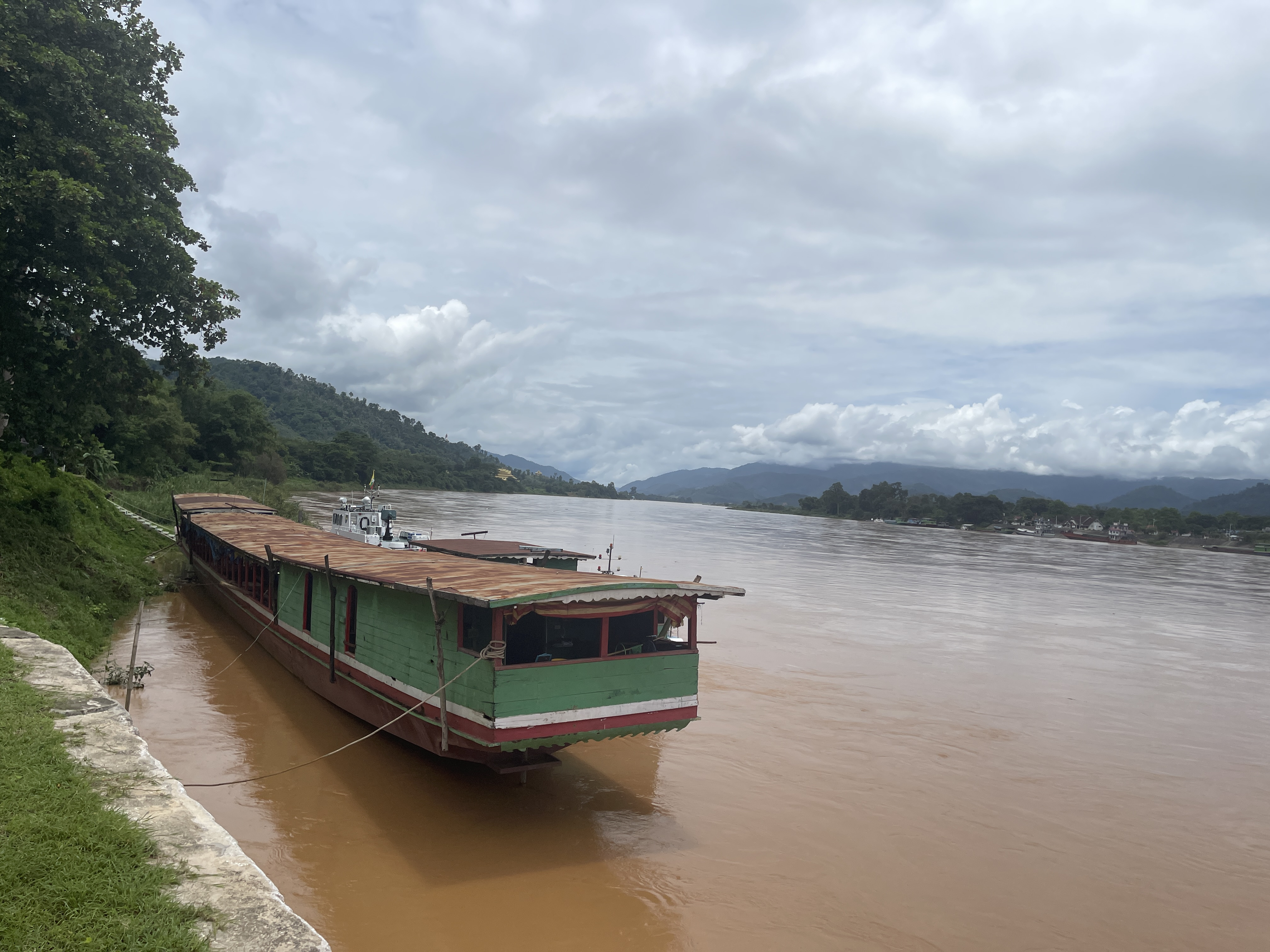
Mekong River from Wan Pong, Tachileik Township on the Laos-Myanmar border

The border starts in the north at the tripoint with China at the confluence of the Nanla River with the Mekong, and then proceeds in a south-westerly direction down to the tripoint with Thailand at the confluence with the Kok River, save for an eastwards protrusion of the Mekong about halfway along the frontier.

== History ==
The Mekong has historically served as a natural frontier between various kingdoms and people groups in the region. Its use as the modern boundary between Laos and Myanmar stems from the colonial period in the 19th century. From the 1860s France began establishing a presence in the region, initially in modern Cambodia and Vietnam, and the colony of French Indochina was created in 1887. Laos was then added to the colony in 1893 following the Franco-Siamese crisis. Meanwhile Britain began occupying Myanmar (then referred to as Burma), gradually incorporating it into British India. On 15 January 1896 Britain and France agreed that the boundary between their two colonies would run along the Mekong.

In 1941, following Japan's invasion of Burma, parts of Burma were ceded to Siam as the Saharat Thai Doem territory, thereby ending the existence of the Laos-Myanmar boundary, however these areas were returned to Burma in 1946 following Japan's defeat and the boundary restored. In 1937 Burma had been separated from India and became a separate British colony, gaining full independence in 1948. Laos obtained a partial independence from France in 1949, gaining complete independence in 1953, with the boundary then becoming one between two sovereign states. The border region became unstable in the subsequent decades, with various armed groups operating here, such as the Chinese Kuomintang, Pathet Lao and various Shan militias. The border is nowadays more peaceful - a joint demarcation survey of the border was conducted in June 1993, and a Friendship Bridge across it was built in 2015.

== Border crossings ==
There is one main crossing at the Friendship Bridge at Wan Pong-Kyainglap, linking Xieng Kok in Laos with Kyainglap in Myanmar, which opened on 20 November 2018.

== See also ==
- Laos–Myanmar relations
