= Laotian passport =

Travel document

- The front cover of an ordinary Laotian passport
- Type: Passport
- Issued by: (Laos) Ministry of Foreign Affairs
- First issued: 30 June 2016 (biometric passport)
- Purpose: Identification
- Eligibility: Laotian citizenship
- Expiration: 10 years after acquisition

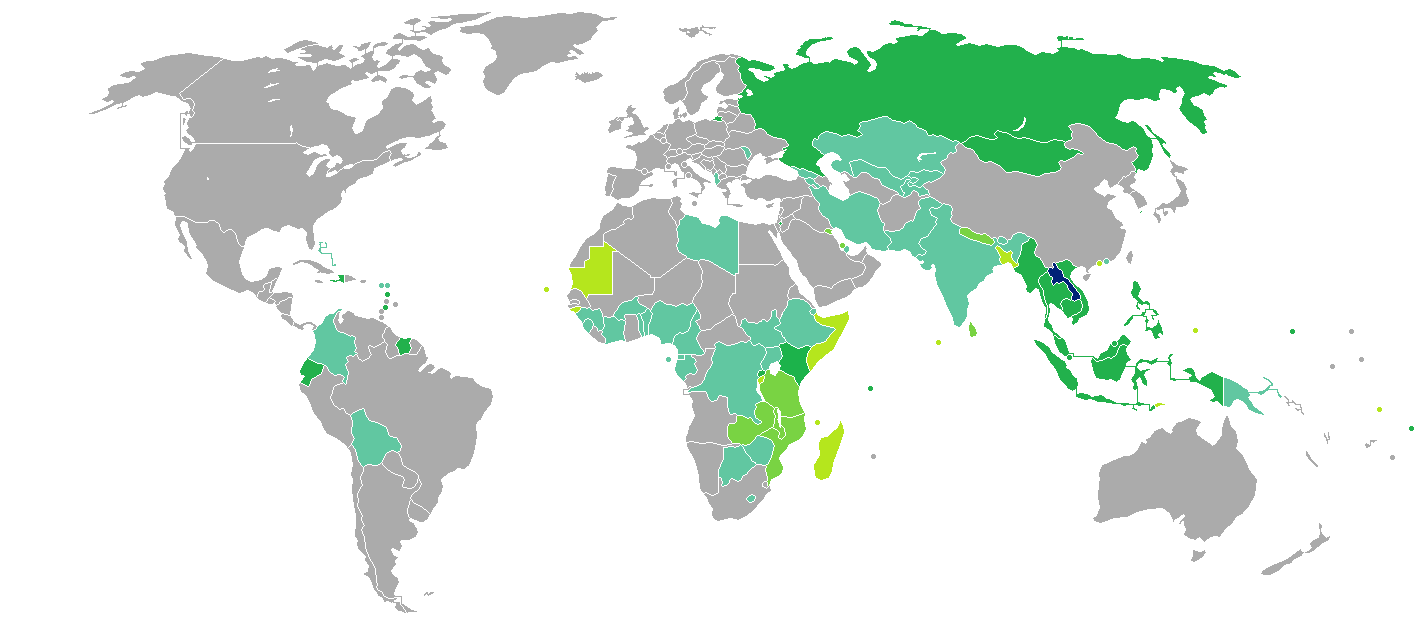
Visa-free & Visa-on-arrival countries for holders of the Laotian passport

Laotian passports are issued to citizens of Laos by Consular Department within the Ministry of Foreign Affairs to travel internationally. The biometric passport has been issued since 30 June 2016.

As of 2024, the Laotian passport is ranked as the 80th most powerful, offering its holders an access to 20 countries visa-free and 37 countries through visa on arrival.

== Physical appearance ==
=== Front Cover ===
The Lao ordinary passport cover is dark blue in colour with the Emblem of Laos emblazoned in its centre. The word "ສາທາລະນະລັດ ປະຊາທິປະໄຕ ປະຊາຊົນລາວ" (English: Lao People's Democratic Republic and French: République Démocratique Populaire Lao) is inscribed on the top of the coat of arms while the word passport (in Lao, English and French) is inscribed below. The official and diplomatic passports are green and burgundy in colour respectively. The Lao ordinary passport has 32 pages excluding the cover and is valid to travel to all countries.

=== Passport note ===
"ໃນນາມ ລັດຖະບານ ແຫ່ງ ສາທາລະນະລັດ ປະຊາທິປະໄຕ ປະຊາຊົນລາວ ກະຊວງການຕ່າງປະເທດ ຂໍໃຫ້ເຈົ້າໜ້າທີ່ ທີ່ກ່ຽວຂ້ອງຈົ່ງໃຫ້ອຳນວຍຄວາມສະດວກ ໃນການໄປມາ ແກ່ຜູ້ຖືໜັງສືຜ່ານແດນສະບັບນີ້ ແລະ ໃຫ້ຄວາມຊ່ວຍເຫຼືອຄຸ້ມຄອງໃນຄາວຈຳເປັນອີກດ້ວຍ."

"Au nom du Gouvernement de la République Démocratique Populaire Lao, le Ministère des Affaires étrangères prie les autorités compétentes de laisser passer librement le titulaire de ce passeport, et de lui donner aide et protection en cas de besoin."

"In the name of the Government of the Lao People's Democratic Republic, the Ministry of Foreign Affairs requests all relevant authorities to whom it may concern to allow the bearer to pass freely, and to afford the bearer any such assistance and protection as maybe necessary."

=== Information page ===
- Photograph of the bearer
- Type
- Code of Issuing State (LAO)
- Passport number
- Name and Surname
- Nationality (Lao)
- Date of Birth
- Sex
- Place of Birth
- Date of issue
- Date of expiry
- Name in Lao
- Emergency contact detail
- Bearer signature
- Issuing authority

== See also ==
- List of passports
- Visa requirements for Laotian citizens
