= List of ambassadors of Turkey to Laos =

The ambassador of Turkey to Laos is the official representative of the president and the government of the Republic of Turkey to the president and government of the Laos.

== List of ambassadors ==
Ambassador	Term start	Term end	Ref.
Ahmet İdem Akay	26 December 2017	23 July 2020	
Orhan Işık	23 July 2020	Present	

== See also ==
- Laos–Turkey relations
