= Laos–Pakistan relations =

Bilateral relations of Pakistan and Laos

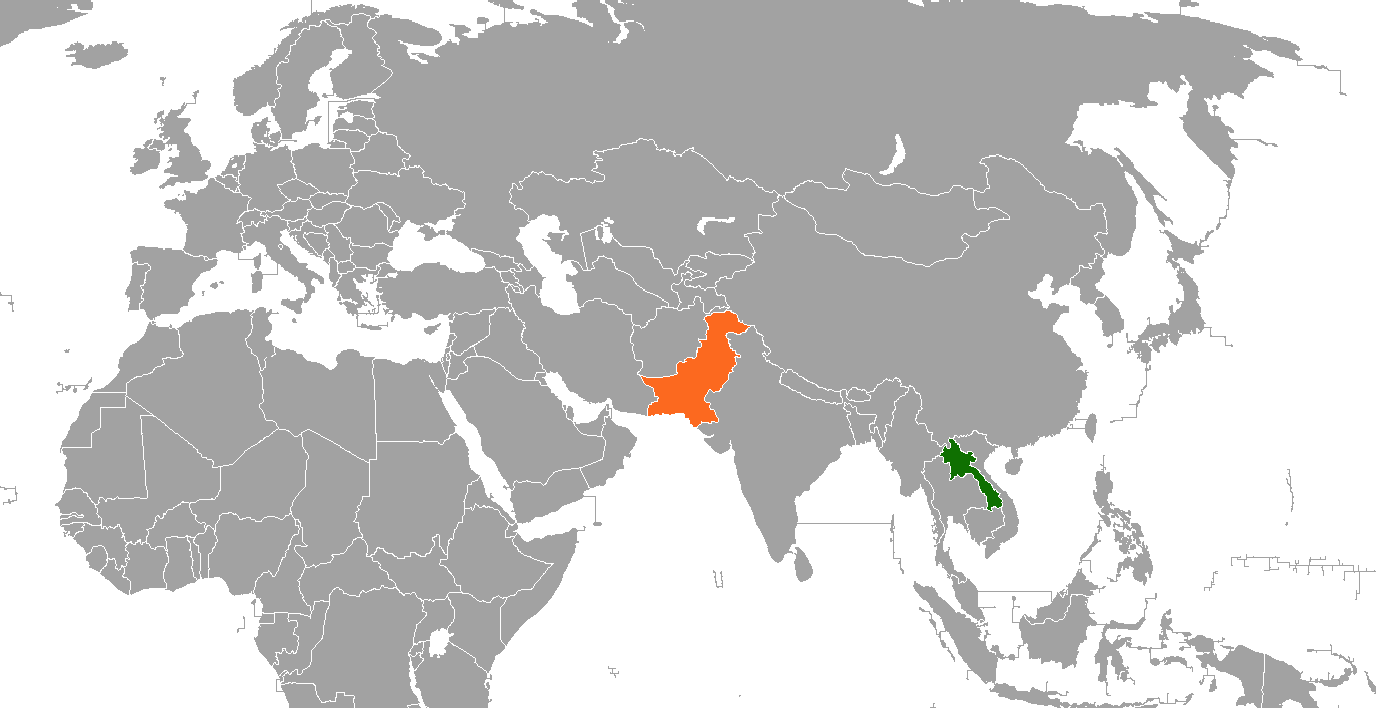
- Laos: Pakistan

Laos–Pakistan relations are the bilateral relations between Laos and Pakistan. Both countries are members of the Non-Aligned Movement and established diplomatic ties on 15 July 1965. Pakistan's Embassy in Hanoi, Vietnam, is currently accredited to Laos.

== High level visits ==
In 2004, Pakistani Prime Minister Zafarullah Jamali visited Laos at the invitation of Lao Prime Minister Bounnhang Vorachith. Both countries reaffirmed their commitment to implementing the purpose and principles of the UN charter in their bilateral relations and to contributing to the peaceful settlement of conflicts and disputes around the globe. Pakistani Prime Minister Raja Pervez Ashraf visited Laos in 2012 to attend the ASEM meeting.

== Trade ==
The total bilateral trade amounted to 948,734 US Dollar during the fiscal year 2021–2022. Major traded items include appliances, paper products, and medical supplies.

== Diplomatic missions ==
- Laos is represented in Pakistan through its embassy in Beijing.
- Pakistan is represented in Laos through its embassy in Hanoi.

== See also ==
- Foreign relations of Laos
- Foreign relations of Pakistan
