= 1987 Vientiane bombing =

Bombing attack in Vientiane, Laos

1987 Vientiane Bombing
- Location: Vientiane, Laos
- Date: 9 March, 1987; 6 A.M.
- Target: Soviet cultural center
- Attack type: Bombing
- Deaths: 1
- Injuries: 1
- Motive: Assassination of Eduard A. Shevardnadze

The 1987 Vientiane bombing was an attack that occurred on March 9, 1987, at 6 A.M. at the Soviet cultural center in Vientiane, Laos. The attack is believed to have been an assassination attempt on Eduard A. Shevardnadze, who was supposed to arrive on a diplomatic meeting later that day. Officials said a Laotian guard was killed and another wounded by the explosion, while the three-story building sustained only minor damages.

== Reactions ==
- Soviet Union - Soon after the event, Soviet spokesman Gennady I. Gerasimov told a news briefing: “We only have quite preliminary information that there was an explosion in the center of the city. We have no information as to causes and results.” Shevardnadze visited the city despite the bomb.
- Laos - Phanethong Phommahaxay, acting head of the Laotian Foreign Ministry’s press department, charged that the Thailand government sent an armed exile to carry out the attack.
