= List of ambassadors of Israel to Laos =

This is a list of ambassadors of Israel to the Lao People's Democratic Republic.

== List of ambassadors ==
- Minister Daniel Lewin (diplomat) (Non-Resident, Naypyitaw) 1957–1960
- Ambassador Mordecai Kidron (Non-Resident, Bangkok) 1958–1963
- Shimon Avimor (Non-Resident, Phnom Penh) 1972–1975
- Nadav Eshcar (Non-Resident, Hanoi) 2017–present
