= Laos–Malaysia relations =

- Laos: Malaysia

Laos–Malaysia relations are foreign relations between Laos and Malaysia. Both countries are the members of ASEAN.

== History ==
During the collapse of the Communist Bloc, the Soviet Union could no longer afford aid for the development of Laos. This made Laos seek aid from other countries to help develop their country and has led the country to adopt a neutral foreign policy. When this policy of neutrality was adopted, relations with Malaysia were established. The relations has been supported by the past Malaysian King Tuanku Mizan Zainal Abidin.

On 29 October 2001, Malaysian Prime Minister Mahathir Mohamad said Malaysia supports Laos' membership in the World Trade Organisation.

== Economic relations ==
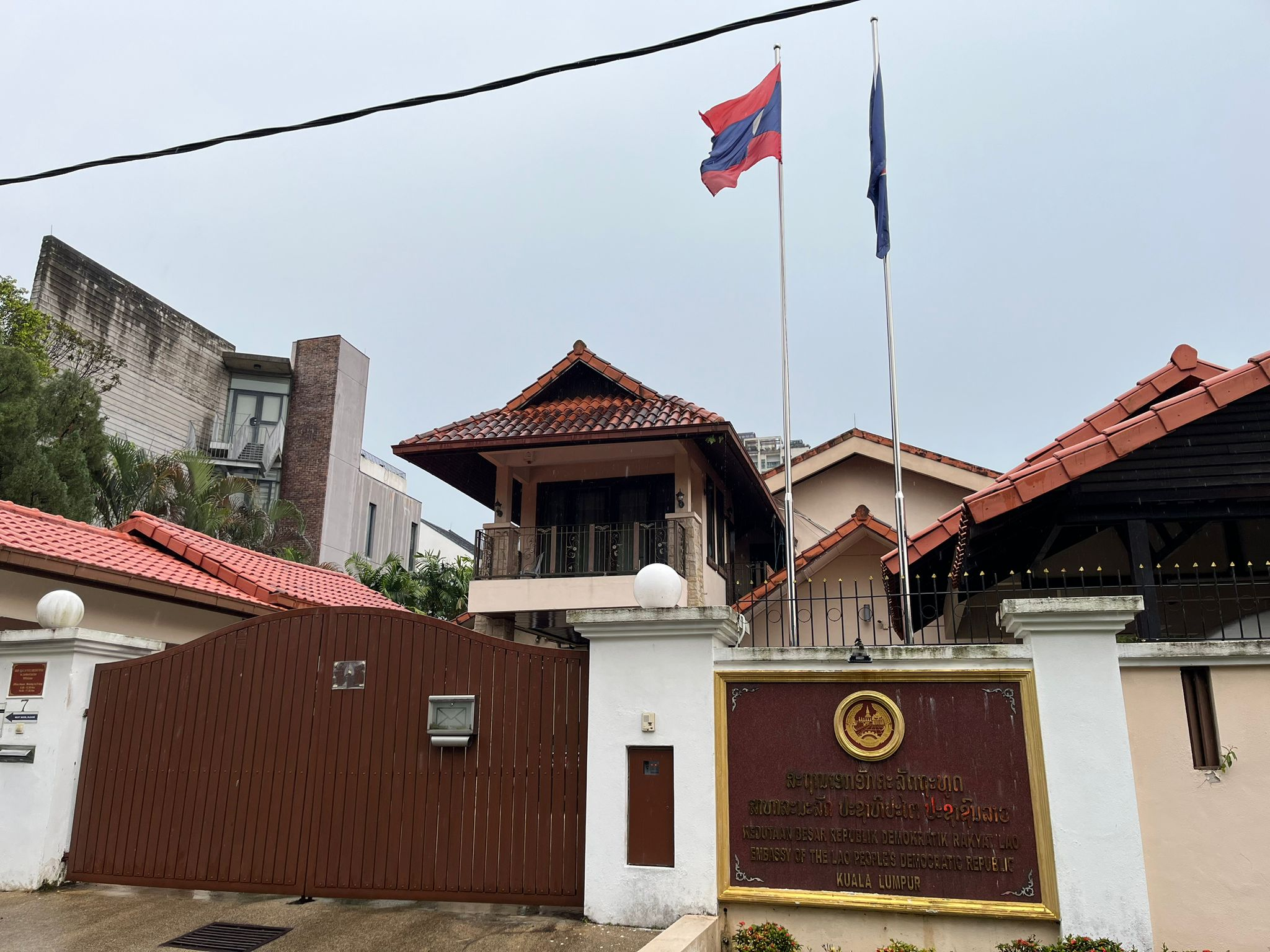
Embassy of Laos in Kuala Lumpur

In 2003, the trade between the two countries were very small with the valued at only US$2.4 million but increase to US$2.7 million in 2004. While in 2009, Malaysia's exported to Laos has reached US$7.4 million and the Malaysian investment in the country has reached US$150 million. Both countries also has signed various agreements to provide for the expanding of bilateral relations such as the Bilateral Trade Agreement, Tourism Agreement. Investment Guarantee Agreement, Air Services Agreement and the Economic, Scientific and Technical Cooperation Agreement. In 2010, Malaysia ranks ninth in the list of largest foreign investors in Laos. By 2015, Malaysia is the second largest investor after Vietnam with a total investment of $430 million. In 2017, the two countries establish a joint committee on science, technology and innovation (STI) co-operation, with Malaysian companies are encouraged to invest more in Laos.
