= Visa policy of Laos =

Policy on permits required to enter Laos

Visitors to Laos must obtain a visa from one of the Laotian diplomatic missions unless they are citizens from one of the visa-exempt countries or citizens eligible for a visa on arrival or an e-Visa. All visitors must hold a passport valid for 6 months.

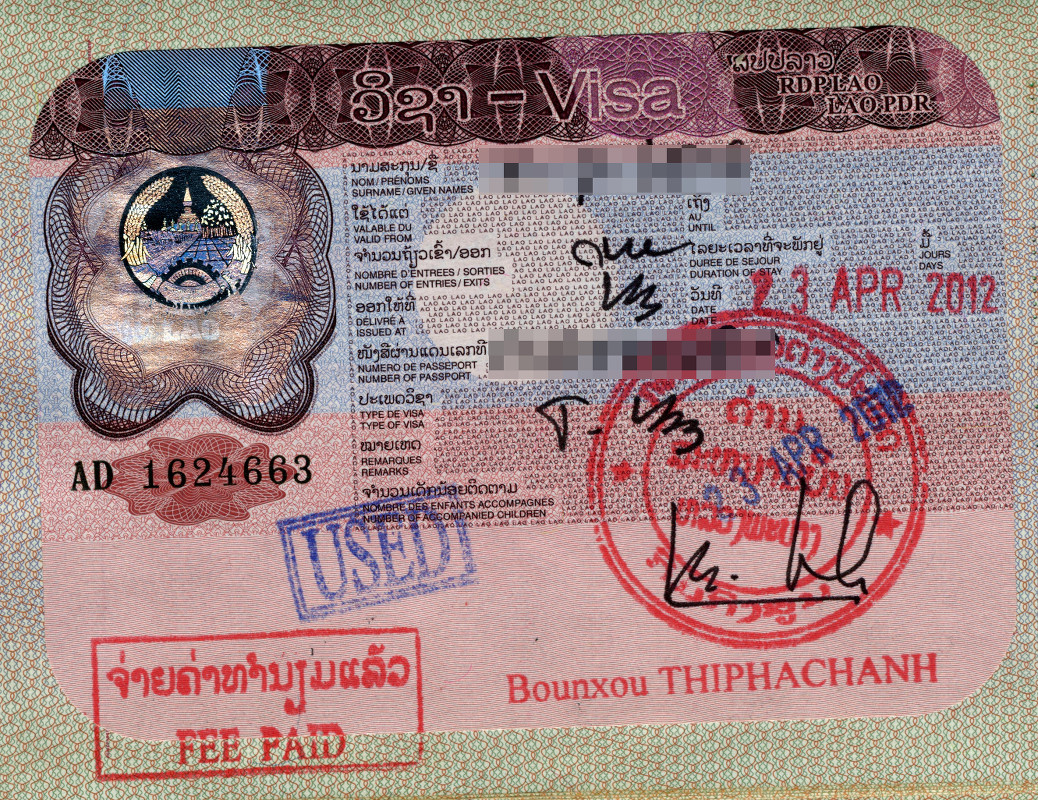
Visa sticker

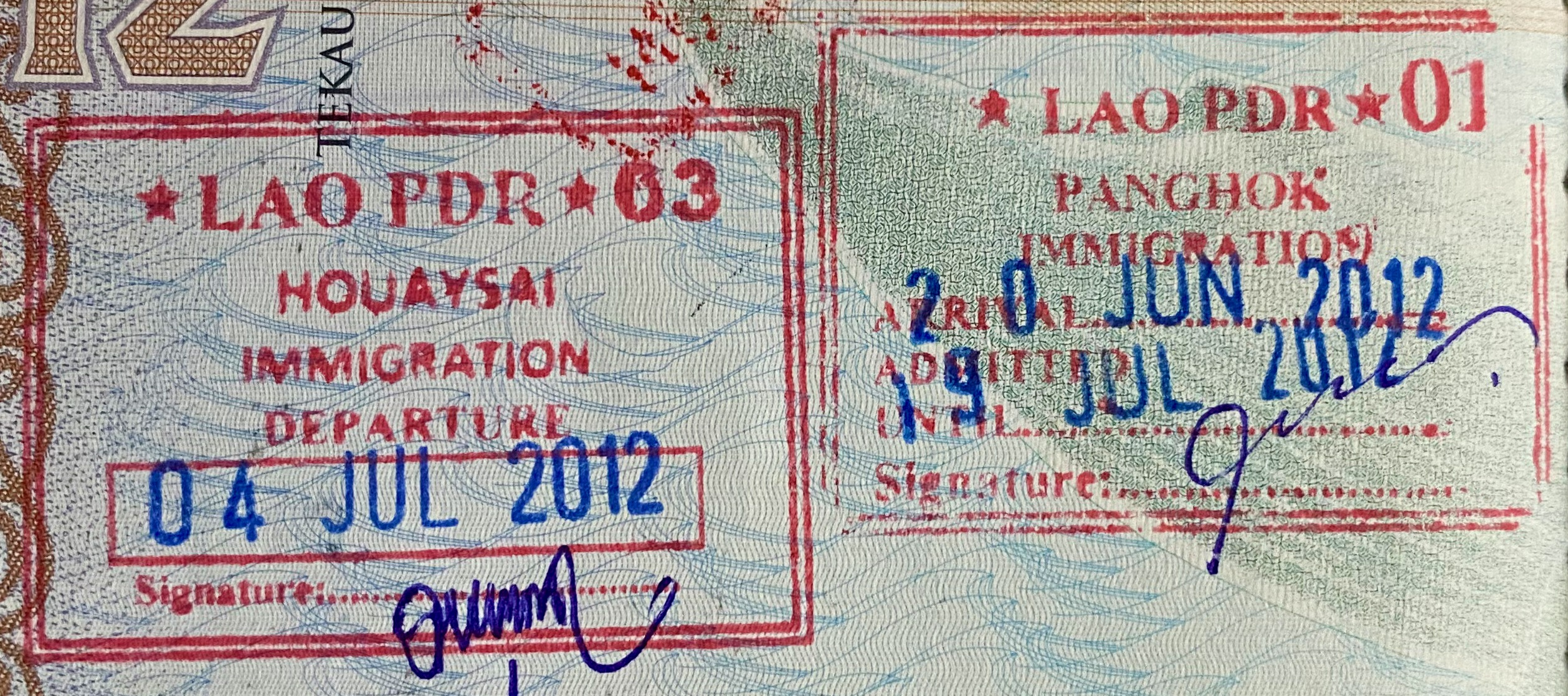
Entry and exit stamps

== Visa policy map ==
Visa policy of Laos Laos Visa not required (30 days) Visa not required (15 days) Visa not required (14 days) Visa on arrival / eVisa (30 days) Visa required

== Visa exemption ==
=== Ordinary passports ===
According to the Ministry of Public Security of Laos, holders of ordinary passports of the following countries (including all ASEAN member states) may enter Laos without a visa for stays up to the duration listed below:

30 days

- All ASEAN member states (except Myanmar)

- Belarus
- Japan
- Mongolia
- Russia
- South Korea

15 days

- Luxembourg
- Switzerland

14 days

- Myanmar

=== Non-ordinary passports ===
Holders of diplomatic, official or service passports issued by following countries may enter Laos without a visa for up to 30 days (unless otherwise noted):

- ASEAN member states (except Indonesia)

- Armenia
- Azerbaijan^{D}
- Bangladesh
- Belarus
- Brazil^{1}
- China
- Hong Kong^{2}
- Cuba^{1}
- Czech Republic^{1}
- Ecuador
- Estonia
- Georgia
- Hungary^{1}
- India
- Indonesia^{2}
- Japan^{1}
- Kazakhstan
- Kuwait
- Kyrgyzstan
- Latvia
- Lithuania
- Mexico^{1}
- Moldova
- Mongolia
- North Korea^{1}
- Norway^{D 1}
- Pakistan^{1}
- Peru^{1}
- Poland^{1}
- Russia
- Serbia
- South Korea^{1}
- Slovakia^{1}
- Switzerland^{1}
- Tajikistan
- Turkey^{D 1}
- Turkmenistan
- Ukraine
- Uzbekistan

_{D - Diplomatic passports only.}
_{1 – 90 days}
_{2 – 14 days}

Date of visa changes
- 17 July 1977: Vietnam (diplomatic and service passports)
- 1 January 1978: Cuba (diplomatic and service passports)
- 18 June 1978: Mongolia (diplomatic and service passports)
- 15 September 1978: Czech Republic, Slovakia (diplomatic and service passports)
- 10 September 1981: Poland (diplomatic and service passports)
- 28 October 1981: Cambodia (diplomatic and service passports)
- 20 December 1984: Armenia, Azerbaijan, (Note: Partially supplanted by a new agreement, covering diplomatic passports only, on 25 December 2017) Belarus, (Note: Supplanted by a new agreement on 20 March 2014) Estonia, Kazakhstan, Kyrgyzstan, Latvia, Lithuania, Moldova, Tajikistan, Turkmenistan, Ukraine, Uzbekistan (diplomatic and service passports)
- 27 March 1989: North Korea (diplomatic and service passports)
- 8 October 1989: China (diplomatic and service passports)
- 1 March 1992: Malaysia (diplomatic and service passports)
- 8 February 1994: Thailand (diplomatic passports)
- 23 May 1996: Philippines (diplomatic and service passports)
- 12 August 1998: Singapore (diplomatic and service passports)
- 23 November 1998: Myanmar (diplomatic and service passports)
- 5 March 1999: Thailand (service passports)
- 16 July 2001: Indonesia (diplomatic and service passports)
- 6 November 2002: India (diplomatic and service passports)
- 22 January 2004: Timor-Leste (diplomatic and service passports)
- 5 March 2004: Vietnam
- 10 May 2004: Cambodia
- 1 July 2004: Malaysia, Singapore
- 28 October 2004: Thailand
- 29 November 2004: Russia (diplomatic and service passports)
- 1 April 2005: Brunei (Note: Supplanted by a new agreement on 30 March 2018)
- 10 April 2005: Philippines
- 1 January 2007: Japan (unilateral, days length extended up to 30 days from Jun 1, 2025)
- 20 August 2007: Japan (diplomatic passports)
- 1 September 2007: Russia (Note: Supplanted by a new agreement on 2 December 2017)
- 14 October 2007: Mongolia (Note: Under the Visa Agreement on 14 September 2007)
- 1 September 2008: South Korea (unilateral)
- 1 June 2009: South Korea (diplomatic and service passports)
- 7 July 2009: Luxembourg and Switzerland (unilateral)
- 20 November 2009: Myanmar
- 23 September 2011: Indonesia
- 5 October 2011: Peru (diplomatic and service passports)
- 23 June 2012: Brazil (diplomatic and service passports)
- 6 January 2013: Bangladesh (diplomatic and service passports)
- 13 July 2014: Serbia (diplomatic and service passports)
- 1 June 2013: Hong Kong (diplomatic and service passports)
- 27 September 2013: Ecuador (diplomatic and service passports)
- 27 January 2014: Mexico (diplomatic and service passports)
- 20 March 2015: Switzerland (diplomatic and service passports)
- 1 April 2015: Japan (service passports)
- 28 October 2015: Kuwait (diplomatic and service passports)
- 25 August 2016: Pakistan (diplomatic and service passports)
- 1 August 2018: Sri Lanka (visa on arrival)
- 1 September 2018: South Korea (unilateral)
- 1 June 2019: Norway (diplomatic passports)
- 9 September 2019: Hungary (diplomatic and service passports)
- 29 January 2020: Turkey (diplomatic passports)
- 1 October 2021: Morocco (diplomatic, official and service passports)
- 1 October 2022: Georgia (diplomatic, official and service passports)
- 5 January 2025: Kazakhstan (diplomatic and service passports)
- 15 August 2025: Timor-Leste
- 15 January 2026: Belarus

Cancelled:

- 1 January 2018 - 31 December 2018: Denmark, Finland, Norway, Sweden
- 1 July 2024 - 31 December 2024: Austria, Belgium, Denmark, Finland, Greece, Norway, Spain and Sweden

According to IATA, the Passport Index, and the Henley Passport Index, citizens of Hong Kong SAR can enter Laos without a visa for 14 days.

== Visa on arrival / Electronic visa (e-Visa) ==
Lao Official Online VIsa
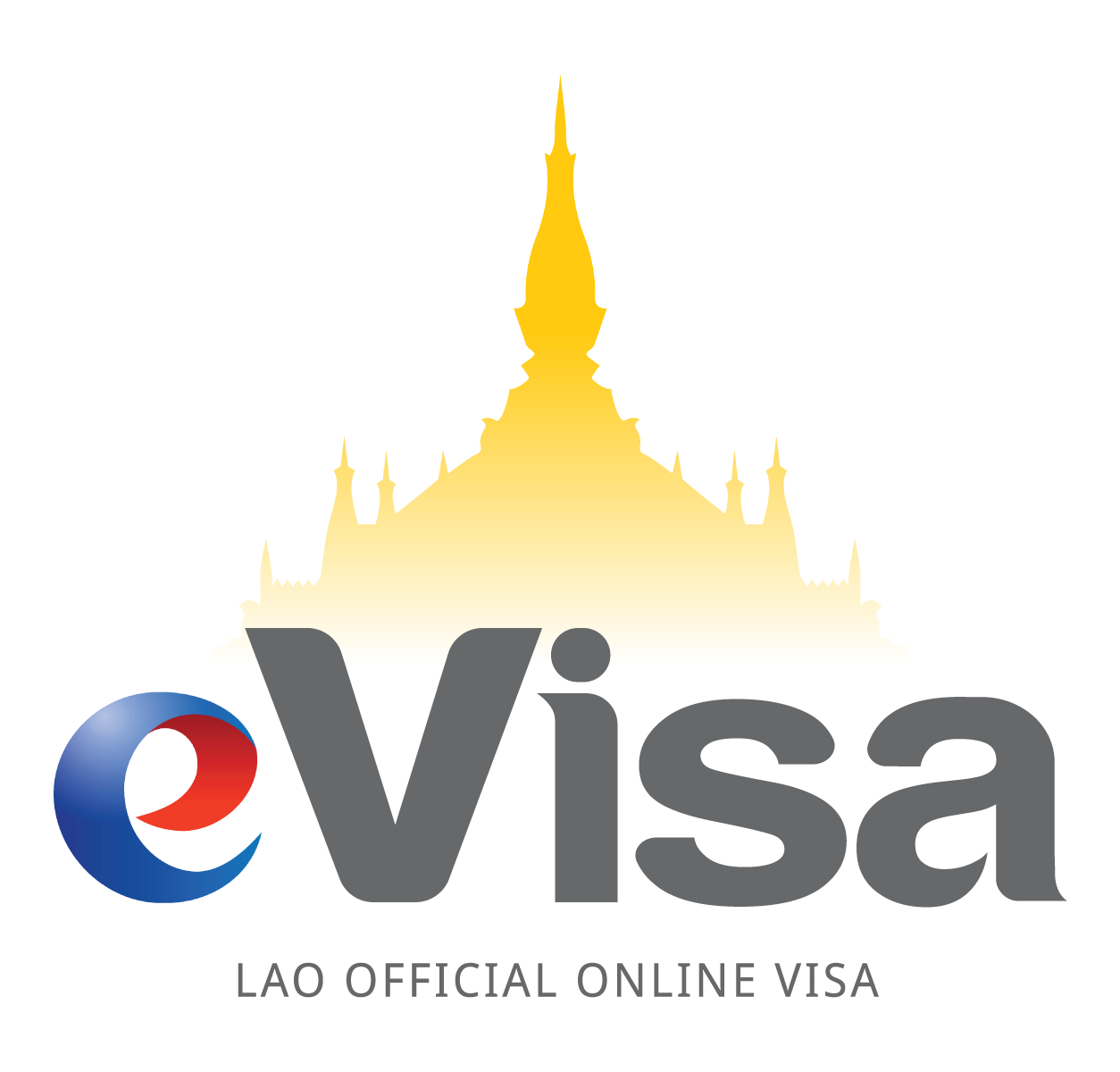

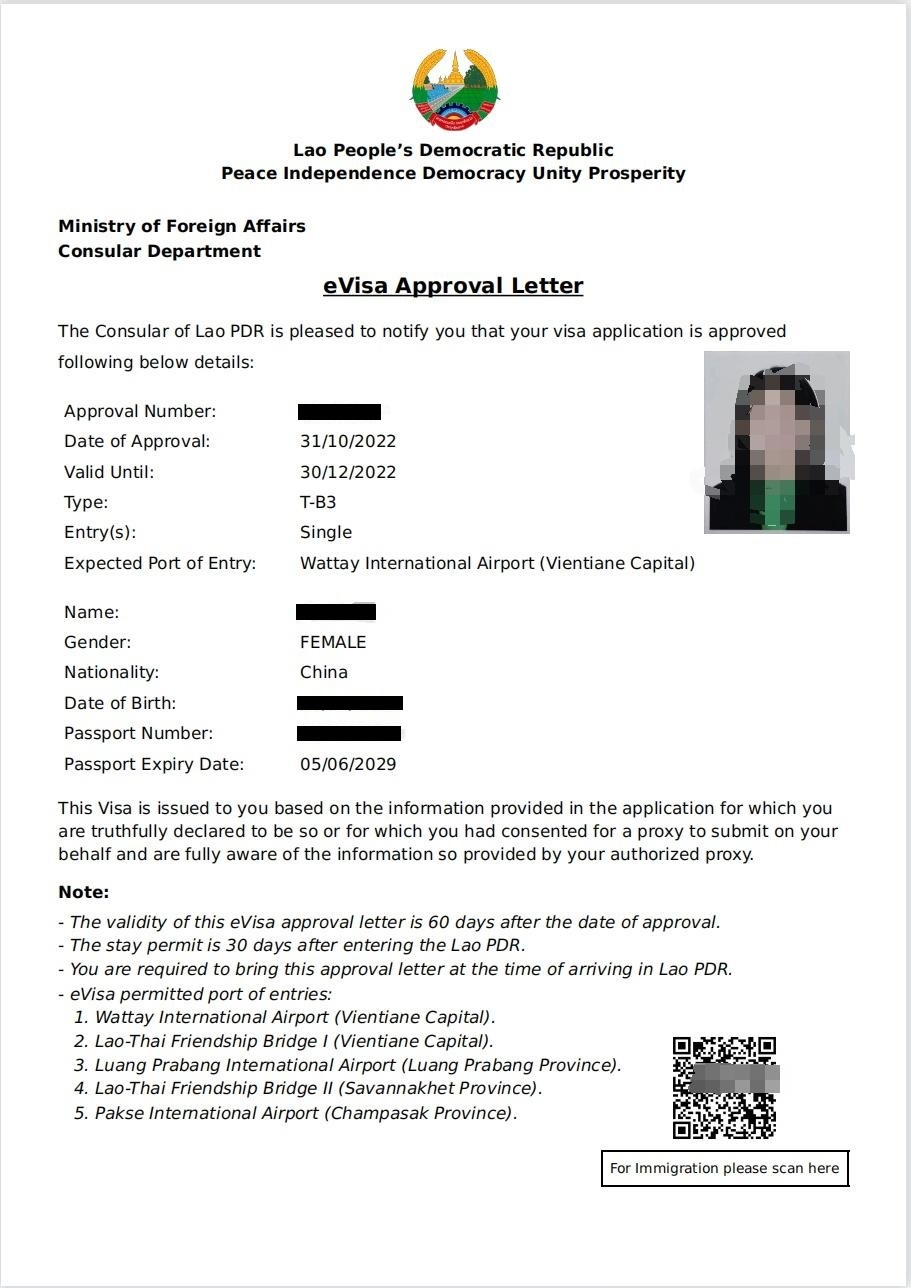
- e-Visa Approval Letter
- Owner: Ministry of Foreign Affairs
- Website: laoevisa.gov.la

External image
- Map of entry points with Visa on Arrival facility

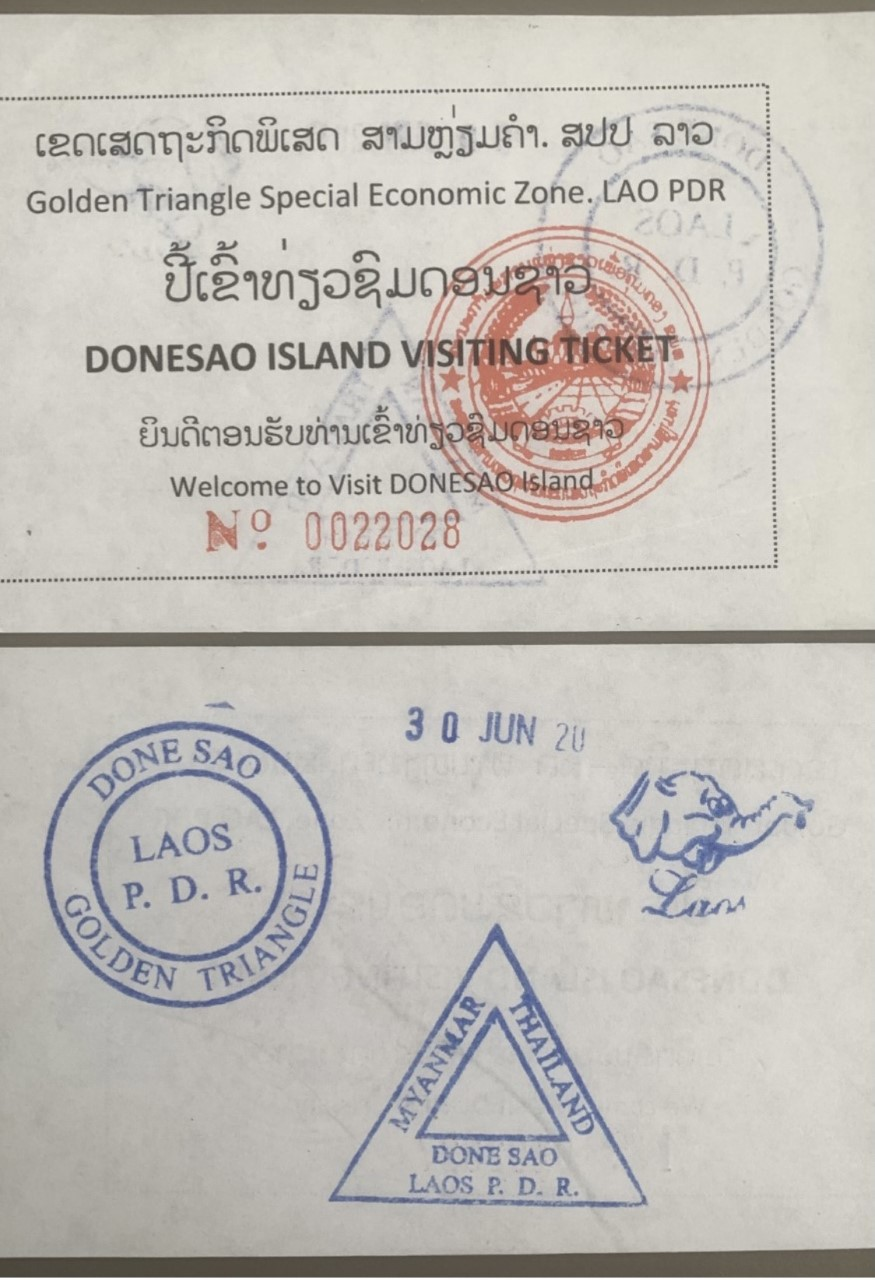
Visa on arrival for Golden Triangle Special Economic Zone

The duration of stay of a visa obtained upon arrival in Laos is 30 days, and can be extended for up to 180 days. Visa extensions are handled by the province immigration office inside Laos for a fee.

The Laos e-Visa service was launched in July 2019. It is valid for 180 days from the date of issuance and its holders may stay for up to 30 days in Laos.

Travellers eligible for a visa on arrival or an e-Visa can enter Laos through one of the following ports of entry: Visa requirements and the availability of visa on arrival or e-Visa may change at individual land border crossings. For recent updates on these requirements, see the Laos visa guide by Laos Bus Tickets.

Port of entry	Opposite side	VoA	eVisa
Luang Prabang International Airport	—N/a	Yes	Yes
Pakse International Airport	—N/a	Yes	Yes
Wattay International Airport (Vientiane)	—N/a	Yes	Yes
Thai-Lao Friendship Bridge I (Vientiane)	Nong Khai, Thailand	Yes	Yes
Thai-Lao Friendship Bridge II (Savannakhet)	Mukdahan, Thailand	Yes	Yes
Thai-Lao Friendship Bridge III (Thakhek)	Nakhon Phanom province, Thailand	Yes	No
Thai-Lao Friendship Bridge IV (Houayxay)	Chiang Khong district, Thailand	Yes	Yes
Samliemkham	Thailand and Myanmar	Yes	No
Khamsavath railway station (Vientiane)	Nong Khai railway station, Thailand	Yes	Yes
Daensavan	Lao Bảo, Vietnam	Yes	No
Veunkham	Nong nok khian, Cambodia	Yes	No
Vang tao	Chong Mek, Thailand	Yes	No
Boten (road checkpoint)	Mohan, China	Yes	Yes
Boten railway station	Mohan railway station, China	No	Yes

== Visa required in advance ==
Citizens of the following countries are ineligible to obtain a visa on arrival or an e-Visa. They must obtain a visa from one of the Laotian diplomatic missions in advance. If they are traveling on an official visit, they may still obtain a visa on arrival, provided they are holding an official letter of guarantee issued by the Ministry of Foreign Affairs of Laos:

- Afghanistan
- Algeria
- Bangladesh
- Burundi
- Cameroon
- Congo
- DR Congo
- Eswatini
- Ghana
- Guinea-Bissau
- Ivory Coast
- Iran
- Iraq
- Jordan
- Lebanon
- Lesotho
- Liberia
- Libya
- Mozambique
- Nauru
- Niger
- Nigeria
- Pakistan
- Senegal
- Sierra Leone
- South Sudan
- Sudan
- Suriname
- Syria
- Tonga
- Zambia
- Zimbabwe

== Visitor statistics ==
Most visitors arriving in Laos were from the following countries of nationality:

Country	2017	2016	2015	2014	2013	2012	2011
Thailand	1,797,803	2,009,605	2,321,352	2,043,761	2,059,434	1,937,612	1,579,941
Vietnam	891,643	998,400	1,187,954	1,108,332	910,164	705,596	561,586
China	639,185	545,493	511,436	422,440	245,033	199,857	150,791
South Korea	170,571	173,260	165,328	96,085	81,799	53,829	34,707
United States	38,765	58,094	63,058	61,460	61,608	53,380	50,092
France	36,760	54,953	55,151	52,146	52,411	46,903	44,399
Japan	32,064	49,191	43,826	44,877	48,644	42,026	37,883
United Kingdom	27,723	39,170	41,508	39,061	41,741	35,964	35,622
Germany	23,776	34,018	31,897	29,800	29,250	23,417	21,280
Australia	20,886	33,077	34,655	44,964	35,441	33,878	31,874
Total	3,868,838	4,239,047	4,684,429	4,158,719	3,779,490	3,330,072	3,330,072

== See also ==
Visa requirements for Laotian citizens
