= Laos–Myanmar relations =

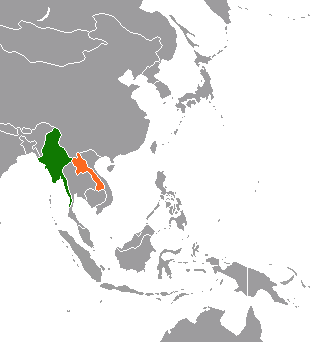
- Myanmar: Laos

Diplomatic mission
- Embassy of Myanmar, Vientiane: Embassy of Laos, Yangon

Envoy
- Ambassador Aung Ko: Ambassador Bounphieng Chanthavong

Laos–Myanmar relations is one that of a long, close relationship between the two neighbors, Laos and Myanmar. Myanmar has an embassy in Vientiane and Laos has an embassy in Yangon.

== History and modern relations ==
While the two countries share common Theravada Buddhism, both often engaged in war from 16th century onward. The Taungoo dynasty had conquered Laos during the reign of Bayinnaung. Setthathirath led the Lan Xang Kingdom into a resistance war against the Burmese but failed. With the collapse of Taungoo Empire, the Laotians soon restored their nation from the Burmese.

The Burmese would go on to conquer Laos for the second time as Konbaung dynasty, and Lan Xang this time was unable to fend off again. Similar to the first invasion, Burma would go on crippled due to war with the Chinese that saw Lan Xang regain independence for the second time.

In the 19th century, both would go on to become British and French colony separately. Since then, there had been no relationship between two and the Vietnam War that occurred near the Laotian border also prevented Laos and Burma from establishing official relations. Laos and Myanmar only established official ties starting in the 1990s.

== Cooperation ==
Since the 1990s, increasing cooperation started as both countries joined the ASEAN.

In 2015, the first official friendship bridge between the two neighbors was opened. Both countries have attempted to expand bilateral trade and cooperation.

== See also ==
- Laos–Myanmar border
