= Visa requirements for Laotian citizens =

Administrative entry restrictions

Cover of a Laotian passport

Visa requirements for Laotian citizens are administrative entry restrictions by the authorities of other states placed on citizens of the Laos.

As of 2026, Laotian citizens had visa-free or visa on arrival access to 45 countries and territories, ranking the Laotian passport 87th in the world according to the Henley Passport Index.

== Visa requirements map ==
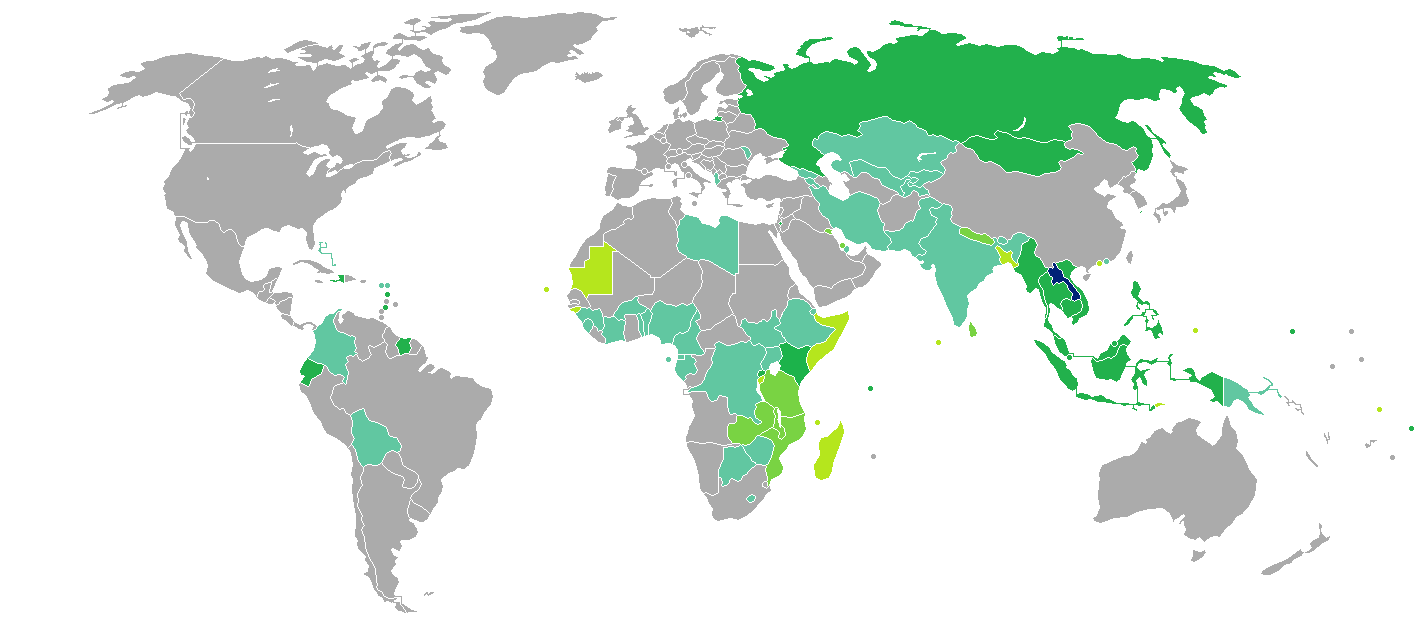
Visa requirements for Laotian citizens holding ordinary passports Laos Visa not required Visa on arrival eVisa Visa available both on arrival or online Visa required

== Visa requirements ==
Country	Visa requirement	Allowed stay	Notes (excluding departure fees)
Afghanistan	eVisa	30 days	Visa is not required in case born in Afghanistan or can proof that one of their parents is a national of Afghanistan or born in Afghanistan.; e-Visa : Visitors must arrive at Kabul International (KBL).
Albania	eVisa	90 days	Visa is not required for Holders of a valid multiple-entry Schengen, UK or US visa has been previously used once or residence permit of Ireland, Schengen, UK, US or UAE 10 years.
Algeria	Visa required	30 days	Visa Issuance for passengers with a boarding authorization traveling as tourists to cities in the south of Algeria (Timimoun, Ghardaia, Ilizi, Djanet or Tamanraset) can obtain a visa on arrival for a maximum of 30 days. They must have: a return/onward ticket, a hotel reservation confirmation.
Andorra	Visa required		There are no visa requirements for entry into Andorra, but it can only be accessed by passing through France or Spain. A multiple entry visa is required to re-enter either France or Spain when leaving Andorra.; All visitors can stay for 3 months.
Angola	eVisa		
Antigua and Barbuda	eVisa		Holders of a visa or residency issued by Canada, USA, United Kingdom or a Schengen Member State can obtain a visa upon arrival that costs USD100 for a maximum of 30 days.
Argentina	Visa required		The AVE (High Speed Travel) is open to Laotian citizens holding valid, current ordinary passports traveling to Argentina for tourism. To do so, they must hold a valid category B2/J/B1/O/P (P1-P2-P3)/E/H-1B visa issued by the United States of America.
Armenia	eVisa	120 days	
Australia	Visa required		May apply online (Online Visitor e600 visa).
Austria	Visa required		
Azerbaijan	Visa required		
Bahamas	eVisa		
Bahrain	eVisa / Visa on arrival	14 days	
Bangladesh	Visa on arrival	30 days	
Barbados	Visa required		
Belarus	Visa not required	30 days	For a maximum total stay of 90 days within any 180 day period.
Belgium	Visa required		
Belize	Visa required		Visa is not required for holders of a valid multiple-entry visa or permanent residence of Canada, Schengen or US.
Benin	eVisa	30 days	Must have an international vaccination certificate.
Bhutan	eVisa		
Bolivia	Online Visa	30 days	
Bosnia and Herzegovina	Visa required		
Botswana	eVisa	3 months	
Brazil	Visa required		
Brunei	Visa not required	30 days	
Bulgaria	Visa required		
Burkina Faso	eVisa		
Burundi	Visa on arrival	1 month	
Cambodia	Visa not required	30 days	
Cameroon	eVisa		
Canada	Visa required		
Cape Verde	Visa on arrival		
Central African Republic	Visa required		
Chad	Visa required		
Chile	Visa required		
China	Visa required		
Colombia	Online Visa		
Comoros	Visa on arrival	45 days	
Republic of the Congo	Visa required		
Democratic Republic of the Congo	eVisa	7 days	
Costa Rica	Visa required		
Côte d'Ivoire	eVisa	3 months	e-Visa holders must arrive via Port Bouet Airport.
Croatia	Visa required		
Cuba	eVisa	90 days	Can be extended up to 90 days with a fee.; Tourist card must be obtained in advance via travel agency, airline or at the embassy.
Cyprus	Visa required		
Czech Republic	Visa required		
Denmark	Visa required		
Djibouti	eVisa	90 days	
Dominica	Visa not required	21 days	
Dominican Republic	Visa required		
Ecuador	Visa not required	90 days	
Egypt	Visa required		
El Salvador	Visa required		
Equatorial Guinea	eVisa		
Eritrea	Visa required		
Estonia	Visa required		
Eswatini	Visa required		
Ethiopia	eVisa	up to 90 days	e-Visa holders must arrive via Addis Ababa Bole International Airport.
Fiji	Visa required		
Finland	Visa required		
France	Visa required		
Gabon	eVisa	90 days	e-Visa holders must arrive via Libreville International Airport.
Gambia	Visa required		
Georgia	eVisa	30 days	
Germany	Visa required		
Ghana	Visa required		
Greece	Visa required		
Grenada	Visa required		
Guatemala	Visa required		
Guinea	eVisa	90 days	
Guinea-Bissau	Visa on arrival	90 days	
Guyana	Visa required		
Haiti	Visa not required	3 months	
Honduras	Visa required		
Hungary	Visa required		
Iceland	Visa required		
India	eVisa	30 days	e-Visa holders must arrive via 32 designated airports (Note: Ahmedabad; Amritsar; Bagdogra; Bengaluru; Bhubaneswar; Chandigarh; Chennai; Coimbatore; Delhi; Gaya; Goa-Dabolim; Goa-Manohar; Guwahati; Hyderabad; Indore; Jaipur; Kannur; Kochi; Kolkata; Kozhikode; Lucknow; Madurai; Mangaluru; Mumbai; Nagpur; Port Blair; Pune; Surat; Thiruvananthapuram; Tiruchirappalli; Varanasi; Visakhapatnam) or 5 designated seaports. (Note: Chennai; Cochin; Mormugao (Goa); Mumbai; Mangalore); An Indian e-Tourist Visa may only be obtained twice within 1 calendar year.; Foreigners of Pakistani origin or who hold a Pakistani Passport are not eligible for an e-Visa. Foreigners who are not Pakistani nationals, but whose parents or grandparents (either paternal or maternal) were born in, or were permanent residents in Pakistan, are also not eligible for an e-Visa.
Indonesia	Visa not required	30 days	
Iran	eVisa	30 days	
Iraq	eVisa		
Ireland	Visa required		
Israel	Visa required		
Italy	Visa required		
Jamaica	Visa required		
Japan	Visa required		
Jordan	Visa required		
Kazakhstan	eVisa		
Kenya	Electronic Travel Authorisation	90 days	Applications can be submitted up to 90 days prior to travel and must be submitted at least 3 days in advance.; eTA fee is 32.50 USD.; Proof of reservation at the hotel where visitors plan to stay is required (if staying with friends, an invitation letter is also acceptable).; Yellow fever vaccination certificate is required if coming from endemic countries.
Kiribati	Visa required		
North Korea	Visa required		
South Korea	Visa required		Laotian citizens may visit Jeju Island for stays up to 30 days without obtaining a visa.
Kuwait	eVisa / Visa on arrival	3 months	
Kyrgyzstan	eVisa		
Latvia	Visa required		
Lebanon	Visa required		
Lesotho	eVisa		
Liberia	Visa required		
Libya	eVisa		
Liechtenstein	Visa required		
Lithuania	Visa required		
Luxembourg	Visa required		
Madagascar	Visa on arrival	60 days	
Malawi	eVisa / Visa on arrival	90 days	
Malaysia	Visa not required	30 days	
Maldives	Free visa on arrival	30 days	
Mali	Visa required		
Malta	Visa required		
Marshall Islands	Visa required		
Mauritania	eVisa		
Mauritius	Visa required		
Mexico	Visa required		
Micronesia	Visa not required	30 days	
Moldova	Visa required		
Monaco	Visa required		
Mongolia	Visa not required	30 days	
Montenegro	Visa required		
Morocco	Visa required		
Mozambique	eVisa / Visa on arrival	30 days	
Myanmar	Visa not required	14 days	
Namibia	Visa required		
Nauru	Visa required		
Nepal	Online Visa / Visa on arrival	90 days	
Netherlands	Visa required		
New Zealand	Visa required		Holders of an Australian Permanent Resident Visa or Resident Return Visa may be granted a New Zealand Resident Visa on arrival permitting indefinite stay (pursuant to the Trans-Tasman Travel Arrangement), subject to meeting character requirements and obtaining an Electronic Travel Authority prior to departure.
Nicaragua	Visa required		
Niger	Visa required		
Nigeria	eVisa	90 days	
North Macedonia	Visa required		
Norway	Visa required		
Oman	Visa required		
Pakistan	Online Visa	3 months	Online Visa eligible.
Palau	Free visa on arrival	30 days	
Panama	Visa required		
Papua New Guinea	eVisa	60 days	Visitors may apply for a visa online under the "Tourist - Own Itinerary" category.
Paraguay	Visa required		
Peru	Visa required		
Philippines	Visa not required	30 days	
Poland	Visa required		
Portugal	Visa required		
Qatar	eVisa		Travelers can apply for a visa on the Hayya website.
Romania	Visa required		
Russia	Visa not required	30 days	For a maximum total stay of 90 days within any 180 day period.
Rwanda	Visa not required	30 days	
Saint Kitts and Nevis	eVisa		
Saint Lucia	Visa required		
Saint Vincent and the Grenadines	Visa not required	3 months	
Samoa	Visa not required	60 days	
San Marino	Visa required		
São Tomé and Príncipe	eVisa		
Saudi Arabia	Visa required		
Senegal	Visa required		
Serbia	Visa required		
Seychelles	Electronic Border System	3 months	Application can be submitted up to 30 days before travel.; Visitors must upload a reservation confirmation(s) for each visitor's location of stay in Seychelles.; Yellow fever vaccination certificate is required if coming from endemic countries.; Payment of the fee (EUR 10) by credit or debit card.; Valid for one journey only and it expires once exit the country.
Sierra Leone	eVisa	3 months	
Singapore	Visa not required	30 days	
Slovakia	Visa required		
Slovenia	Visa required		
Solomon Islands	Visa required		
Somalia	eVisa	30 days	
South Africa	Visa required		
South Sudan	eVisa		Obtainable online.; Printed visa authorization must be presented at the time of travel.
Spain	Visa required		
Sri Lanka	eVisa / Visa on arrival	60 days / 30 days	Sri Lanka introduced an ETA valid for 30 days.
Sudan	Visa required		
Suriname	Visa not required	90 days	An entrance fee of USD 50 or EUR 50 must be paid online prior to arrival.; Multiple entry e-Visa is also available.
Sweden	Visa required		Visa for Laotian citizens visiting Sweden within the Schengen Area is applicable for a processing time of 15 days.
Switzerland	Visa required		
Syria	eVisa		
Tajikistan	eVisa	60 days	
Tanzania	eVisa / Visa on arrival	90 days	
Thailand	Visa not required	30 days	
Timor-Leste	Visa not required	30 days	
Togo	eVisa	15 days	
Tonga	Visa required		
Trinidad and Tobago	Visa required		
Tunisia	Visa required		
Turkey	Visa required		
Turkmenistan	Visa required		
Tuvalu	Visa on arrival	1 month	
Uganda	eVisa	3 months	Up to 24-month multiple entry is available for applicants who are able to provide the right documentation.
Ukraine	Visa required		e-Visa (30 days) is currently suspended.
United Arab Emirates	Visa required		May apply using 'Smart service'.
United Kingdom	Visa required		
United States	Partial visa restrictions		Effective June 9, 2025, no new immigrant visas will be issued to nationals of the seven countries, and no B-1, B-2, B-1/B-2, F, M, or J nonimmigrant visas will be issued, with certain exemptions.
Uruguay	Visa required		
Uzbekistan	eVisa	30 days	
Vanuatu	Visa required		
Vatican City	Visa required		
Venezuela	eVisa		Introduction of Electronic Visa System for Tourist and Business Travelers.
Vietnam	Visa not required	30 days	
Yemen	Visa required		
Zambia	eVisa / Visa on arrival	90 days	
Zimbabwe	eVisa	3 months	

== See also ==
- Visa policy of Laos
- Laotian passport
