= Japan–Laos relations =

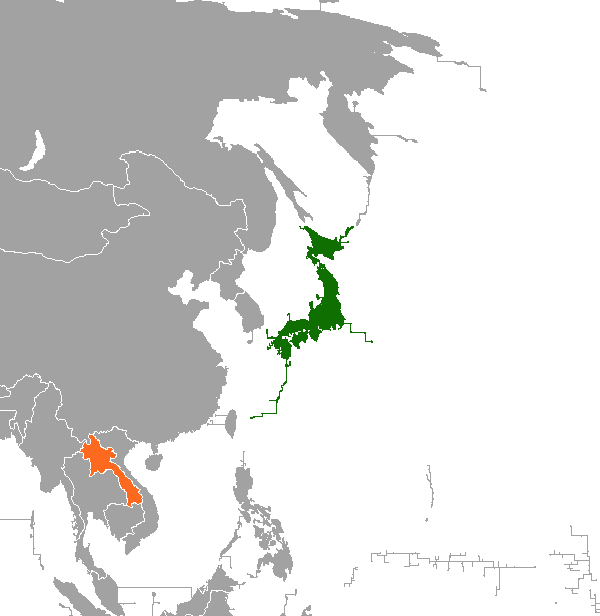
- Japan: Laos

Diplomatic relations between Japan and Laos (Japanese: 日本とラオスの関係, Lao: ສາຍພົວພັນ ລາວ-ຍີ່ປຸ່ນ) were established in 1955. Laos has an embassy in Tokyo, and Japan has an embassy in Vientiane.

== State visits ==
In March 2012, Prime Minister of Laos Thongsing Thammavong visited Prime Minister of Japan Yoshihiko Noda in Tokyo. In November 2025, to commemorate 70 years of diplomatic relations between the two countries, Princess Aiko visited Laos, the first leg of her first official overseas visit.
