= Laos–Russia relations =

- Laos: Russia

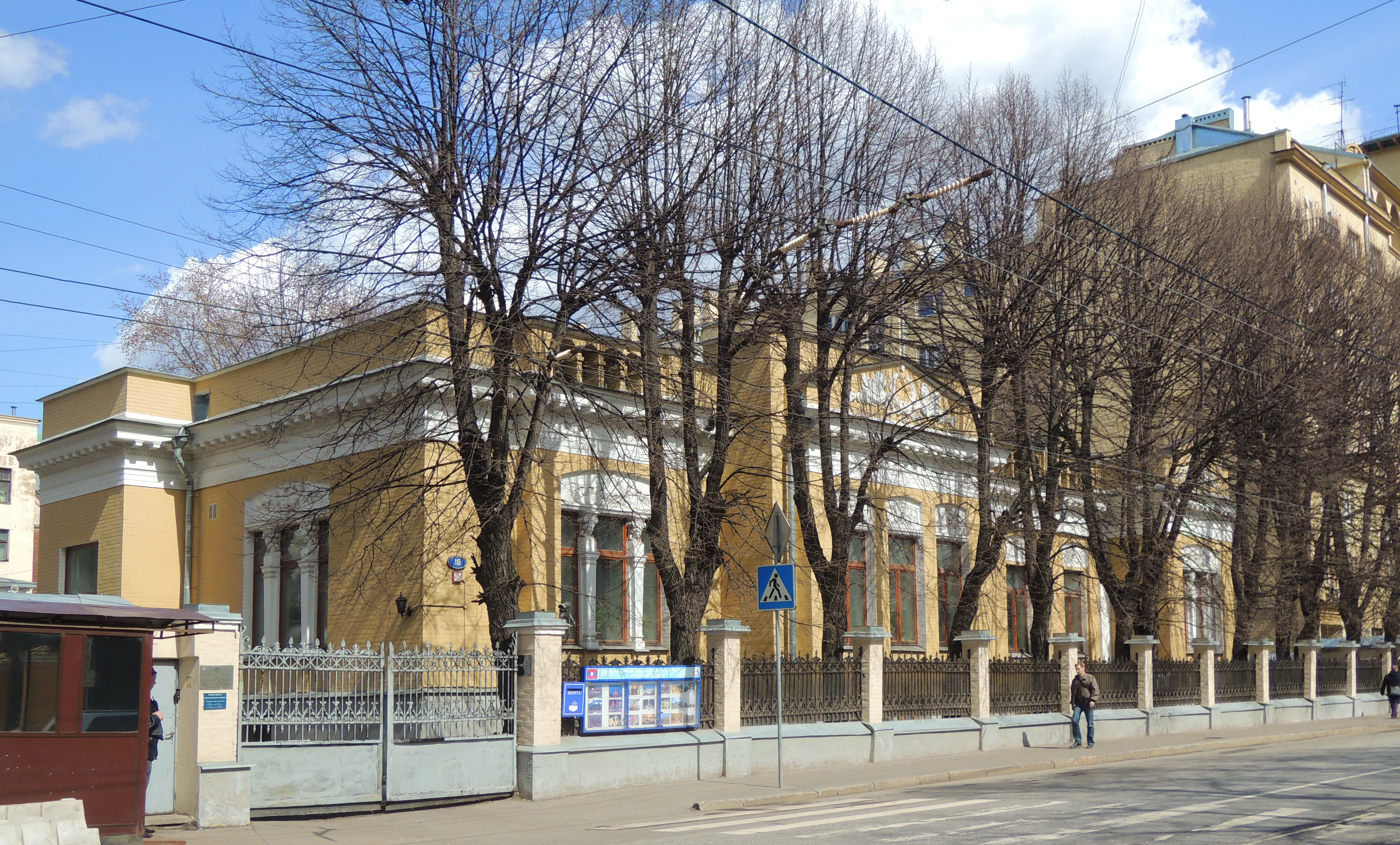
Laos embassy in Moscow, Russia.

Laos–Russia relations are the current and historical relations between Laos and the Russian Federation. On 31 December 1991, Laos recognised the Russian Federation as the successor state to the Soviet Union, after the latter's dissolution. Laos has an embassy in Moscow, while Russia has an embassy in Vientiane.

== Soviet Union—Laos relations ==
The Soviet Union established diplomatic relations with Laos on October 7, 1960. The Lao representative in France was accredited to the Soviet Union, and the ambassador of the Soviet Union to Cambodia was accredited to Laos. On December 1, 1962, the USSR and Laos signed several agreements, including the ones on trade and payments, on economic and technical assistance in the construction of a hydroelectric power station on the Nam Niep River, and on the construction of a hospital and a radio station in Vientiane on pro donate basis.

== Russian Federation—Laos relations ==
Since 2014, Russia and Laos have been working on increasing cooperation. Russian politician Valentina Matviyenko met with Lao politician Pany Yathotou, discussing improving and strengthening relations between the two countries. Tourism from Russia to Laos has gone up over the last several years, with Russian citizens not needing a visa to enter Laos. Around 200 Laotian students attended school in Russia. Plans were also made to create a Russian language school in Vientiane.

== Education ==
The Russian Embassy School in Vientiane serves Russian families in Laos.

== See also ==
- Foreign relations of Laos
- Foreign relations of Russia
- List of ambassadors of Russia to Laos
