= Kunming-Singapore Railway =

Proposed train service in Southeast Asia

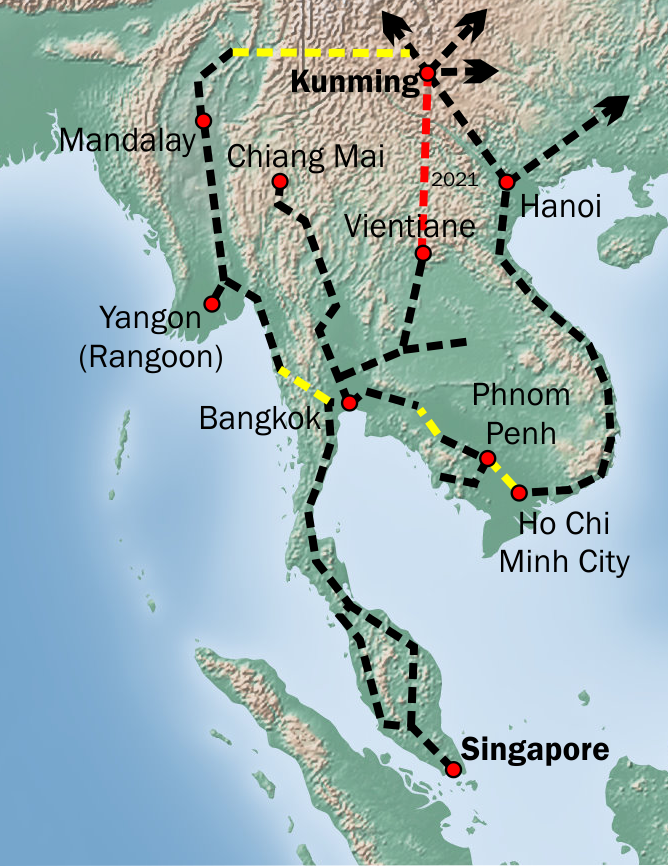
- Overview of the projected links (in yellow) and already opened (in red and black). Kunming–Singapore railway.

Overview
- Status: Operational: Kunming–Vientiane; Under Construction: Dali–Ruili Nakhon Ratchasima–Bangkok (high-speed); Planned: Nakhon Ratchasima–Nong Khai (high-speed)
- Locale: Yunnan Province; Mainland Southeast Asia

History
- Opened: 1 July 1918 (Bangkok–Padang Besar section); 31 July 1958 (Bangkok–Nong Khai section); 3 May 1932 (Padang Besar–Singapore section); 5 March 2009 (Nong Khai–Thanaleng section); 3 December 2021 (Kunming–Vientiane section)
- Closed: 30 June 2011 (Woodlands – Tanjong Pagar section)

Technical
- Line length: 3,900 km (2,400 mi)
- Track gauge: 1,435 mm (4 ft 8 1/2 in) standard gauge (Kunming–Vientiane); 1,000 mm (3 ft 3 3/8 in) metre gauge (Indochina)
- Electrification: 25 kV 50/60 Hz AC (Kunming–Vientiane section and KTM ETS)

How the central route will look when completed

The Kunming–Singapore railway, also referred to as the Pan-Asian Railway, is a network of railways that connects China, Singapore, and all the countries of mainland Southeast Asia. The concept originated with the British and French colonial empires, which sought to link the railways they had built in southwest China, Indochina, and Malaya, but international conflicts in the 20th century kept regional railways fragmented. The idea was formally revived in October 2006, when 18 Asian and Eurasian countries signed the Trans-Asian Railway Network Agreement, which incorporated the Kunming–Singapore railway into the Trans-Asian Railway network.

The network consists of three main routes, from Kunming, China, to Bangkok, Thailand: the Eastern route via Vietnam and Cambodia; the Central route via Laos, and the Western route via Myanmar. The southern half of the network, from Bangkok to Singapore, has been operational since 1918. The Central route was inaugurated on 3 December 2021, with the opening of the Yuxi–Mohan railway and the Boten–Vientiane railway linking with the other operational segments of the route, which formally connected Kunming and Singapore directly by rail. There have been plans for high-speed railway constructions, though only one line (between Bangkok and Nakhon Ratchasima) has since entered the construction phase.

The railway network is expected to increase regional economic integration and increase China's economic ties with Southeast Asia.

== History ==
=== Colonial railways ===
The British and French Empires first proposed building a railway from Kunming to Singapore in 1900 as Russia was completing the Trans-Siberian Railway. From 1904 to 1910, the French built the Yunnan–Vietnam railway, to connect Kunming with Hanoi and Haiphong in French Tonkin, now northern Vietnam.

In 1918, the southern line of the Thailand railway system was connected with British Malaya's west coast line, completing a metre gauge rail link from Bangkok to Singapore. In the late-1930s, the British began to build the Yunnan–Burma railway but abandoned the effort in 1941 with the outbreak of World War II.

In 1936, Vietnam's main railway, from Hanoi to Saigon was completed. This French-built system was (and still is) metre-gauge.

In 1942, the railways of Thailand and Cambodia were connected linking Bangkok and Phnom Penh, but this trans-border connection has long since fallen into disuse. The Japanese Empire built the infamous Thailand–Burma railway using prisoners of war to connect Bangkok and Yangon, but the entire line never entered commercial operation and is now partially submerged by the reservoir behind the Vajiralongkorn Dam.

A continuous metre-gauge rail line from Kunming to Singapore via Hanoi, Saigon, Phnom Penh, Bangkok, and Kuala Lumpur was not realized as the French never built the "missing link" between Phnom Penh and Saigon, choosing to build a highway instead.

=== 21st-century revival ===
In 2000, ASEAN proposed completing the Kunming to Singapore railway, via Hanoi, Ho Chi Minh City (formerly Saigon), Phnom Penh, and Bangkok. This 5,500 km (3,400 mi) route is now known as the eastern route. In 2004, ASEAN and China proposed the shorter western route, which instead of running east through Vietnam and Cambodia, would go west from Kunming to Myanmar and then to Bangkok. In 2007 ASEAN and China proposed building three routes, the Eastern, Western and a central route via Laos.

As of 2024, there has been solid progress in building the railway.

== Overview ==
Note that a grouped column before multiple lines denote lines that span the same origin and destination, but run along different speed or gauge.

Eastern route - 60 km/h - 3,300 km
Country	Corridor / Line		Description	Designed Speed (km/h)	Length (km)	Gauge	Open Date
China	Kunming–Hanoi	Kunming–Yuxi–Hekou Railway	Kunming to Yuxi upgraded in 2016. Connects the border town of Hekou with its Vietnamese counterpart at Lào Cai.	200 (Kunming to Yuxi) 140 (Yuxi to Hekou)	388	Standard	2014
China	Kunming–Hanoi	Kunming–Hekou Railway	Chinese section of the Kunming–Haiphong railway	60	466	Metre	1902
Vietnam	Kunming–Hanoi	High Speed Railway	A proposed Vietnamese high-speed line to connect Hanoi to Kunming via the Kunming–Yuxi–Hekou Railway	Unknown	Unknown	Standard	Unknown
Vietnam	Kunming–Hanoi	Lào Cai–Hanoi Railway	Colonial-era metre-gauge railway running between Hanoi and the China-Vietnam border at Lào Cai; part of the Kunming–Haiphong railway	~60	296	Metre	1902
Vietnam	Hanoi–Ho Chi Minh City	North–South Railway	Vietnam's north–south railway and main railway backbone	~60	1726	Metre	1936
Vietnam	Hanoi–Ho Chi Minh City	North-South Express Railway	A proposed high-speed line for the north–south railway	350	1570	Standard	2035
Cambodia	Ho Chi Minh City–Phnom Penh	Ho Chi Minh City–Phnom Penh Railway	Proposed railway section connecting Ho Chi Minh City and Phnom Penh	Unknown	~250	Unknown	Unknown
Cambodia	Phnom Penh–Poipet	Phnom Penh–Poipet Railway	Rebuilt railway connecting Phnom Penh with the Cambodia-Thailand border town of Poipet	~90	~386	Metre	2018
Thailand	Ban Klong Luk–Bangkok	Eastern Line	Thailand's Eastern railway line	~100	261	Metre	1907

Central route - 100 km/h - 1,660 km
Country	Corridor / Line		Description	Designed Speed (km/h)	Length (km)	Gauge	Open Date
China	Kunming–Yuxi		Part of the Kunming–Yuxi–Hekou main railway upgraded in 2016	200	106	Standard	1993
China	Yuxi–Mohan		Line connecting Yuxi with the China-Laos border at Mohan	160	507	Standard	2021
Laos	Boten–Vientiane		First railway line in Laos spanning the country, between the Chinese border at Boten to the capital Vientiane near the Thai border	160	422	Standard	2021
Laos	Vientiane–Nong Khai	Vientiane–Nong Khai	First international railway line to Laos, across First Thai–Lao Friendship Bridge to Thanaleng, Vientiane Prefecture. The 9-km extension to Khamsavath station opened in 2023.	~100	14	Metre	2009
Laos	Vientiane–Nong Khai	Northeastern high-speed rail line	A new high-speed standard-gauge line (Phase 3) (including a new Mekong bridge which is 50 meters from the current one)	250	16	Standard	Unknown
Thailand	Nong Khai–Bangkok	Northeastern Line	Thailand's Northeastern railway line to Nong Khai and further to the Lao border (Mekong River)	~100	627	Metre	1958
Thailand	Nong Khai–Bangkok	Northeastern high-speed rail line	A new high-speed standard-gauge line (Phase 2)	250	356	Standard	Unknown
Thailand	Nong Khai–Bangkok	Northeastern high-speed rail line	A new high-speed standard-gauge line under construction, connecting Nakhon Ratchasima to Bang Sue Grand Station (Phase 1)	250	253	Standard	2027

Western route - 24 km/h - 2,670 km
Country	Corridor / Line	Description	Designed Speed (km/h)	Length (km)	Gauge	Open Date
China	Guangtong–Kunming	Final section to Kunming via the Chengdu–Kunming Railway (reconstructed 2010–22)	200	106	Standard	2013
China	Guangtong–Dali	New double-tracked line from Guangtong to Dali	200	213	Standard	2018
China	Dali–Ruili	Completed section.	140	134	Standard	2022
China	Dali–Ruili	Under construction to Muse at the China-Myanmar border.	140	196	Standard	c.2026
Myanmar	Muse–Lashio	Proposed line extending Myanmar's existing railway to the Chinese border at Muse	Unknown	~120	Unknown	Not built
Myanmar	Lashio–Mandalay	Part of Myanmar's national railway system	~24	441	Metre	1905
Myanmar	Mandalay–Yangon	Part of Myanmar's national railway system	~24	620	Metre	1889
Myanmar	Yangon–Mawlamyine	Part of Myanmar's national railway system	~24	286	Metre	1907
Myanmar	Mawlamyine–Thanbyuzayat	Part of Myanmar's national railway system	~24	64	Metre	1924
Thailand	Thanbyuzayat–Nam Tok	Part of the old Burma Railway, now disused.	Unknown	~285	Metre	Abandoned
Thailand	Nam Tok–Bangkok	Part of the old Burma Railway, rehabilitated by 1957.	~100	194	Metre	1957

Shared Bangkok–Singapore section - 100 km/h - 1,940 km
Country	Corridor / Line		Description	Designed Speed (km/h)	Length (km)	Gauge	Open Date
Thailand	Bangkok–Hat Yai–Padang Besar	Southern Line	Thailand's Southern railway line and branch line to the Malaysian border at Padang Besar	~100	974	Metre	1918
Malaysia	Padang Besar–Kuala Lumpur	West Coast Railway Line	Electrified and operated by KTM ETS since December 2025.	160	533	Metre	c.1896
Malaysia	Kuala Lumpur–Johor Bahru	West Coast Railway Line	Electrified and operated by KTM ETS since December 2025.	160	369	Metre	c.1896
Malaysia	Kuala Lumpur–Johor Bahru	Kuala Lumpur–Singapore HSR	Proposed High Speed Railway	320	335	Standard	Unknown
Singapore	Johor Bahru–Singapore	West Coast Railway Line	Shuttle Tebrau service running between Johor Bahru and Singapore	110	2	Metre	1903
Singapore	Johor Bahru–Singapore	Kuala Lumpur–Singapore HSR	Proposed High Speed Railway	320	15	Standard	Unknown
Singapore	Johor Bahru–Singapore	RTS Link	RTS Link service between Johor Bahru and Singapore, projected to open in 2027.	110	4	Standard	2027

== Sections ==
=== Eastern route ===
==== In China ====
- Kunming–Yuxi–Hekou railway, 388 km (241 mi) standard gauge railway from Kunming to Hekou (via Yuxi and Mengzi, completed in 2014).
  - Kunming–Hai Phong railway (Kunming-Hekou section), 465 km old metre gauge railway parallel to the newer railway, from Kunming to the Hekou Yao Autonomous County on the border with Vietnam (completed in 1910).

==== In Vietnam ====
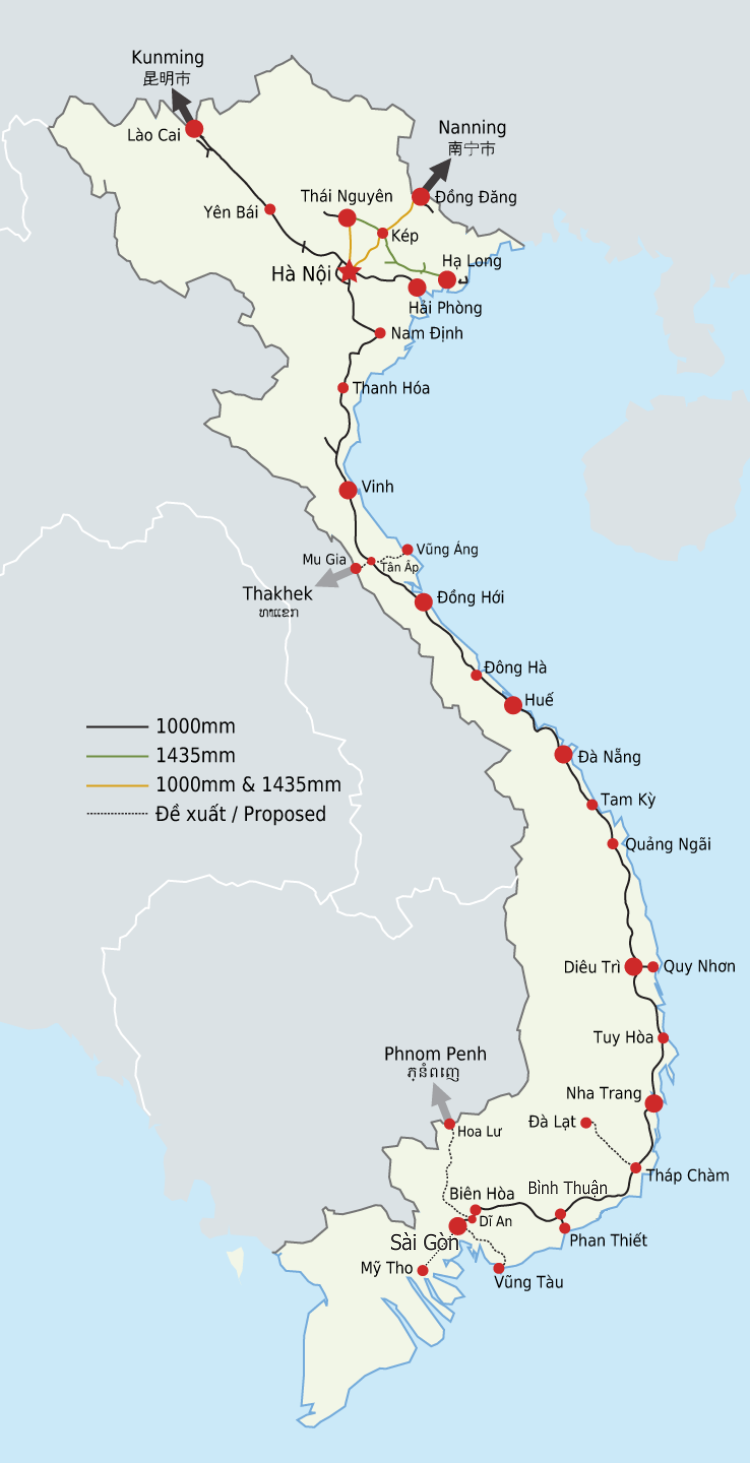
Map of Vietnam's railways

- Kunming–Haiphong railway (Lao Cai-Haiphong section), metre gauge railway from Lao Cai, on the border with China, to Haiphong via Hanoi (completed in 1910).
- North–South railway of Vietnam, metre gauge railway from Hanoi to Ho Chi Minh City (completed in 1936).
  - North–South express railway of Vietnam, 1,570 km (980 mi) standard gauge, high-speed rail, from Hanoi to Ho Chi Minh City. This line was initially planned by Vietnam and Japan using Shinkansen bullet train technology and financed in part by Japanese official development assistance. The project was scheduled to be built in stages from 2011 to 2020. In June 2010, Vietnam's National Assembly rejected the plan due to high construction costs, reportedly equal to about 50 percent of the country's GDP. The project was slated for re-consideration during the 2019 Vietnam's National Assembly Session owing to Vietnam's economy growing at a rate faster than expected, thus significantly decreasing the project's cost / GDP ratio.
  - In 2024, Prime Minister Phạm Minh Chính asked Chinese businesses to invest in developing Vietnam's rail sector and sought China's assistance in constructing the north–south high-speed railway as well as two additional high-speed railways further connecting Hanoi to the Chinese high-speed rail system.
- Ho Chi Minh City–Phnom Penh railway, 250 km (160 mi). This stretch of railway has never been built, and has been agreed to for feasibility studies by transport ministers from both Cambodia and Vietnam in 2020.

==== In Laos ====
- Savannakhet–Lao Bao railway, a 220 km (140 mi), electrified double track, high-speed railway from Savannakhet in Savannakhet Province, on the Thai border, to Lao Bảo in Vietnam's Quảng Trị Province. The project costs US$4 billion and is being built by the Giant Consolidated of Malaysia. A ground breaking ceremony was held in Ban Naxai on 18 December 2013. This line will also be extended to the port city of Danang in Vietnam, and give landlocked Laos an outlet to the South China Sea.
- Laos has been one of the strongest supports of the project given its desire to change from a land-locked to land-linked economy.

==== In Cambodia ====
- The Phnom Penh–Poipet railway, next to Aranyaprathet on the Thai border, was rebuilt and reopened on 5 July 2018. The original railway was destroyed in 1973 during the Cambodian Civil War.
- The disconnected rail link from Phnom Penh to Ho Chi Minh City is being reconsidered. The cost for construction is estimated around US$600 million and the Chinese government will fund most proportion of construction. The Cambodian government will deal with the relocation of people who will be affected by the proposed new railway construction.

==== In Thailand ====
- Thailand's Eastern Line railway connects the border town Aranyaprathet with Bangkok.

=== Central route ===
The central route including the Bangkok to Singapore section is approximately 3,900 km (2,400 mi) in length. A trip from Kunming to Singapore will take 30 hours in 2022, and 18 hours when completed in 2040. (compared to 80 hours from Vientiane to Singapore in January 2019). The line will be used to transport both passengers and cargo.

The central route consists of the following sections:

==== In China ====
- Kunming–Yuxi railway, from Kunming to Yuxi (completed in 1993, upgraded in 2016).
- Yuxi–Mohan railway, 503 km standard gauge railway from Yuxi to Mohan at the border with Laos. This line was originally planned to begin construction by the end of 2010, but was delayed. Construction of a railway logistics hub in Mohan began in early 2011. Construction began in 2016 and was completed in 2021.

==== In Laos ====
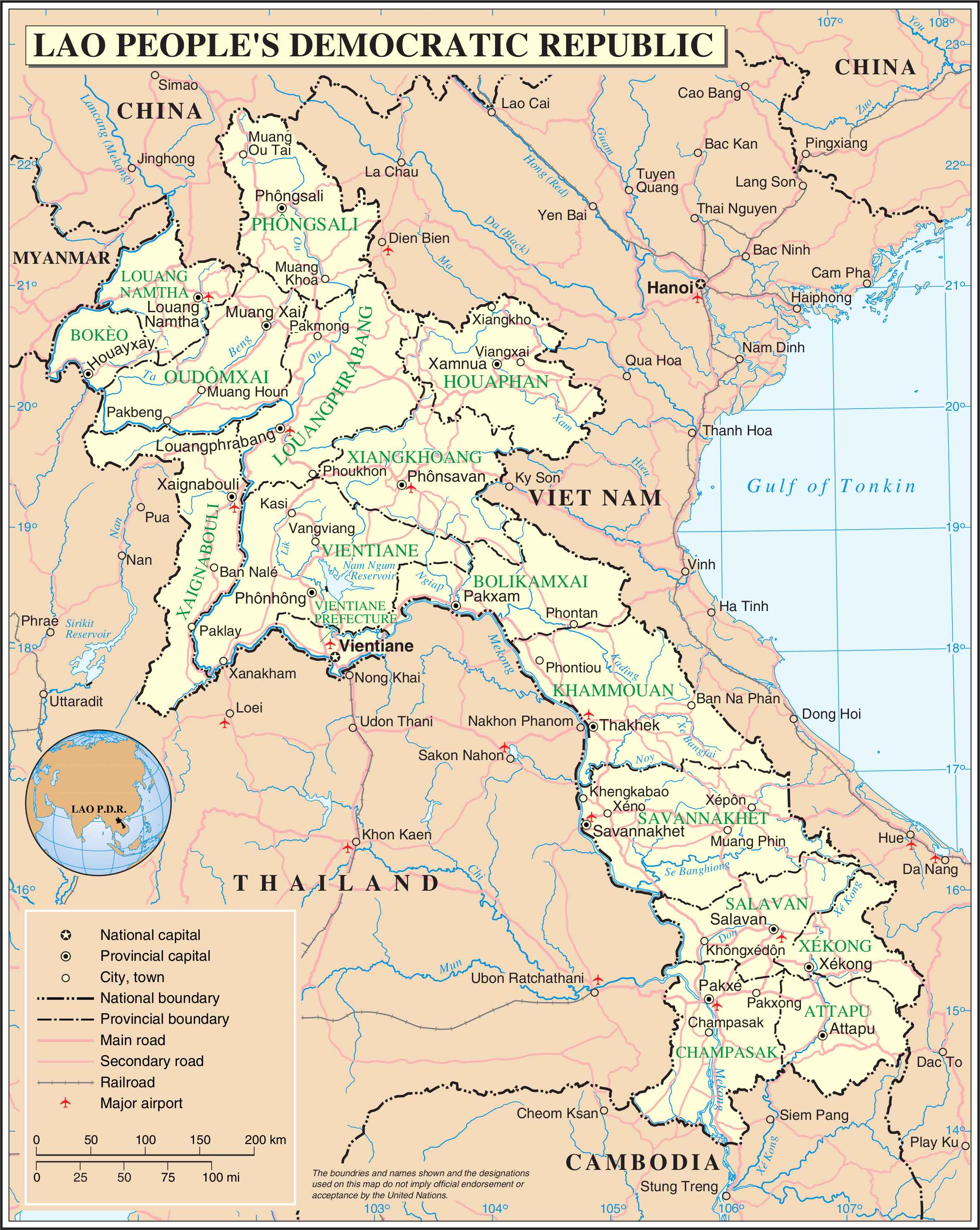
Map of Laos

- Boten–Vientiane railway, 421 km (262 mi) standard gauge line from Boten in Luang Namtha Province on the border with China, to Thanaleng, on the border with Thailand. This section opened in December 2021.

This line was originally planned as a high-speed rail joint-venture between the Laotian government and the China Railway Corporation, the Chinese state rail operator, and set to begin construction on 25 April 2011 but was delayed due to a corruption scandal that removed the Chinese railway minister, Liu Zhijun from office. The Laotian government then became the sole investor in the project, which is funded with a loan from the Export-Import Bank of China that would cover 70 percent of the project's cost of US$7 billion. The project was downgraded to a conventional speed railway with a maximum speed of 160 km/h instead of 200 km/h. As the terrain in Laos is mountainous, 76 bridges and 154 tunnels needed to be built. Unexploded bombs that have been dropped during the Vietnam War also needed to be removed.

The loan finance arrangement for this line was criticized by economists in the West as too expensive for Laos. There is also controversy over villagers whose houses will be moved to accommodate the new railway line. One village, Bopiat in northern Laos, has already been moved once to allow the construction of a casino. The National Assembly of Laos approved the project in October 2012, but the construction has not commenced because the Chinese state lender has been waiting since July 2013 for the Thai legislature to approve funding for the Thailand section of the railway line. On 22 July 2014, China's Exim Bank suspended loans to Laotian infrastructure projects, leaving the rail project in jeopardy. On 28 July 2014, at a meeting with Chinese Communist Party general secretary Xi Jinping in Beijing, Lao People's Revolutionary Party general secretary Choummaly Sayasone asked the Chinese government to continue its assistance of rail development in Laos.

In January 2016, Singapore's Straits Times reported that ground was broken on the project in December 2015. The first multiple unit train (EMU) was delivered to Vientiane on 16 October 2021, and the line opened on 3 December 2021.

==== In Thailand ====
- Northeastern Line (Thailand), a metre gauge railway connecting Bangkok with Nong Khai. Currently in operation.
  - Bangkok–Nong Khai high-speed railway, a planned high-speed railway from Bangkok to Nong Khai on the border with Laos. As of 2020, 2 of the contracts for the Bangkok-Nakhon Ratchasima section is under construction, while the Nakhon Ratchasima–Nong Khai have yet to enter the bidding phase. Costs of this section was to be determined by February 2016 with construction starting in May 2016. When completed, eight-car, 613 passenger CRH2G passenger trains will run on the line at a maximum speed of 250 km/h. At a speed of 180 km/h, it is estimated that passenger trains will run from Bangkok to Nong Khai in 230 minutes. HXD3B and HXD3C electric locomotives will be used to power freight trains travelling the line at 120 km/h.

[[File:Un-thailand.png|thumb|right|400px|Map of Thailand]

Planning for the high-speed line began during the administration of Prime Minister Abhisit Vejjajiva of the Democratic Party, which agreed to borrow US$400 million from China to purchase materials and expertise, and build one high speed line to Nong Khai Province to the north and another to the Padang Basar on the Malaysian border to the south. When Prime Minister Yingluck Shinawatra of the Puea Thai Party took office in August 2011, the Thai government initially scaled back those plans and proposed shorter lines that connected Thai cities but did not reach international frontiers. Supoj Sablorm, the secretary of the Thai Ministry of Transport, explained that Thailand was not in a rush to build a high-speed rail line to Laos because the Chinese-backed project in Laos had been delayed to beyond 2014. A year later in August 2012, the Thai government announced the plans to build four high-speed rail lines, including extensions to Nong Khai and Hat Yai by 2022. In October 2013, Chinese Premier Li Keqiang, on a visit to Thailand, promoted Chinese high-speed rail technology and offered loan packages for high-speed rail construction that are partially repayable with rice and rubber.

On 19 November 2013, the Thai Senate passed a bill that authorized the government to borrow US$69.5 billion to fund high-speed rail and other infrastructure projects in Thailand without going through the annual government budgeting process. The opposition Democratic Party challenged the spending bill in court and a judge expressed doubt about the necessity of high-speed rail for Thailand. The ensuing political protests in Bangkok, which began in December 2013 and continued through May 2014, has paralyzed the Thai government and prevented further decision-making of the rail project.

On 30 July 2014, Thai army chief General Prayut Chan-o-cha, whose forces seized control of the government through a bloodless coup in May, announced plans to build two high-speed rail lines as part of a 741.4 billion baht transportation program. The Nong Khai to Map Ta Phut line, 737 kilometres (458 mi) in length, would run from the Laotian border at Thanaleng to the Gulf of Thailand. The Chiang Khong to Ban Phachi line, 655 kilometres (407 mi) in length, would run from Chiang Rai near the northern tip of Thailand to Ayutthaya just north of Bangkok. The two lines would allow trains to travel at a top speed of 160 km/h. Construction is scheduled to begin in 2015 and is to be completed in 2021.

In November 2014, after a meeting between Li Keqiang and Prayut Chan-o-cha, China agreed to lend Thailand funds to build dual-track standard gauge mid-speed railways on the Bangkok-Nong Khai, Bangkok-Map Ta Phut, and Kaeng Khoi–Map Ta Phut routes. The loans could be repaid with rice and rubber. On 4 December 2014, the Thai National Legislative Assembly voted 187–0 with seven abstentions to approve loans for the Nong Khai-Map Ta Phut and Kaeng Khoi-Bangkok lines. China would undertake construction and development of the lines but would not receive land use rights along the routes. On 19 December 2014, the two countries signed a memorandum to build the railways.

As of December 2015, China and Thailand have agreed to build the 845 km double-track rail routes connecting Bangkok–Kaeng Khoi–Nakhon Ratchasima–Khon Kaen–Udon Thani–Nong Khai and a second section connecting Kaeng Khoi–Map Ta Phut. The two parties have not yet reached agreement on financing for the project.

In March 2020, the Thai government committed to a US$21 billion railway expansion plan that will include a high speed rail from China to Singapore through Bangkok via the Laotian border near Vientiane.

As of March 2021, the proposed completion of the high speed section from Bangkok to Nakhon Ratchasima is early 2027. The section from Nakhon Ratchasima to Nong Khai has not been bid.

=== Western route ===
The western route consists of the following railway sections:

==== In China ====
Double-track construction of the Kunming to Guangtong section of the Chengdu–Kunming railway at Anning in 2012.

- Chengdu–Kunming railway, 115 km (71 mi) from Kunming to Guangtong (completed in 1971, new double-track line completed in 2022)
- Guangtong–Chuxiong–Dali railway, 213 km (132 mi) from Guangtong to Dali (completed in 2018), and
- Dali–Ruili railway, 336 km (209 mi) from Dali to Ruili on the border with Myanmar (under construction since 2011, Dali-Baoshan section has been completed in July 2022, while Baoshan-Pupiao section started construction in 2022 and will be followed by the final sector, Pupiao-Ruili.

==== In Myanmar ====
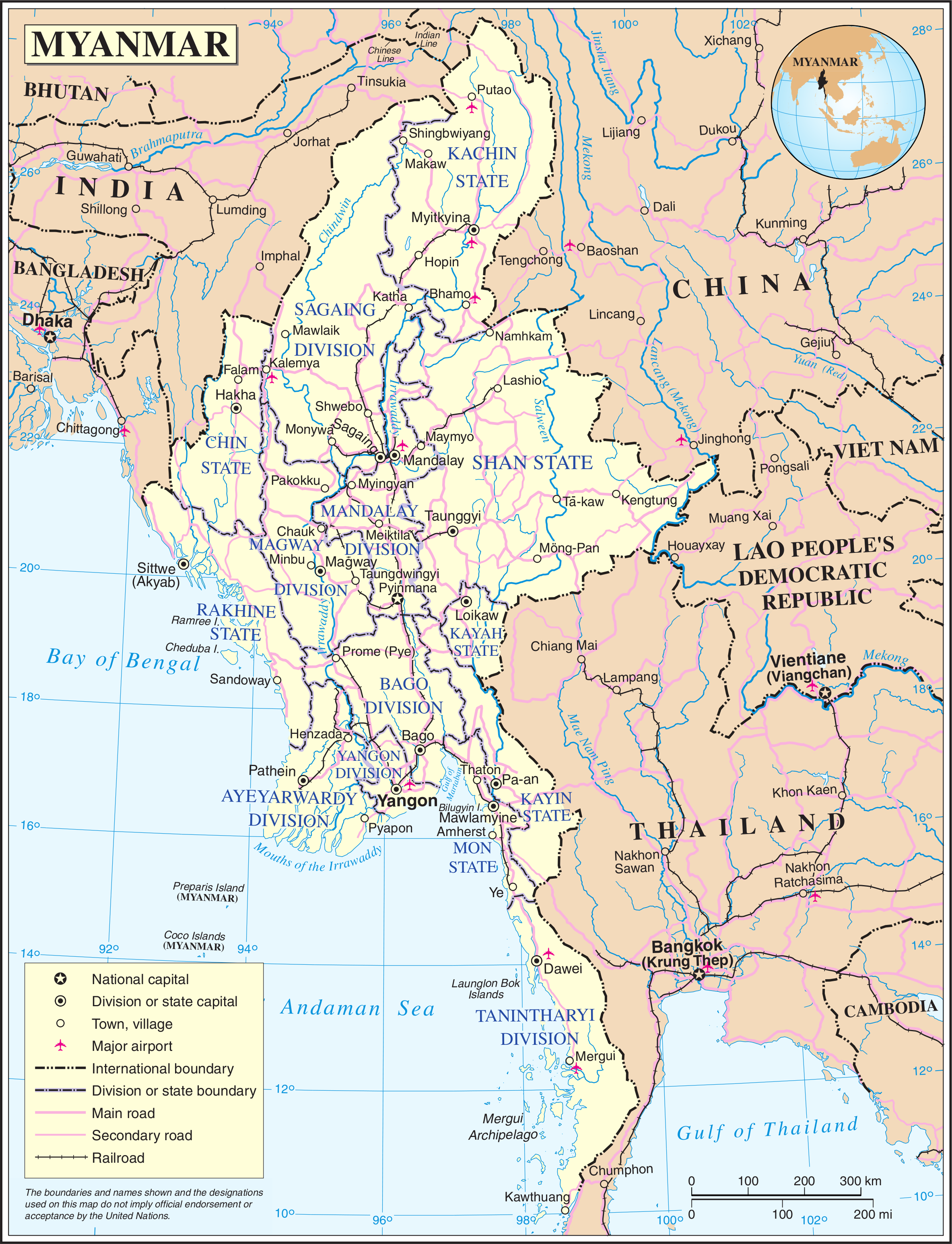
Map of Myanmar

- Kunming–Yangon railway (Myanmar section), from Muse in the Shan State on the border with China to Yangon with maximum train speeds of 170–200 km/h.

The Kunming–Yangon high-speed railway forms a portion of the 1,215 km (755 mi) high-speed railway from Kunming to Rakhine State on the Bay of Bengal.

In late November 2010, Chinese state media reported that the railway would begin construction in about two months. But in March 2011, the Chinese Commerce Minister Chen Deming stated that the project was delayed due to the first elections in Myanmar in 20 years and differences in the railway gauge of the two countries. He explained the Chinese rail developers were waiting for the new cabinet in Myanmar to form and expressed hope that work on the line would begin before the end of 2011. On 18 July 2014, the Myanmar government cancelled the project, citing opposition from civil rights groups, villagers and the general public.

In the summer of 2018, plans for the China-Myanmar railway were resumed.

- Yangon–Myitkyina railway, from Yangon to Myitkyina, near the border with China (existing railway).

In December 2013, the Myanmar government began to discuss the upgrade of the existing Yangon-Myitkyina railway with the Asian Development Bank and the government of South Korea.

- Yangon–Mandalay railway, from Yangon to Mandalay (existing railway).

In December 2013, Japanese media reported that the Myanmar and Japanese governments had reached an agreement to upgrade this line.

- Former Burma Railway

In May 2012, the railway Minister Aung Min of Myanmar announced that a feasibility study would be undertaken to rebuild the 105-km stretch of the Thai–Burma railway from the Three Pagoda Pass to the Thai border. The railway could be reopened, he said, with international assistance and promote development in the region and peace with ethnic Shan and Karen rebels in the border areas.

==== In Thailand ====
- Parts of the Burma Railway are still in operation, connecting Nam Tok in western Thailand with Bangkok.

=== Bangkok–Singapore section ===
==== In Thailand ====
- Southern Line (Thailand), a metre gauge railway connecting Bangkok with Hat Yai, with a branch line leading to Padang Besar on the Thailand-Malaysian border. Currently in operation.

==== In Malaysia and Singapore ====
- KTM West Coast railway line, a metre gauge railway connecting Padang Besar with Kuala Lumpur and Johor Bahru, stretching across the entire Malaysian west coast. A shuttle service links Johor Bahru and Singapore's Woodlands Train Checkpoint.

The KTM line from Padang Besar to Gemas was electrified and double tracked in 2015, followed by the stretch from Gemas to Johor Bahru in December 2025, bringing down journey times from Woodlands North in Singapore to KL Sentral to about 4 hours.

According to PLANMalaysia, a northern high-speed rail corridor will be built along North-South Expressway and the stations will be at Tanjung Malim, Tapah, Ipoh, Taiping and terminated at Butterworth.

==== Cancelled high-speed rail plan ====
In 2013, the governments of Malaysia and Singapore agreed to build a high-speed rail line between Kuala Lumpur to Singapore that was scheduled to open in 2026. However, shortly after winning the May 2018 election, the incoming Malaysian prime minister Mahathir Mohamad said he would reconsider the project. Among revisions being explored to reduce costs, was to align the route to the existing meter gauge Keretapi Tanah Melayu (KTM) line and lay a standard gauge track in parallel, with a fork running to Jurong East so that bilateral agreement is not violated, to allow trains running at 200 km/h, cutting journey time between Kuala Lumpur and Singapore to 130 minutes. Stations were planned for Bandar Malaysia in Kuala Lumpur, Bangi-Putrajaya, Labu (Seremban), Muar, Batu Pahat, Iskandar Puteri and Jurong East. The plan was cancelled after 2 extensions requested by Malaysia, with the project allowed to lapse on 31 December 2020.

== See also ==
- High Speed Rail
- Trans-Asian Railway
- High Speed Rail in China
- Kuala Lumpur–Singapore high-speed rail
