= Dali Railway =

Dali Railway could refer to:

- the shortform name of the Dali–Lijiang Railway, a railway between Dali City and Lijiang in Yunnan province, China

Or, any railway that passes through Dali City, including, the Dali-Lijiang Railway as well as:

- Guangtong–Dali Railway, between Guangtong and Dali City;
- Dali-Ruili Railway, between Dali City and Ruili, in Yunnan.
