= Ho Chi Minh City–Phnom Penh railway =

Proposed international railway in Southeast Asia

Overview
- Status: Planned
- Locale: Vietnam, Cambodia
- Termini: Ho Chi Minh City, Vietnam; Phnom Penh, Cambodia

Service
- Type: Heavy rail

Technical
- Line length: 250 km (160 mi)
- Track gauge: 1,000 mm (3 ft 3 3/8 in) metre gauge (expected)

The Ho Chi Minh City–Phnom Penh railway is a proposed railway between Ho Chi Minh City, Vietnam and Phnom Penh, Cambodia. The railway is envisioned to complete the missing link on the eastern line of the Kunming–Singapore railway.

Despite both Cambodia and Vietnam being both part of French Indochina, the railway was never built during colonial times. Plans to connect Cambodia and Vietnam by rail was first mooted in 2009, to which the Cambodian government and China Railway Group launched a feasibility technical study to build a railway between Phnom Penh and Snuol, close to the Vietnamese city of Loc Ninh where it would connect to the Saigon–Lộc Ninh railway. During the 17th ASEAN Summit in October 2010, China voiced support for the railway. As late as 2015, the railway was planned but still not built, with other railway lines in Cambodia given higher priority.

In 2018, the transport ministers of Cambodia and Vietnam have agreed to build a railway between Phnom Penh and Ho Chi Minh City, but this time passing through the border town of Bavet where the Vietnam-Cambodia international crossing is located. The agreement was renewed in 2020.

== See also ==
- Rail transport in Cambodia
- Rail transport in Vietnam
  - Saigon–Lộc Ninh railway
- Kunming–Singapore railway
