= Baoshan railway station =

Baoshan station or Baoshan railway station may refer to:

- Baoshan railway station (Taiwan), a railway station in Taoyuan District, Taoyuan City, Taiwan
- Baoshan railway station (Yunnan), a railway station in Longyang District, Baoshan, Yunnan, China
- Baoshan station (Jinan Metro), a metro station in Licheng District, Jinan, Shandong Province, China
- Shanghai Baoshan railway station, a railway station under construction on the Husutong railway, in Baoshan District, Shanghai, China
