= Dazhushan Tunnel =

Railway tunnel in China which connects to the China-Myanmar border

Coordinates: 25.2627993°N 99.2522202°E

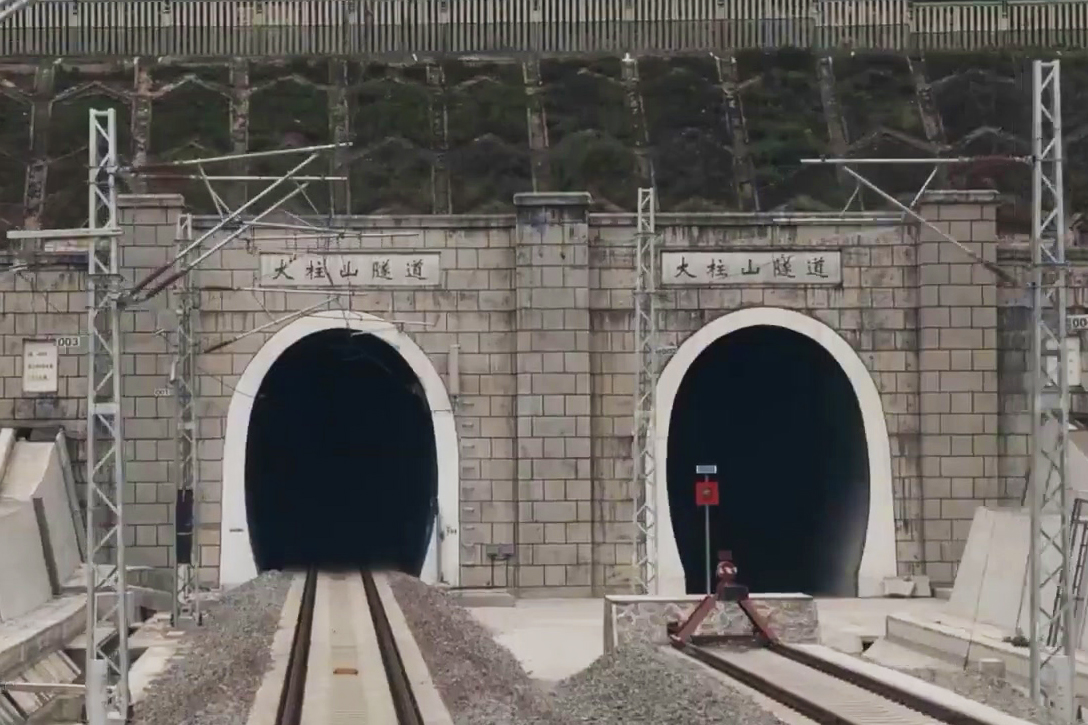
- Interactive map of Dazhushan Tunnel

Overview

Technical
- Line length: 14.484 km (9.000 mi)
- Track gauge: 1,435 mm (4 ft 8 1/2 in) standard gauge

The Dazhushan Tunnel (大柱山隧道) is a 14.484 km (9.0 mi) railway tunnel in Baoshan, Yunnan, China as part of the Dali–Ruili railway. Construction of the tunnel began in August 2008 and was carried out by the First Engineering Bure Crec (中铁一局). Its construction was expected to take five years, but because of extreme geological conditions along its alignment, completion took place on 28 April 2020, after 12 years of construction. As another tunnel, Gaoligongshan Tunnel, along the railway line was still under construction, it did not enter service until 2022.

The justification of this tunnel is the geopolitical importance of the Dali–Ruili railway. While there were already gas and oil pipelines linking the oil refinery in Yunnan to the port of Bay of Bengal in Myanmar, a direct railway link between China and Myanmar was seen as a doubly secure means for China to access the Bay of Bengal in case the territorial disputes in the South China Sea are resolved unfavorably to China.
