= Lijiang railway station =

Railway station in Yunnan

Lijiang 丽江
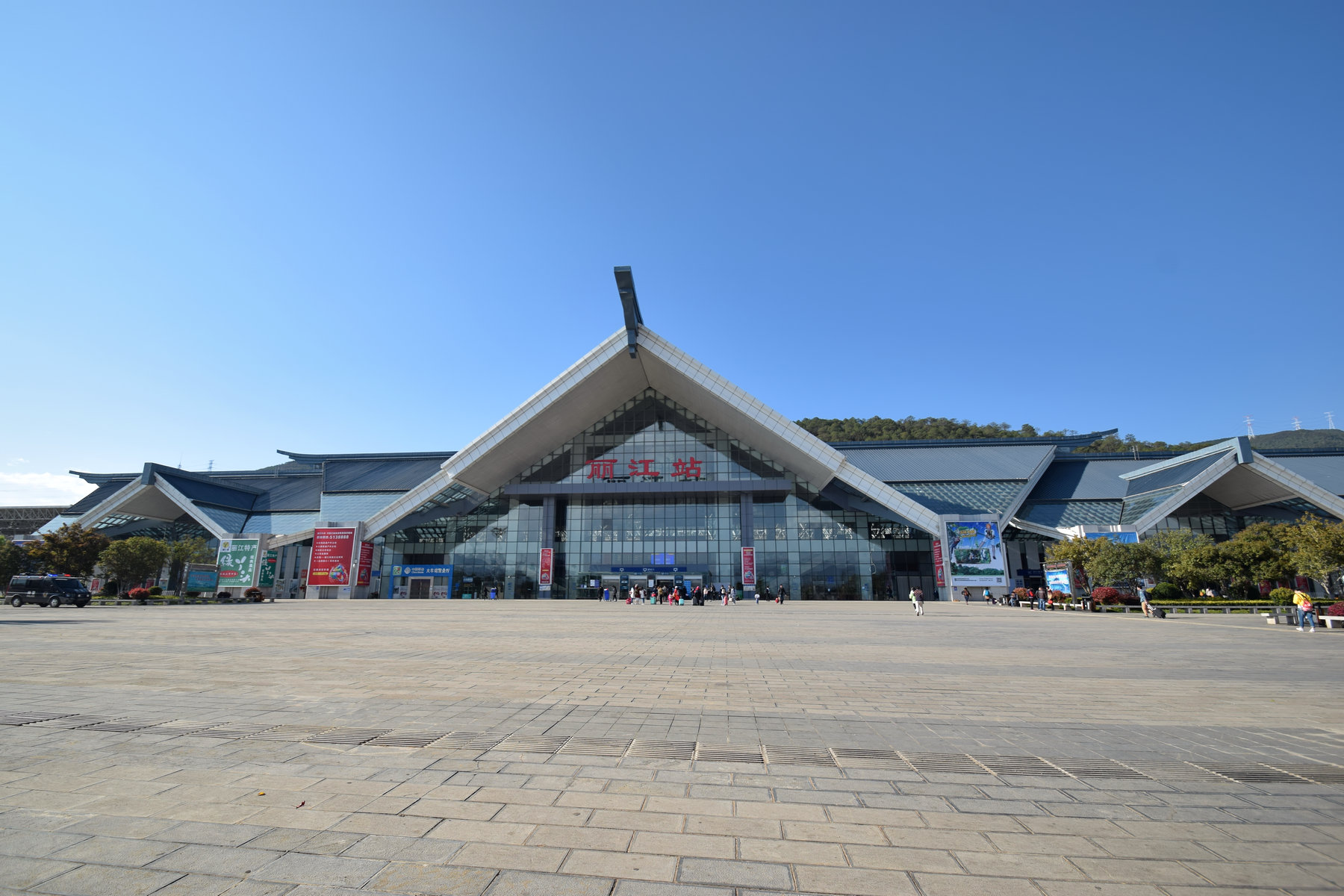

General information
- Location: Yulong Naxi Autonomous County, Lijiang, Yunnan; China
- Coordinates: 26.8105360°N 100.2522551°E
- Lines: Dali–Lijiang railway; Lijiang–Shangri-La railway

History
- Opened: 29 October 2011
Location

Lijiang railway station (Chinese: 丽江站) is a railway station in Yulong Naxi Autonomous County, Lijiang, Yunnan, China. It is the northern terminus of the Dali–Lijiang railway and the southern terminus of the Lijiang–Shangri-La railway.

== History ==
The railway station opened on 29 October 2011.
