= Guangtong–Chuxiong–Dali railway =

Railway line in China

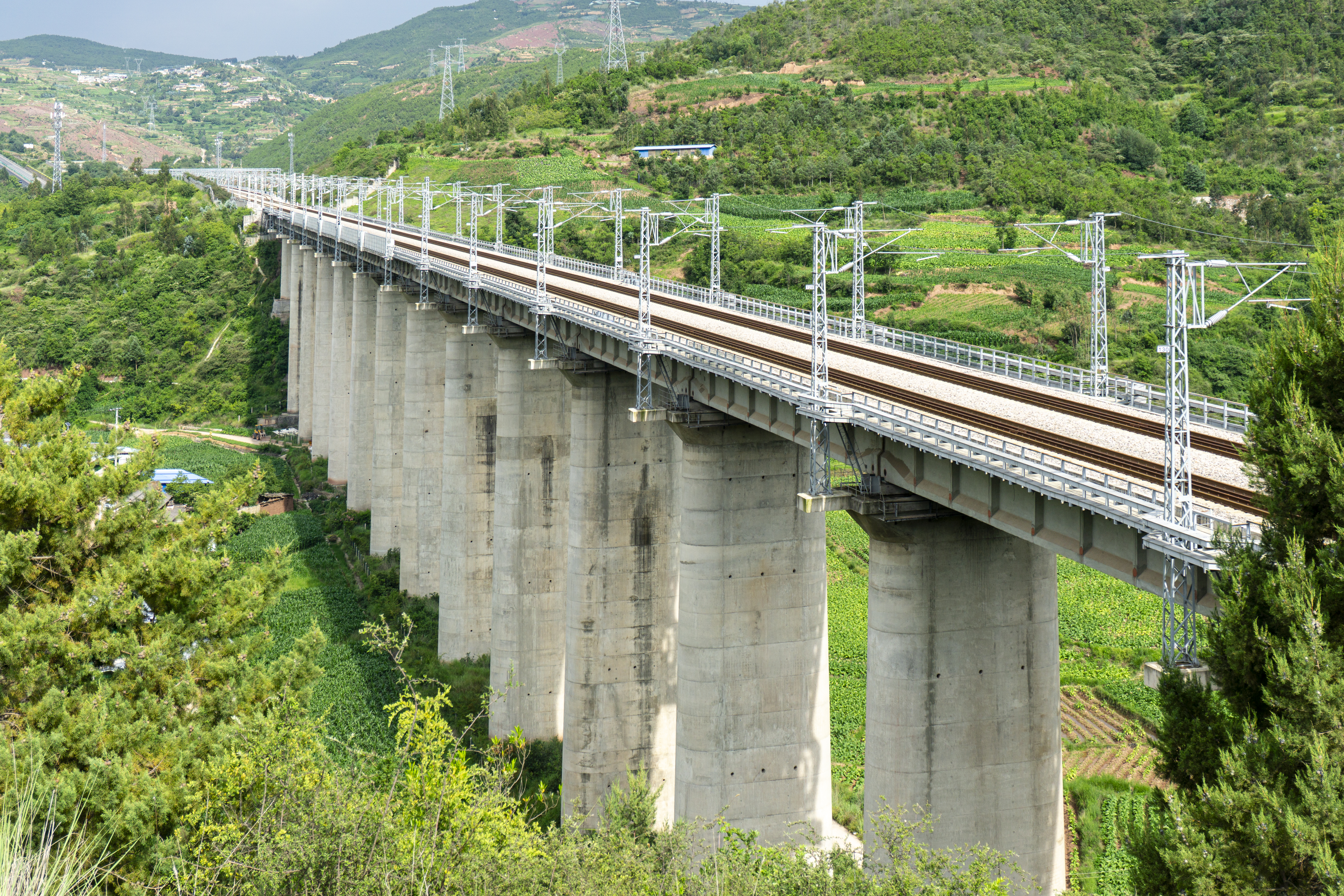

Overview
- Other name: Kunchuda railway
- Native name: 昆楚大铁路
- Status: Operational
- Owner: China Railway
- Locale: Yunnan, China
- Termini: Guangtong North; Dali

Service
- Type: Heavy rail
- Operator(s): China Railway Kunming Group

History
- Opened: 1 July 2018
- Completed: 2 April 2018

Technical
- Line length: 213 km (132 mi)
- Number of tracks: 2
- Track gauge: 1,435 mm (4 ft 8 1/2 in) standard gauge
- Minimum radius: Generally 3,500 m (2.2 mi) or 2,800 m (1.7 mi) in difficult areas
- Electrification: 25 kV 50 Hz AC overhead line
- Operating speed: 200 km/h (120 mph)
- Maximum incline: 0.6%

The Guangtong–Chuxiong–Dali railway or Kunchuda railway (Chinese: 昆楚大铁路; pinyin: Kūnchǔdà tiělù) is located in the northern part of Yunnan Province, China. It runs from east to west through Kunming City, Chuxiong Yi Autonomous Prefecture and Dali Bai Autonomous Prefecture. It is 328 kilometres (204 mi) long and is part of the China–Myanmar international railway corridor and the western route of the proposed Kunming–Singapore railway. When it was under construction, it was called the "Guangtong–Dali Railway Capacity Expansion and Reconstruction Project" and the "Chengdu–Kunming railway Railway Capacity Expansion and Reconstruction Project: Guangtong–Kunming Double Track". After its completion, it was briefly called the Kun-Guang Railway and was finally named the "Kunchuda railway" (a contraction of Kunming–Chuxiong–Dali railway) when it was in operation.

== Background ==
Due to the low technical standards of the Guangtong–Dali railway (Guangda railway), which opened in 1999, only nine pairs of passenger trains can pass through it each day.

=== Pan-Asian Railway Project ===
The Southeast Asian section of the Trans-Asian Railway was originally proposed by Malaysian Prime Minister Mahathir Mohamad in 1995 to connect several ASEAN countries. Later, it was responded to by other Asian countries and expanded into a larger plan. Finally, in 2010, the plan was finally implemented after the signing of the "Intergovernmental Agreement on the Asian Railway Network". In the plan, there are three corridors connecting China's southwest region and Southeast Asian countries. The western route runs from Yunnan Province, China through Myanmar, Thailand, Malaysia to Singapore. The route within Yunnan Province is Kunming–Chuxiong–Dali–Ruili.

== Construction ==
=== Guangkun section ===
The construction of the 106.3 km (66.1 mi)-long Guangkun section of the Chengdu-Kunming Railway reconstruction project began on 18 October 2007. The initial design speed was 160 km/h (99 mph) and the conditions for increasing the speed to 200 km/h (120 mph) were reserved. On 26 September 2012, the 7.6 km (4.7 mi)-long Laodongshan Tunnel, the key project of the entire line, was successfully completed. On 31 March 2013, after more than five years of work and successfully solving 13 large-scale water inrushes, China Railway's 16th Bureau successfully completed the 13.2 km (8.2 mi)-long Xiuning Tunnel, the longest of the Guangkun double-track tunnels. The Guangkun double-track section was officially opened for operation on 27 December 2013.

On 20 December 2017, the Guangkun double-track line began to be renovated to increase the operating speed to 200 km/h and permit the operation of high-speed trains from Kunming to Dali. Since the Guangkun double-track line has been put into operation, the Kunming Railway Bureau took advantage of the "window period" between trains to renovate the line and a series of facilities and equipment such as communication signals and power supply.

=== Chuda section ===
The Chuxiong-Dali section is 175 km (109 mi)-long with a designed speed of 200 km/h (120 mph). It is a Class I double-track electrified railway that passes through Chuxiong Yi Autonomous Prefecture and Dali Bai Autonomous Prefecture in Yunnan Province. There are 80 bridges and 44 tunnels along the line, with 63.6% of the line composed of bridges and tunnels. The electrification facilities include 500 km (310 mi) of overhead lines, 5 traction substations and 429 km (267 mi) of power lines. On 13 October 2009, China's National Development and Reform Commission approved 18 key projects for the Western Development program, including the double-track railway from Chuxiong to Dali. On 10 September 2010, a mobilisation meeting for the project was held in Chuxiong Prefecture, attended by a number of leaders from the Ministry of Railways and Yunnan Province. Among them, Bai Enpei announced the start of the project, and Wen Qingliang reported on the project preparations at the mobilisation meeting. In December 2012, as part of the Guangda Railway capacity expansion and reconstruction project, the Chuda section started construction, with an estimated cost of RMB 13.936 billion at the time of construction. The units involved in the construction included China Railway's 12th Bureau and 17th Bureau.

By August 2016, 39 of the 44 tunnels on the entire line had been completed. In March 2013, construction of the 10.2 km (6.3 mi) Xianghe Tunnel, located at the junction of Dali City and Xiangyun County, began. The China Railway 17th Bureau Group was responsible for the construction. The tunnel has a maximum burial depth of 705 m (2,313 ft) and passes through 9 large mountain fracture zones. 45% of the sections are risky sections. The construction site seeps 110,000 m^{3} (140,000 cu yd) of water every day, and geological disasters occur from time to time. The construction unit avoided more than 20 dangerous situations during the construction, and finally the tunnel was completed on 6 February, five years later. The longest tunnel in the Chuda section is the 13.8 km (8.6 mi)-long Pupeng No. 1 Tunnel. The surrounding area has very complex geological conditions and a very high risk of geological disasters. There are also other important facilities such as military optical cables, the China-Myanmar oil pipeline, local power pipelines and National Highway 312. Thanks to the efforts of the 12th Bureau, this tunnel was successfully completed on 29 March 2017.

The construction of the beams for the Chuda section began in March 2016 and by June 2017, a total of 1,672 beams had been erected, accounting for 85.6% of the total. All the piers and abutments were also completed on 22 June 2017.

On 14 July 2017, the prototype project of the contact network of the Chuda section passed the acceptance inspection, and the electrification facilities of the Chuda section began to be fully constructed.

On 2 April 2018, the entire Chuda section was completed.

== Operations ==
On 29 March 2018, a Shaoshan 3 electric locomotive ran back and forth between Guangtong North Station and Dali Station, marking the successful completion of the hot-rolling test on the entire line. On 18 April, a high-speed comprehensive inspection train departed from Guangtong North Station and began a nearly three-month joint commissioning. Starting from 7 June, the entire line began trial operation according to the operating diagram. At 8:12 on 1 July, the first EMU, D8660, named "Dali", departed from Kunming Station and arrived in Dali at 10:00. The line was officially put into service.

=== Trains ===
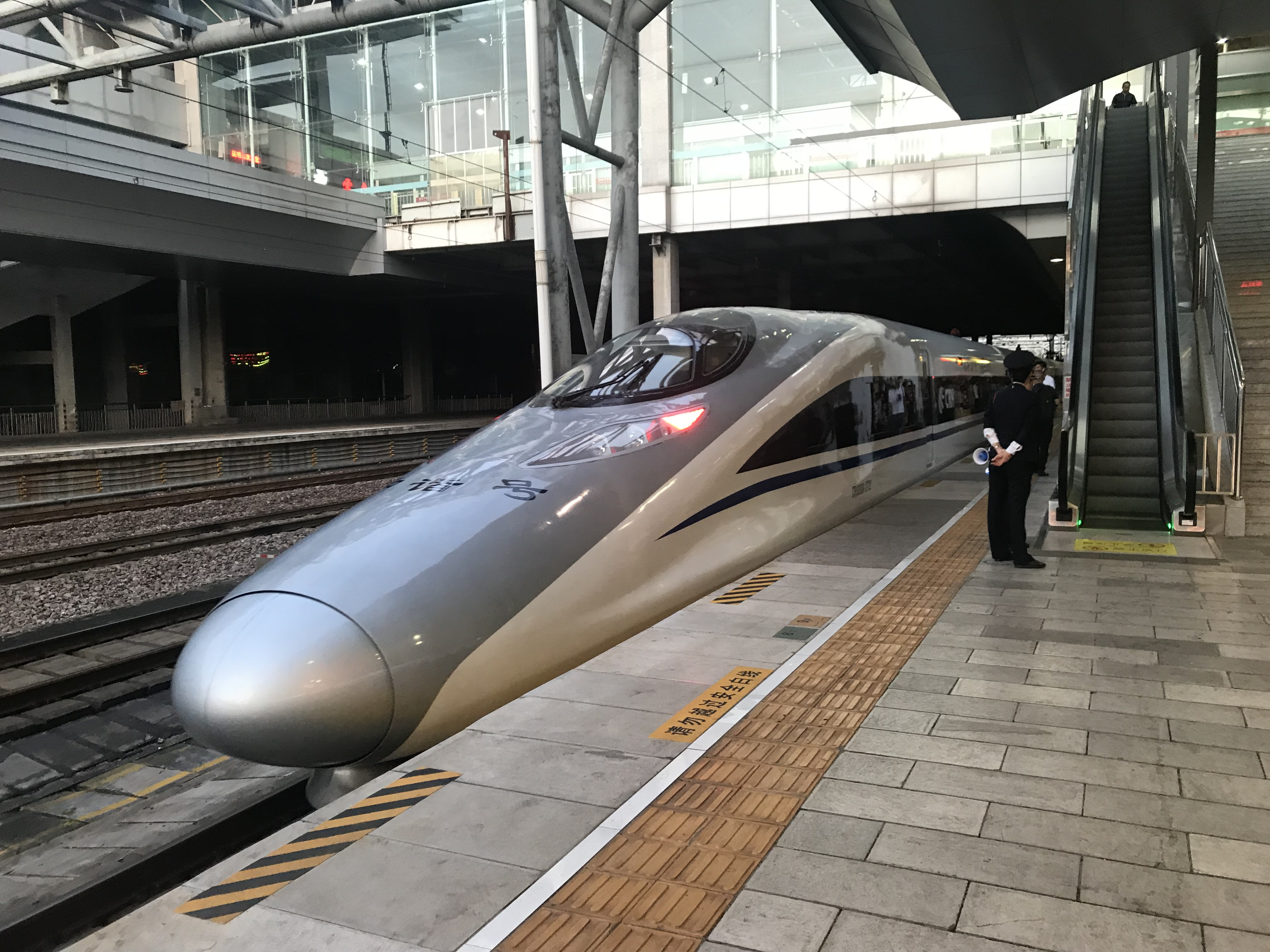
CRH380A set from Kunming South to Dali stops at Kunming

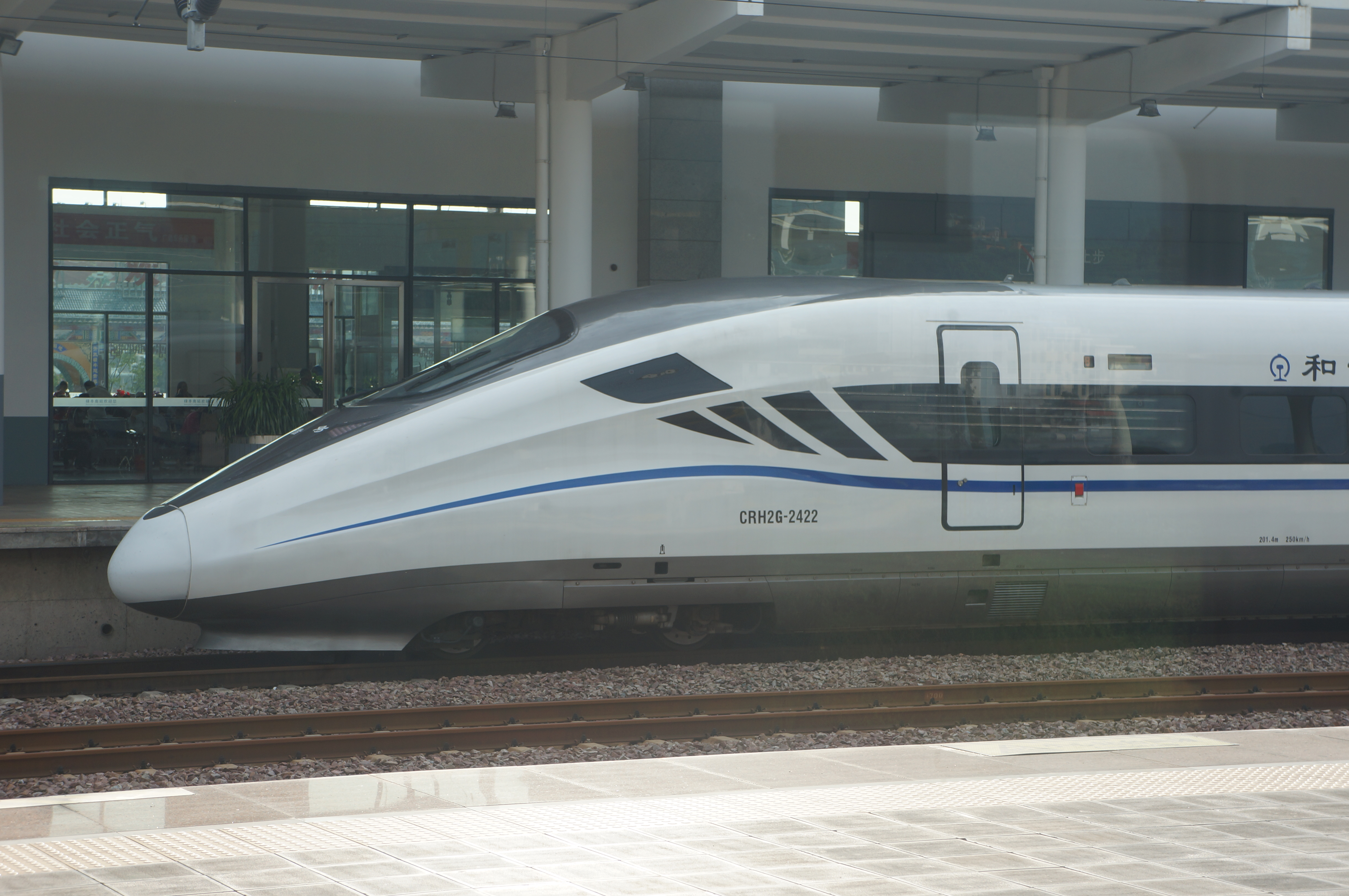
CRH2G set from Chuxiong to Kunming South at Lufeng South

In the initial period of operation, the line planned to have 21.5 pairs of trains running between Kunming South Station and Dali every day, of which 19.5 pairs were daily trains and 2 pairs were weekend trains, with the shortest travel time being 112 minutes. On average, there was one train every 25 minutes throughout the day, with the shortest departure interval being only 12 minutes. To celebrate the "China Chuxiong 2023 Yi Torch Festival", China Railway Kunming Bureau Group Co., Ltd. decided to add 2 pairs of Torch Festival high-speed trains between Kunming and Chuxiong from 9 to 12 August 2023.

=== Featured Services ===
As there are many ethnic minority communities along the line, the train broadcasts on this line use not only standard Chinese and English, but also Bai and Loloish languages. During holidays, train attendants also wear the distinctive costumes of the ethnic minorities along the line.

== Influence ==
After the opening of the Kunming-Chuxiong Railway, western Yunnan was connected to China's high-speed rail network, greatly reducing the travel time to Kunming and the southeastern coastal areas . At the same time, the Pan-Asia Railway and China-Myanmar Railway plans also moved forward.
