= Dali–Ruili railway =

Railway in Yunnan, China

Overview
- Other name: Darui railway
- Native name: 大瑞铁路
- Owner: China Railway
- Locale: Yunnan Province
- Termini: Dali; Baoshan (as of July 2022)
- Continues from: Guangtong–Dali railway; Dali–Lijiang railway
- Stations: 5 (as of July 2022)

Service
- Type: Inter-city rail
- Operator(s): China Railway Kunming Group
- Rolling stock: China Railway CR200J

History
- Commenced: 1 June 2008
- Opened: 19 July 2022

Technical
- Line length: 336.39 km (209.02 mi)
- Number of tracks: 1
- Character: Elevated
- Track gauge: 1,435 mm (4 ft 8 1/2 in) standard gauge
- Electrification: 25 kV 50 Hz AC
- Operating speed: 140 km/h (87 mph)

The Dali–Ruili railway or Darui railway (大瑞铁路), is a single-track electrified railway under construction in Yunnan Province of Southwest China. The line is slated to run 336.39 km (209 mi) from Dali to Ruili on the border with Myanmar. The line traverses rugged terrain, and bridges and tunnels will account for 75% of the total track length, including the 34.5 km Gaoligongshan Tunnel through the Gaoligong Mountains.

Construction began in May 2011 and was scheduled to take six years. However, this has been repeatedly delayed, and as of 2019, the railway is scheduled to open only in 2022. The initial section from Dali to Baoshan opened on 22 July 2022. In the same year, the construction of the sector from Baoshan to Pupiao started.

The line will have a design speed of 140 kilometres per hour (87 mph). Cities and counties along route include Dali, Yangbi Yi Autonomous County, Yongping County, Baoshan, Pupiao (蒲缥镇), Mangshi and Ruili.

== History ==
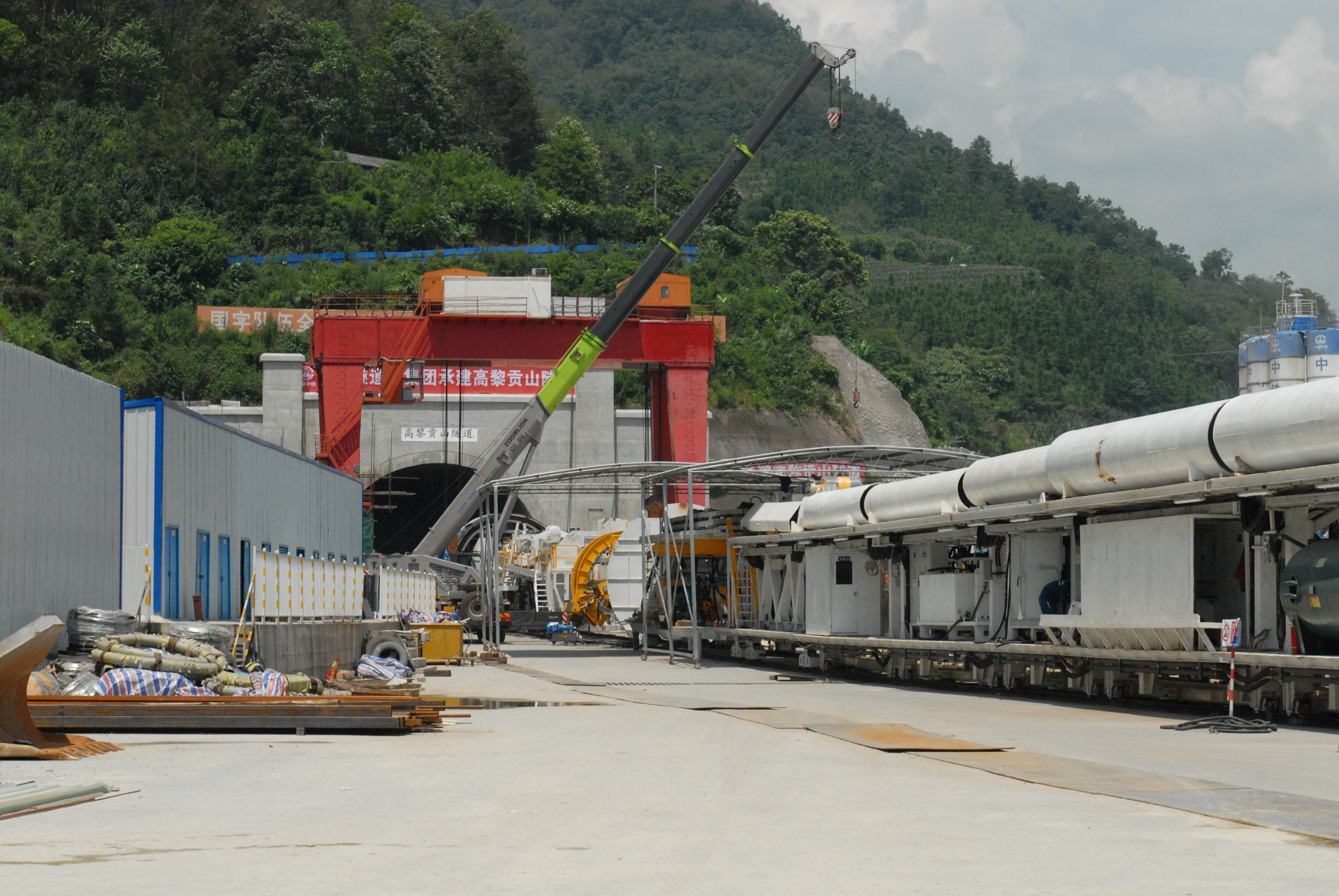
Gaoligong Mountain Rail Tunnel under construction near Mangshi

As early as 1938, the British planned to build the Yunnan–Burma railway to connect British rule in Burma with Yunnan Province, but were unable to complete the project.

Originally, the Chinese government proposed a rail connection between Kunming, China and Kyaukpyu, Myanmar. The railway was planned to follow the route of the existing Sino-Myanmar pipelines. After protests in Myanmar, the part of the railway in Myanmar was cancelled. Only the Chinese part of the line between Dali and Ruili will now be constructed.

Construction on the Darui Line began in 2008. In August 2012, the project received an additional investment of ¥5 billion, owing to the difficulty of tunneling through the rugged terrain, particularly the Dazhushan Mountain Tunnel. The huge rivers and geology have given the tunnel the moniker "World's Most Difficult Tunnel".

== Stations in operation ==
Station Name		Connections	Distance km	Location
English	Chinese	Connections	Distance km	Location
Dali	大理			Yunnan
Yangbi	漾濞			Yunnan
Yongpingxian	永平县			Yunnan
Baoshan North (freight)	保山北			Yunnan
Baoshan	保山			Yunnan
Pupiao	蒲缥			Yunnan

Note: Pupiao station was opened on 15 April 2026 with distance between Baoshan to Pupiao is 18.672 km, including 16.097-km Baoshan tunnel (保山隧道)

== Future Development ==
=== Trans-Asian Railway ===
The Dali–Ruili railway may someday form the western route of China's rail link with Southeast Asia, part of the Trans-Asian Railway. The authorities of the two countries considered the possibility of connecting it with the railways of Myanmar. In 2018, another agreement was signed between the two countries' railway agencies for a feasibility study for a 431 km long railway connection from Mandalay to Muse (the Burmese town opposite Ruili).

The latest report in June 2022 stated that the new EIA for the Burmese side of the China–Myanmar Railway will be shortened to 409.69 km by adding 47 more bridges and viaducts (bringing the total from 77 to 124), while the number of tunnels will be reduced from 77 to 60.

This Muse–Mandalay railway line will pass the following stations:

- Muse (木姐 (Chinese)/မူဆယ်မြို့ (Burmese)/မူႇၸေႊ (Shan))
- Kutkai (贵概 (Chinese)/ ကွတ်ခိုင် (Burmese))
- Hsenwi (AKA Theinni) (သိန္နီ (Burmese) / သႅၼ်ဝီ (Shan))
- Lashio (腊戍 (Chinese) /လားရှို (Burmese))
- Hsipaw (昔卜 (Chinese) / သီပေ (Burmese))
- Kyaukme (皎梅 (Chinese) / ကျောက်မဲ (Burmese))
- Nawnghkio (瑙丘 (Chinese) /နောင်ချို (Burmese))
- Pyin Oo Lwin (彬乌伦 (Chinese) / ပြင်ဦးလွင် (Burmese) / ပၢင်ႇဢူလူင် (Shan))
- Mandalay (曼德勒 (Chinese) /မန္တလေး (Burmese))

There will be 4 major bridges and viaducts along this railway line:

- New Goteik viaduct that passed through the 300-m deep valley which takes 48 months to be done. This viaduct is in between Nawnghkio (瑙丘 (Chinese) /နောင်ချို (Burmese)) and Pyin Oo Lwin (彬乌伦 (Chinese) / ပြင်ဦးလွင် (Burmese) / ပၢင်ႇဢူလူင် (Shan)) which takes 48 months to be done. This will supersede the existing 689-m Goteik viaduct which had been erected through 250-m deep valley by American engineers and workers in 1900.
- The New Sino-Burmese Friendship Bridge across Mao river (AKA Shweli River / 瑞丽江 (Chinese) / ရွှေလီမြစ် (Burmese) / ၼမ်ႉမၢဝ်း (Shan)) which is the border between China and Myanmar which takes 26 months to be done and to connect Muse (木姐 (Chinese)/မူဆယ်မြို့ (Burmese) /မူႇၸေႊ (Shan) with Ruili (瑞丽 (Chinese) /瑞麗 (Traditional Chinese) / ရွှေလီ (Burmese)/ မိူင်းမၢဝ် (Shan)).
- Bridge across Nam Ma river at Hsipaw township (ၼမ်ႉတူႈ (Burmese)) in Hsipaw township (昔卜 (Chinese)/သီပေ (Burmese)) in Kyaukme district (皎梅 (Chinese)/ ကျောက်မဲ (Burmese)) which takes 24 months to be done.
- Bridge across Nam Tu river (ၼမ်ႉတူႈ (Burmese)) in Hsipaw township (昔卜 (Chinese)/သီပေ (Burmese)) in Kyaukme district (皎梅 (Chinese)/ ကျောက်မဲ (Burmese)) which takes 23 months to be done.

However, the timeframe and schedule are not certain due to the ongoing civil war that started in 2021 in Myanmar.

== See also ==
- List of railways in China
