= Lijiang–Shangri-La railway =

Railway line in Yunnan, China

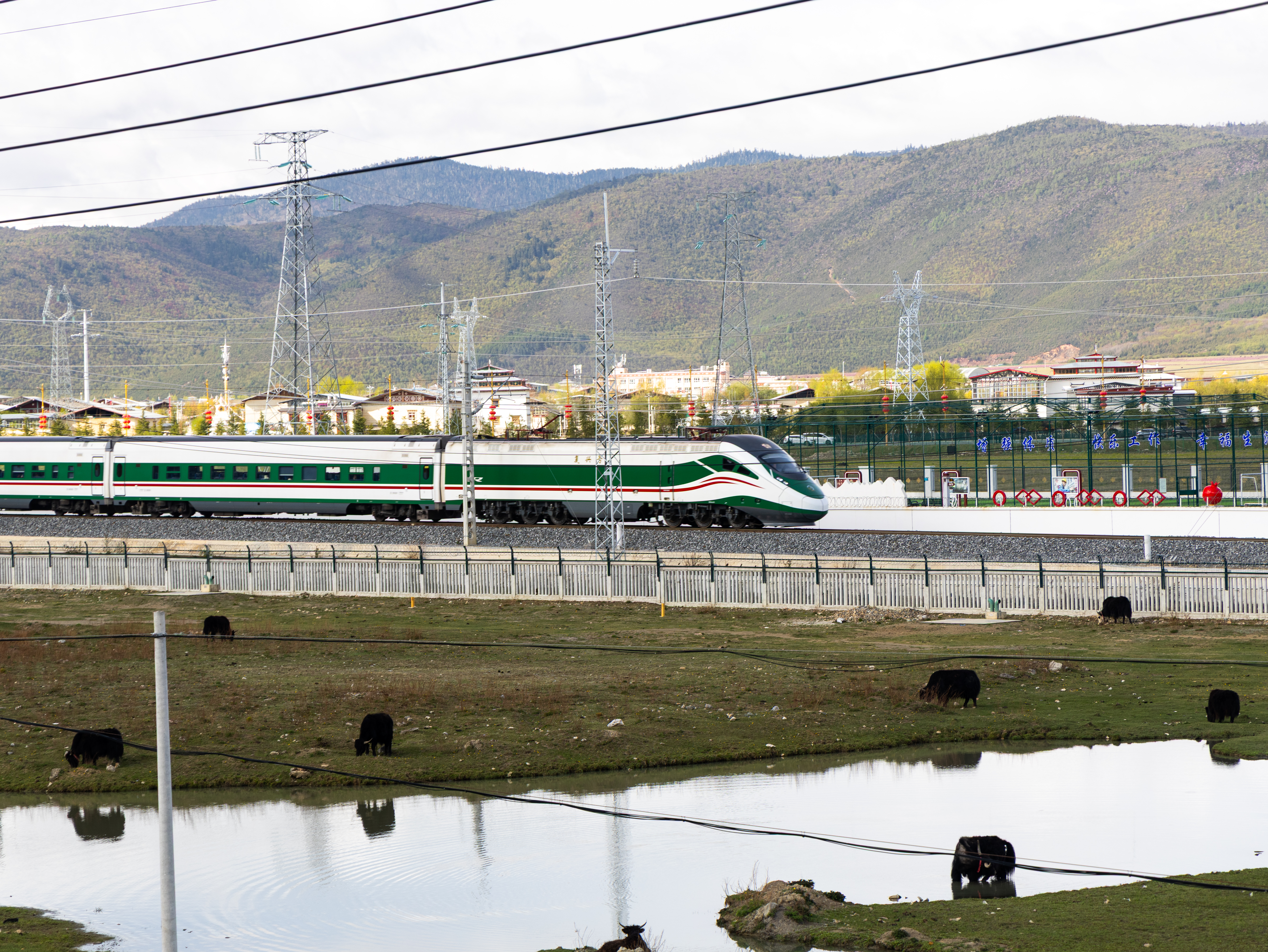
Fuxing train on the Shangri-La section of Lijiang–Shangri-la railway

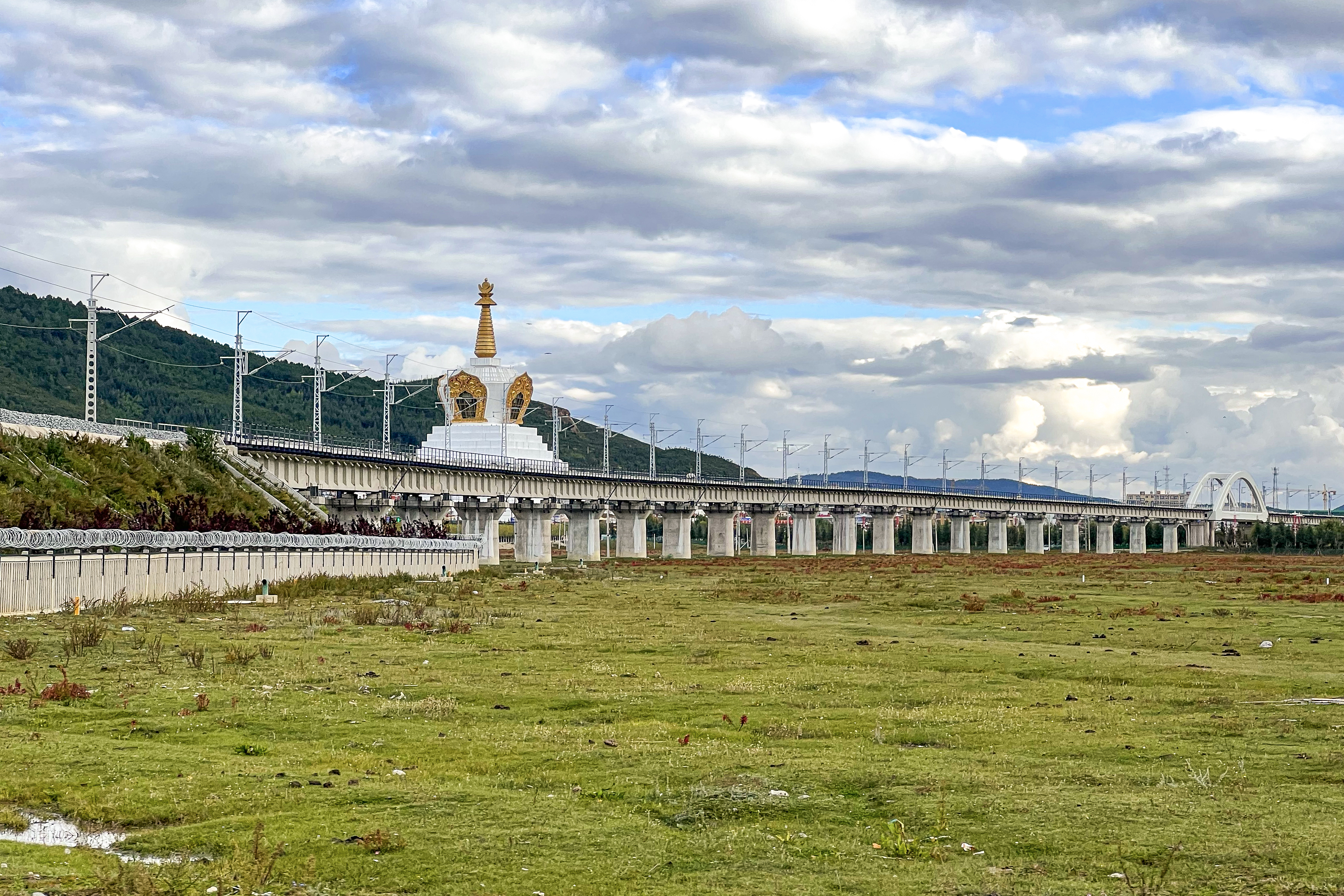
The railway in Jiantang town, Shangri-la city.

The Lijiang–Shangri-la railway (Chinese: 丽江至香格里拉铁路; pinyin: Lìjiāng Zhì Xiānggélǐlā tiělù) or Lixiang railway (Chinese: 丽香铁路; pinyin: Lìxiāng tiělù), is an electrified railway in Yunnan Province of Southwest China. The shorthand name of the line is named after its two terminal cities, Lijiang and Shangri-la. The railway opened on 26 November 2023.

The railway runs 139 km (86 mi) from Lijiang railway station of the Dali–Lijiang railway, north to Shangri-la in northwestern Yunnan. It will have a design speed of 140 kilometres per hour (87 mph).

Despite approval of the project's feasibility plans by the NDRC in May 2009, construction did not begin until July 22, 2014. At the time, construction was expected to take six years. It was subsequently expected to open by the end of 2021. The railway opened on 26 November 2023, with delays caused by flooding and landslips in the complex geological conditions.

== Passenger stations ==
- Lijiang (丽江), connect to Dali–Lijiang railway
- Lashihai (拉市海)
- Xiaozhongdian (小中甸)
- Shangrila (香格里拉)

== See also ==
- List of railways in China
