= Bavet municipality =

Bavet ក្រុងបាវិត Krong Bavet
- City
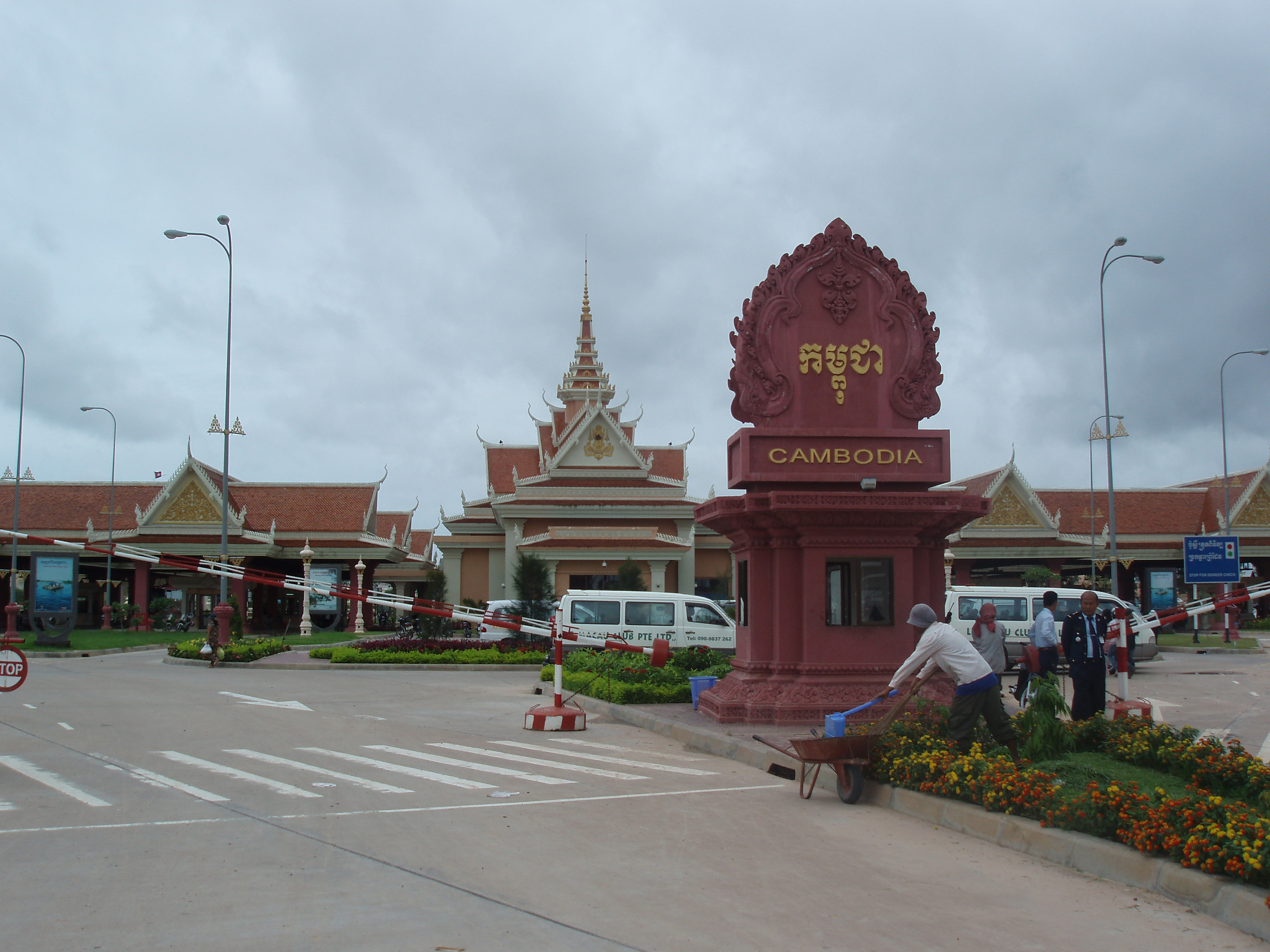

- Location in Cambodia
- Coordinates: 11°04′N 106°08′E
- Country: Cambodia
- Province: Svay Rieng

Population (2019)
  - Total: 43,783
- Time zone: UTC+07:00 (ICT)
- Postal code: 202020

Bavet (Khmer: បាវិត, Bavĭt [ɓaːʋət]) is the largest city in Svay Rieng Province, Cambodia. An international border crossing between Cambodia and Vietnam, its counterpart across the border is Mộc Bài of Tây Ninh Province, Vietnam.

Bavet is one of the "special economic zones" (SEZ) of Cambodia and there were established textile industries and bicycles factories. However, the most evident economic activity of Bavet are the casinos, fraud factories and cockfighting rings, attended by Chinese and Vietnamese. Bavet's border casino zone has been mentioned in reporting on Cambodia-based online scam compounds and related trafficking; see Scam centers in Cambodia

In accordance with decentralization politics experienced by Cambodian government, Bavet commune has become a municipality by sub-decree in December 2008. There are about 10–12 (from small to large) casinos and 6 to 7 developing areas set up by foreign investors. The city is in a growing state. The 2 km-long Neak Loeang bridge funded by Japan has been finished in April 2015. It is the longest bridge in Cambodia.

== Transport ==
The proposed Ho Chi Minh City–Phnom Penh railway is planned to pass through Bavet.

== Gallery ==
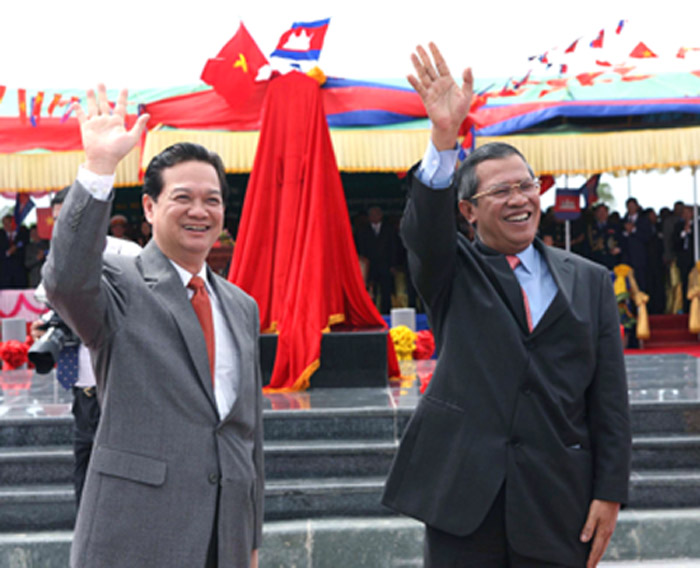
Nguyen Tan Dung, Vietnamese Prime Minister, and Hun Sen, Cambodian Prime Minister, opened ceremony of boundary stone at Moc Bai-Bavet border.

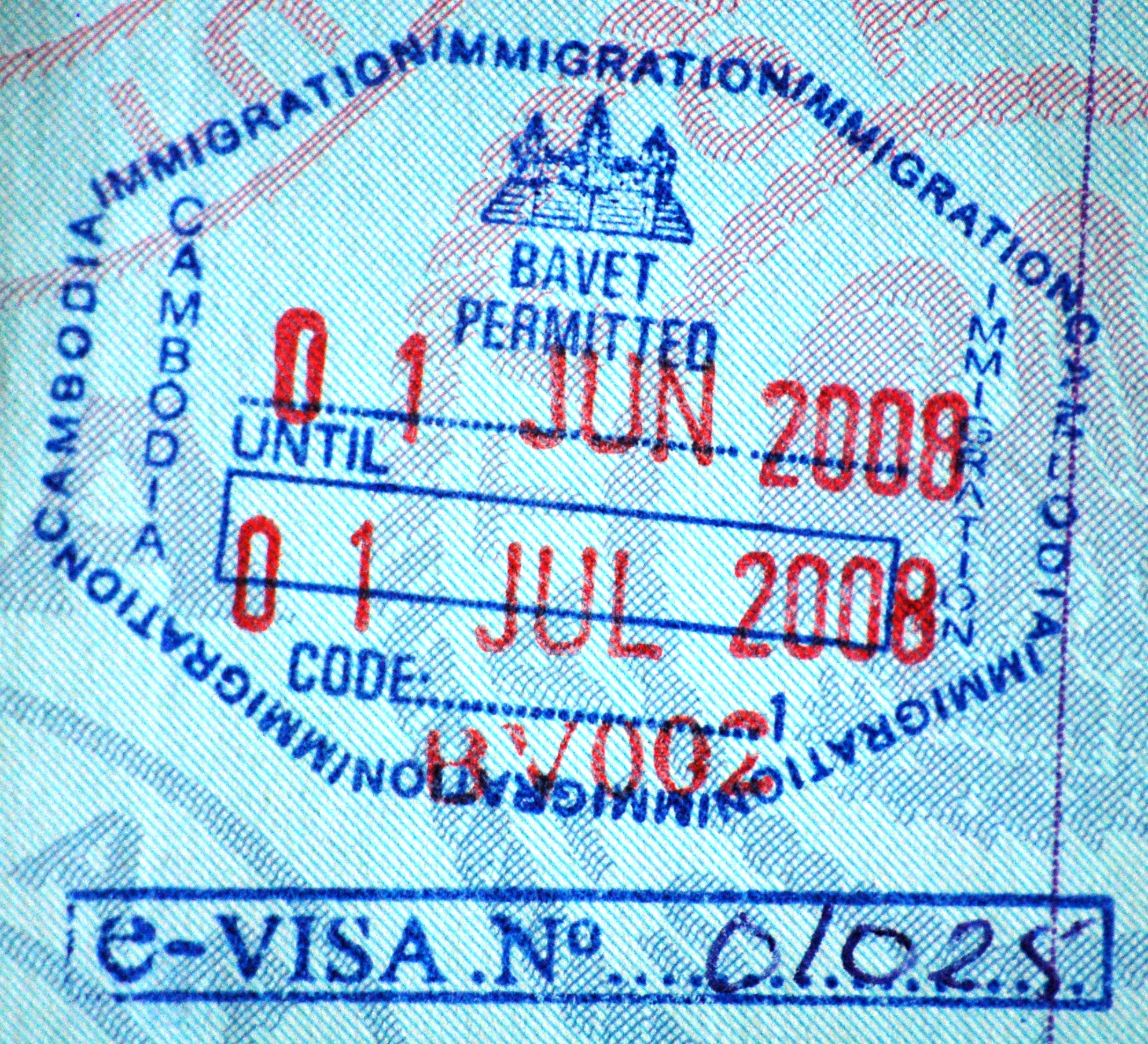
Passport entry stamp issued at Bavet.
