= Transmountain railroad =

Transmountain railroads are railroads that need to cross dauntingly high mountain ranges to cross between countries on one side to the other. The Himalayan Mountains, Andes and the Alps would be cases in point. Because of construction difficulties, some such railways are yet to be built. With globalisation and trade liberalisation, the economic viability of constructing of these railways is improving.

== Myanmar to China ==
In 2009, a railway was proposed to link Lashio, Myanmar and Jiegao, China and which also crosses the Himalaya Mountains.

There would be a break-of-gauge from 1,000 mm (3 ft 3 3/8 in) as used by Myanmar Railways to 1,435 mm (4 ft 8 1/2 in) as used in China.

== Pakistan to China ==
The proposed trans-Himalayan railway from Pakistan to China via the Khunjerab Pass could count as a transcontinental railroad due to the size of the mountains in the way.

There would be a break-of-gauge from 1,676 mm (5 ft 6 in) as used by the Pakistan Railways to 1,435 mm (4 ft 8 1/2 in). This line would be approximately 1,100 kilometres (680 mi) long.

== See also ==
- Mountain railway
- List of railroad crossings of the North American continental divide
- Principal passes of the Alps
- Qinghai–Tibet Railway
- Trans-Andean railways
- Trans-Asian Railway
- Transcontinental railroad
