= Saigon–Lộc Ninh railway =

Railway in Vietnam

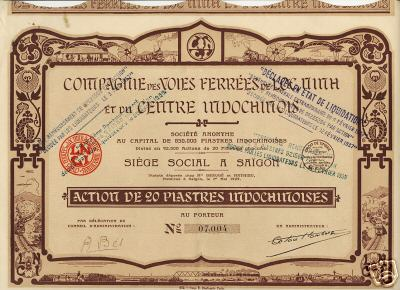
Bonds to build the Saigon–Lộc Ninh railway were issued by the French state

The Saigon–Lộc Ninh railway is an obsolete railway, connecting Ho Chi Minh City and Lộc Ninh. Built from the French colonial period, connecting with the North–South railway at Dĩ An station, passing Thủ Dầu Một in Bình Dương Province and then on An Lộc and Lộc Ninh. This route was abandoned during the Vietnam War. At present, there is a plan to restore and rebuild it to connect 128.5 km of Trans-Asian Railway to Cambodia.
