= Guangtong, Yunnan =

Guangtong 广通镇
- Town
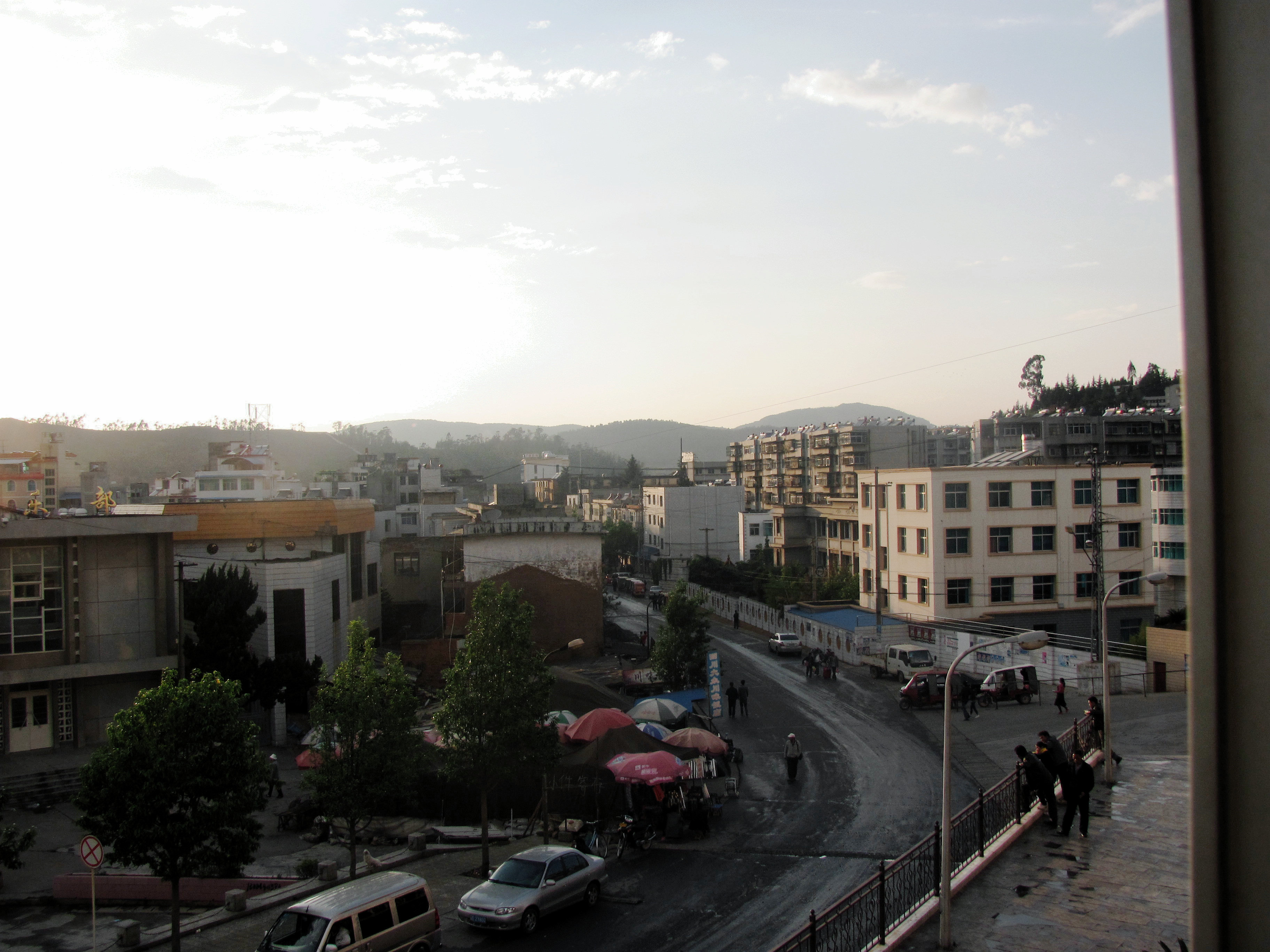

- Location within China Location within Yunnan
- Coordinates: 25.16°N 101.74°E

Area
  - Total: 352.2 km^{2} (136.0 sq mi)
- Elevation: 1,758 m (5,768 ft)

Population (2023)
  - Total: 39,794

Guangtong is a town of Lufeng city, Yunnan province, China. It is an important railway junction on the Chengdu–Kunming railway, as it is where the Guangtong–Dali railway splits off.

During the Yuan dynasty it was known as Dunren and the seat of Guangtong county.

The population was 39,794 by the end of 2023, consisting largely of ethnic minorities, including 12,405 Yi people. The Yi are mostly concentrated in the villages Tianxin, Jiziwan, Pingdi, Dawafang, Xinmin, Yuduo, Xinmin, and Tashiju. There are also 688 Hui people living in the town.

The economy relies on copper mining, forestry and wild mushroom trading.
