= Gaoligongshan Tunnel =

Railway tunnel in Yunnan, China

Gaoligongshan Tunnel 高黎贡山隧道
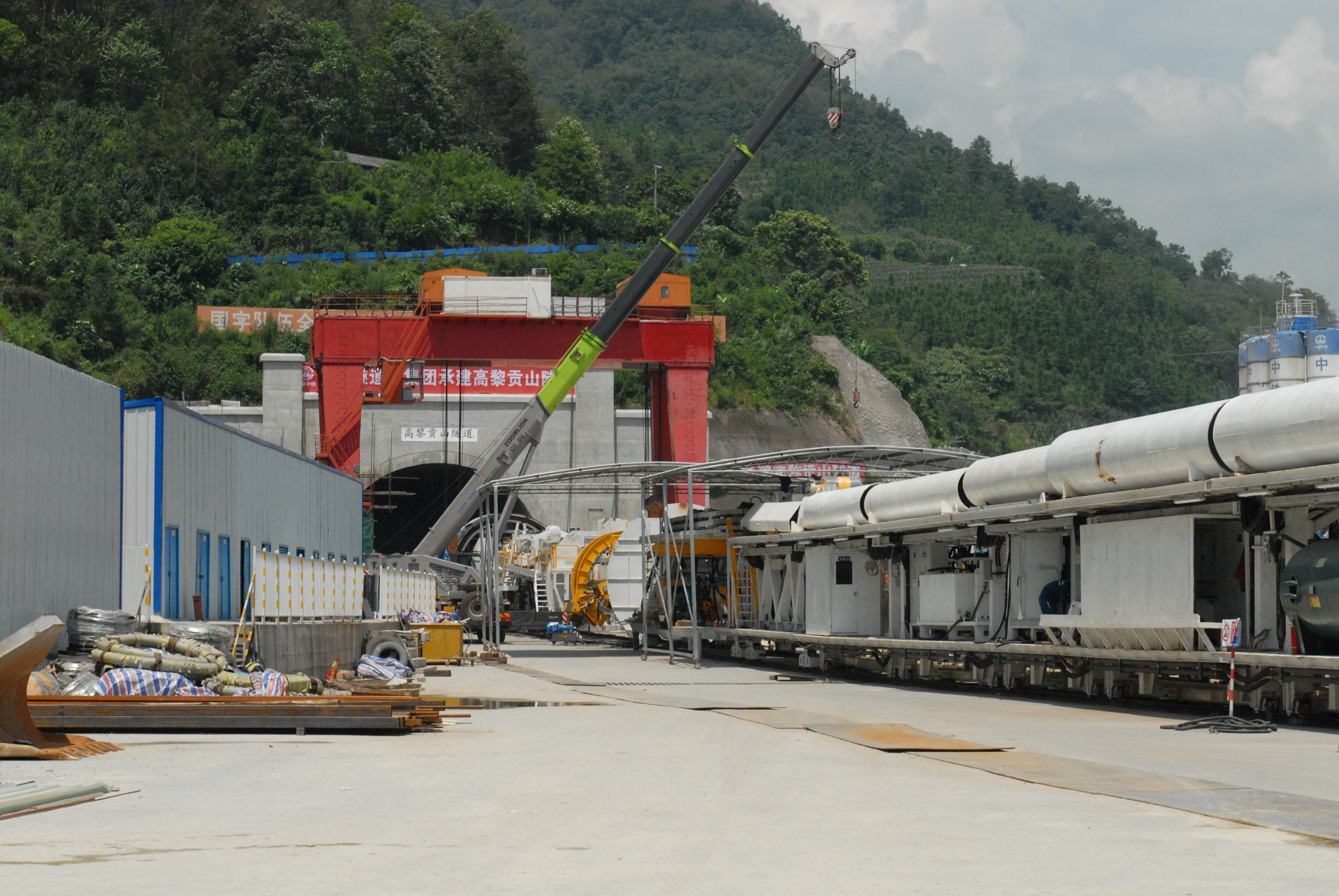
- Construction site at the end of tunnel
- Interactive map of Gaoligongshan Tunnel 高黎贡山隧道

Overview
- Line: Dali–Ruili railway
- Location: Longling County, Yunnan
- Coordinates: 24°38′58″N 98°49′39″E
- Status: Under construction
- System: China Railway
- Crosses: Gaoligong Mountains
- Start: West bank of Nu River in Longling County
- End: Nanwazidi (南凹子地) in Longling County

Operation
- Work began: 1 December 2015; 10 years ago
- Owner: China Railway

Technical
- Design engineer: China Railway Tunnel Group
- Length: 34.5 km (Note: The length has been reported as 34.586468 km and 34.538 km.)
- No. of tracks: Single-track railway
- Track gauge: 1,435 mm (4 ft 8 1/2 in) standard gauge
- Operating speed: 140 km/h
- Max elevation: 2,340 m
- Min elevation: 640 m
- Water Depth: 1,155 m
- Grade: 23.5‰ (biggest)

Gaoligongshan Tunnel or Gaoligong Mountain Rail Tunnel (Chinese: 高黎贡山隧道) is a 34.5 km (21.4 mi) tunnel, currently under construction, between Nujiang Station and Longling Station on the Dali–Ruili railway in Yunnan, China. It passes through the entirety of Longling County and then into Mangshi.

Upon completion, it will be the longest mountain railway tunnel in Asia. The tunnel is the key project of Dali–Ruili railway between Dali and Ruili.

Construction started on 1 December 2015. The tunnel boring machine "Colorful Cloud No.1"(Chinese: 彩云一号) began work on 28 August 2017. The expected completion date for 1st phase is 31 May 2022, for a cost of CN¥ 3.628 billion and 30 November 2025 for the 2nd phase.
