= Dali railway station (Yunnan) =

Railway station in Dali, Yunnan, China

Dali 大理
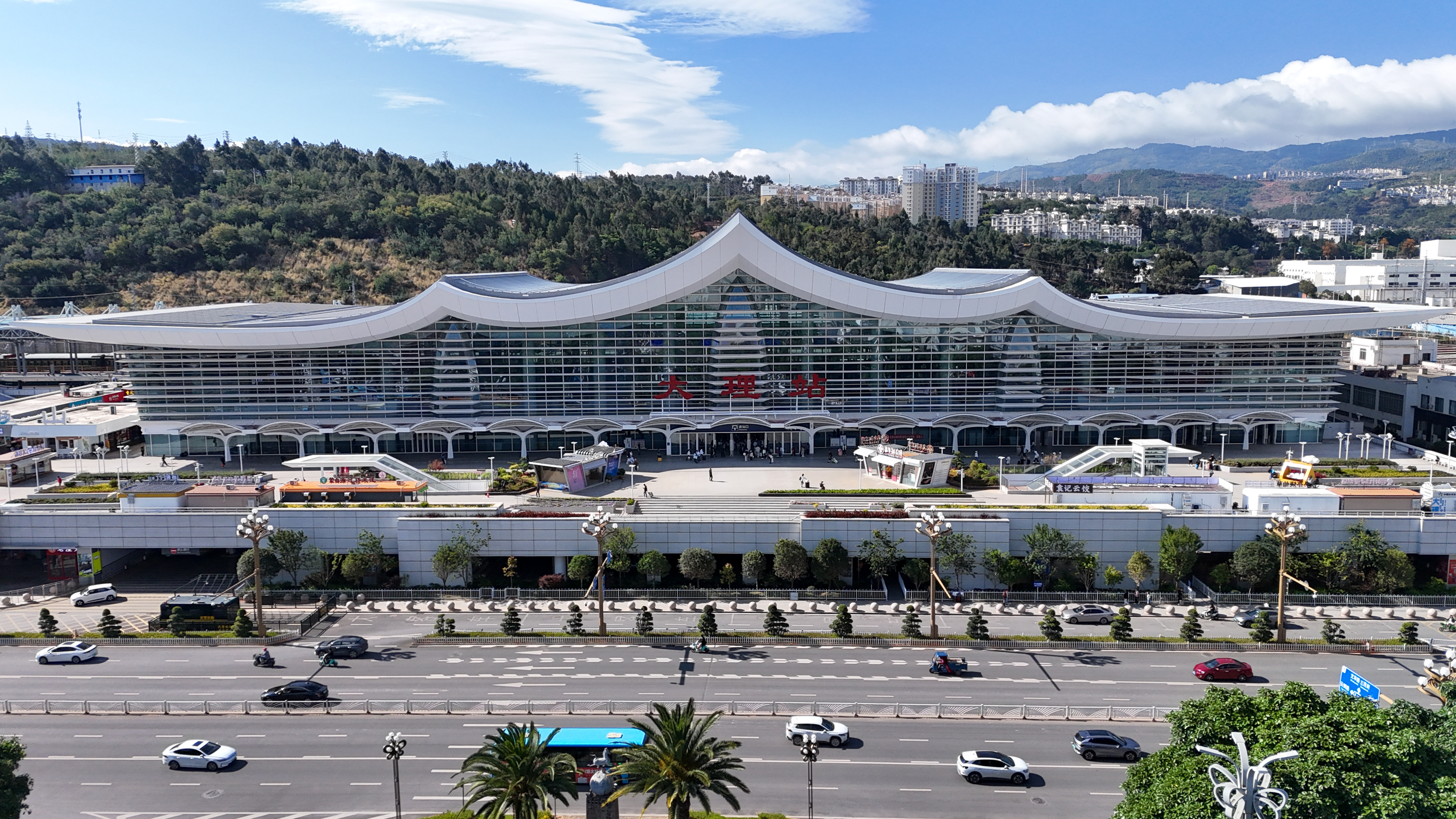
- Dali railway station in 2026

General information
- Location: Dali, Dali Bai Autonomous Prefecture, Yunnan; China
- Coordinates: 25.5923°N 100.2495°E
- Lines: Guangtong–Chuxiong–Dali railway Dali–Lincang railway Dali–Ruili railway

History
- Opened: 1999
- Rebuilt: December 30, 2024
Location

Dali railway station (Chinese: 大理站; pinyin: Dàlǐ zhàn) is a railway station located in Dali, Dali Bai Autonomous Prefecture, Yunnan, China. It opened in 1999.

== History ==
The first EMU service to Dali railway station began on 1 July 2018. Dali–Ruili railway opened on 22 July 2022.

Since the opening of the Guangtong–Dali railway and the Dali–Lincang railway, passenger numbers of the station greatly increased, and the original station facilities became insufficient. Starting from March 2023, the station is being rebuilt on the original site. The new station building has a planned construction area of about 21,000 square meters, being able to accommodate 2,800 passengers. The construction period is expected to be 2 years. During the reconstruction period, a temporary station building located 270 meters east of the original station building is in use. The temporary station building is a steel frame structure of more than 5,200 square meters, including a waiting hall of 3,100 square meters, which can accommodate 1,600 passengers.
