= Baoshan railway station (Yunnan) =

Railway station in Yunnan

Baoshan 保山
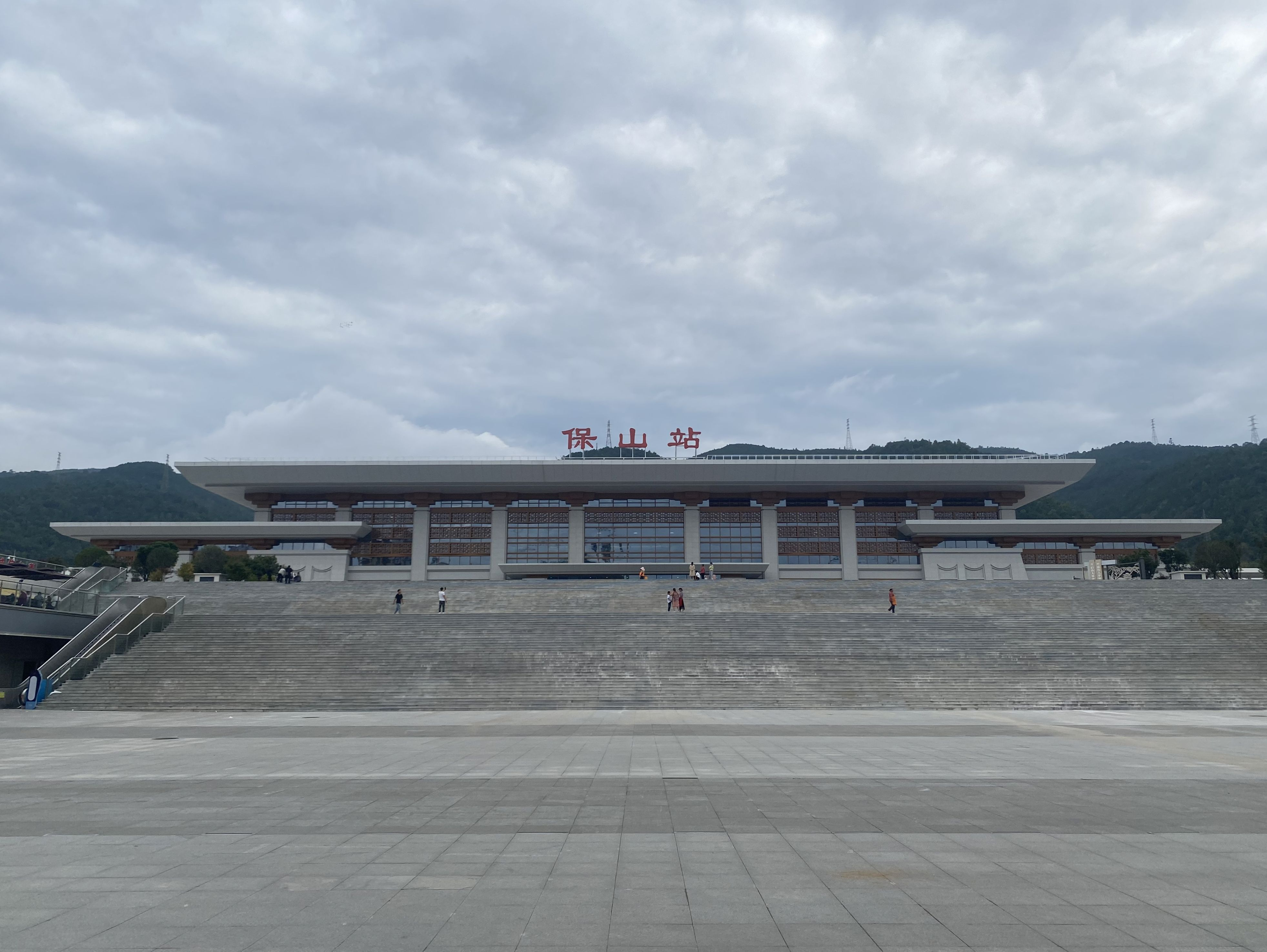

General information
- Location: Longyang District, Baoshan, Yunnan; China
- Coordinates: 25°9′24.51″N 99°10′37.39″E
- Line: Dali–Ruili railway

History
- Opened: 22 July 2022
Location

Baoshan railway station (Chinese: 保山站; pinyin: Bǎoshān zhàn) is a railway station in Longyang District, Baoshan, Yunnan, China. It is an intermediate stop on the Dali–Ruili railway. The station opened on 22 July 2022.

== See also ==
- Baoshan North railway station, a freight station in Baoshan.
