= Guangtong–Dali railway =

Railway line in Yunnan, China

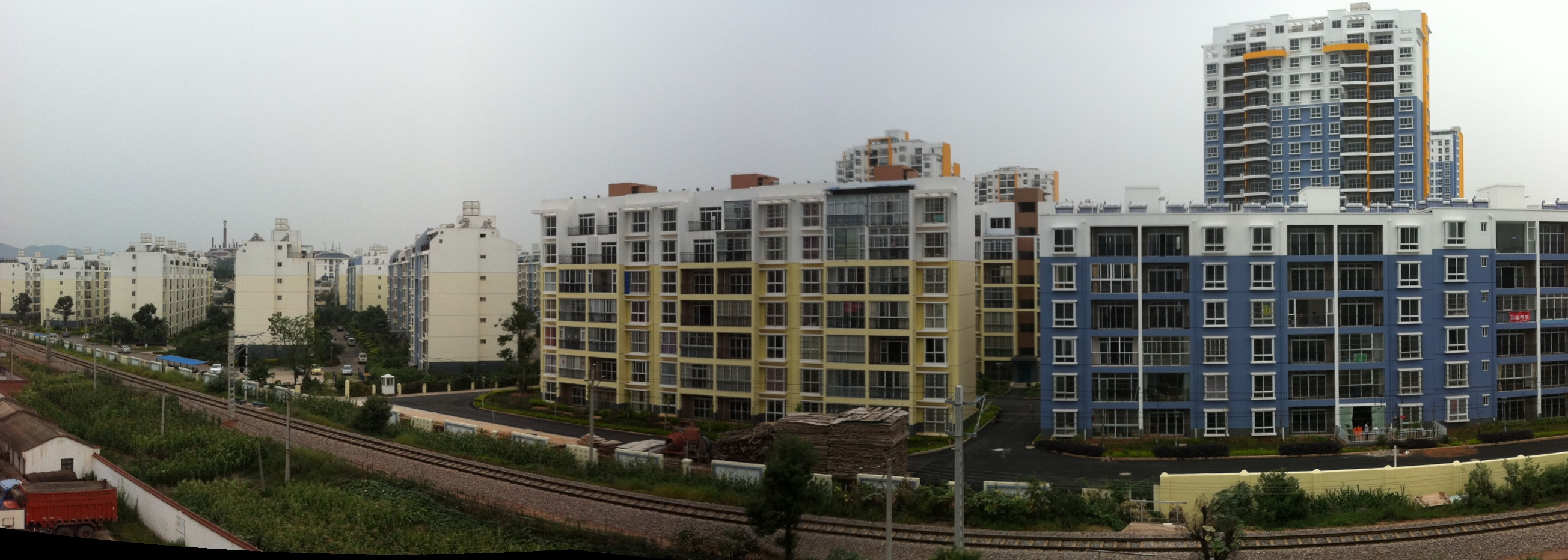
- The Guangtong–Dali railway in the city of Chuxiong

Overview
- Native name: 廣大鐵路
- Status: open
- Locale: Yunnan Province, China
- Termini: Guangtong; Dali
- Stations: 21

Service
- Type: Heavy rail
- System: China Railway
- Operator(s): CR Kunming Group & Dianxi Railway Co., Ltd

History
- Opened: May 1999

Technical
- Line length: 206 km (128 mi)
- Track gauge: 1,435 mm (4 ft 8 1/2 in) standard gauge
- Minimum radius: 350 m (1,150 ft); 5,500 m (18,000 ft) (difficult)
- Electrification: No
- Operating speed: 60 km/h (37 mph)
- Signalling: Semi-automatic block
- Maximum incline: 1.2%

The Guangtong–Dali or Guangda railway (simplified Chinese: 广大铁路; traditional Chinese: 廣大鐵路; pinyin: guǎngdà tiělù), is a single-track electrified railroad in Yunnan Province of Southwest China. The line branches off from the Guangtong station, near Kunming on the Chengdu–Kunming railway and runs west to Dali City. The line is 213 km (132 mi) in length and was built from May 1992 to June 1998. Major cities and towns along the route include Chuxiong City, Nanhua, Xiangyun County, Midu County and Dali.

Construction of a new, 175-km dual-track electrified line, the Guangtong–Chuxiong–Dali railway, paralleling the line began in September 2010. Difficulties in construction included 110,000 cubic meters of water inundation of the tunnels. The new electrified line opened for traffic in July 2018, upping speeds from 60 to 200 km/h and doubling the track. After the opening of the Guangtong–Chuxiong–Dali railway, the Guangtong–Dali railway discontinued its passenger services.

== Rail connections ==
- Guangtong: Chengdu–Kunming railway to Kunming
- Dali: Dali–Lijiang railway, Dali–Ruili railway

== See also ==
- List of railways in China
