= Dali–Lijiang railway =

Railway line in Yunnan, China

The Dali–Lijiang railway or Dali railway (simplified Chinese: 大丽铁路; traditional Chinese: 大麗鐵路; pinyin: dàlì tiělù), is a single-track electrified railroad in Yunnan Province of Southwest China. The line runs 165 km (103 mi) from Dali to Lijiang and was built from 2004 to 2009. Bridges and tunnels account 98 km (61 mi) of the total length of the line. The trip by train between the two cities takes 1.5 hours compared to four hours by bus, with maximum rated speed at 140 km/h.

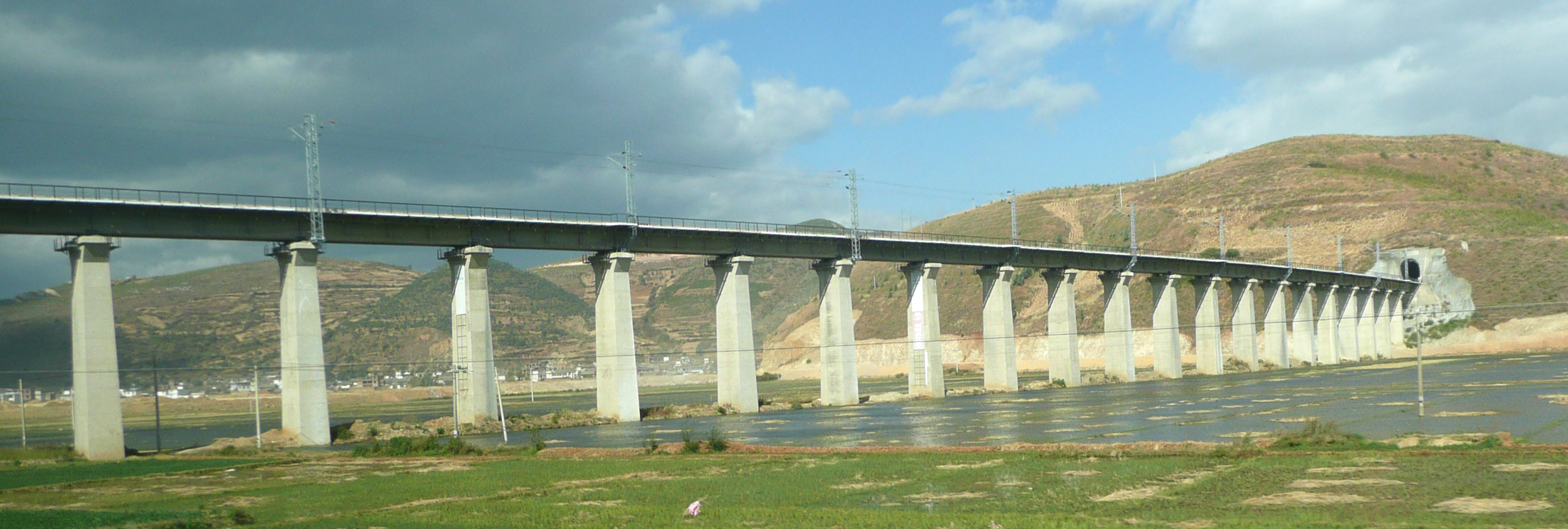
Dali-Lijiang railway

On October 30, 2011, the Dali–Lijiang railway was extended northward by 16-km after the Renhe-Lijiang (Renli) rail extension was completed. The Renli section begins from Renhe station, near Renhe village in Qihe Township of Old Town Lijiang, and runs north to the newly built Lijiang railway station. The new Lijiang station is the second largest passenger railway station in Yunnan and will serve as the southern terminus of the Lijiang–Shangri-La railway.

== Rail connections ==
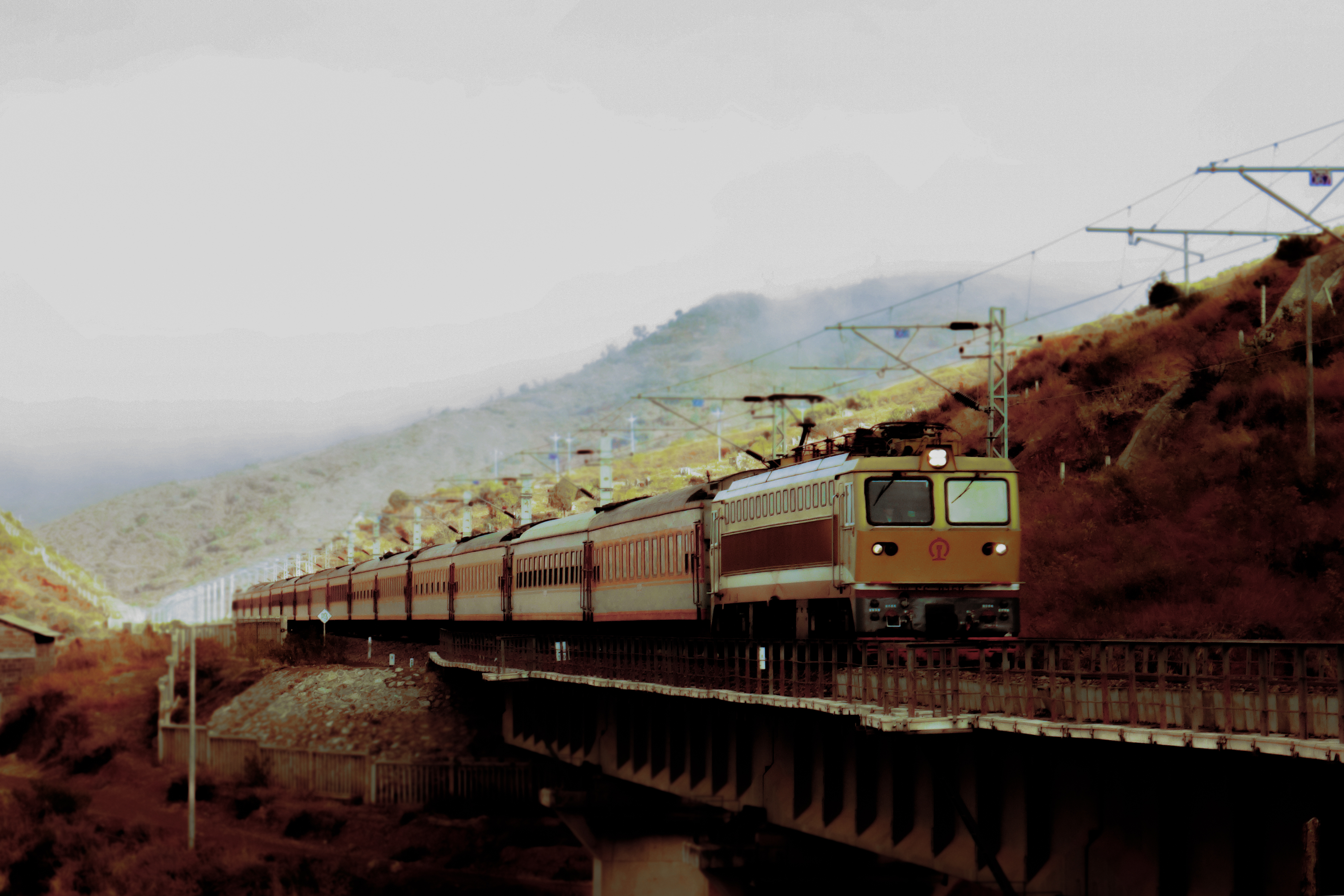
The Dali railway.

- Dali: Guangtong–Dali railway, Dali–Lincang railway, Dali–Ruili railway
- Lijiang: Lijiang–Shangri-La railway

== See also ==
- List of railways in China
