= Trans-Asian Railway =

Proposed railway across Europe and Asia

The Trans-Asian Railway (TAR) is a project to create an integrated freight railway network across Europe and Asia. The project is of the United Nations Economic and Social Commission for Asia and the Pacific (UNESCAP).

The project was initiated in the 1950s, with the objective of providing a continuous 8,750 miles (14,080 km) rail link between Singapore and Istanbul, Turkey, with possible further connections to Europe and Africa. At the time shipping and air travel were not as well developed, and the project promised to significantly reduce shipping times and costs between Europe and Asia. Progress in developing the TAR was hindered by political and economic obstacles throughout the 1960s, 1970s and early 1980s. By the 1990s, the end of the Cold War and normalisation of relations between some countries improved the prospects for creating a rail network across the Asian continent.

The TAR was seen as a way to accommodate the huge increases in international trade between Eurasian nations and facilitate the increased movements of goods between countries. It was also seen as a way to improve the economies and accessibility of landlocked countries like Laos, Afghanistan, Mongolia, and the Central Asian republics.

Much of the railway network already exists as part of the Eurasian Land Bridge, although significant gaps remain. A big challenge is the differences in rail gauge across Eurasia. Four major rail gauges (which measures the distance between rails) are in use across the continent: most of Europe, as well as Turkey, Iran, China, and the Koreas use the 1,435 mm (4 ft 8 1/2 in) gauge, known as Standard gauge; Russia and the former Soviet republics use a 1,520 mm (4 ft 11 27/32 in) gauge; Finland uses a 1,524 mm (5 ft) gauge, both known as Russian gauge; the railways in India, Pakistan, Bangladesh and Sri Lanka use the 1,676 mm (5 ft 6 in) gauge, known as Indian gauge; and most of Southeast Asia has 1,000 mm (3 ft 3 3/8 in) metre gauge. For the most part the TAR would not change national gauges; mechanized transfer facilities would be built to transload shipping containers from train to train at the breaks of gauge.

== Routes ==
By 2001, four corridors had been studied:

- The Northern Corridor will link Europe and Northeast Asia via Germany, Poland, Belarus, Russia, Kazakhstan, Mongolia, China, North Korea and South Korea, with breaks of gauge at the Polish-Belarusian border (1,435 mm or 4 ft 8 1/2 in to 1,520 mm or 4 ft 11 27/32 in), the Kazakhstan-Chinese border and the Mongolian-Chinese border (both 1,520 mm to 1,435 mm). The 5,750 miles (9,250 km) Trans-Siberian Railway covers much of this route and currently carries large amounts of freight from East Asia to Moscow and on to the rest of Europe. Due to political problems with North Korea, freight from South Korea must currently be shipped by sea to the port of Vladivostok to access the route.

- The Southern Corridor, also called ITI-DKD-Y (Istanbul-Tehran-Islamabad-Delhi-Kolkata-Dhaka-Yangon), will go from Europe to Southeast Asia, connecting Turkey, Iran, Pakistan, India, Bangladesh, Myanmar, and Thailand, with links to China's Yunnan Province and, via the Southeast Asian corridor, to Malaysia and Singapore. Gaps exist between Imphal-Moreh in India and to Tamu- Kalay (also called Kale and Kalemyo) in Myanmar, between Chittagong-Cox's Bazar in Bangladesh to Myanmar and between Myanmar and Thailand. The section in eastern Iran between Bam and Zahedan has been completed. Breaks of gauge occur, or will occur, at the Iran-Pakistan border (1,435 mm or 4 ft 8 1/2 in to 1,676 mm or 5 ft 6 in), the India-Myanmar border (1,676 mm to 1,000 mm or 3 ft 3 3/8 in), and to China (1,000 mm to 1,435 mm).

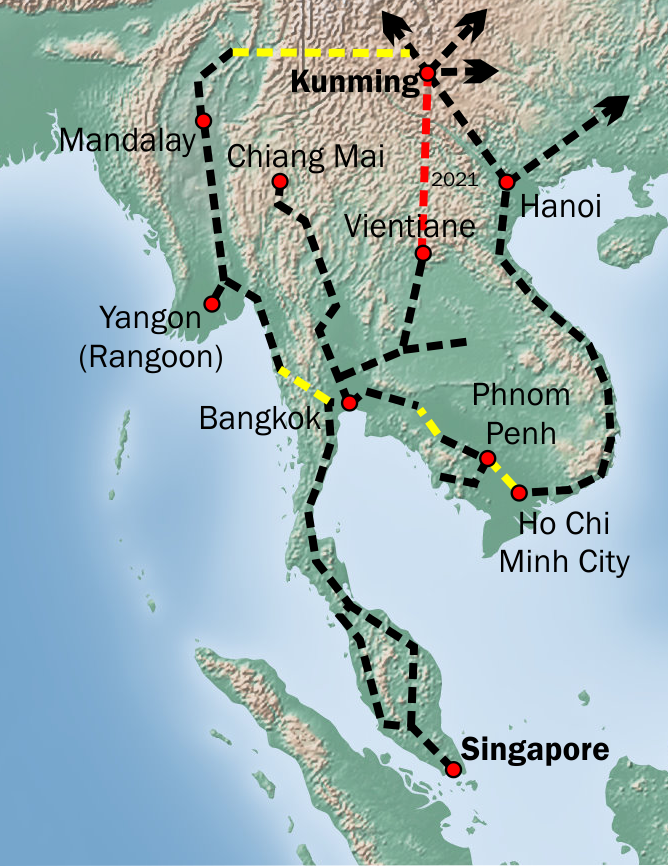
Connections in Southeast Asia, built (black), projected (yellow) and yet to open (red).

- A Southeast Asian network; this primarily consists of the Kunming–Singapore Railway.
- The North-South Corridor will link Northern Europe to the Persian Gulf. The main route starts in Helsinki, Finland, and continues through Russia to the Caspian Sea, where it splits into three routes: a western route through Azerbaijan, Armenia, and western Iran; a central route across the Caspian Sea to Iran via rail ferry; and an eastern route through Kazakhstan, Uzbekistan and Turkmenistan to eastern Iran. The routes converge in the Iran's capital of Tehran and continue to the Iranian port of Bandar Abbas.

== Agreement ==
The Trans-Asian Railway Network Agreement is an agreement signed on 10 November 2006, by seventeen Asian nations as part of a United Nations Economic and Social Commission for Asia and the Pacific (UNESCAP) effort to build a transcontinental railway network between Europe and Pacific ports in China. The plan has sometimes been called the "Iron Silk Road" in reference to the historical Silk Road trade routes. UNESCAP's Transport & Tourism Division began work on the initiative in 1992 when it launched the Asian Land Transport Infrastructure Development project.

The agreement formally came into force on 11 June 2009.

=== Network ===
The Trans-Asian Railway system will consist of four main railway routes. The existing Trans-Siberian Railway, which connects Moscow to Vladivostok, will be used for a portion of the network in Russia. Another corridor to be included will connect China to Korea, Mongolia, Russia and Kazakhstan. In 2003, the president of Kazakhstan proposed building a standard gauge link from Dostyk (on the Chinese border) to Gorgan in Iran; it has not yet been built.

==== Standards ====
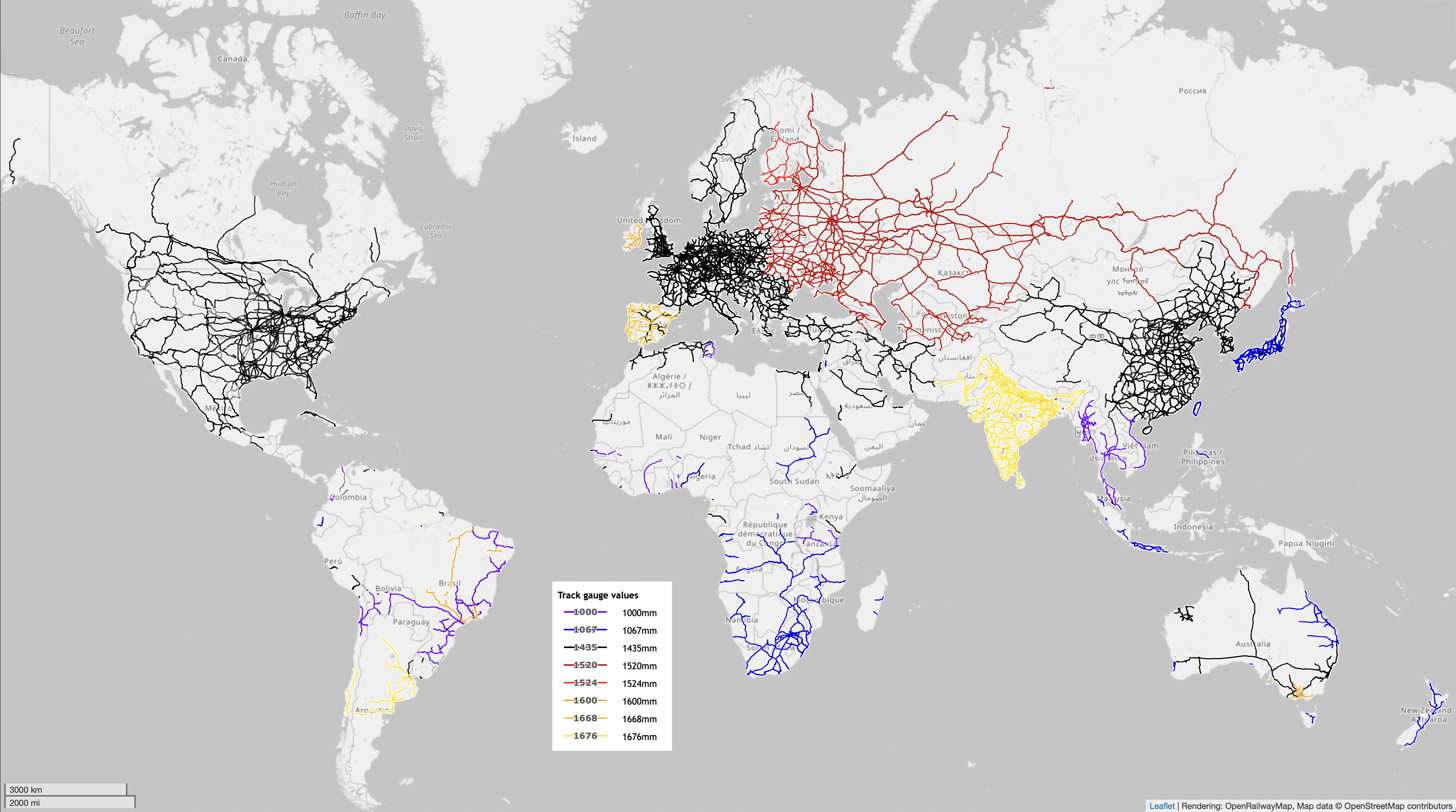
Map of the world's railways showing the different gauges in use. 3 ft gauge (914 mm) Meter gauge (1,000 mm) Cape gauge (1,067 mm) Standard gauge (1,435 mm) Russian gauge (1,520 mm) Five foot gauge (1,524 mm) Irish gauge (1,600 mm) Iberian gauge (1,668 mm) Indian gauge (1,676 mm)

Complicating the plan is the differences in rail gauges currently in use across the continent. While China, Iran, Laos and Turkey use 1,435 mm (4 ft 8 1/2 in) standard gauge tracks, tracks of Russia and Central Asia are gauged at 1,520 mm (4 ft 11 27/32 in). In South Asia, India's and Pakistan's tracks are gauged at 1,676 mm (5 ft 6 in). In South East Asia, the tracks of Myanmar, Thailand, Vietnam and Malaysia are 1,000 mm (3 ft 3 3/8 in) metre gauge with some dual gauge tracks near the China–Vietnam border and within Bangladesh, and tracks in Indonesia and Japan are mostly 1,067 mm (3 ft 6 in) gauge. This leads to time-consuming interchanges or transloading to handle the break of gauge at main connecting points in the network.

Other standards to consider include allowing for interoperability:

- Railway electrification – 25 kV AC the world standard for new long distance and heavy duty construction since the 1950s.
- Couplings – buffers and chains, Alliance, or SA3. Some dual couplings and adapters or barrier vehicles are possible.
- Brakes – air, with or without electronically controlled pneumatic brakes (ECP).
- Loading gauge and structure gauge – able to take tallest possible shipping container. Possible double stacking.
- Signalling systems – where signals are electronic, not physically visible, and must be 'read' by equipment in the locomotives, or where the train must interact in different ways with the infrastructure
- Electromagnetic interference – where radio waves (noise) from electric motors can interact with different signalling systems
- Rules and regulations.
- Language, including Seaspeak.
- Break of gauge devices, such as dual gauge, Train on Train piggybacking or variable gauge axles.

=== Participating nations ===
Transportation and railway ministers from forty one nations participated in the week-long conference held in Busan, South Korea, where the agreement was formulated. The proposed 80,900-km railway network will originate from the Pacific seaboard of Asia and end on the doorsteps of Europe. The agreement's cosigners included the following participating countries:

- Afghanistan
- Armenia
- Azerbaijan
- Bangladesh
- Belarus
- Bhutan
- Brunei
- Cambodia
- China
- India
- Indonesia
- Iran
- Kazakhstan
- Laos
- Mongolia
- Nepal
- Pakistan
- South Korea
- Russia
- Sri Lanka
- Tajikistan
- Thailand
- Turkey
- Turkmenistan
- Uzbekistan

The 28 countries that did not sign the agreement at the conference had until 31 December 2007, to join and ratify the agreement.

On 5 May 2007, officials in Bangladesh announced that the nation will sign on to the agreement at an upcoming meeting in New York City. The plan for the network includes three lines between India and Myanmar that traverse Bangladesh. India made a similar announcement on 17 May 2007. As part of the agreement, India will build and rehabilitate rail links with neighboring Myanmar in projects that are estimated to cost more than ₹ 29.41 billion (US$730 million). Bangladesh finally signed the agreement on 10 November 2007.

India's Look-East connectivity policy has resulted in the launch of several connectivity projects with China and ASEAN nations.

== Progress ==
The Northern Corridor was in operation as early as the 1960s, although at first only for Soviet Union-China trade. The Southern corridor has progressively opened up after 2000. Successes so far include:

=== Northern Line ===
- Rail link from China to Kazakhstan (Turkestan–Siberia Railway and Lanxin railway, with break-of-gauge) has been completed since 1990, allowing cargo services such as Yiwu–London and Chongqing–Xinjiang–Europe lines
- Second link from China to Kazakhstan (line Zhetigen–Khorgos, completed in December 2011).
- Direct freight service between Germany and China through Russia and Mongolia or Kazakhstan, operating from the first decade of the 2000s (transloading of container at break-of-gauge).

=== Southern Line ===
- The Eurasia Marmaray Tunnel connecting European Turkey and Asian Turkey, opened in 2013. At that time the tunnel was isolated from rail network but finally got connected with the completion of Marmaray project in 2019. The first international freight train transporting magnesite and connecting Çukurhisar (in Tepebaşı, Eskişehir) to Austria ran through the tunnel last week of October 2019. Before this, there was a freight-train ferry there.
- A train ferry across Lake Van, from 1970s allowing rail services between Turkey and Iran.
- Link from Iran to Central Asia (Trans-Caspian railway; branch Tejen–Sarakhs–Mashhad, completed in 1996).
- Link from Iran to Herat in Afghanistan completed 2013.
- Iran-Pakistan: A Bam–Zahedan link, with a break-of-gauge at Zahedan (Pakistan railway uses broad gauge 1,676 mm (5 ft 6 in) and Iran railway uses standard gauge 1,435 mm (4 ft 8 1/2 in)). In August 2009, a goods train carrying containers traveled from Islamabad, Pakistan to Istanbul, Turkey; by April 2011, trains were running regularly.
- In 2016, Bangladesh decided to connect to the network with a rail line from Dohazari to Gundum near the Myanmar border.

=== Southeast Asia ===
- The Boten–Vientiane railway opened in December 2021, completing the Central section of the line and forming a near through-train connection from Kunming to Singapore (with a break-of-gauge in Vientiane).

=== North–South Transport Corridor ===
- Agreement in 2023 between Iran and Russia on completing the north–south corridor. The missing link is Astara–Rasht, a distance of 162 km.

== See also ==
- TransAfricaRail
- African Union of Railways
- Asian Highway Network
- Bandhan Express
- Cosmopolitan Railway
- Greater East Asia Railroad
- Intercontinental and transoceanic fixed links
- International Union of Railways
- Japan–Korea Undersea Tunnel
- Gyeongui Line
- Košice–Vienna broad-gauge line
- Maitree Express
- Northern East West Freight Corridor
- One Belt, One Road
- Transcontinental railroad
- Transmountain railroad
- International North-South Transport Corridor
- Middle Corridor
