= Vientiane railway station =

Laotian railway station opened in 2021

Vientiane Railway Station ສະຖານີນະຄອນຫຼວງວຽງຈັນ

General information
- Location: Don Noun, Xaythany district Vientiane Prefecture; Laos
- Coordinates: 18°2′46″N 102°41′26″E
- Owner: Laos–China Railway Company Limited (LCR)
- Operator: CR Kunming
- Manager: Lao National Railway State Enterprise (LNR)
- Line: Boten–Vientiane railway
- Platforms: 3
- Tracks: 5
- Connections: Bus 12 (Central Bus Station, Khamsavath Station)

Construction
- Structure type: At-grade
- Platform levels: 2
- Parking: Available
- Cycle facilities: No
- Accessible: Yes
- Architect: China Railway Construction
- Architectural style: Laotian & Chinese

Other information
- Status: Staffed, Open

History
- Opened: 3 December 2021
- Electrified: 25 kV 50 Hz AC overhead line

Services
Preceding station	China Railway	Following station
Vientiane North towards Boten	Boten–Vientiane railway	Vientiane South Terminus
Location

Vientiane railway station (Lao: ສະຖານີນະຄອນຫຼວງວຽງຈັນ; Chinese: 万象站) is a railway station in Vientiane, Laos. It is the second station on the Boten–Vientiane railway. The largest and most important station on the line, the station was opened along with the rest of the line on 3 December 2021.

== Design ==
Located 15 km northeast of central Vientiane, the station building sits on 14,543 square metres (156,540 sq ft) of land and has three platforms and five tracks as well as a station hall that can accommodate 2,500 passengers.

The station's theme is the City of Sandalwood, reflecting the original meaning of "Vientiane". The building is based on traditional Chinese architecture combined with Laotian environmental characteristics. The facade features eight tree-branch-shaped eaves, meant to evoke a tropical rainforest.

== Services ==
As of April 2023, the station has four services per day: two via Luang Prabang to Boten at the Chinese border, one to Luang Prabang only and one to Kunming South.

== Future expansion ==
All tracks at the station are standard gauge, so the station does not serve the existing narrow-gauge railway from Thailand to Laos, which terminates at Khamsavath railway station. The standard gauge Bangkok–Nong Khai high-speed railway, scheduled for completion in 2028, may eventually extend to Vientiane station, completing the Kunming–Singapore railway.

In 2022, the Vientiane Times announced that Laos intends to build a new standard-gauge railway from Vientiane to the port of Vung Ang in central Vietnam.

== Connections ==
The Vientiane city bus 12 connects the station to the Central Bus Station, Patuxai Monument and the Khamsavath railway station. It costs 20,000 kip for adults and half the price for children, and is about an hours ride into the city.

Tuk-Tuks and ride hailing services are also available at the station.

== Gallery ==
Vientiane railway station waiting area

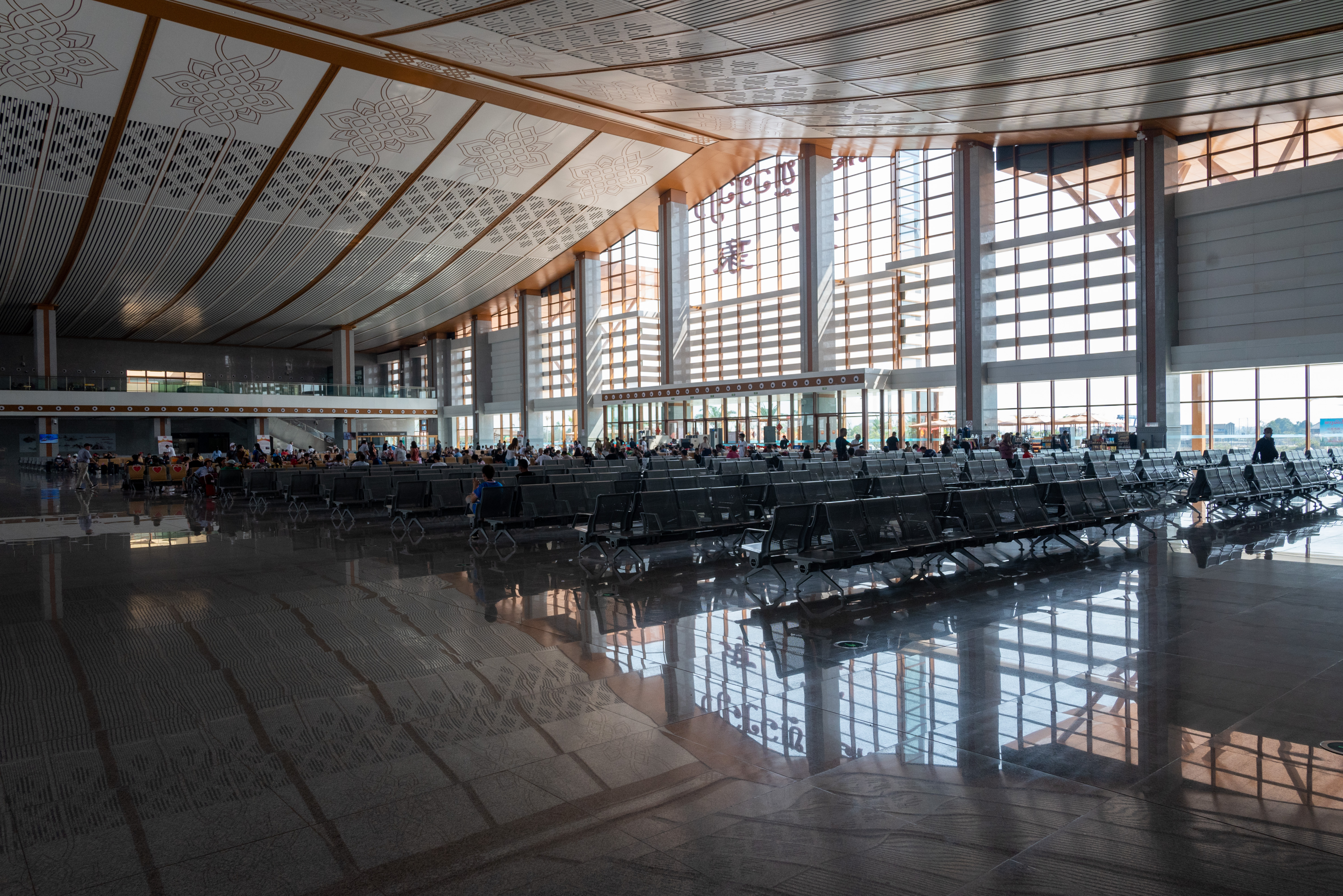
Inside Vientiane railway station

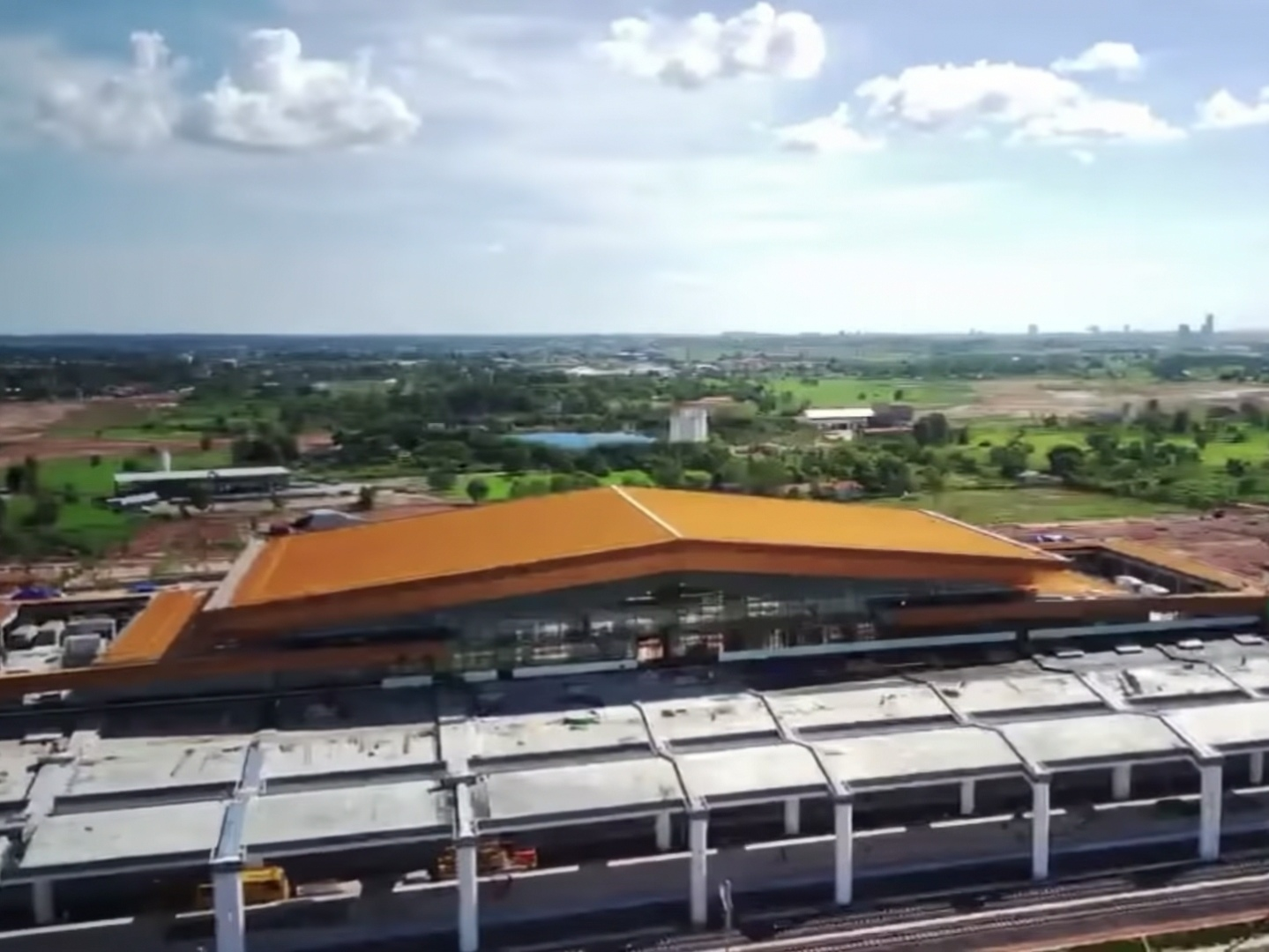
Vientiane railway station under construction in 2021
