= Boten-Vientiane through train =

Passenger train service in Laos

Overview
- Service type: K-train
- Current operator: Laos-China Railway

Route
- Termini: Boten; Vientiane
- Distance travelled: 406 km (252 mi)
- Average journey time: 5 hours 20 mins (K11); 5 hours 05 mins (K12)
- Service frequency: Daily
- Train number: K11/12
- Line used: Boten-Vientiane Railway

On-board services
- Classes: Hard Seat; Sleeper

Technical
- Rolling stock: CR Type 25G coaches
- Track gauge: 1,435 mm (4 ft 8 1/2 in)

The Boten–Vientiane through train, designated as the K11/12 service, train is a conventional passenger service operated by the Laos–China Railway, running between Boten and Vientiane. Covering a distance of 406 km, it is one of the few non-high-speed passenger services on the line. The train commenced service on 13 April 2022 to meet increased demand during the Songkran festival.

== See also ==
- Kunming-Vientiane through train
- Boten-Vientiane intercity
- Luang Prabang-Vientiane intercity
- Muang Xay-Vientiane intercity
