= Puer-Luang Prabang through train =

Overview
- Service type: International train
- Status: Terminated
- Former operator: Laos-China Railway

Route
- Termini: Puer; Luang Prabang
- Stops: Xishuangbanna; Mohan; Boten
- Train number: D85/86
- Line used: Boten-Vientiane railway

On-board services
- Classes: First Class; Second Class

Technical
- Track gauge: 1,435 mm (4 ft 8 1/2 in)
- Operating speed: 160 km/h

Puer-Luang Prabang through train, train number D85/86, is an international train that operates between Puer, China and Luang Prabang, Laos. It commenced operations on 13 April 2024.

== History ==
- 13 April 2024, D85/86 commences operation, depart every Monday, Friday and weekends.
- 13 April 2025, termini extended to Puer.
- 18 July 2025, termini extended to Kunming and Vientiane, renumbered as D86/83 and D84/85

== Rolling stock and service ==
The through train rolling stock is operated by CR200J EMU, which there are two liveries (one green and one "LCR Lancang") are operated. The EMU is attached with a canteen coach which provides diversified of cuisines on board, and announcements are in Chinese, English and Laotian.

== Operation mode ==
The train coaches are divided into Chinese and Laotian section coaches, which groups passengers who will pass through the immigration. Passengers who travel between two countries must purchase the ticket with their passport, (Note: Since Mainland China doesn't recognise ROC Passports, all Taiwan residents can buy the ticket by the Taiwan Compatriot Permit, while Hong Kong and Macau residents can buy with their local passports.) tickets can be purchased from CR 12306, LCR web and designated stations' ticket counters. Online tickets must be printed at the station.

All passengers must alight at the border stations to clear immigration inspection, the duration will be last for an hour.

== Schedule ==
=== Current schedule ===
- Information until 13 April 2025 (China is 1 hour faster than Laos)：

| D85 | | | Stop | D86 | | |
| Distance | Arrival | Departure | Stop | Departure | Arrival | Distance |
|---|---|---|---|---|---|---|
| 0 | — | 07:22 | Puer | 20:13 | — | 410 |
| 94 | 08:03 | 08:10 | Xishuangbanna | 19:27 | 19:33 | 316 |
| 206 | 08:58 | 09:02 | Mengla | 18:34 | 18:38 | 204 |
| 231 | 09:19 | 10:19 | Mohan | 17:20 | 18:20 | 179 |
↑ China(CST UTC+08:00)↑
↓ Laos(LST UTC+07:00) ↓
| 243 | 09:31 | 10:31 | Boten | 15:21 | 16:08 | 167 |
| 255 | 10:40 | 10:43 | Nateuy | ↑ | ↑ | — |
| 310 | 11:18 | 11:24 | Muang Xay | 14:46 | 14:50 | 100 |
| 410 | 12:20 | — | Luang Prabang | — | 13:35 | 0 |

== See also ==
- Kunming-Vientiane through train
- Luang Prabang-Vientiane intercity train
