= D87 =

D87 may refer to:

- HMS Cairo (D87)
- HMS Isis (D87)
- HMS Newcastle (D87)
- HMS Venturous (D87)

== See also ==
- D. 87, String Quartet No. 10 in E♭ major by Franz Schubert (1813)
- Kunming-Vientiane through train
