= D88 =

D88 may refer to:

- D 88 road (United Arab Emirates)
- HMS Capetown (D88)
- HMS Glasgow (D88)
- HMS Harpy (D88)
- HMS Wren (D88)

== See also ==
- Kunming-Vientiane through train
- My-D88 or MYD88, a protein that, in humans, is encoded by the MYD88 gene
