= Rail transport in Laos =

Laos
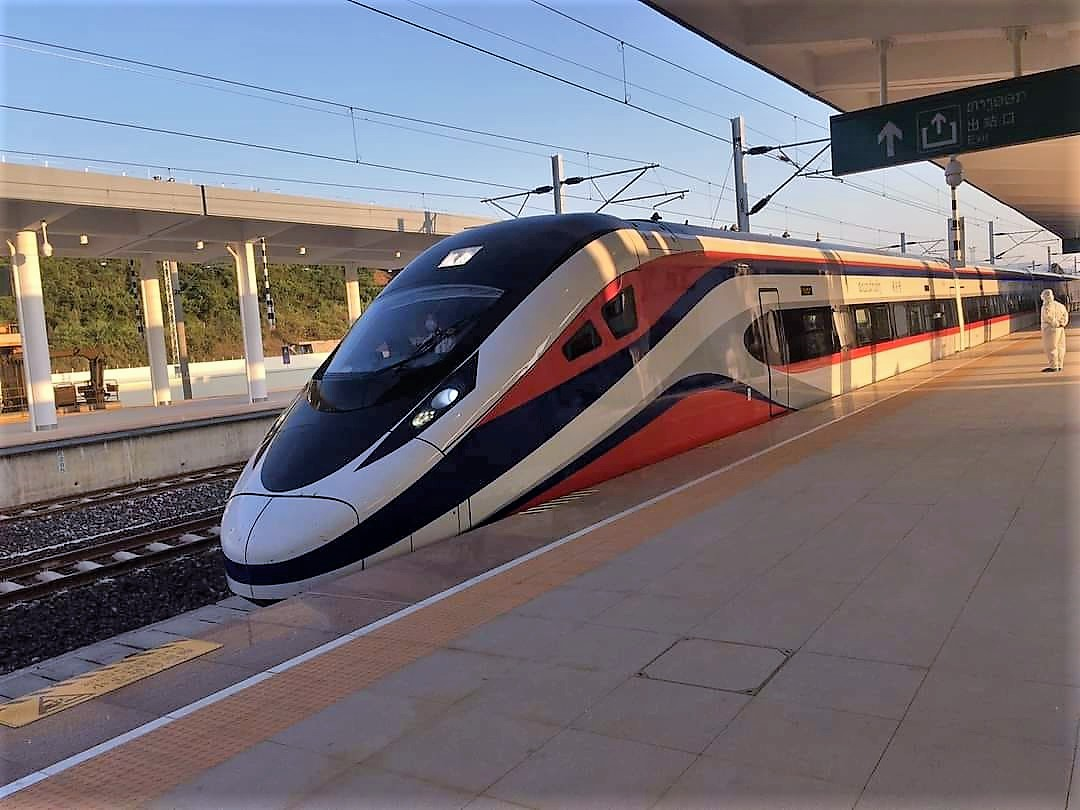
- Boten–Vientiane railway

Operation
- Infrastructure company: Laos-China Railways Company Ltd. Lao National Railway State Enterprise
- Major operators: China Railway Kunming Group Vientiane Operation and Management Center; State Railway of Thailand

System length
- Total: 434 km
- Electrified: 422 kilometres (262 mi)

Track gauge
- Main: 1,435 mm (4 ft 8 1/2 in)
- 1,435 mm (4 ft 8 1/2 in) standard gauge: 422 kilometres (262 mi)
- 1,000 mm (3 ft 3 3/8 in) metre gauge: 12 kilometres (7.5 mi)

Electrification
- Main: 25 kV 50 Hz AC
- 422 kilometres (262 mi)

Laos has 422 km (262 mi) of 1,435 mm (4 ft 8 1/2 in) standard gauge railways, primarily consisting of the Boten–Vientiane railway, which opened in December 2021. It also has a 12 km (7 mi) metre gauge railway with two stations in Vientiane, Khamsavath and Thanaleng, both of which are connected to Thailand's railway system. There are a total of 22 stations in Laos - 20 on the Boten–Vientiane railway, and 2 linking to the State Railway of Thailand.

== History ==
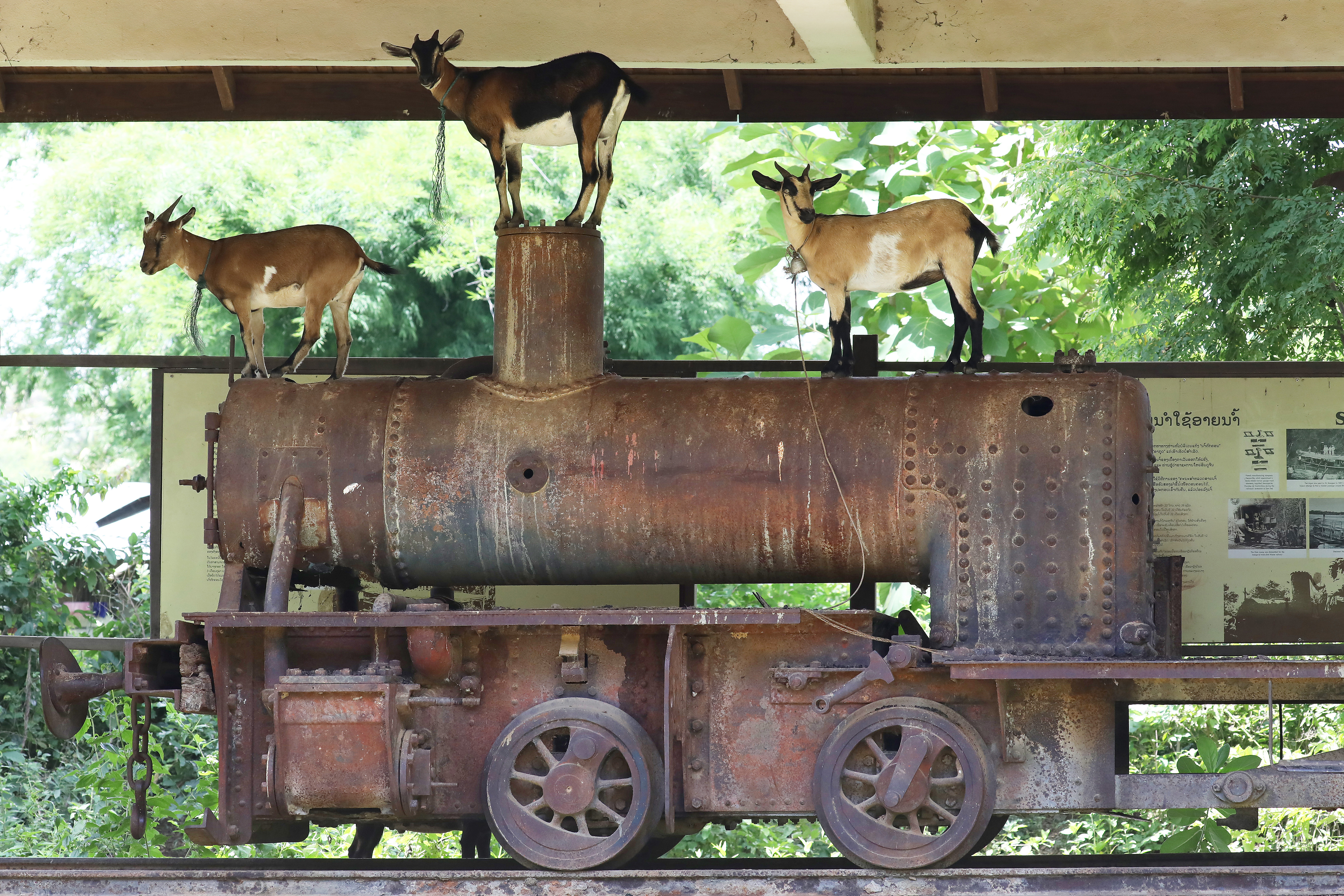
An abandoned train on show at Don Khon

Due to the mountainous geography of Laos, the country had no substantial railway infrastructure, thus traditionally rail transport has not played a significant part in Laos's transport sector.

A short portage railway, the Don Det–Don Khon narrow gauge railway, was built by the French while Laos was a part of French Indochina. The railway crossed over the islands of Don Det and Don Khon, enabling vessels, freight and passengers to travel along the Mekong River, avoiding the Khone falls which prevented navigation. The railway was abandoned in the 1940s and fell into ruin, although some remnants of the infrastructure are still in place.

In the late 1920s, work began on the Thakhek–Tan Ap railway, that would have run between Thakhek, Khammouane province and Tân Ấp station, Quảng Bình province, Vietnam through the Mụ Giạ Pass. However, the scheme was eventually scrapped in the 1930s.

It was only after the 2009 opening of the railway link from Vientiane to Thailand, as well as the 2021 opening of the Boten–Vientiane railway, connecting Vientiane to major cities in northern Laos and across the Chinese border to Kunming, that rail transport came into prominence in Laos. The railways both lie on the major railway corridor of the Kunming–Singapore railway's central line, and are also a key developmental project in Laos's national goal to become a "land-linked" economy.

== Link to Thailand ==
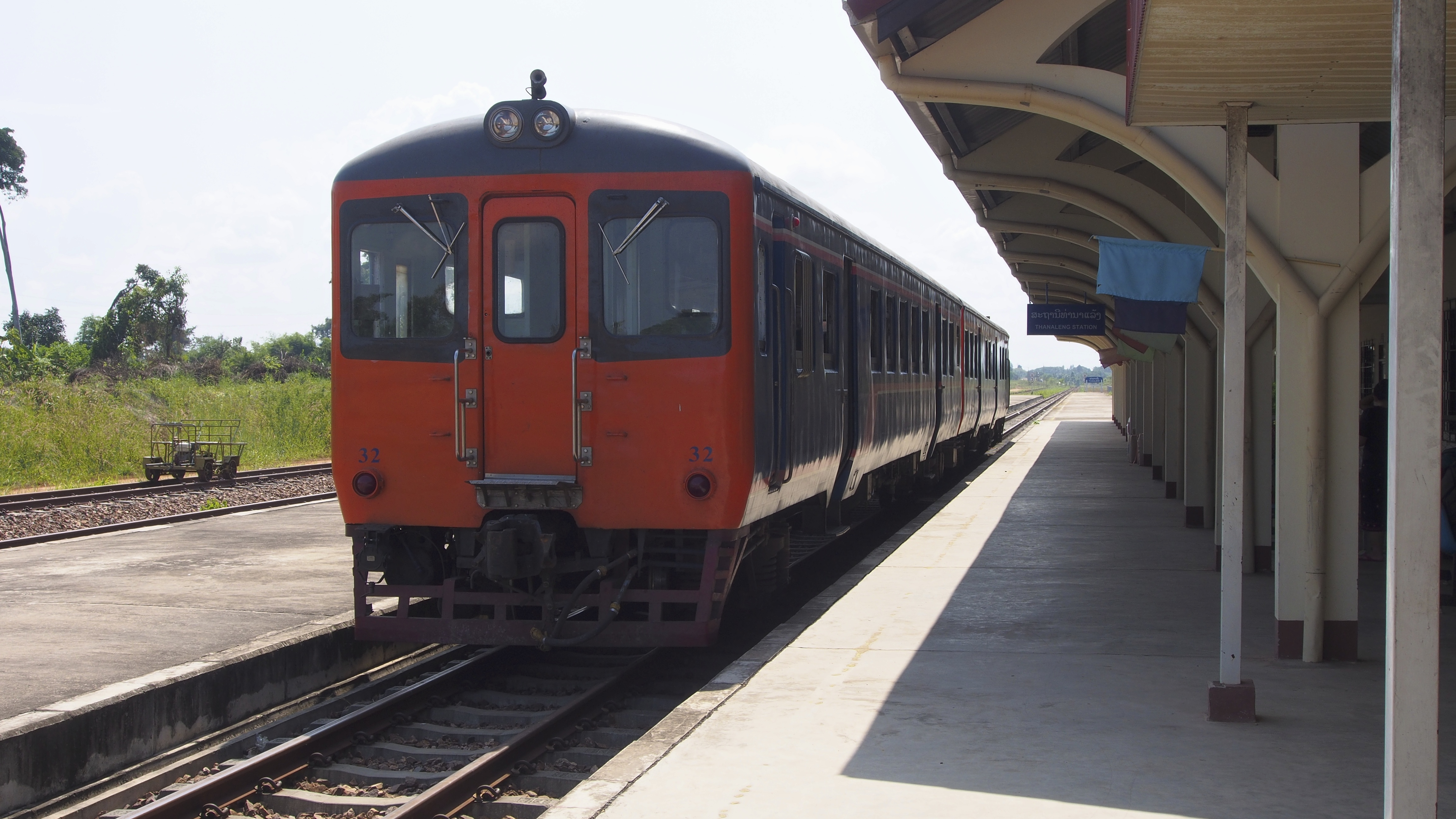
A shuttle train (now discontinued) at the railway station of Thanaleng, Laos

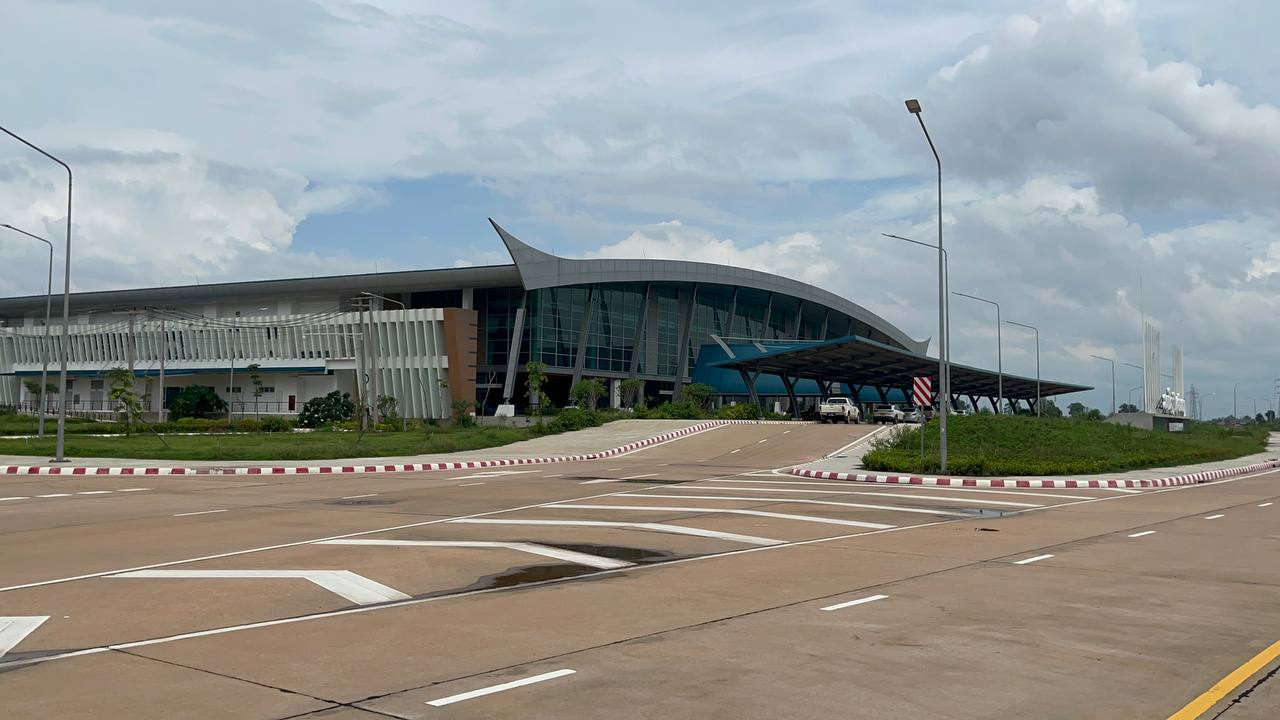
The new Vientaine Khamsavath Station, the new main terminus for trains arriving in from Bangkok and Udon Thani.

The First Thai–Lao Friendship Bridge, opened in 1994, was built with provisions for a future railway included. In January 2007, work began on a 5 kilometres (3.1 mi) extension of the metre-gauge State Railway of Thailand network across the Friendship Bridge to Thanaleng railway station, a new passenger and freight terminal in Dongphosy village, 20 kilometres (12 mi) east of Vientiane. Test trains began running on 4 July 2008, and Princess Maha Chakri Sirindhorn of Thailand formally inaugurated the line on 5 March 2009.

As of November 2010, Lao officials plan to convert the station into a rail cargo terminal for freight trains, allowing cargo to be transported from Bangkok into Laos more cheaply than via road. The Vientiane Logistics Park opened in December 2021. From 2009 to 2024, a shuttle train ran twice a day between Nong Khai railway station and Thanaleng station, with occasional services by the Eastern & Oriental Express.

This rail link expanded closer to Vientiane city, with services to the new Khamsavath railway station in Vientiane Prefecture. The station's inauguration ceremony took place on 31 October 2023. The express train runs from Bangkok to Vientiane officially opened on 19 July 2024.

== Link to Vietnam ==
A line between Savannakhet and Lao Bảo (Vietnam) has been planned since 2012. A line between Vientiane and Vũng Áng port in Hà Tĩnh province (Vietnam) via Mụ Giạ Pass has also been discussed since 2007.

In July 2022, the Lao government announced a feasibility study into the Laos-Vietnam Railway Project. This would involve the construction of a rail line in two phases. The initial phase would connect Thakhek and Vũng Áng seaport in Vietnam, a distance of 139 kilometres. The second phase would connect Thakhek with Vientiane with a 312-kilometre rail line.

== Link to China ==
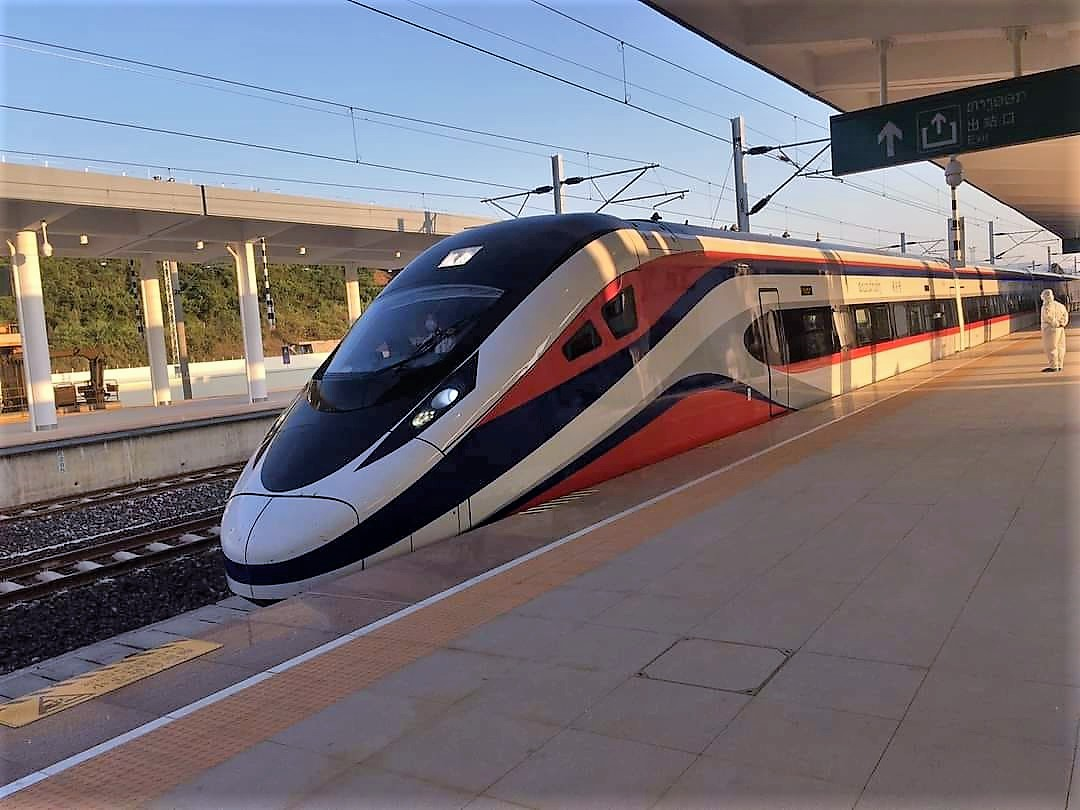
CR200J trainset at Vang Vieng station

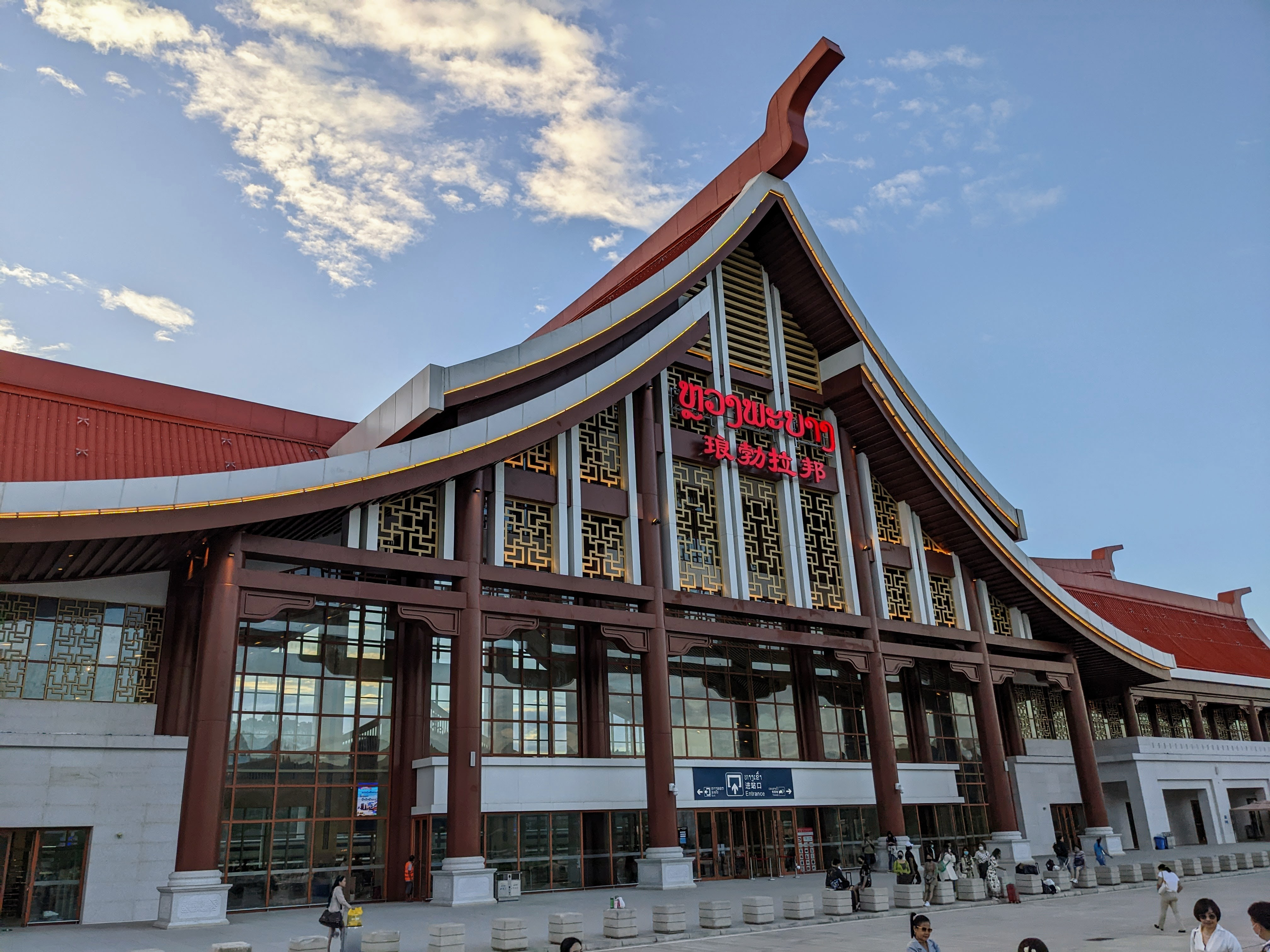
Luang Prabang railway station

Laos has a long history of negotiating with China regarding the possibility of a joint railway project. After many years of delays and negotiations, by 2015, both countries had agreed upon a revised plan and would jointly finance and operate the railway under a build-operate-transfer arrangement. Construction work worth US$1.2 billion was awarded to the China Railway Group in September 2015.

The railway was planned to link the capital Vientiane with the town of Boten at the border with China. Construction began at Luang Prabang on 25 December 2016, and the line was officially opened on 3 December 2021. The cost of the project is estimated at US$5.965 billion or RMB 37.425 billion. The railway is 60% funded with debt financing ($3.6 billion) from the Export-Import Bank of China, and the remaining 40% ($2.4 billion) by a joint venture company between the two countries, in which China holds a 70% stake.

== See also ==
- Boten–Vientiane railway
- Kunming–Singapore railway
- Transport in Laos
