= Savannakhet–Lao Bao railway =

Planned railway line in Laos

Savannakhet-Lao Bao railway

Overview
- Status: Planned
- Locale: Laos

History
- Commenced: 2013
- Planned opening: 2020

Technical
- Line length: 220 km (140 mi)
- Number of tracks: 1
- Track gauge: 1,435 mm (4 ft 8 1/2 in) standard gauge
- Electrification: Overhead line
- Operating speed: 160 km/h (100 mph) (passengers); 120 km/h (75 mph) (cargo)

The Savannakhet–Lao Bao railway (often referred to as the Laos–Vietnam railway) is a 220-kilometre (140 mi) standard gauge railway planned in southern Laos, between Lao's second largest city, Savannakhet and the small town of Lao Bảo on the border with Vietnam. Unexploded bombs that have been dropped during the Vietnam War along the route will also be removed.

== History ==
An agreement for the construction of this 220 kilometres (140 mi), $5 billion line, was signed on 5 November 2012 with a Malaysian company called Giant Consolidated Limited. On 18 September 2013, a groundbreaking ceremony was held, and the construction was to be completed in four years.

On 11 April 2016, the Laotian Ministry of Public Works and Transport approved a new rail corridor after it was reported that the previous route would have unacceptable social and environmental impacts.

Installation of corridor posts along the proposed railway right-of-way was completed in December 2016, with major construction to commence immediately after final approval from the Lao government. The project is being undertaken by Giant Rail Company Limited however, while the GRCL project roadmap on their website continues to state that the project will be completed in the middle of 2020, with opening in the second half of 2020, as of late 2021, construction is yet to start. The viability of the project also depends on a connection from the Lao Bao border checkpoint high up in the highlands of Quảng Trị Province, to the existing Vietnamese train line which runs along the coast. An ADB technical assistance report notes that this section of the line is yet to be built and there are as yet no media reports of such a plan by the Vietnamese government to build such a line, questioning the viability of the entire project. There is also no rail line connection on the Thai side of the border to Mukdahan, and a line would need to be planned to connect Mukdahan to the main Korat, Nong Khai line in Thailand, possibly at Khon Kaen, some 220 kilometres (140 mi) away. The feasibility study for the project has been completed and the Thai Cabinet has reportedly approved this project on 28 May 2019, however the project is reportedly awaiting Council of State approval of the Royal Decree and preparing the documents for bidding.

According to the Vietnamese Sources, the Vietnamese section that connects to Savannakhet - Lao Bao will be Mỹ Thủy - Đông Hà - Lao Bảo which will be implemented by 2050.

In 2019 the government of Laos started surveying of a Thakhek (Laos) to Vung Ang railway, known as the Vientiane–Vũng Áng railway.

== See also ==
- Rail transport in Laos
