= Luang Prabang-Vientiane intercity EMU train =

Passenger service train

Overview
- Service type: Intercity
- Current operators: Laos-China Railway, CR Kunming

Route
- Termini: Luang Prabang; Vientiane
- Stops: Vang Vieng
- Average journey time: 1h 46 mins to 2h 21 mins
- Train number: C83/C84, C91/C92, C97/C98

Technical
- Rolling stock: LCR200J "Lancang"

The Luang Prabang-Vientiane intercity train is a passenger service operated by Laos-China Railway under CR Kunming. It runs between Luang Prabang and Vientiane on the Boten-Vientiane railway.

The intercity train is a "C-train" in China Railways categorization, unlike the counterparts in Mainland China which runs about 300 km/h, it operates about 160 km/h.

== History ==
- 3 December 2021：Services commenced
- 13 April 2022：Commencement of C91/92
- 13 April 2023：Commencement of D887/888, termination of C91/92
- 22 January 2024：Resume of C91/92, adjust of C83/84, commencement of C85/86
- 27 May 2024：C85/86 terminated
- 10 April 2025：Commencement of C97/98

== Schedule ==
- Last update on 27 May 2024:

C97			C91		C83		Stops	C98		C92		C84		
Distance	Arrival	Departure	Arrival	Departure	Arrival	Departure	Stops	Arrival	Departure	Arrival	Departure	Arrival	Departure	Distance
0	—	10:30	—	12:50	—	18:56	Luang Prabang	09:06	—	11:47	—	18:26	—	238
125	11:33	11:37	13:41	13:46	19:47	19:51	Van Vieng	08:12	08:16	10:40	10:45	17:18	17:22	123
174	12:04	12:06	↓	↓	↓	↓	Phon Hong	↑	↑	↑	↑	16:48	16:50	64
238	12:38	—	14:56	—	20:44	—	Vientiane	—	07:20	—	09:45	—	16:05	0

== See also ==
- Xishuangbanna-Luang Prabang passenger train
- Boten-Vientiane intercity EMU train
- Van Vieng-Vientiane intercity EMU train
- Kunming-Vientiane intercity EMU train
- Boten-Vientiane express train
