= Vientiane–Vũng Áng railway =

Planned Laos-Vietnam railway

Overview
- Status: Proposed
- Locale: Laos; Vietnam

Technical
- Line length: 562 km (349 mi)
- Number of tracks: 1
- Track gauge: 1,435 mm (4 ft 8 1/2 in) standard gauge
- Operating speed: 150 km/h (95 mph)

The Vientiane–Vũng Áng railway is a proposed 1,435 mm (4 ft 8 1/2 in) standard gauge railway that would run for 562 kilometres (349 mi) between the capital of Laos, Vientiane, and Vũng Áng port in Hà Tĩnh Province via Mụ Giạ Pass on the border between Laos and Vietnam.

== Background ==
During the French colonial period, the colonial government planned to dig a system of tunnels through the mountains under Mụ Giạ Pass to serve a railway line from Tân Ấp in Vietnam to Thakhek in Laos. Due to budgetary and technical issues, the road tunnel, although already under construction, was abandoned in 1950. In 2003, the government of Laos proposed to build this route after all.

== History ==
In 2007, the Laotian Ministry of Transportation entered into discussion with Vietnam to discuss the possibility of opening a new railway line from Thakhek in Laos through the Mụ Giạ Pass to Tân Ấp Railway Station in Vietnam's Quảng Bình Province, on the North–South Railway. The proposed line would continue to the coast at Vung Ang, a port in Hà Tĩnh Province, which would provide landlocked Laos with access to the South China Sea. According to plans established by ASEAN, the line may also be extended via Thakhek all the way to the Laotian capital Vientiane. Both Laos and Thailand have expressed interest in the project as a shorter export gateway to the Pacific Ocean.

The Vientiane–Vũng Áng railway would not only connect the capital Vientiane with a Vũng Áng port, but also connect China–Laos railway to this port. In 2015, a feasibility study was started, with $3 million from the Korea International Cooperation Agency (KOICA). It concluded that the railroad was a viable project and that the project was worth pursuing. The planned route is 554.72 kilometres (344.69 mi) long, of which 102.7 kilometres (63.8 mi) will be on Vietnamese territory. The study recommends the construction of the track for a top speed of 150 km/h (95 mph). It is expected to cost $5.062 billion, of which the cost of the Vietnamese part would amount to 1.5 billion US dollars, borne by the state budget of Vietnam. South Korea proposes a public–private partnership (PPP) for the implementation of the project.

Even before the feasibility study was completed, in April 2017, the governments of Laos and Vietnam signed a letter of intent to build the railroad. The act took place during the visit of the Vietnamese Prime Minister Nguyễn Xuân Phúc to Laos. The financing of the railway line is not yet clear. It is part of a 2030 framework agreement between the two states, which includes the construction of the Vientiane–Hanoi expressway. This highway is supposed to connect the capitals of both countries.

For the 103-kilometre (64 mi) section from Vũng Áng Port to Mụ Giạ via Tân Ấp railway station, it will be implemented by the end of 2030 according to Vietnamese Sources.

At the Lao–Vietnam Investment Promotion Conference 2025 in Vientiane on December 3, 2025, officials announced that construction on the Lao section is scheduled to begin in 2026. It was also announced that Vietnam was conducting economic evaluations and initial design work, with its construction phase set to start in 2027. The railway is aimed to be completed and operational by 2030.

On March 31, 2026, a Concession Agreement was signed for the construction of Section 1 from Thakhek to Mụ Giạ that will cover a distance of 147 km. This is considered by Laos to be an important step that is supposed to lead to the start of concrete construction in the future.

The Laos–Vietnam railway is part of a project of the Government of Laos that plans to build six new railroads to provide landlocked countries with better access to world trade. In particular, better links will be established with the member states of the Association of Southeast Asian Nations (ASEAN).

The routes are:

- Nong Khai–Thanaleng railway (in operation since 2009)
- Vientiane–Boten railway (in operation since 2021)
- Vientiane–Vung Ang railway (in planning)
- Savannakhet–Lao Bao railway, which is to provide access to the Vietnamese port Đông Hà
- Thakhek–Savannakhet–Pakse–Vang Tao railway line connecting Thakhek with the Thai border
- Pakse–Veun Kham railway, which is to connect to the border with Cambodia

== See also ==
- Rail transport in Laos
- Rail transport in Vietnam
