= Xaythany district =

Xaythany district ໄຊທານີ Xaythany
- District
- Coordinates: 18°07′51″N 102°37′33″E
- Country: Laos
- Province: Vientiane Prefecture
- District: Xaythany

Population (2015)
  - District: 196,565
  - Urban: 131,317
- Time zone: UTC+7 (ICT)

New Laos National Stadium

Vientiane railway station

Xaythany is a district of Vientiane Prefecture, Laos.

A new airport will be built here to allow increased global connectivity, replacing the current Wattay International Airport in Sikhottabong district.
