= Boten–Vientiane railway =

Railway line in Laos

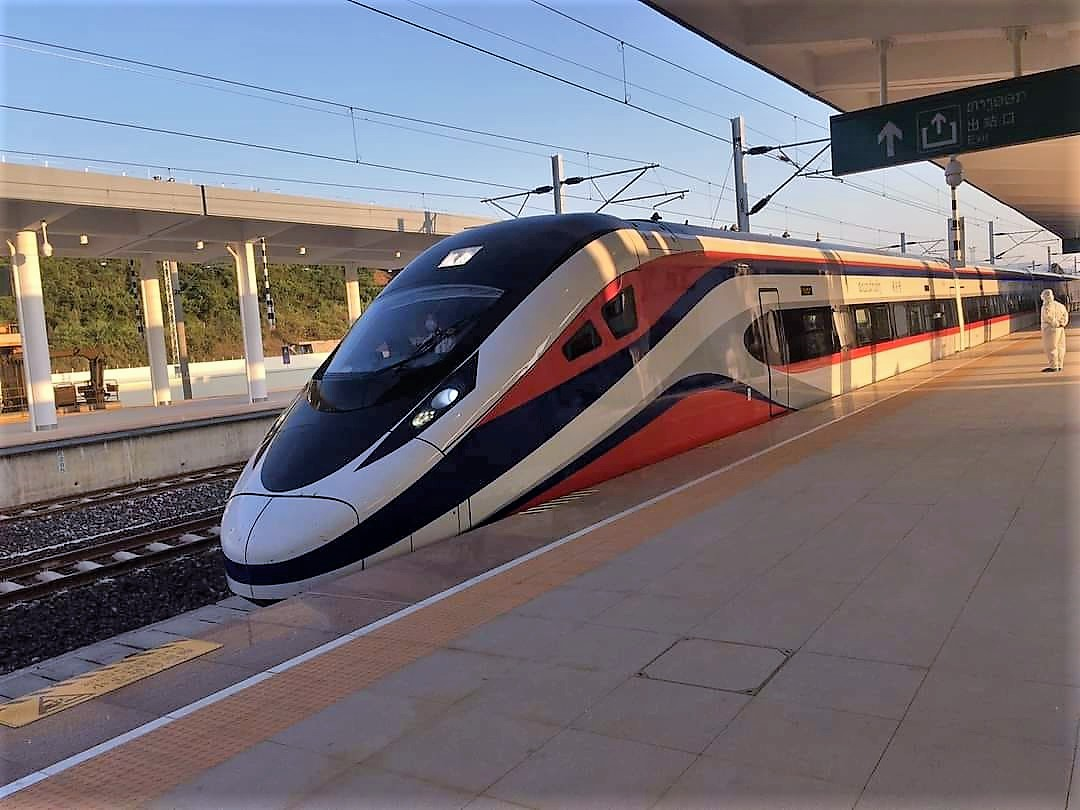
- A CR200J-train at Vang Vieng station

Overview
- Other names: Laos–China Railway; Laos section of the Kunming–Singapore railway; Laos higher-speed rail (Laos HSR)
- Native name: ທາງລົດໄຟບໍ່ເຕັນ-ວຽງຈັນ, ລົດໄຟ ລາວ ຈີນ (Lao) 磨万铁路, 中老铁路老挝段 (Chinese)
- Owner: Laos–China Railway Company Limited (LCR)
- Locale: Laos
- Termini: Boten; Vientiane (passenger) Vientiane South (cargo)
- Continues from: Yuxi–Mohan railway
- Continues as: Bangkok–Nong Khai high-speed railway (planned)
- Stations: 20

Service
- Type: Higher-speed rail; Inter-city rail; Freight rail
- Operator(s): China Railway Kunming Group
- Rolling stock: CR200J, HXD3C, 25G
- Daily ridership: 7,000~10,000(Q1,2023)

History
- Commenced: 25 December 2016
- Opened: 3 December 2021
- Completed: 12 October 2021

Technical
- Line length: 422 km (262 mi)
- Number of tracks: 1
- Character: Elevated
- Track gauge: 1,435 mm (4 ft 8 1/2 in) standard gauge
- Electrification: 25 kV 50 Hz AC overhead line
- Operating speed: Passenger: 160 km/h (100 mph); Freight: 120 km/h (75 mph)
Route map
Map

Vientiane train station

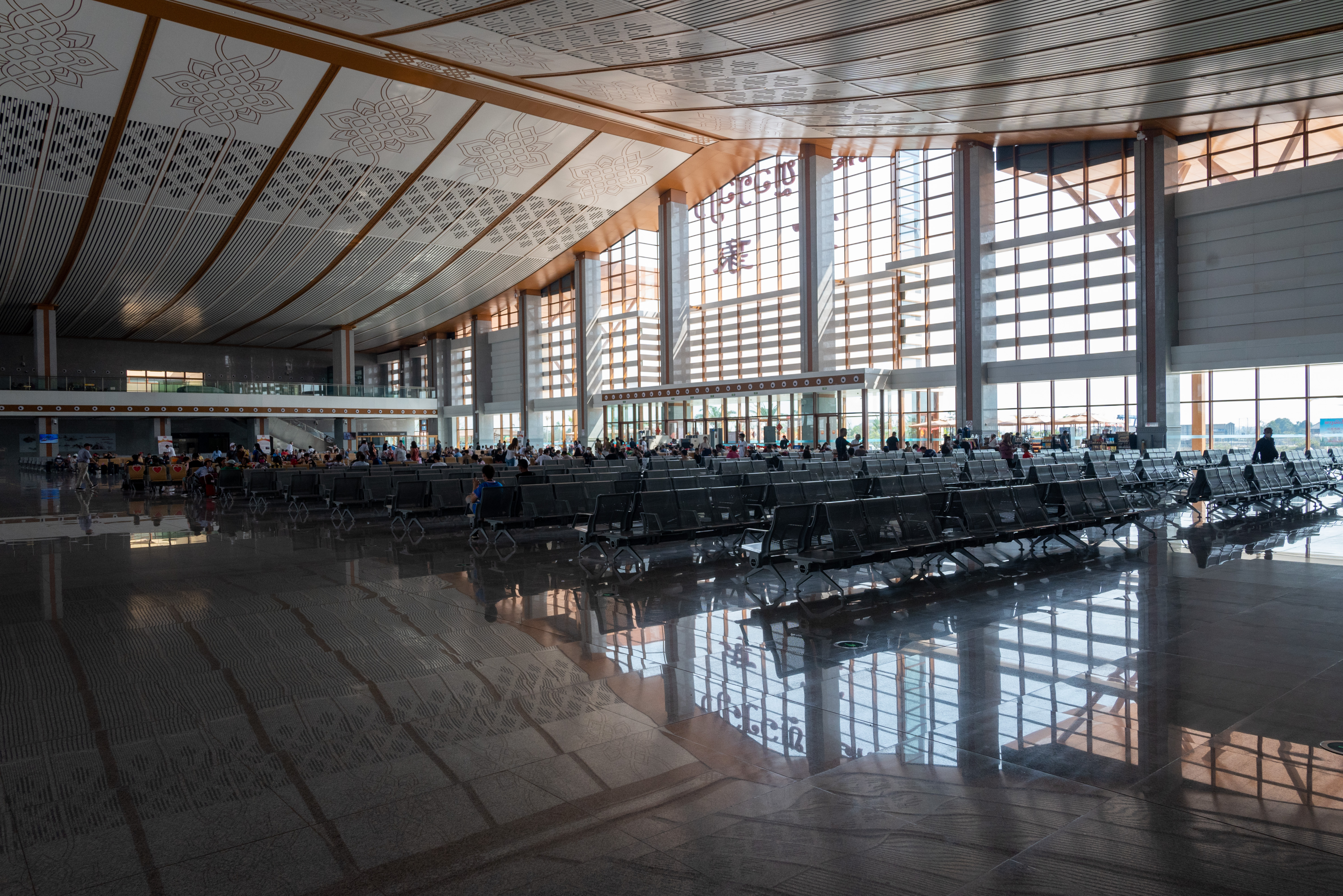
Inside the railway station at Vientiane

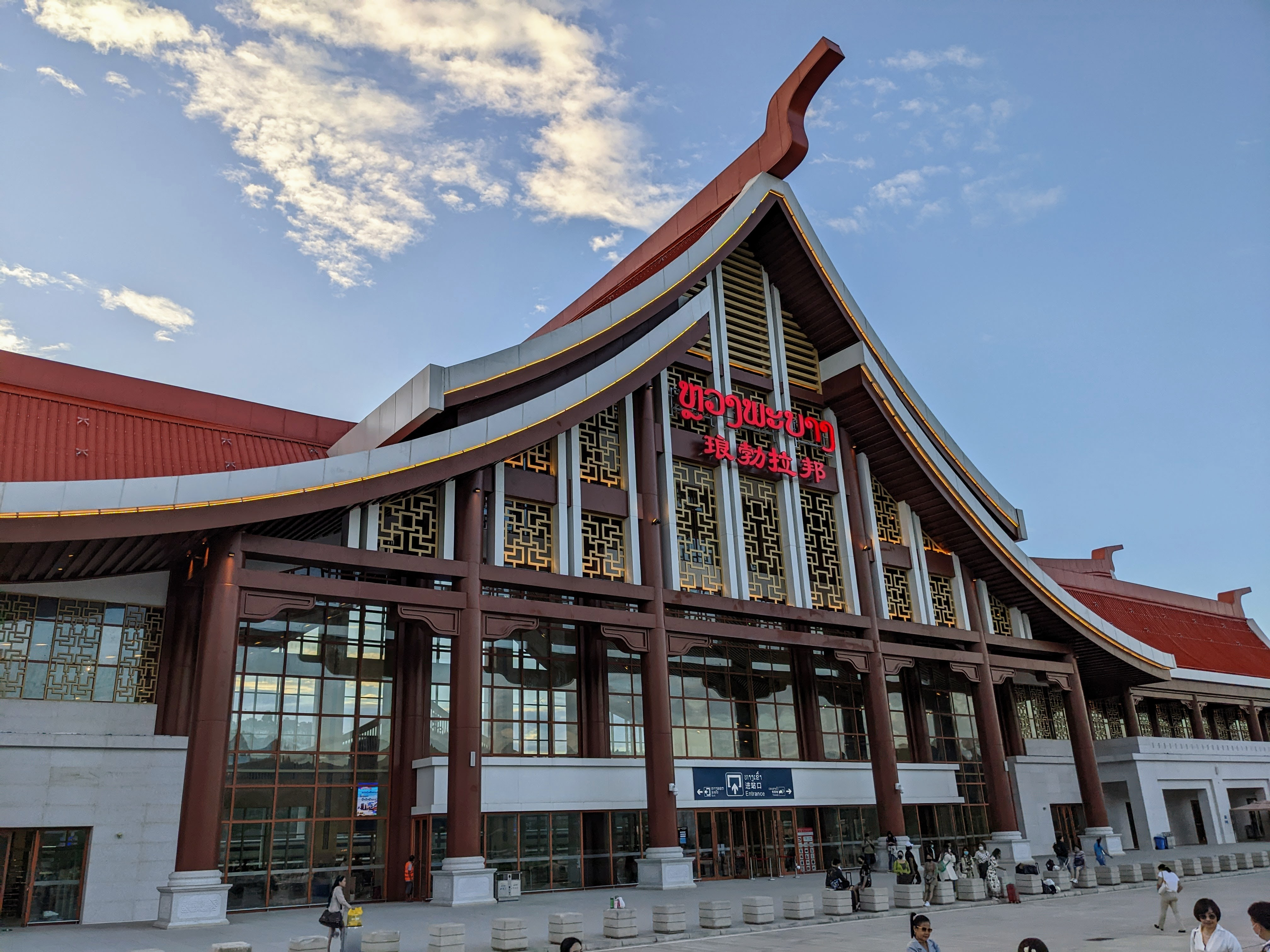
Luang Prabang Station

The Boten–Vientiane railway is a Lao section of the Laos–China Railway (LCR), running between the capital Vientiane and the northern town of Boten on the border with Yunnan, China. The line was officially opened on 3 December 2021.

A collaborative project between Laos and China, the line's northern end is directly connected to the Chinese rail system at Mohan in Yunnan, through the Yuxi–Mohan railway, and has provisions in the south to link up with the Bangkok–Nong Khai high-speed railway in Thailand and possibly all the way to Singapore via HSR. The railway ends at Vientiane South cargo station. The Boten–Vientiane railway is an integral section of the central line on the Kunming–Singapore railway, and was constructed as part of the Belt and Road Initiative (BRI).

== History ==
The railway is part of the Laos–China Railway which is in turn part of the broader Laos–China Economic Corridor.

=== Planning ===
Laos is the only landlocked country in Southeast Asia, which burdens it with a disadvantage in trade. During French rule, the French failed to develop a plan to build railways in Laos, with only the 7 km (4.3 mi) Don Det–Don Khon railway being completed. A railway link from China through Laos would greatly reduce cargo transit times and transportation costs between the two countries.

The first talks about the railway linking Laos and China began in 2001. A Lao politician of Chinese descent, Somsavat Lengsavad, was reportedly the driving force behind the project on the Laotian side. In October 2010, plans were announced for a 530 kilometres (330 mi) standard gauge railway linking Vientiane to Xishuangbanna, in Yunnan province in China. Construction was expected to begin in 2011, for completion in 2014. There are plans to extend this railway south, from Vientiane across the Thai border to Bangkok.

The project initially stalled in the wake of the 2011 corruption scandal involving China's minister of railways, Liu Zhijun, but negotiations continued. In November 2012, the Laotian press reported that the money for the construction of the railway would be borrowed from the Export–Import Bank of China, and construction would be started in 2013 and completed in 2018. By 2015, a revised plan was agreed upon, under which both countries would jointly finance and operate the railway with a build-operate-transfer arrangement. Construction work worth US$1.2 billion was awarded to the China Railway Group in September 2015.

=== Construction and completion ===
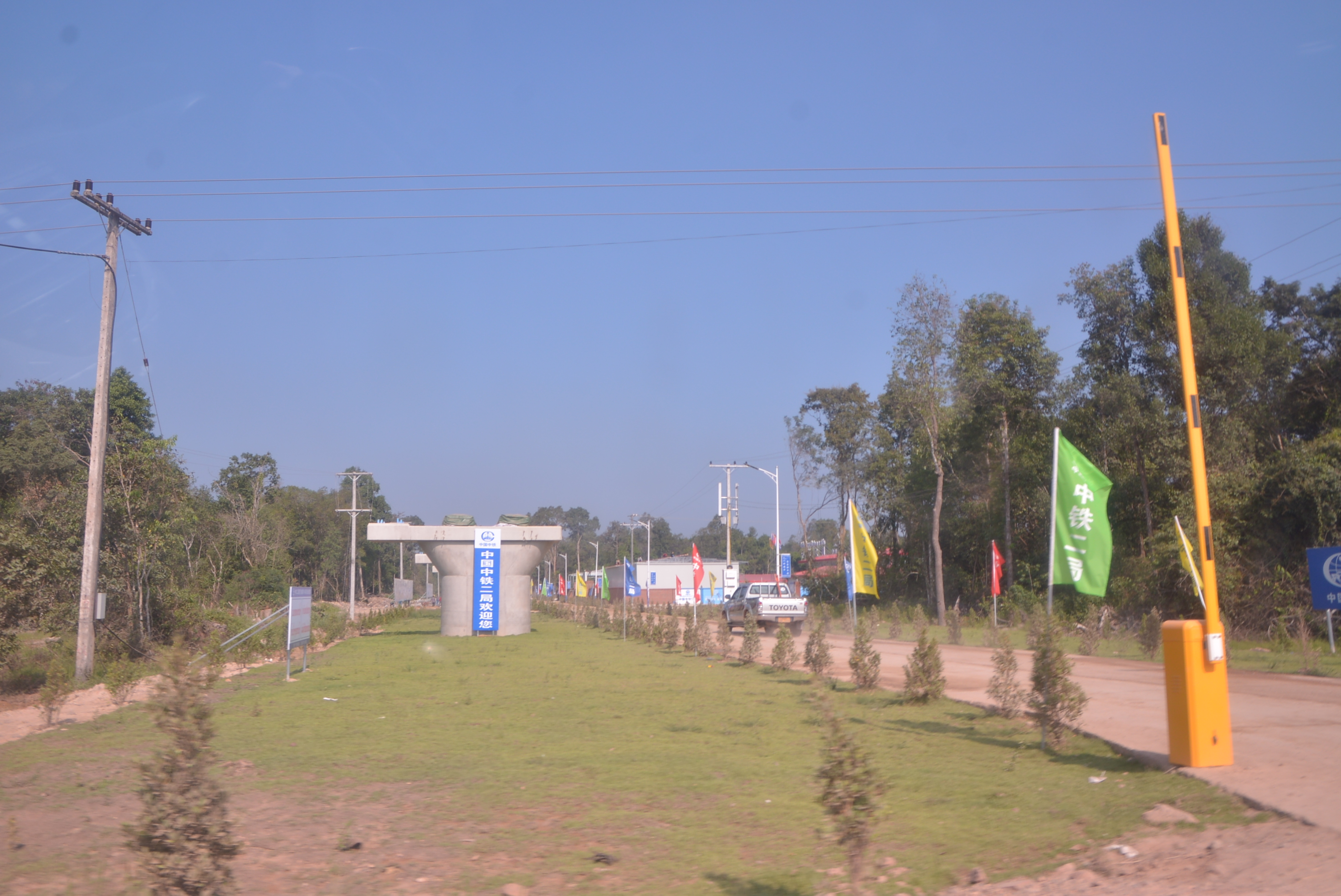
Viaduct under construction at Vientiane Prefecture

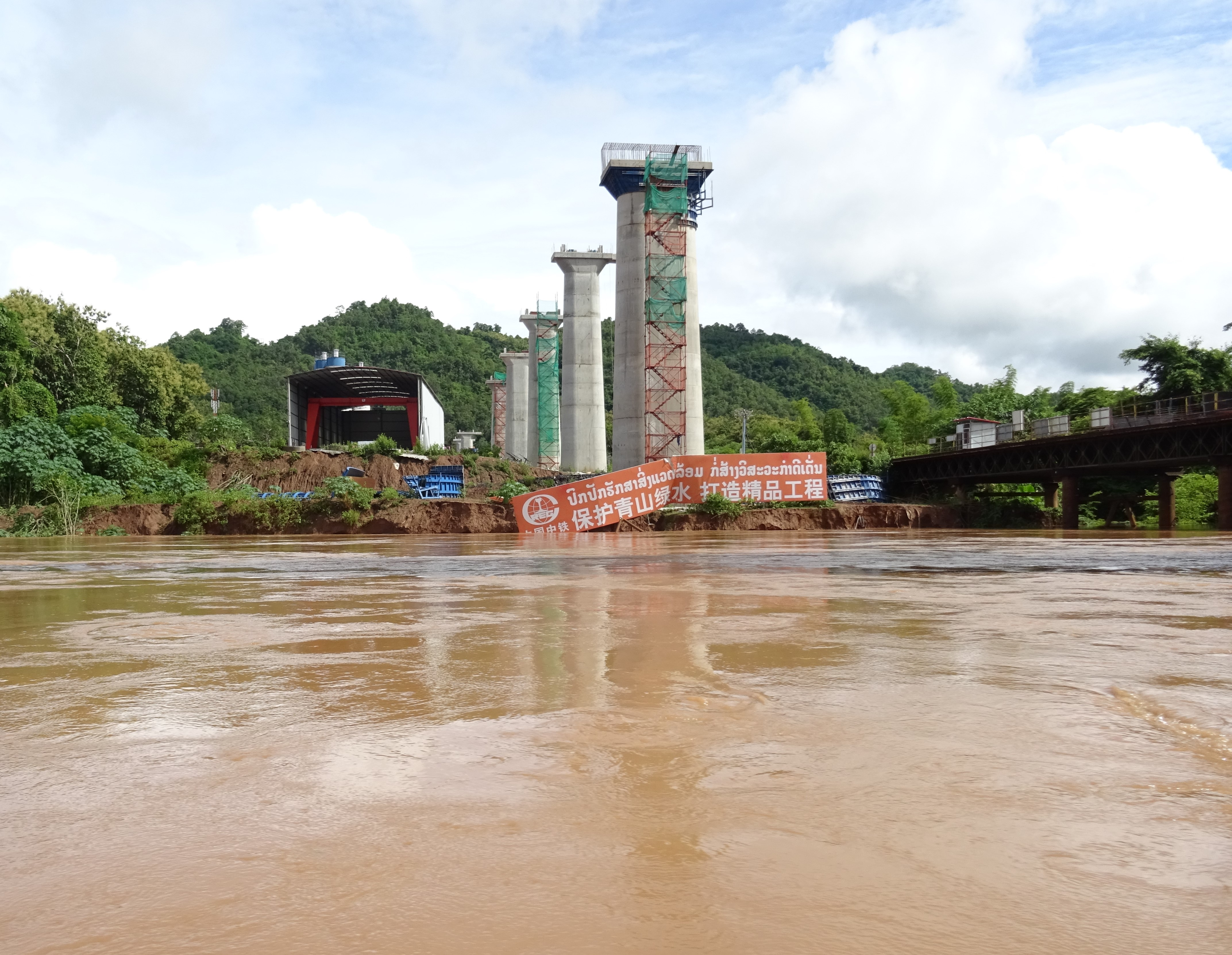
Bridge construction in Luang Prabang Province

Construction began at Luang Prabang on 25 December 2016. At the end of 2017, the construction phase was 20% completed, and in September 2019 progress was reported as 80% completed. Unexploded bombs that have been dropped during the Vietnam War would also be removed along the route.

As of June 2020, Chinese state media reported that the US$6 billion project was 90% complete. Work crews started laying track in Laos in March 2020, five years after breaking ground. With all of the hundreds of tunnels, bridges and viaducts completed, cargo service was scheduled to start from December 2021. In April 2021, the northernmost section in Luang Namtha Province was 97% complete. Track laying of the last section in Oudomxay Province would be completed in May, leaving the project well on track for a 2021 opening. Track-laying was officially completed on 12 October 2021. The first EMU was delivered to Vientiane on 16 October 2021, and the line opened on 3 December 2021, a day after the 46th anniversary of the Lao PDR.

The railway is expected to boost tourism, with passenger traffic to account for the majority of traffic on the line. The Thai province of Nong Khai is also expected to gain more visitors through the railway, as well as fruit exports from Thailand to China benefiting from reduced transportation costs.

As of 2024, it is the most significant Belt and Road Initiative project in Laos.

== Future expansion ==
Since the line uses a different rail gauge from the existing Thai Northeastern Line link from Bangkok to Vientiane, running into Thailand is not yet possible for passenger trains. A branch to "Thanaleng Dry Port" and "Vientiane South" was completed in July 2022, allowing transfer of cargo between Thai metre-gauge railway and China standard-gauge railway.

However, the Vientiane end of the line will eventually cross the Mekong River on a new bridge to meet up with the Bangkok–Nong Khai high-speed railway once it is completed, making the connection. As of 2023, the design of this extension is in progress with a target completion date of 2028.

== Financing ==
The cost of the project is estimated at US$5.965 billion or RMB 37.425 billion. The railway is 60% funded with debt financing ($3.6 billion) from the Export–Import Bank of China, and the remaining 40% ($2.4 billion) by a joint venture company between the two countries, in which China holds a 70% stake. Of the remaining 30%, the Laotian government disburses $250 million from its national budget and borrows $480 million further from the Export–Import Bank of China. It is the most expensive and largest project to be constructed in Laos as of 2021.

The cost of the railway has contributed to a US$480 million increase in Lao debt to the Export–Import Bank of China. Western publications subsequently claimed that Laos could end up falling into a default on its debts. In 2019, the Australian think-tank Lowy Institute estimated Laos' debt to China at 45% of its GDP. In 2020, American credit agency Fitch Ratings assigned Laos a 'CCC' credit rating, stating that the country has "excessive debt".

== Ridership ==
China State Railway Group, and Chinese and Laotian authorities report combined cumulative passenger and cargo volumes on both the Lao and China sections of the Lao–China Railway each 4 December, the anniversary of its opening in 2021.

Cumulative Passenger and Cargo Volume on the Lao–China Railway
Route	Unit	04-Dec-22	04-Dec-23	04-Dec-24	04-Dec-25
Cross-border passengers	million passengers	0	No data	0.346	0.640
Total passengers	million passengers	8.5	24.1	43.0	62.5
Cross-border cargo	million tonnes	1.9	6.1	10.6	16
Total cargo	million tonnes	11.2	29.1	48.3	72.5

== Infrastructure ==
47% of the railway is spanned over 75 tunnels and 15% is set on viaducts spread over 167 bridges. Vientiane railway station, the largest station on the railway, is situated in Xay Village in Xaythany District and consists of four platforms with seven track lines and two additional platforms with three lines reserved; it is expected to connect with other railway lines planned for Laos. The station can accommodate up to 2,500 passengers with a total area of 14,543 square metres.

The railway is built on a single track with passing loops and is electrified to China's Class I trunk railway standards, suitable for 160 km/h (100 mph) passenger and 120 km/h (75 mph) freight trains, making Laos the first country to connect to the Chinese high-speed railway network using Chinese technology.

=== Rolling stock ===
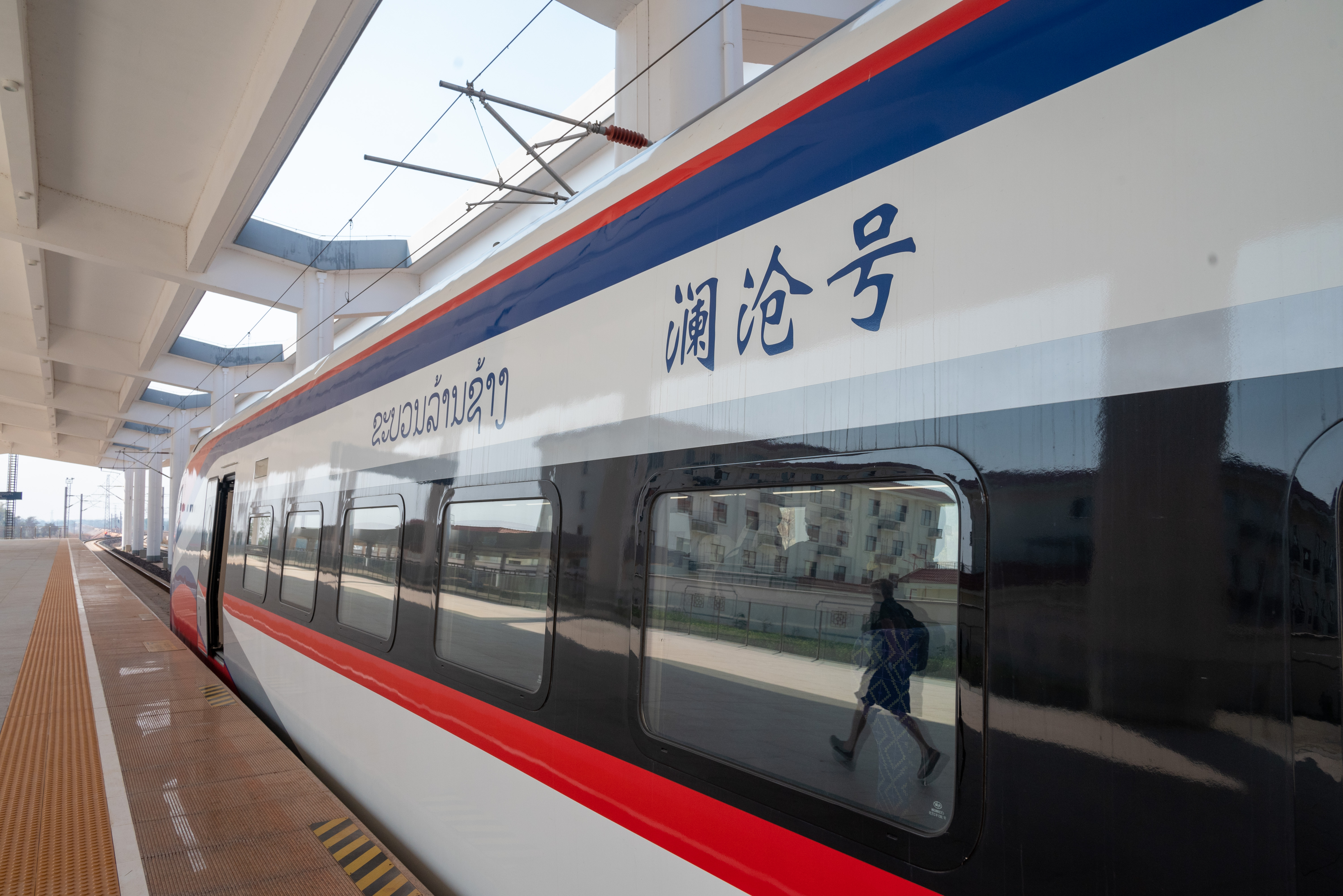
A higher-speed CR200J trainsets, with bilingual signage in Laotian and Chinese

Passenger services employ CR200J trainsets for express passenger train and China Railway 25G passenger coaches for ordinary passenger train, and for freight hauling and normal passenger service, HXD3CA locomotives are used.

=== Cargo ===
On 4 December 2021, a day after opening the China–Laos railway, the Vientiane Logistics Park, one of a total of nine logistics centres in Laos, was officially opened by Prime Minister Phankham Viphavanh at Thanaleng.

=== List of stations ===
A total of 32 stations are planned along the line, of which 21 stations were initially constructed, including 10 passenger stations and 11 cargo stations:

Station name	Station type	km	Cumulative travel time (h:m)	
Station name	Station type	km	Fast Train	Ordinary Train
Moding (Boten)	passenger, major	0	0:00	0:00
Na Teuy	passenger	13	0:09	0:11
Na Moh	passenger	28	—	0:26
Na Thong	cargo	38	—	—
Muang Xay	passenger	67	0:39	0:57
Na Khok	cargo	97	—	—
Muang Nga	passenger	113	—	1:34
Huoay Han	cargo	135	—	—
Luang Prabang	passenger, major	168	1:31	2:15
Xiang Ngeun	cargo	177	—	—
Phou Khoun	cargo	209	—	—
Kasi	passenger	239	—	3:04
Pha Daeng	cargo	256	—	—
Vang Vieng	passenger, major	283	2:31	3:41
Vang Khi	cargo	310	—	—
Phon Hong	passenger	342	—	4:23
Phon Soung	cargo	372	—	—
Vientiane North	cargo	388	—	—
Vientiane	passenger, major	406	3:35	5:15
Vientiane South	cargo	419	—	—

== Controversies ==
Radio Free Asia reported in October 2021 that some Lao villagers displaced from their land by the line's construction complained that they had still not received compensation. Since then, Radio Free Asia reported that around 85% of affected families had had their compensation claims resolved (as of August 2023), with some landowners still holding out for increased compensation.

In the first year of operation, the railway only allowed ticket purchases up to three days in advance and online sales were not available. That resulted in extremely long lines at ticket offices, and express trains often sold out the day ticket sales opened. This has since been ameliorated with the LCR mobile app, which allows online purchase of tickets.

== See also ==
- Rail transport in Laos
- Vientiane–Boten Expressway
- Railway stations in Laos
- China–Laos relations
- CR Yuxi–Mohan railway
- MRL East Coast Rail Link
