= Kunming-Vientiane through train =

Luxury train in Laos

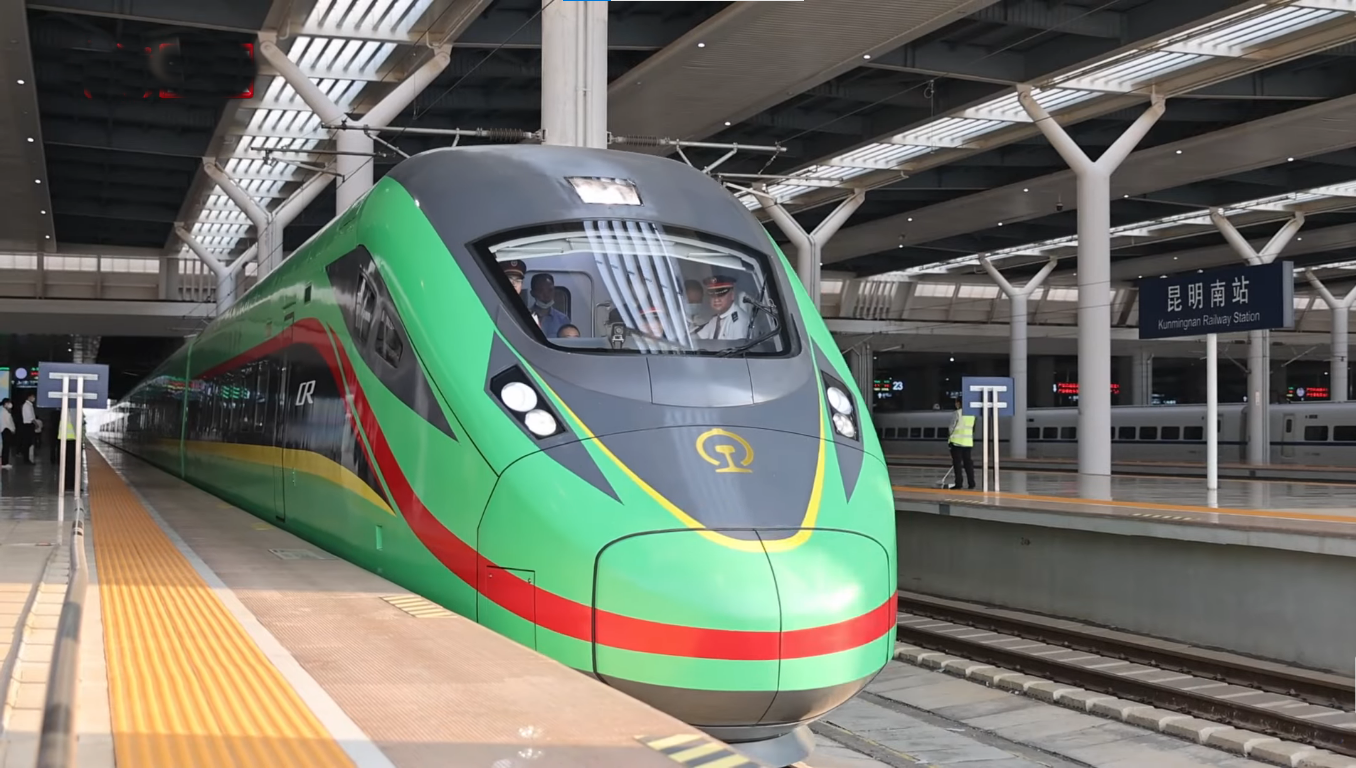

Overview
- Service type: International train
- Status: Operating
- Current operator: Laos-China Railway (subsidiary of CR Kunming)

Route
- Termini: Kunming; Vientiane
- Stops: Puer; Mohan; Boten; Luang Prabang
- Service frequency: Daily
- Train numbers: D87/88, D86/83 and D84/85

On-board services
- Classes: First class Second class
- Seating arrangements: 2-2 First class 2-3 Second class
- Catering facilities: Yes

Technical
- Rolling stock: CR200J EMU "Fuxing"

Kunming-Vientiane through train, also known as Sino-Laos international passenger train. It operates between Kunming, Yunnan to Vientiane, Laos under the train no. D87/88. Operation commenced on 13 April 2023.

The train service has made landmarks in Chinese railway history. It is the nation's first EMU international train, first CR international train with all stations and the route owned by CR, first fully electrified international train, first international train running up to 160 km/h and the first international train that supports purchases from 12306.

== Operational history ==
Boten–Vientiane railway commenced operations on 3 December 2021, however due to COVID-19, only freight services run the full line and the passenger service runs domestic service. On 10 April 2023, CR announced that from 13 April 2023 passenger train service between Kunming South and Vientiane will commence operations, it operates under the train no. D887/888.

The first southbound train departed from Kunming South at 8:08am 13 April 2023, and the northbound train from Vientiane departed an hour later. The first-day train tickets are sold out on that day.

From 26 July 2023, the train is rescheduled to shorten the immigration processing duration, thus the travel time reduced 64 mins from 10.5 hrs to 9 hrs 26 mins.

On 10 January 2024, D887/888 was rescheduled as D87/88.

From 18 July 2025, the former Puer-Luang Prabang through train extend termini to Kunming and Vientiane, which the original train number D85/86 renumbered as D86/83 and D84/85.

== Rolling stock and services ==
The through train rolling stock is operated by CR200J EMU, which there are two liveries (one green and one "LCR Lancang") are operated. The EMU is attached with a canteen coach which provides diversified of cuisines on board, and announcements are in Chinese, English and Laotian.

== Operation mode ==
The train coaches are divided into Chinese and Laotian section coaches, which groups passengers who will pass through the immigration. Passengers who travel between two countries must purchase the ticket with their passport, (Note: Since Mainland China doesn't recognise ROC Passports, all Taiwan residents can buy the ticket by the Taiwan Compatriot Permit, while Hong Kong and Macau residents can buy with their local passports.) tickets can be purchased from CR 12306, LCR web and designated stations' ticket counters. Online tickets must be printed at the station.The price for full journey is RMB 542 for second class and RMB 864.

All passengers must alight at the border stations to clear immigration inspection, the duration will be last for an hour.

On 10 September 2025, China and Laos agreed to set up a joint checkpoint at Mohan and Boten stations for juxtaposed passport control to reduce travel time.

== Schedule ==
- Kunming South to Vientiane as of 10 April 2024 (China is 1 hour ahead of Laos)：

D87			Stop	D88		
Distance	Arrival	Departure	Stop	Departure	Arrival	Distance
0	—	08:08	Kunming South	18:34	—	996
88	08:45	08:49	Yuxi	17:52	17:56	908
346	10:38	10:42	Puer	15:56	16:00	650
440	11:24	11:30	Xishuangbanna	15:10	15:16	556
577	12:31	13:23	Mohan	13:19	14:11	419
↑ China（CST UTC+08:00） ↑
↓ Laos（Laos Time UTC+07:00） ↓
590	12:35	13:27	Boten	11:17	12:07	406
657	13:57	14:00	Muang Xay	10:43	10:46	339
758	14:54	14:58	Luang Prabang	09:45	09:49	238
883	15:49	15:52	Van Vieng	08:52	08:55	123
996	16:44	—	Vientiane	—	08:00	0

- Kunming to Vientiane as of 18 July 2025 (China is 1 hour ahead of Laos)：

Distance	D86/3		Stop	D84/5		Distance
Distance	Arrival	Departure	Stop	Arrival	Departure	Distance
0	—	10:55	Kunming	22:08	—	1023
28	11:14	11:20	Kunming South	21:44	21:48	995
374	13:42	13:46	Puer	19:15	19:19	649
468	14:30	14:36	Xishuangbanna	18:28	18:34	555
605	15:50	16:42	Mohan	16:37	17:29	418
↑ China（CST UTC+08:00） ↑
↓ Laos（Laos Time UTC+07:00） ↓
617	15:54	16:44	Boten	14:31	15:25	406
684	17:15	17:18	Muang Xay	↑	↑	—
784	18:07	18:11	Luang Prabang	13:11	13:15	239
900	19:02	19:06	Van Vieng	12:17	12:20	123
1023	19:59	—	Vientiane	—	11:25	0

== See also ==
- Xishuangbanna-Luang Prabang EMU train
- Boten-Vientiane intercity train
- Luang Prabang-Vientiane intercity EMU train
- Van Vieng-Vientiane intercity train
- Boten-Vientiane express train
