= Boten railway station =

Railway station in Boten, Laos

Boten ບໍ່ເຕັນ
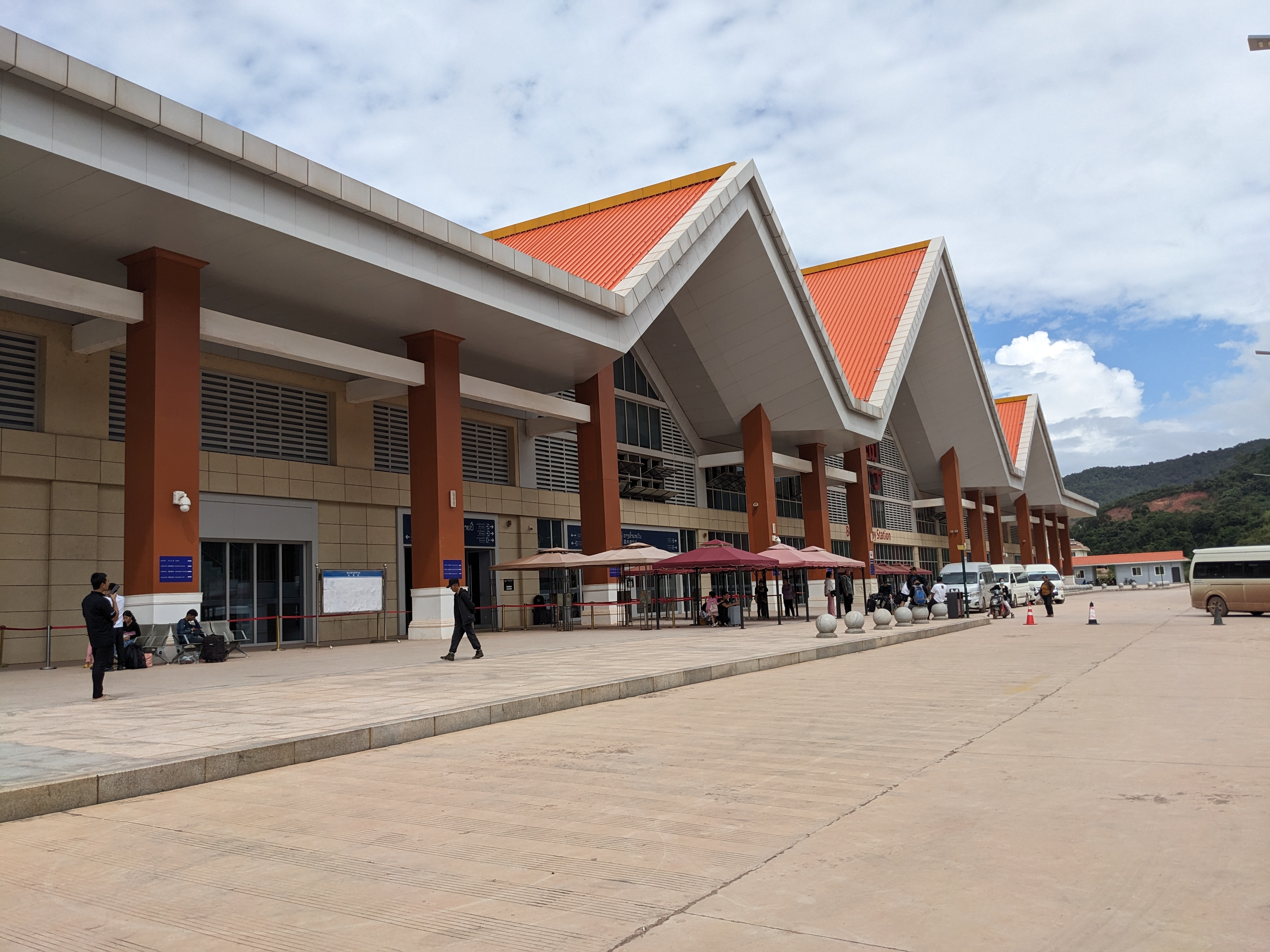
- The front of the station in 2023.

General information
- Location: Moding, Boten; Luang Namtha Province; Laos
- Coordinates: 21°9′17″N 101°40′18″E
- Owner: Laos–China Railway Company Limited
- Operator: CR Kunming
- Manager: Lao National Railway State Enterprise
- Platforms: 3
- Tracks: 8

Construction
- Structure type: Elevated concrete building
- Architect: China Railway Construction
- Architectural style: Laotian

History
- Opened: 3 December 2021

Services
Preceding station	China Railway	Following station
through to Yuxi–Mohan railway	Boten–Vientiane railway	Nateuy towards Vientiane South
Location

Boten railway station (Chinese: 磨丁站, Lao: ສະຖານີບໍ່ເຕັນ) is a railway station in Boten, Laos. It is the northernmost intermediate stop, and the final stop in Laos on the Boten–Vientiane railway. It opened along with the rest of the line on 3 December 2021.

The custom facility at the station does not issue Laos visa-on-arrival, but accepts eVisa.
