= Luang Prabang railway station =

Railway station in Laos

Luang Prabang ຫຼວງພະບາງ
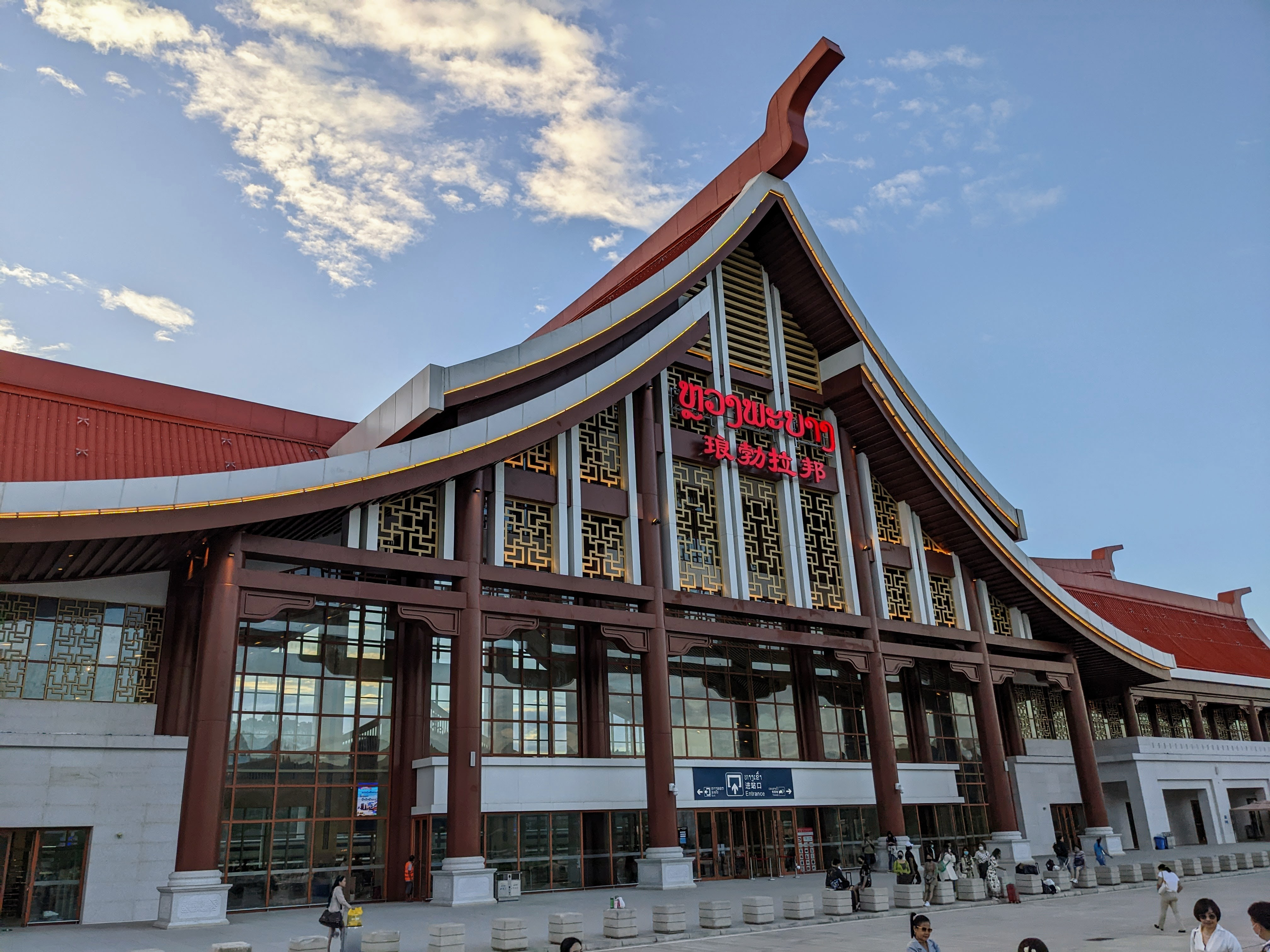

General information
- Location: Luang Prabang; Luang Prabang Province; Laos
- Coordinates: 19°52′3″N 102°12′50″E
- Owner: Laos–China Railway Company Limited
- Operator: CR Kunming
- Manager: Lao National Railway State Enterprise
- Line: Boten–Vientiane railway
- Platforms: 2
- Tracks: 4

Construction
- Accessible: Yes
- Architect: China Railway Construction

History
- Opened: 3 December 2021

Services
Preceding station	China Railway	Following station
Huoay Han towards Boten	Boten–Vientiane railway	Xiang Ngoen towards Vientiane South
Location

Luang Prabang railway station (Lao: ສະຖານີ ຫຼວງພະບາງ, Chinese: 琅勃拉邦站) is a railway station in Luang Prabang, Laos. It is the 9th station on the Boten–Vientiane railway. The main building was completed on 3 December 2020 and the station was opened along with the rest of the line on 3 December 2021.

The station building sits on 7,970 square metres (85,800 sq ft) of land and has two platforms and four tracks as well as a station hall that can accommodate 1,200 passengers.

== Gallery ==
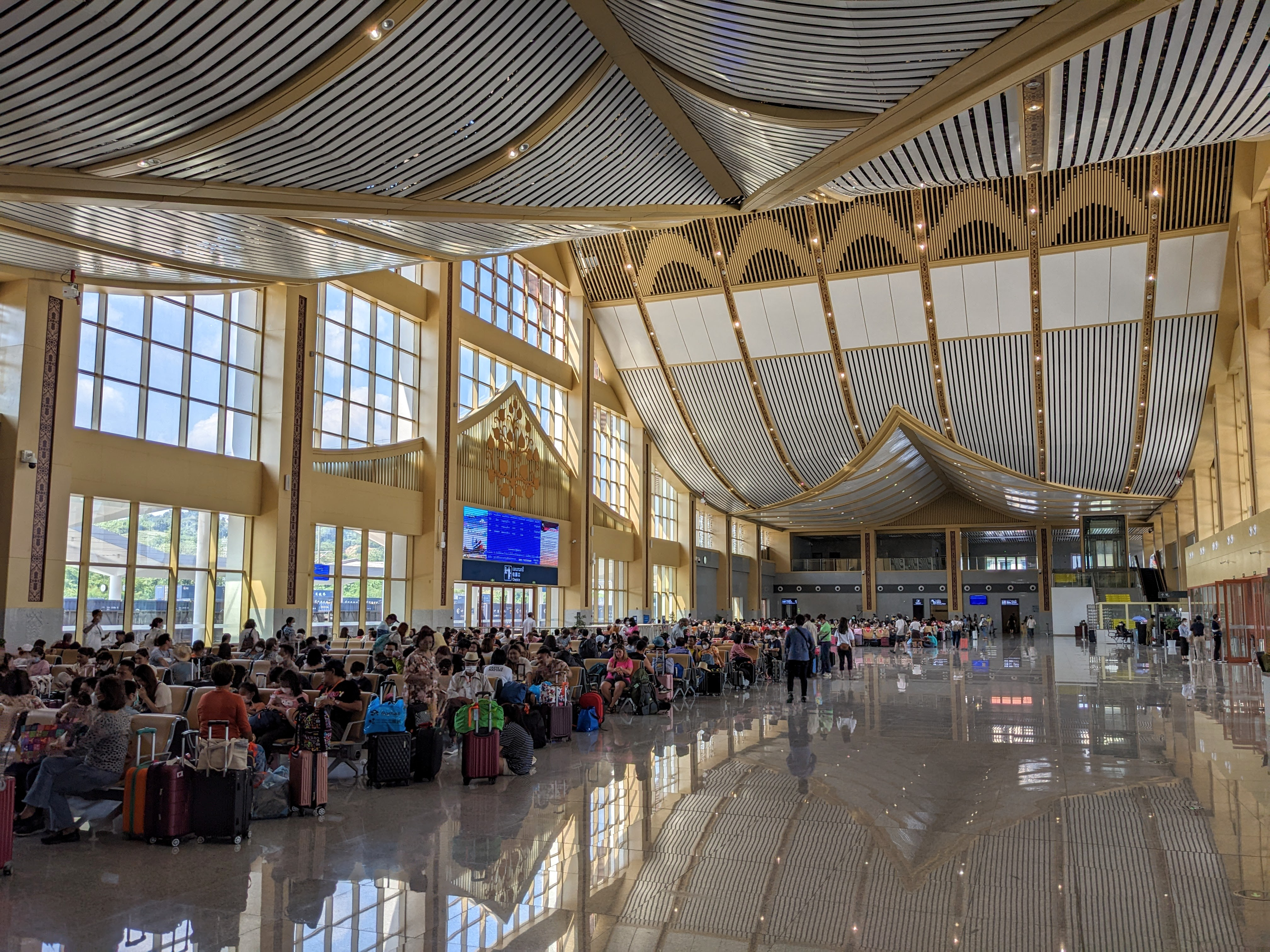
Inside Luang Prabang railway station

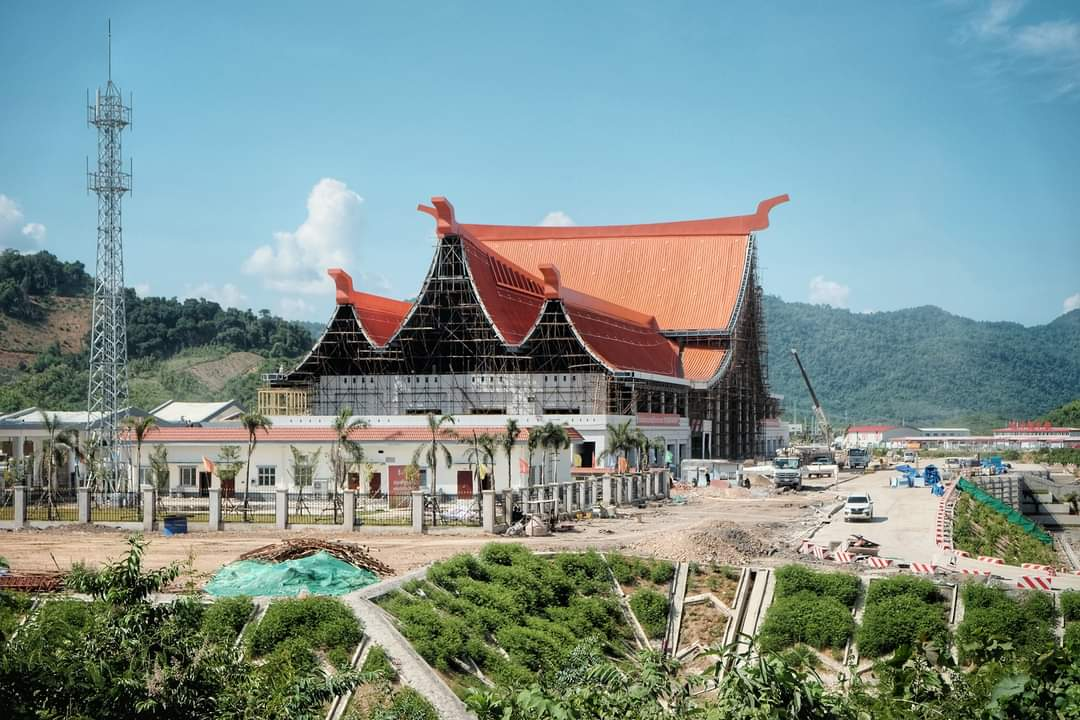
Luang Prabang station under construction in 2021
