= China Railway Kunming Group =

Chinese railway operator

China Railway Kunming Group Co., Ltd.
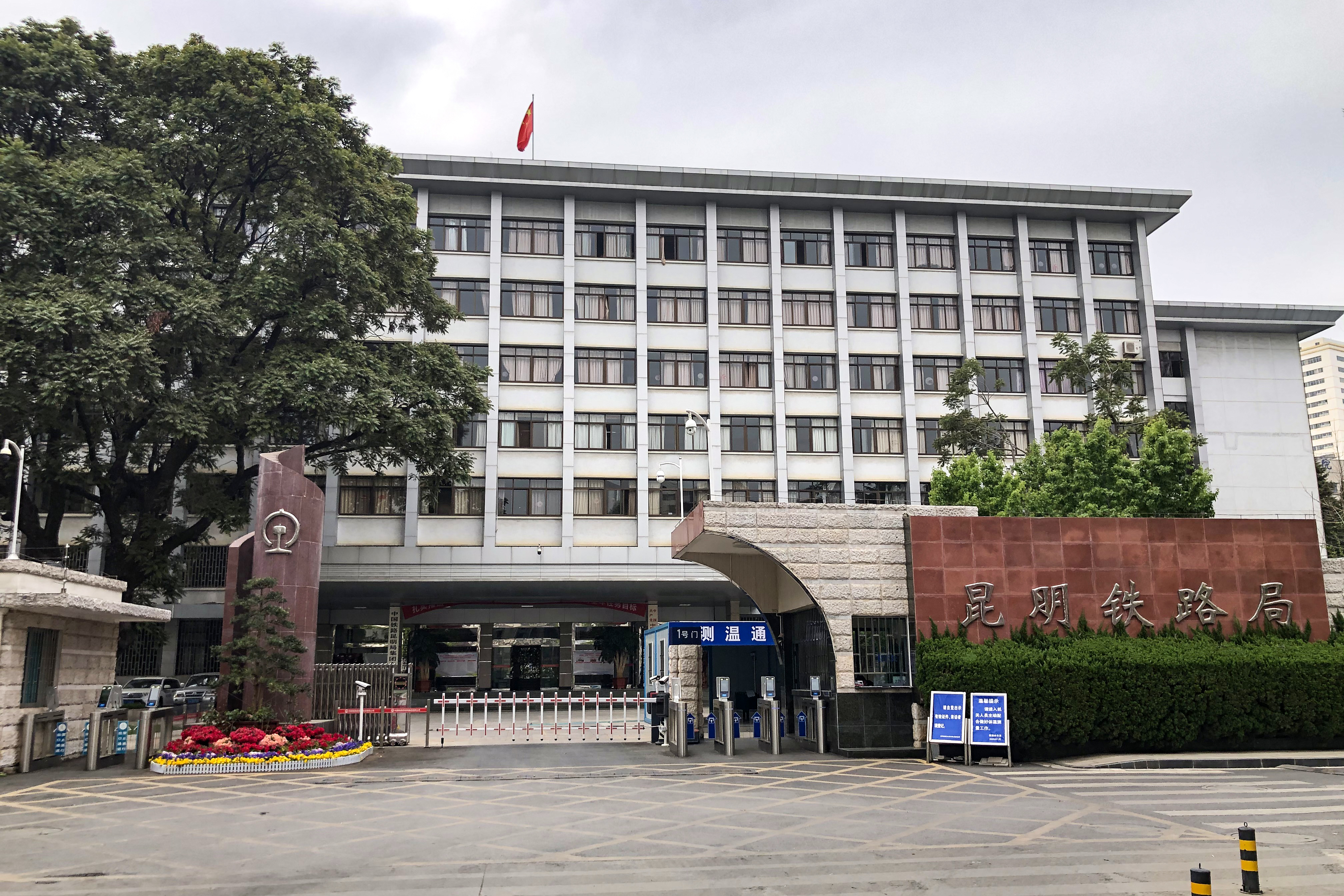
- Headquarters of CR Kunming Group
- Company type: state-owned enterprise
- Industry: Railway operations
- Predecessor: Kunming Railway Administration
- Founded: 19 November 2017
- Headquarters: 548 Tangshuang Road, Guandu, Kunming, Yunnan, China
- Area served: Yunnan, Laos
- Owner: Government of China
- Parent: China Railway
- Website: Official Weibo Website

China Railway Kunming Group
- Simplified Chinese: 中国铁路昆明局集团
- Traditional Chinese: 中國鐵路昆明局集團
Transcriptions
Standard Mandarin
- Hanyu Pinyin: Zhōngguó Tiělù Kūnmíng Jú Jítuán
- Wade–Giles: Chung-kuo Tʻieh-lu Kʻun-ming Chü Chi-tʻuan

Kunming Railway Administration
- Simplified Chinese: 昆明铁路局
- Traditional Chinese: 昆明鐵路局
Transcriptions
Standard Mandarin
- Hanyu Pinyin: Kūnmíng Tiělù Jú
- Wade–Giles: Kʻun-ming Tʻieh-lu Chü

CR Kunming
- Simplified Chinese: 昆铁
- Traditional Chinese: 昆鐵
Transcriptions
Standard Mandarin
- Hanyu Pinyin: Kūntiě
- Wade–Giles: Kʻun-tʻieh

China Railway Kunming Group, officially abbreviated as CR Kunming or CR-Kunming, formerly, Kunming Railway Administration is a subsidiary company under the jurisdiction of the corporatized China Railway (formerly the Ministry of Railway). The railway administration was reorganized as a company in November 2017.

It is responsible for the railway network within Yunnan.

== Hub stations ==
=== China section ===
- Kunming
  - Kunming, Kunming East, Kunming South
- Yuxi
  - Yuxi
- Mohan
  - Mohan
- Hekou
  - Hekou North

=== Laos section ===
- Luang Namtha
  - Boten, Na Teuy
- Oudomxay
  - Muang Xay
- Luang Prabang
  - Luang Prabang
- Vientiane
  - Vang Vieng
- Vientiane Prefecture
  - Vientiane
