= Vanh Dai 3 station =

Metro station in Hanoi, Vietnam

Coordinates: 20°59′32″N 105°48′16″E

Vanh Dai 3 Vành Đai 3
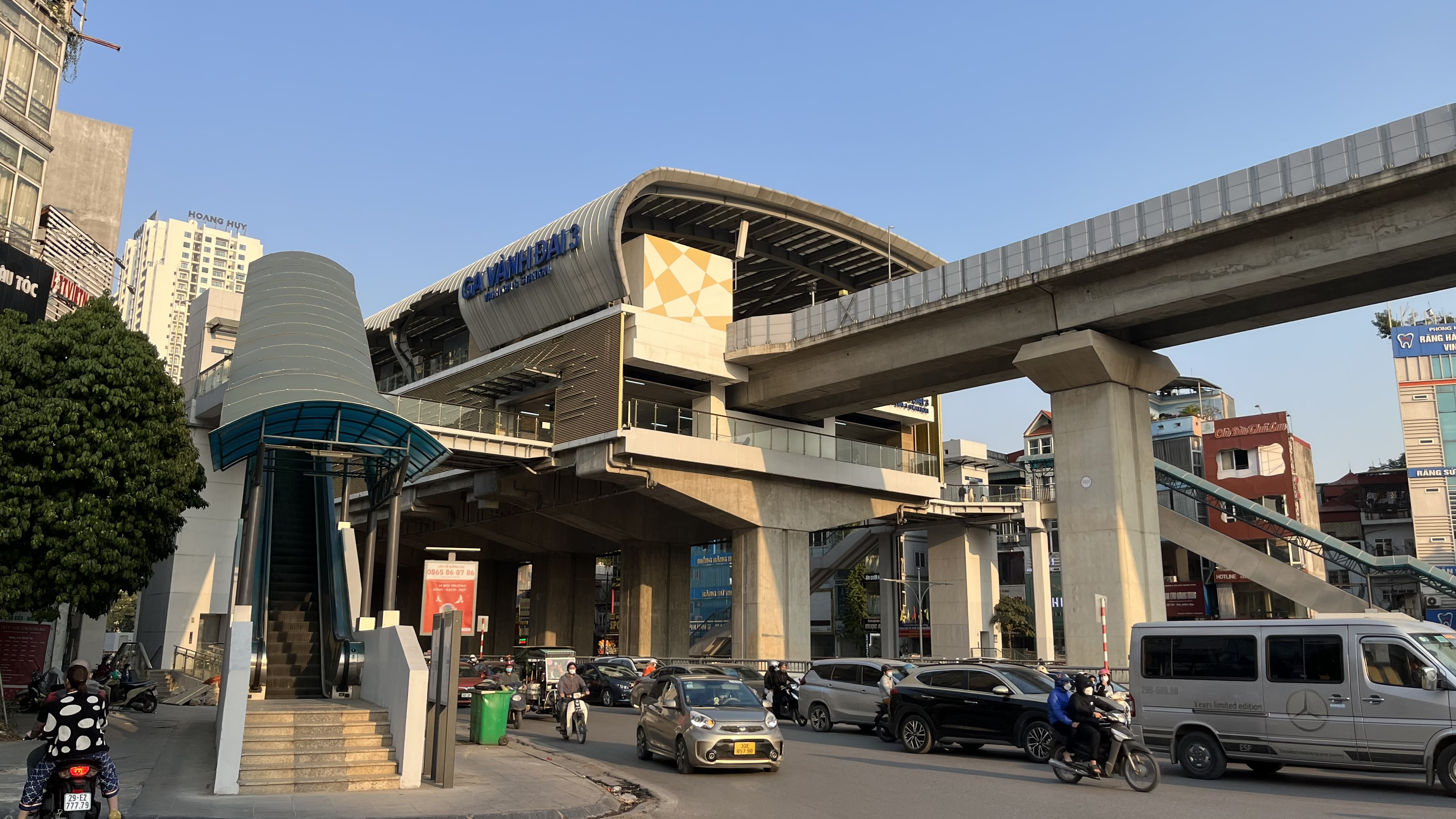
- Vanh Dai 3 station

General information
- Location: Thanh Xuân & Khương Đình wards, Hanoi, Vietnam
- System: T2AC06
- Owner: Vietnam Railways
- Operator: Hanoi Metro
- Line: Line 2A (Hanoi Metro)
- Platforms: 2
- Tracks: 2

Construction
- Structure type: Elevated
- Accessible: Yes

History
- Opened: 6 November 2021; 4 years ago

Services
| Preceding station | Hanoi Metro | Following station |
|---|---|---|
| Thuong Dinh T2AC05 towards Cat Linh | Line 2A | Phung Khoang T2AC07 towards Yen Nghia |
Route map
Location

Vanh Dai 3 station (Vietnamese: Ga Vành Đai 3) (Note: 3 is read as "ba" in Vietnamese) is a metro station located between Thanh Xuân and Khương Đình wards in Hanoi.

The station name literally means "Ring Road 3" because it is next to the Ring Road No. 3 (Ringway 3, Vietnamese: Đường Vành đai 3) of Hanoi.

== Station layout ==
=== Line 2A ===
2F; Platform
| 2F; Platform | Side platform, doors will open on the right |
| 2F; Platform | Platform | ← T2A Line 2A to Thuong Dinh (for Cat Linh) |
| 2F; Platform | Platform | T2A Line 2A to Phung Khoang (for Yen Nghia) → |
| 2F; Platform | Side platform, doors will open on the right |
| 1F; Concourse | 1st Floor | Ticket sales area, commercial area, technical area, platform entrances and ticket gate |
| G | Ground Floor | Entrances |
