= La Khe station =

Metro station in Hanoi

Coordinates: 20°57′50″N 105°46′0″E

La Khe La Khê
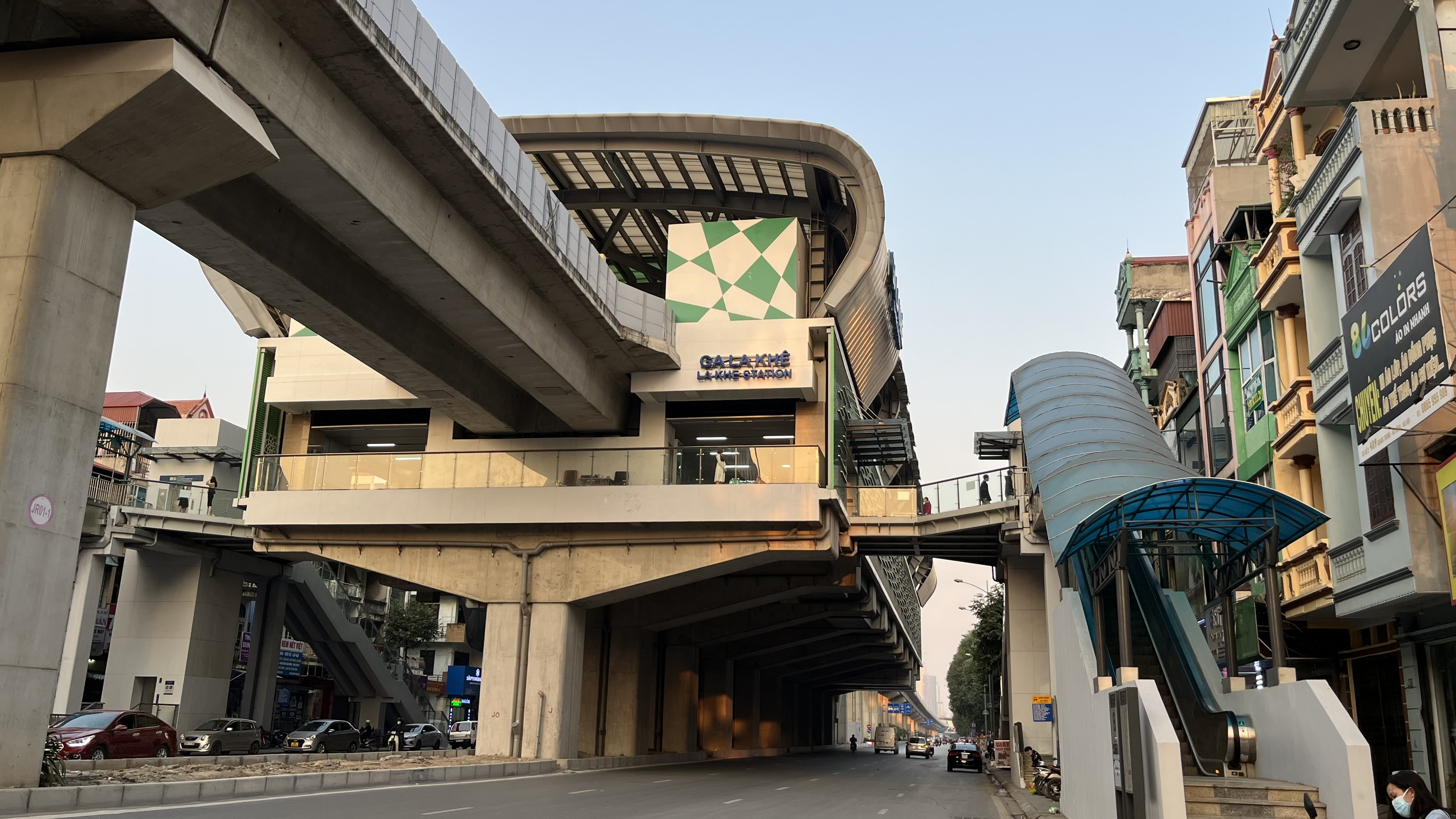
- La Khe station

General information
- Location: Hà Đông, Hanoi, Vietnam
- System: T2AC10
- Owner: Vietnam Railways
- Operator: Hanoi Metro
- Line: Line 2A
- Platforms: 2
- Tracks: 2

Construction
- Structure type: Elevated
- Accessible: Yes

History
- Opened: 6 November 2021; 4 years ago

Services
Preceding station	Hanoi Metro	Following station
Ha Dong T2AC09 towards Cat Linh	Line 2A	Van Khe T2AC11 towards Yen Nghia
Route map
Location

La Khe station (Vietnamese: Ga La Khê) is a metro station in Hanoi, located in Hà Đông, Hanoi.

== Station layout ==
=== Line 2A ===
2F; Platform
2F; Platform	Side platform, doors will open on the right
2F; Platform	Platform	← T2A Line 2A to Ha Dong (for Cat Linh)
2F; Platform	Platform	T2A Line 2A to Van Khe (for Yen Nghia) →
2F; Platform	Side platform, doors will open on the right
1F; Concourse	1st Floor	Ticket sales area, commercial area, technical area, platform entrances and ticket gate
G	Ground Floor	Entrances
