= Thuong Dinh station =

Metro station in Hanoi, Vietnam

Coordinates: 20°59′51″N 105°48′44″E

Thuong Dinh Thượng Đình
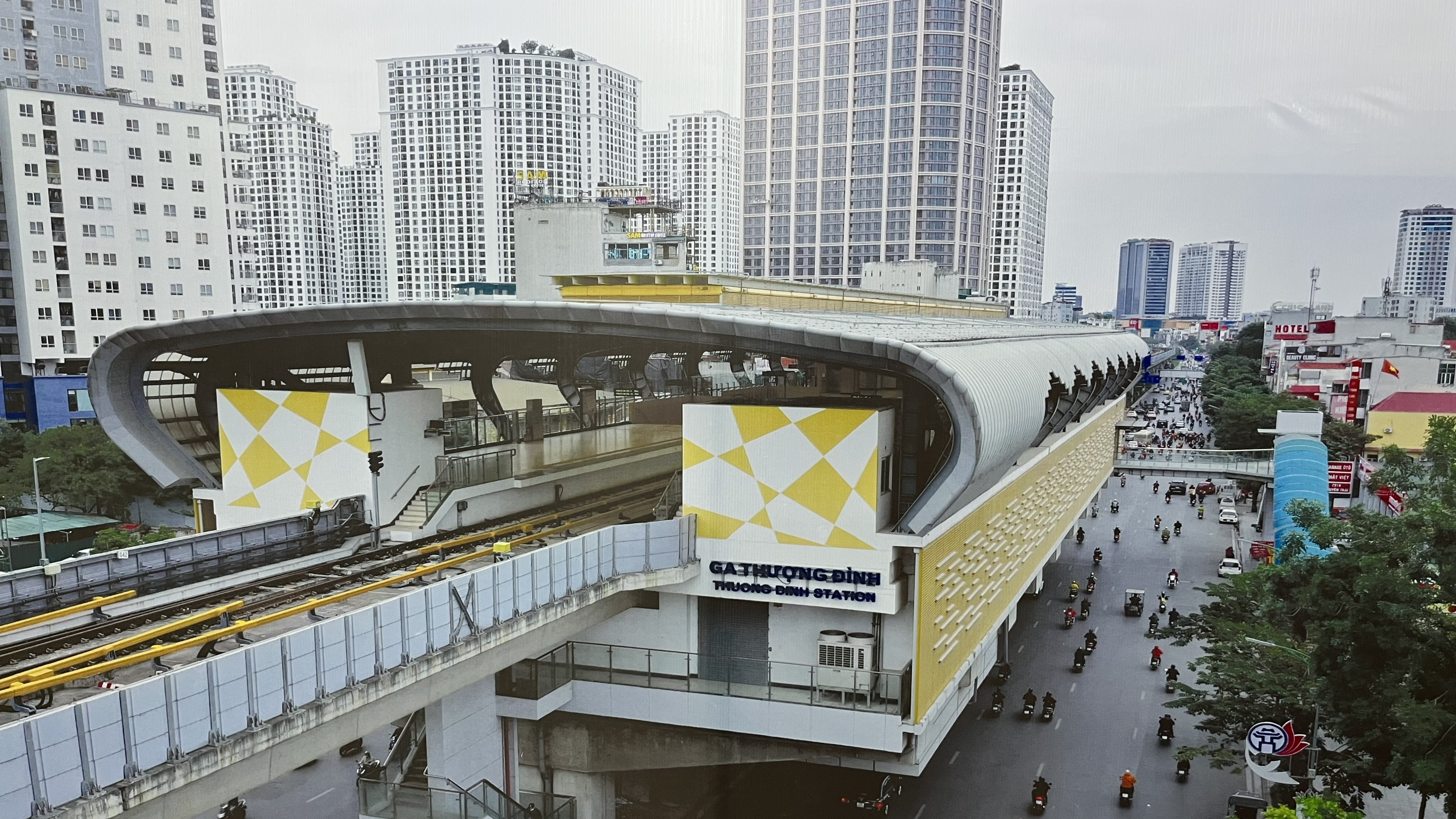

General information
- Location: Thanh Xuân, Hanoi, Vietnam
- System: T2AC05
- Owner: Vietnam Railways
- Operator: Hanoi Metro
- Lines: (phase 2)
- Platforms: ● Line 2A: 2 side platforms
- Tracks: 2

Construction
- Structure type: ● Line 2A: Elevated (2F)
- Accessible: Yes

History
- Opened: 6 November 2021; 4 years ago

Services
Preceding station	Hanoi Metro	Following station
Lang T2AC04 towards Cat Linh	Line 2A	Vanh Dai 3 T2AC06 towards Yen Nghia
Route map
Location

Thuong Dinh station (Vietnamese: Ga Thượng Đình) is a metro station in Hanoi, located in Thanh Xuân, Hanoi.

== Station layout ==
=== Line 2A ===
2F; Platform
2F; Platform	Side platform, doors will open on the right
2F; Platform	Platform	← T2A Line 2A to Lang (for Cat Linh)
2F; Platform	Platform	T2A Line 2A to Vanh Dai 3 (for Yen Nghia) →
2F; Platform	Side platform, doors will open on the right
1F; Concourse	1st Floor	Ticket sales area, commercial area, technical area, platform entrances and ticket gate
G	Ground Floor	Entrances

=== Line 2 ===
...
