= Thai Ha station =

Metro station in Hanoi, Vietnam

Thai Ha Thái Hà
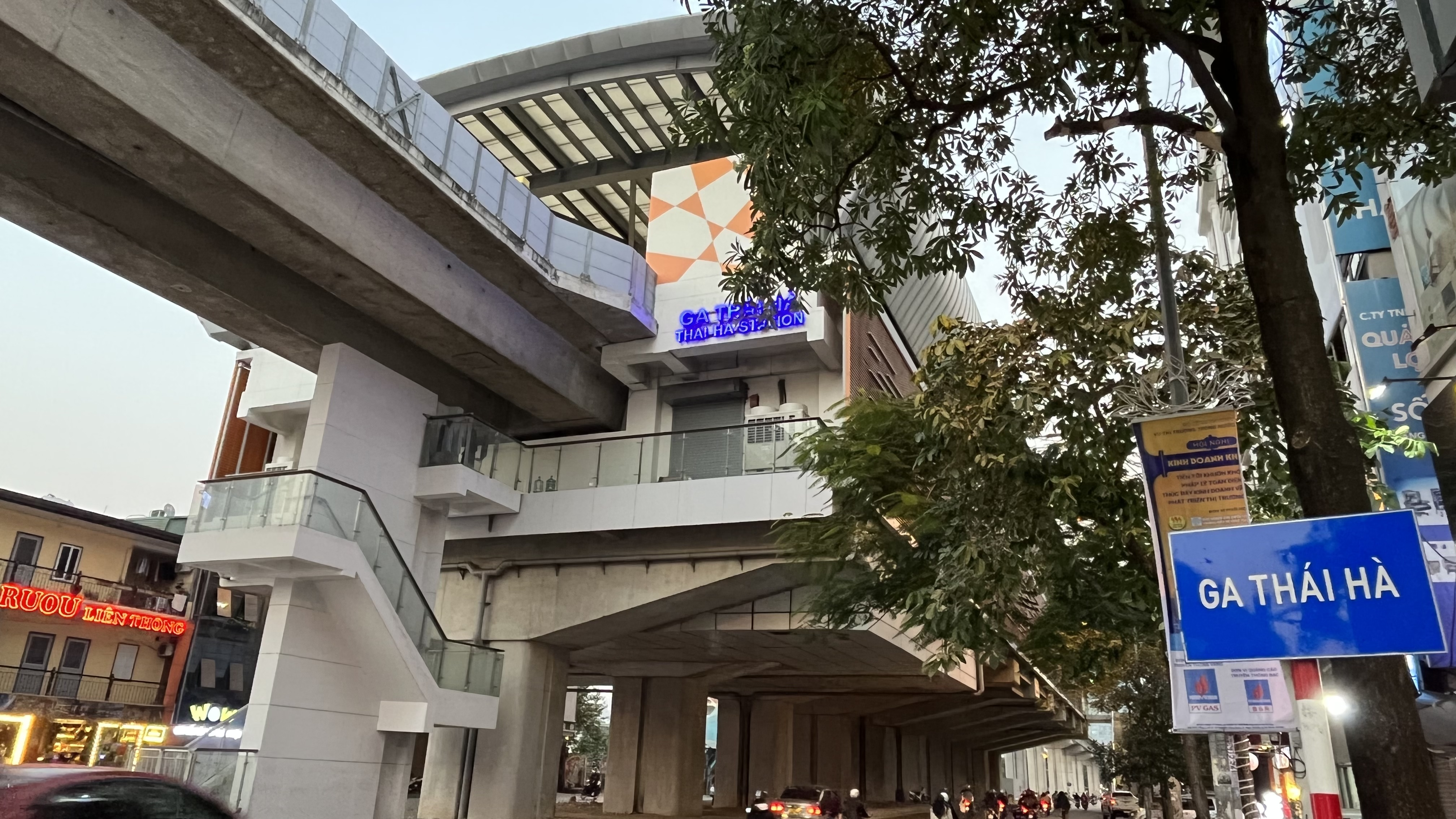

General information
- Location: Đống Đa, Hanoi, Vietnam
- Coordinates: 21°0′52″N 105°49′10″E
- System: T2AC03
- Owner: Vietnam Railways
- Operator: Hanoi Metro
- Line: Line 2A (Hanoi Metro)
- Platforms: 2 side platforms
- Tracks: 2
- Bus routes: 12, 26, 30(CT), 35A, 50, 84, 144, E03

Construction
- Structure type: Elevated (2F)
- Accessible: Yes

History
- Opened: 6 November 2021; 4 years ago

Services
Preceding station	Hanoi Metro	Following station
La Thanh T2AC02 towards Cat Linh	Line 2A	Lang T2AC04 towards Yen Nghia
Route map
Location

Thai Ha station (Vietnamese: Ga Thái Hà) is a metro station in Hanoi, located in Đống Đa, Hanoi.

== Station layout ==
=== Line 2A ===
2F; Platform
2F; Platform	Side platform, doors will open on the right
2F; Platform	Platform	← T2A Line 2A to La Thanh (for Cat Linh)
2F; Platform	Platform	T2A Line 2A to Lang (for Yen Nghia) →
2F; Platform	Side platform, doors will open on the right
1F; Concourse	1st Floor	Ticket sales area, commercial area, technical area, platform entrances and ticket gate
G	Ground Floor	Entrances
