= Ha Dong station =

Metro station in Hanoi, Vietnam

Ha Dong Hà Đông
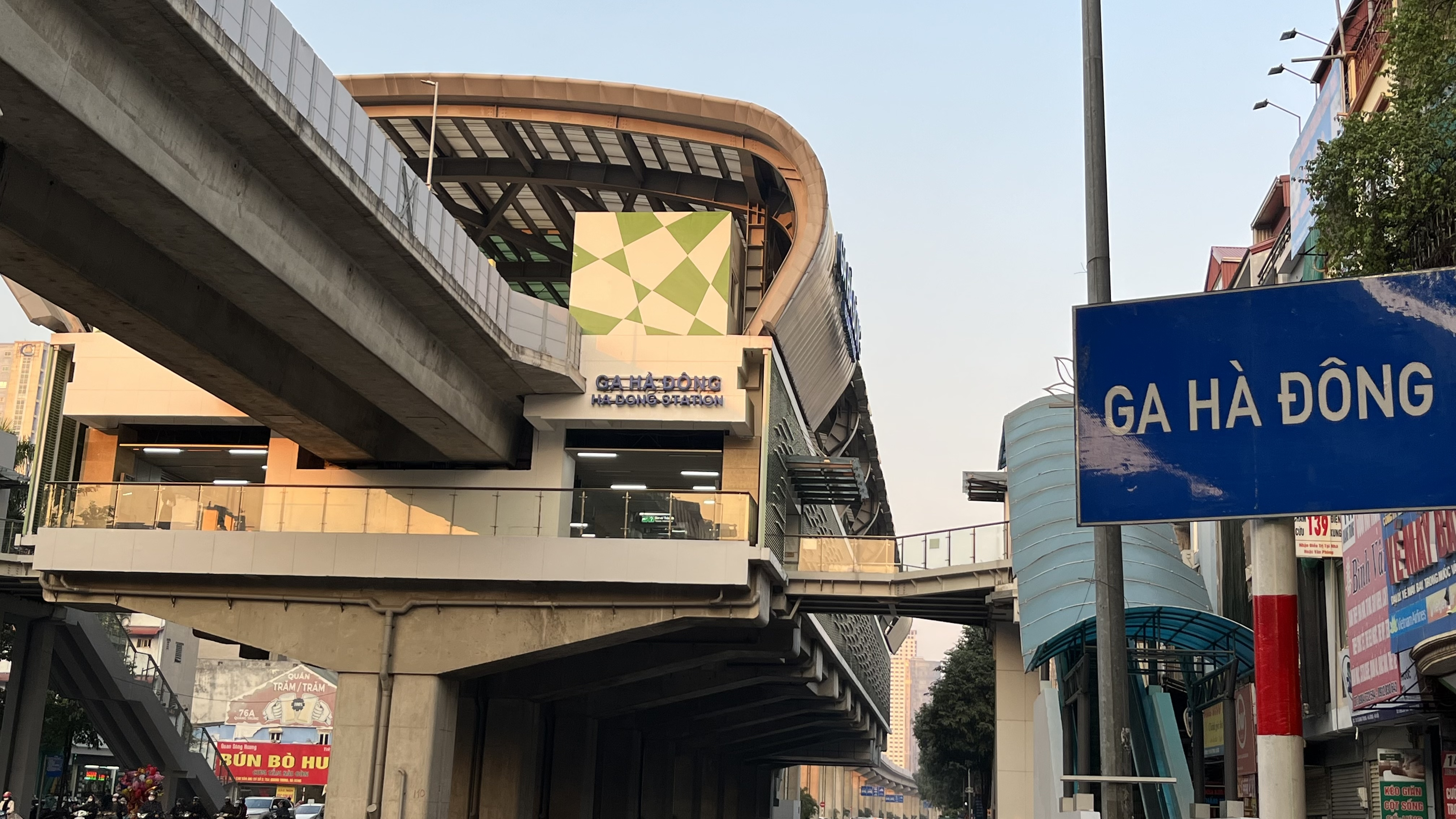

General information
- Location: Hà Đông Ward, Hanoi, Vietnam
- Coordinates: 20°58′13″N 105°46′30″E
- System: T2AC09
- Owner: Vietnam Railways
- Operator: Hanoi Metro
- Line: Line 2A
- Platforms: 2
- Tracks: 2

Construction
- Structure type: Elevated
- Accessible: Yes

History
- Opened: 6 November 2021; 4 years ago

Services
Preceding station	Hanoi Metro	Following station
Van Quan T2AC08 towards Cat Linh	Line 2A	La Khe T2AC10 towards Yen Nghia
Route map
Location

Ha Dong station (Vietnamese: Ga Hà Đông) is a metro station in Hanoi, located in Hà Đông, Hanoi.

== Station layout ==
=== Line 2A ===
2F; Platform
2F; Platform	Side platform, doors will open on the right
2F; Platform	Platform	← T2A Line 2A to Van Quan (for Cat Linh)
2F; Platform	Platform	T2A Line 2A to La Khe (for Yen Nghia) →
2F; Platform	Side platform, doors will open on the right
1F; Concourse	1st Floor	Ticket sales area, commercial area, technical area, platform entrances and ticket gate
G	Ground Floor	Entrances
