= La Thanh station =

Metro station in Hanoi, Vietnam

La Thanh La Thành
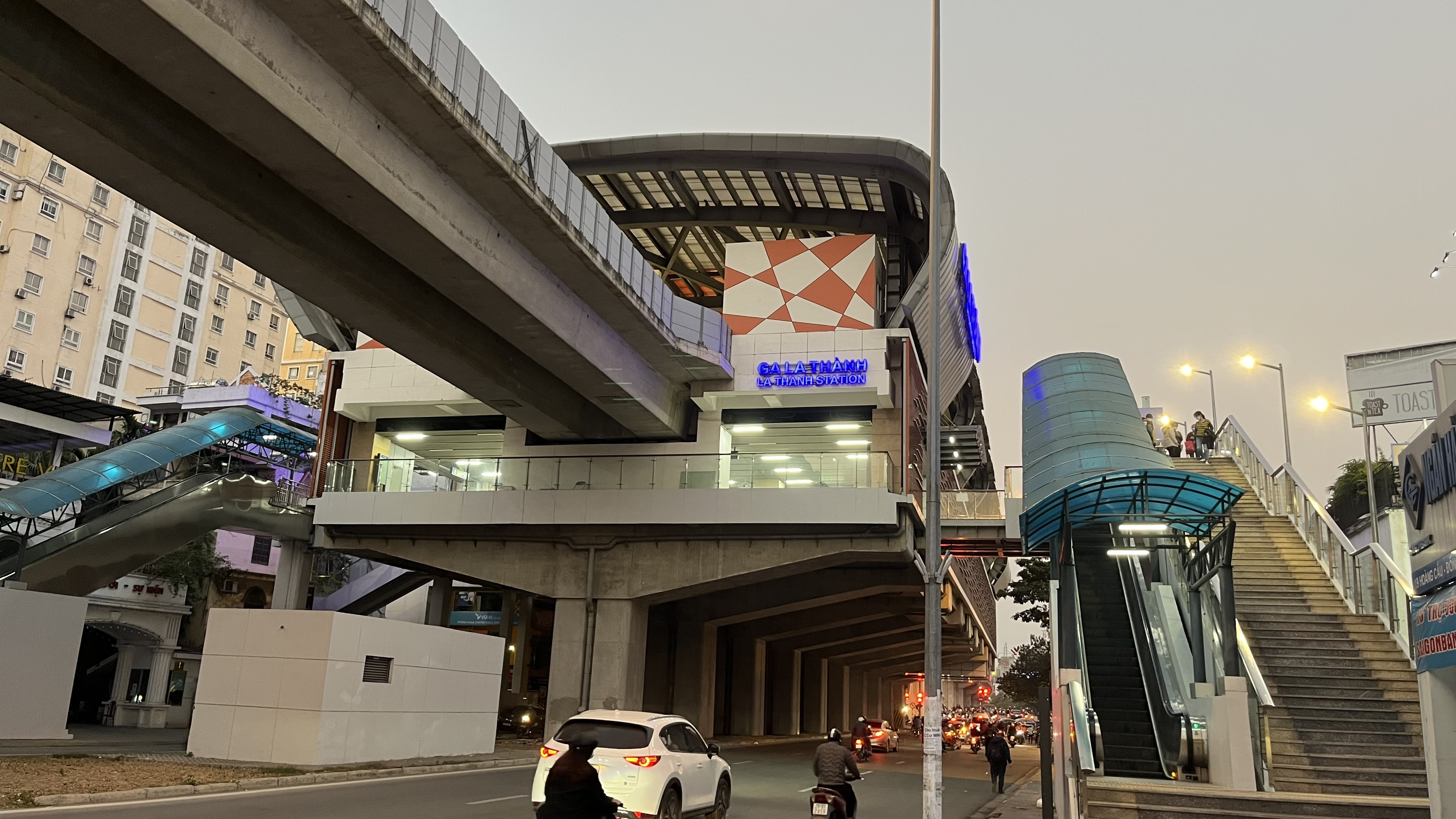

General information
- Location: Hoàng Cầu street, Ô Chợ Dừa ward, Hanoi, Vietnam
- Coordinates: 21°1′13″N 105°49′31″E
- System: T2AC02
- Owner: Vietnam Railways
- Operator: Hanoi Metro
- Line: Line 2A (Hanoi Metro)
- Platforms: 2 side platforms
- Tracks: 2
- Bus routes: 23, 25, 28, 30(CT), 49, 50, 99, 142, 144

Construction
- Structure type: Elevated (2F)
- Accessible: Yes

History
- Opened: 6 November 2021; 4 years ago

Services
| Preceding station | Hanoi Metro | Following station |
|---|---|---|
| Cat Linh T2AC01 Terminus | Line 2A | Thai Ha T2AC03 towards Yen Nghia |
Route map
Location

La Thanh station (Vietnamese: Ga La Thành) is a metro station in Hanoi, located in Đống Đa, Hanoi.

== Station layout ==
=== Line 2A ===
2F; Platform
| 2F; Platform | Side platform, doors will open on the right |
| 2F; Platform | Platform | ← T2A Line 2A to Cat Linh (Terminus) Transfer to T3 Line 3 on the next station |
| 2F; Platform | Platform | T2A Line 2A to Thai Ha (for Yen Nghia) → |
| 2F; Platform | Side platform, doors will open on the right |
| 1F; Concourse | 1st Floor | Ticket sales area, commercial area, technical area, platform entrances and ticket gate |
| G | Ground Floor | Entrances |
