= Lang station (Hanoi) =

Metro station in Hanoi, Vietnam

Coordinates: 21°0′22″N 105°48′58″E

Lang Láng
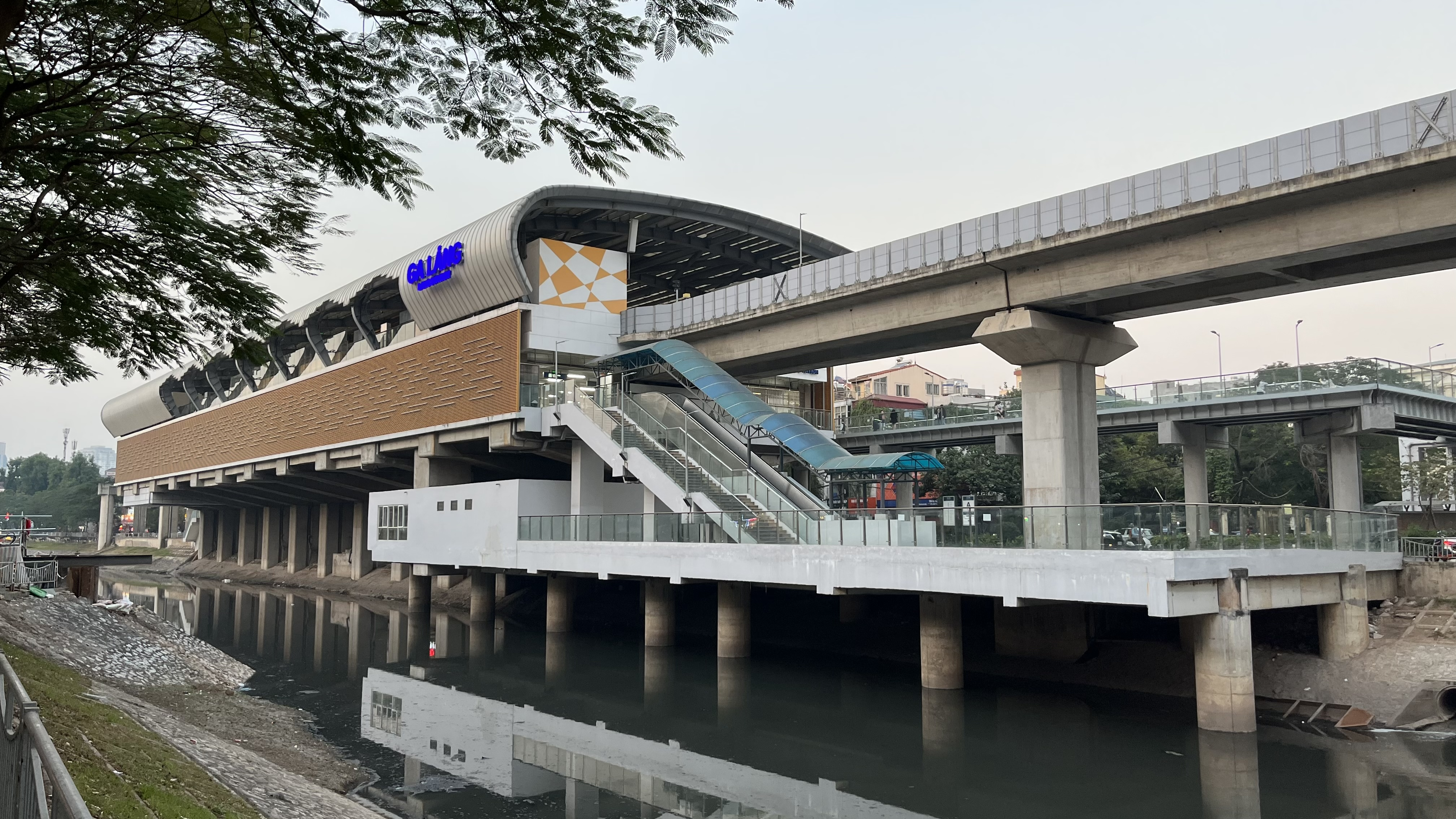

General information
- Location: Láng Ward, urban Hanoi, Vietnam
- System: T2AC04
- Owner: Vietnam Railways
- Operator: Hanoi Metro
- Line: Line 2A (Hanoi Metro)
- Platforms: 2 side platforms
- Tracks: 2

Construction
- Structure type: Elevated (2F)
- Accessible: Yes

History
- Opened: 6 November 2021; 4 years ago

Services
Preceding station	Hanoi Metro	Following station
Thai Ha T2AC03 towards Cat Linh	Line 2A	Thuong Dinh T2AC05 towards Yen Nghia
Route map
Location

Lang station (Vietnamese: Ga Láng) is a metro station in Hanoi, located in Láng Ward, Hanoi.

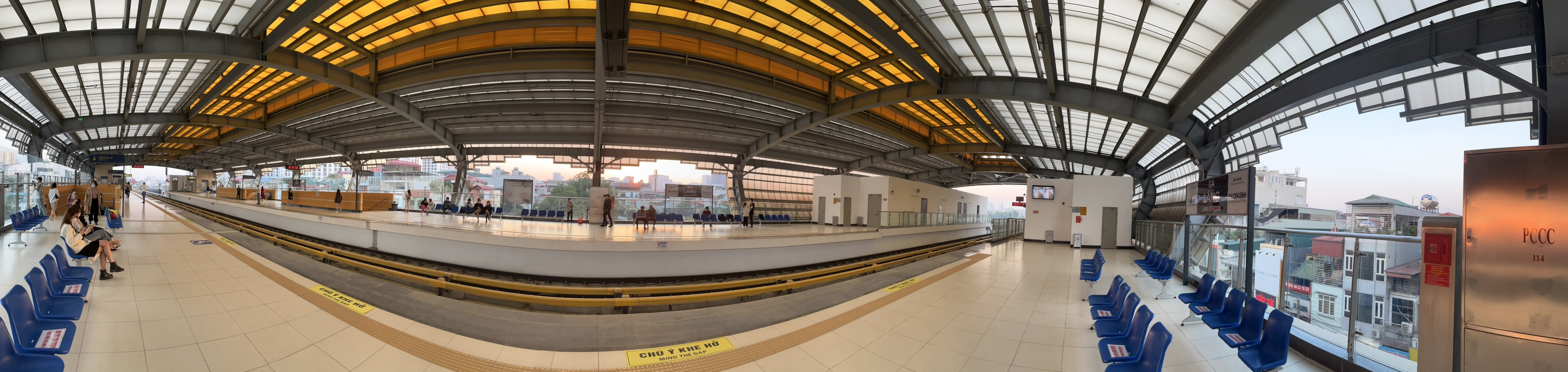
Panoramic view on platform of Láng station.

== Station layout ==
=== Line 2A ===
2F; Platform
2F; Platform	Side platform, doors will open on the right
2F; Platform	Platform	← T2A Line 2A to Thai Ha (for Cat Linh)
2F; Platform	Platform	T2A Line 2A to Thuong Dinh (for Yen Nghia) →
2F; Platform	Side platform, doors will open on the right
1F; Concourse	1st Floor	Ticket sales area, commercial area, technical area, platform entrances and ticket gate
G	Ground Floor	Entrances
