= Line 2A (Hanoi Metro) =

Metro line in Hanoi, Vietnam

- Line 2A (Hanoi Metro)
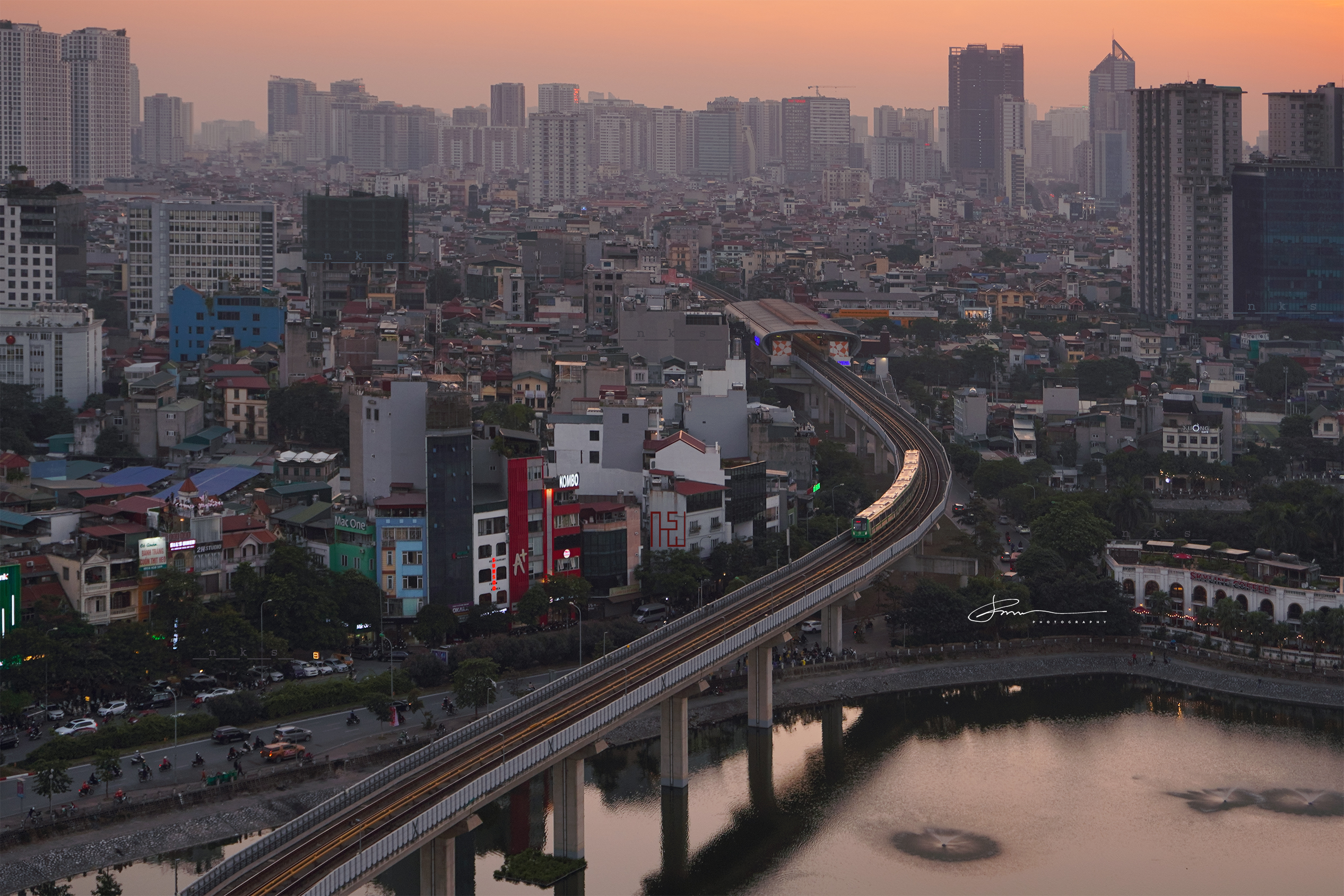
- Line 2A train passing through Hoàng Cầu Lake

Overview
- Native name: Tuyến 2A
- Owner: Hanoi People's Committee
- Line number: 2A
- Termini: Cat Linh; Yen Nghia
- Stations: 12
- Website: hanoimetro.net.vn

Service
- Type: Rapid transit
- System: Hanoi Metro
- Operator: Hanoi Metro Company (HMC)
- Depot: Phú Lương Depot
- Rolling stock: 13 4-carriage trains (52 carriages); 79 m long, 3.8 m high, 2.8 m wide
- Ridership: 10.7 million (2023)

History
- Opened: 6 November 2021; 4 years ago

Technical
- Line length: 13.1 km (8.1 mi)
- Num of tracks: 2
- Track gauge: 1,435 mm (4 ft 8 1/2 in) standard gauge
- Electrification: Third rail 750 V DC
- Operating speed: 35 km/h (22 mph); 80 km/h (50 mph) (maximum)

Line 2A of the Hanoi Metro (Vietnamese: Tuyến đường sắt đô thị số 2A Hà Nội) is a rapid transit line in Hanoi, Vietnam. It is the first rapid transit line to operate in Vietnam and was opened for service on 6 November 2021.

The 12-station line starts at Cat Linh in Đống Đa district, passes through Thuong Dinh in Thanh Xuân district and ends at Yen Nghia in Hà Đông district.

== History ==
Construction of the 13.1 km (8.1 mi) line started in October 2011 and was initially scheduled to be completed by 2016. The completion has been delayed due to several hurdles including finalizing funding from the government of China. The original cost estimate of $552.86 million has also ballooned to more than $868 million. Most of the funding for the project is financed by preferential loans from the Export Import Bank of China. The rest of funding is from the Vietnamese government.

On the afternoon of 25 April 2017, Shenzhen Metro Group and China Railway officially signed the "Cooperation Agreement for the Cat Linh-Ha Dong Line of the Hanoi Urban Rail Transit Project in Vietnam". Total investment is 89.04 million RMB, with a contract period of 16 months. This is second project outside Mainland China of Shenzhen Metro Group to be officially launched.

The line was constructed by China Railway Engineering Corporation. The bulk of the construction was completed by the fourth quarter of 2018. Operational tests were conducted at the end of 2018 and again in 2019. After delays, Line 2A eventually opened to the public on 6 November 2021.

== Route ==
Route of the Hanoi Metro Line 2A

== Stations ==
The stations are built and designed with the concept of station variety. Each station has a distinct color. For example, La Khe station has a light green theme. All stations have curvy roofs, suitable for the hot, humid and rainy climate of Vietnam and consistent with Southeast Asian architecture. The roofs are covered with light-absorbing, wind-protection and radiation-proof materials. Some stations, such as Cat Linh station, are designed with modern and neighborhood-multifunctional styles.

Stations are equipped with facilities such as lifts, escalators, stairways, security cameras, wheelchair accessibility, automatic fare collection systems, and ventilation systems. Emergency exits are designed according to international standards to ensure maximum safety for passengers.

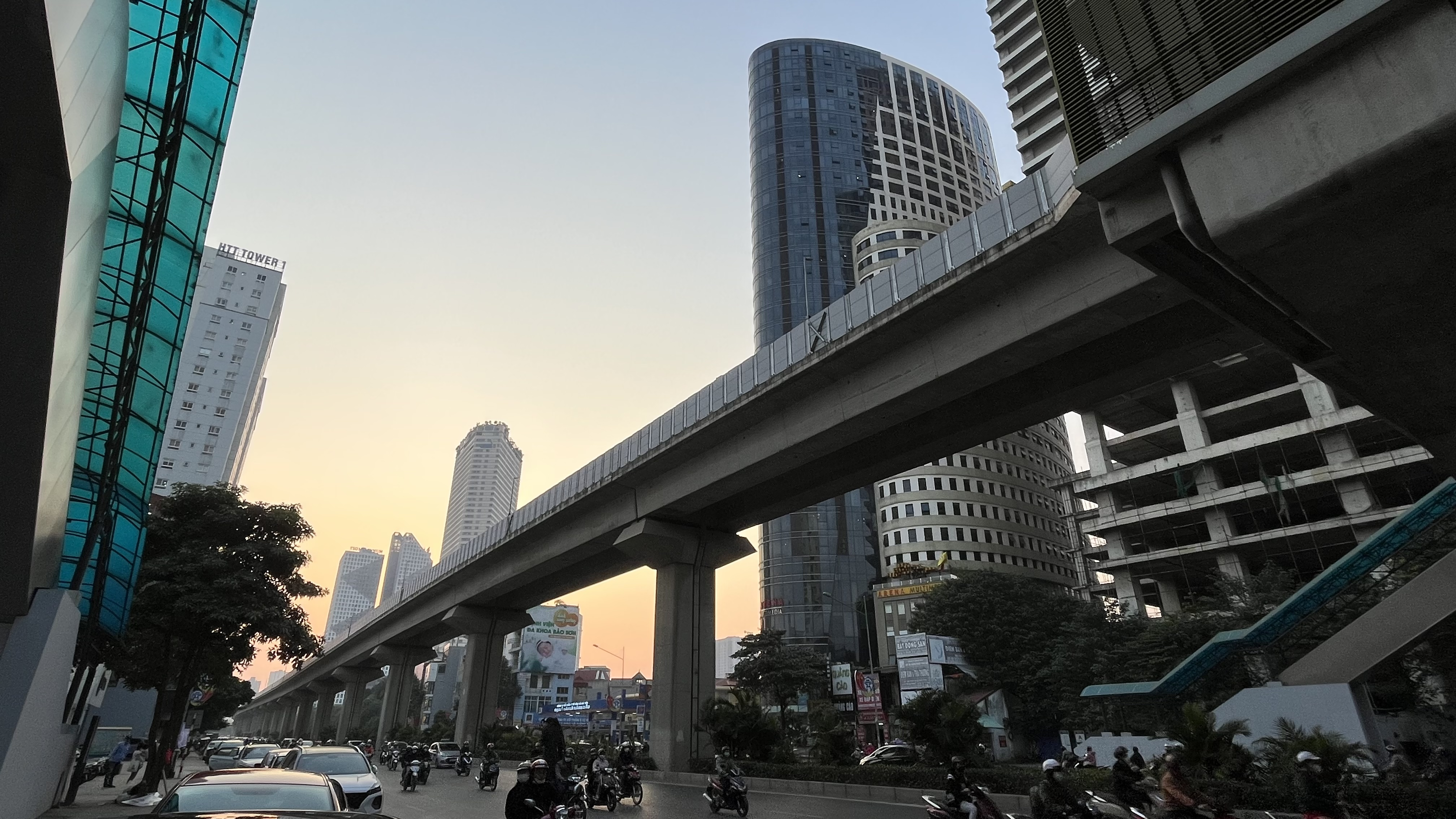
Line 2A of Hanoi Metro over Tran Phu street, near Van Quan station

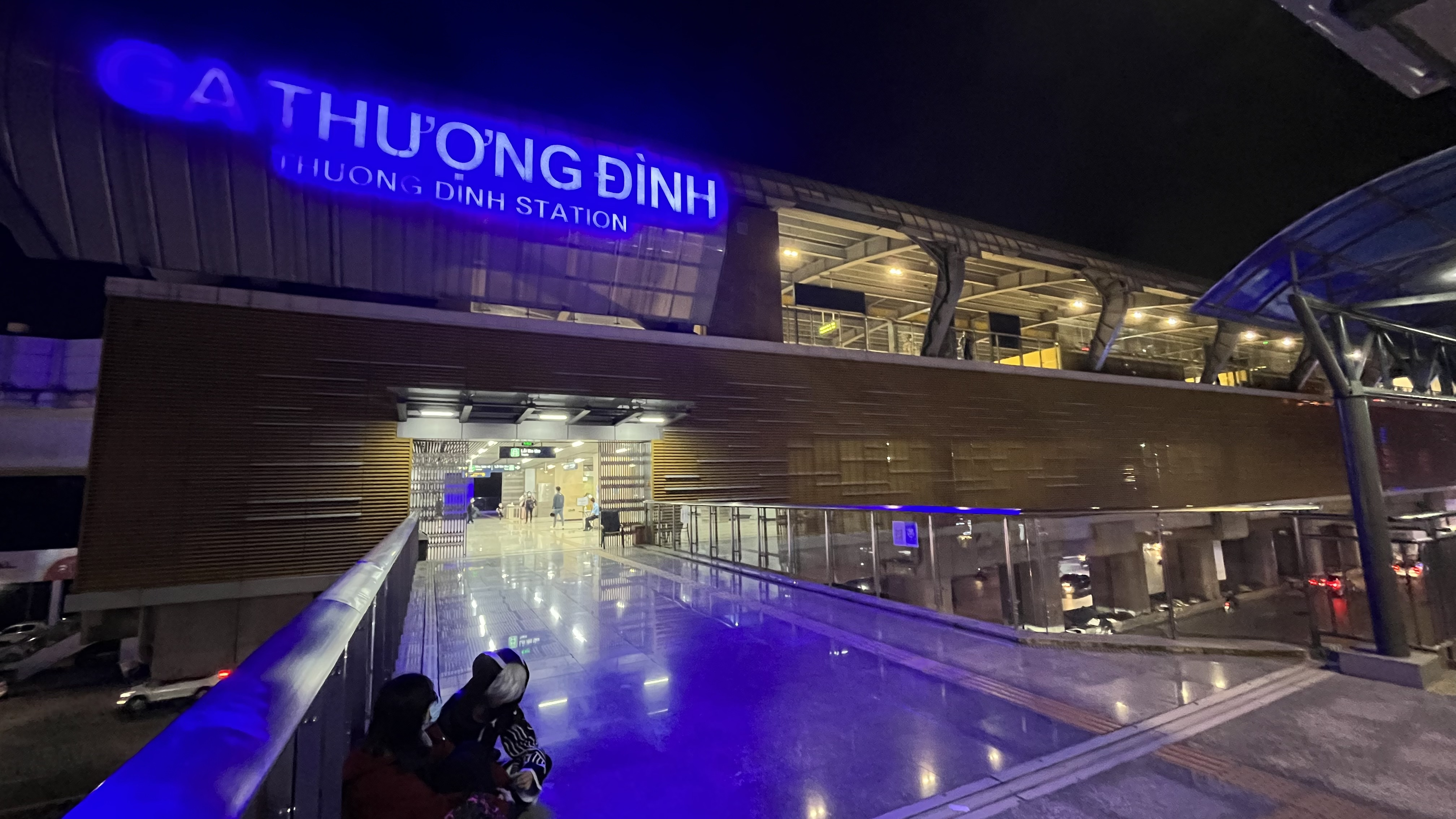
Thuong Dinh station at night

=== Phase 1 stations ===
Station symbol	Station name		Rapid transit transfers	Distance between stations	Total distance	Location	
Station symbol	English	Vietnamese	Rapid transit transfers	Distance between stations	Total distance	District	Ward
T2AC01	Cat Linh	Cát Linh	Line 3 (Hanoi Metro)	0 km (0 mi)	0 km (0 mi)	Đống Đa	Cát Linh
T2AC02	La Thanh	La Thành		0.9 km (0.56 mi)	0.9 km (0.56 mi)	Đống Đa	Ô Chợ Dừa
T2AC03	Thai Ha	Thái Hà		0.9 km (0.56 mi)	1.8 km (1.12 mi)	Đống Đa	Trung Liệt
T2AC04	Lang	Láng		1.0 km (0.62 mi)	2.8 km (1.74 mi)	Đống Đa	Thịnh Quang
T2AC05	Thuong Dinh	Thượng Đình	(planned)	1.2 km (0.75 mi)	4.0 km (2.49 mi)	Thanh Xuân	Thượng Đình
T2AC06	Vanh Dai 3	Vành Đai 3	(planned)	1.0 km (0.62 mi)	5.0 km (3.11 mi)	Thanh Xuân	Thanh Xuân Trung
T2AC07	Phung Khoang	Phùng Khoang		1.4 km (0.87 mi)	6.4 km (3.98 mi)	Hà Đông	Mộ Lao
T2AC08	Van Quan	Văn Quán		1.1 km (0.68 mi)	7.5 km (4.66 mi)	Hà Đông	Văn Quán
T2AC09	Ha Dong	Hà Đông		1.3 km (0.81 mi)	8.8 km (5.47 mi)	Hà Đông	Quang Trung
T2AC10	La Khe	La Khê	(planned); BRT01	1.1 km (0.68 mi)	9.9 km (6.15 mi)	Hà Đông	Phú La
T2AC11	Van Khe	Văn Khê	(planned); BRT01	1.1 km (0.68 mi)	11.3 km (7.02 mi)	Hà Đông	La Khê
T2AC12	Yen Nghia	Yên Nghĩa	BRT01	1.0 km (0.62 mi)	12.3 km (7.64 mi)	Hà Đông	Yên Nghĩa

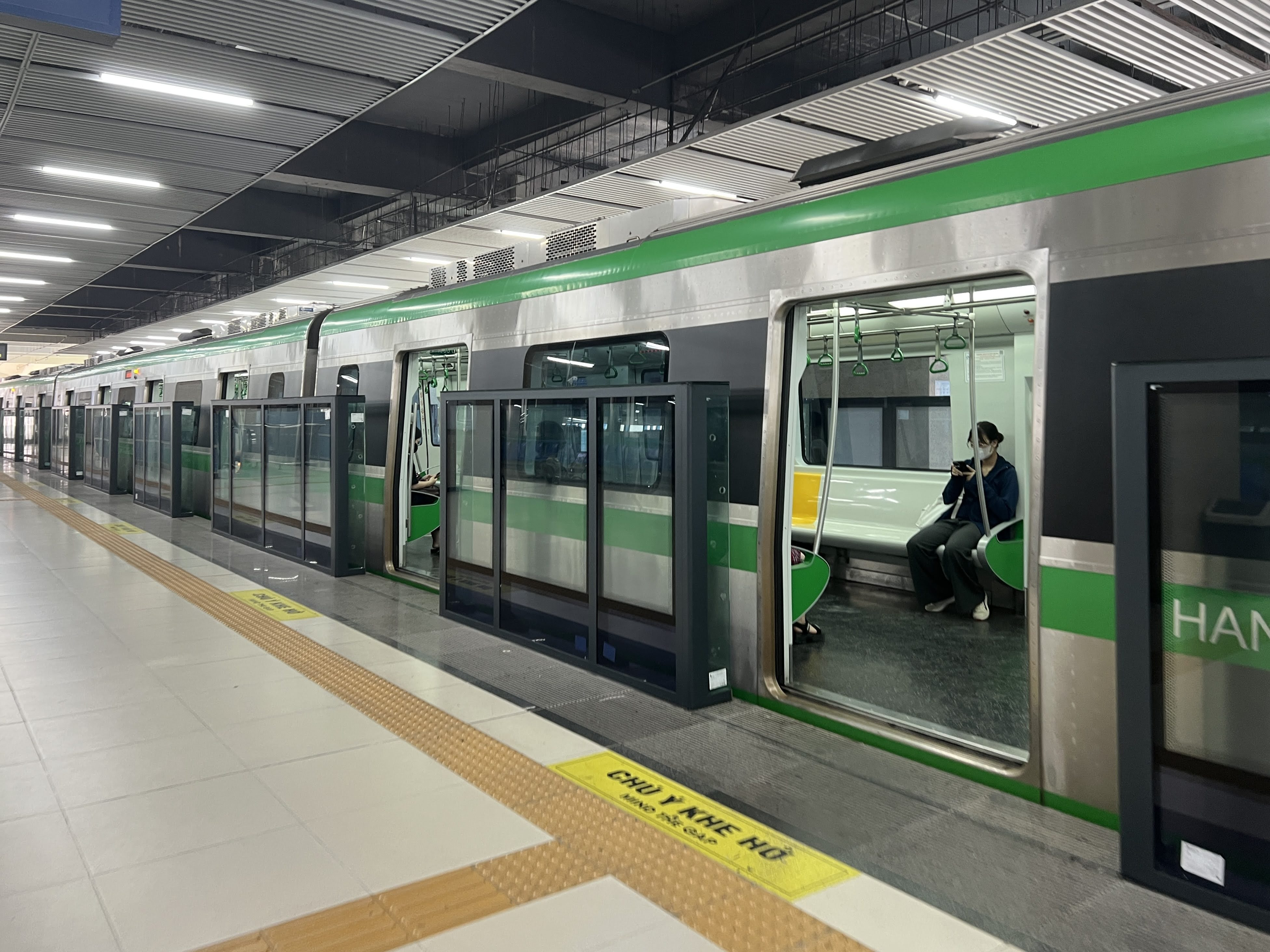
Cat Linh station with train

=== Phase 2 stations ===
The extended section to Xuân Mai will be 20.4 kilometres (12.68 mi) long with 12 stations, each station being 1.8 km (1.1 mi) apart on average.

Station symbol	Station name		Rapid transit transfers	Distance between stations	Total distance	Location	
Station symbol	English	Vietnamese	Rapid transit transfers	Distance between stations	Total distance	District	Ward
T2AC13	Do La	Đô La		average of 1.8 km (1.1 mi)	—N/a	—	
T2AC14	Mai Linh	Mai Lĩnh		average of 1.8 km (1.1 mi)	—N/a	—	
T2AC15	Bien Giang	Biên Giang		average of 1.8 km (1.1 mi)	—N/a	—	
T2AC16	Ngoc Hoa	Ngọc Hòa		average of 1.8 km (1.1 mi)	—N/a	—	
T2AC17	Phu Nghia	Phú Nghĩa		average of 1.8 km (1.1 mi)	—N/a	—	
T2AC18	Truong Yen	Trường Yên		average of 1.8 km (1.1 mi)	—N/a	—	
T2AC19	West Phuong Yen	Đông Phương Yên		average of 1.8 km (1.1 mi)	—N/a	—	
T2AC20	South Dong Son	Nam Đông Sơn		average of 1.8 km (1.1 mi)	—N/a	—	
T2AC21	Tien Truong	Tiên Trượng		average of 1.8 km (1.1 mi)	—N/a	—	
T2AC22	Xuan Mai East	Xuân Mai Đông		average of 1.8 km (1.1 mi)	—N/a	—	
T2AC23	Xuan Mai	Xuân Mai		average of 1.8 km (1.1 mi)	—N/a	—	
T2AC24	Xuan Mai West	Xuân Mai Tây		average of 1.8 km (1.1 mi)	32.7 km (20.32 mi)	—	

== Rolling stock ==
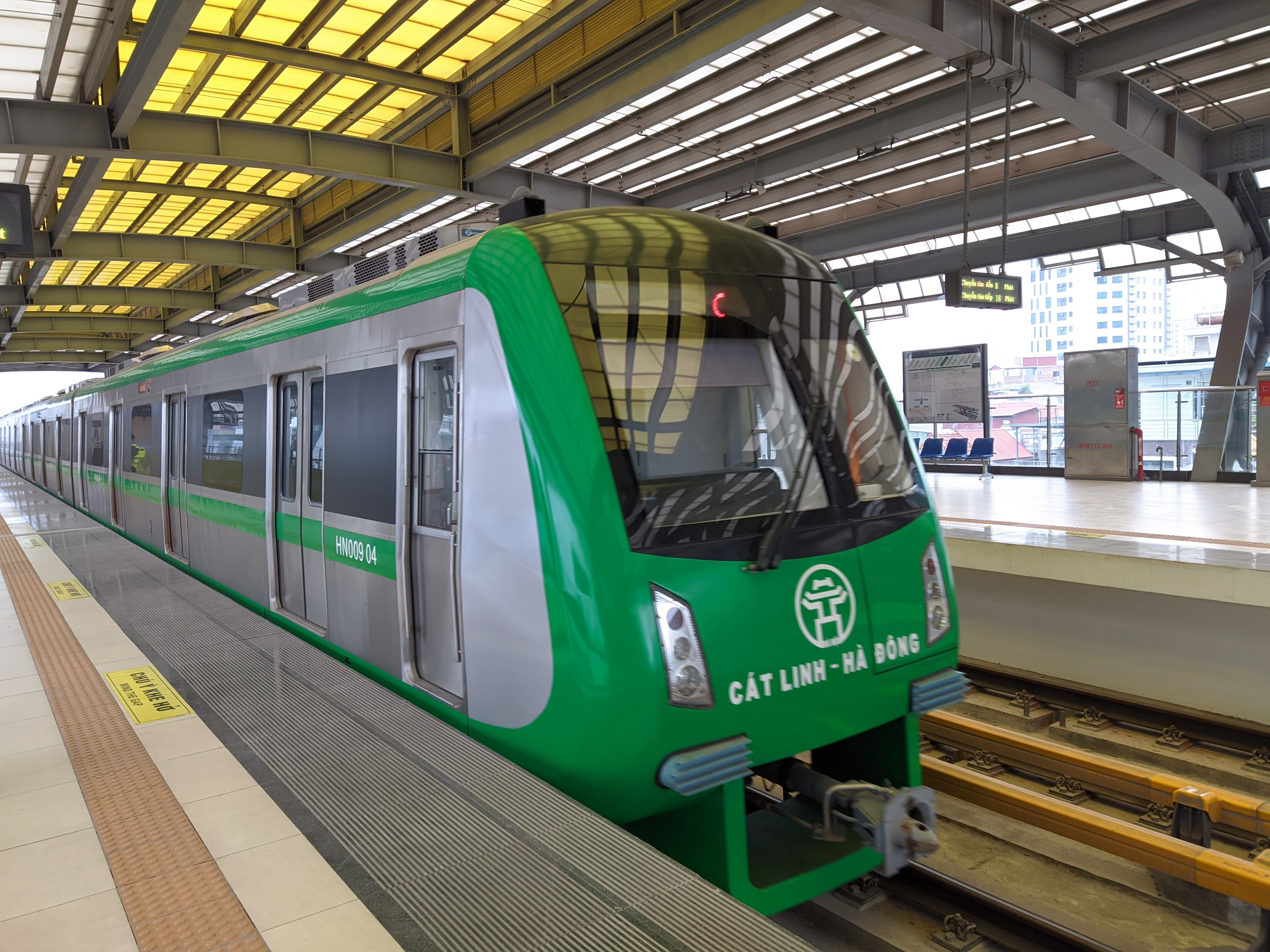
A train entering at Vanh Dai 3 station

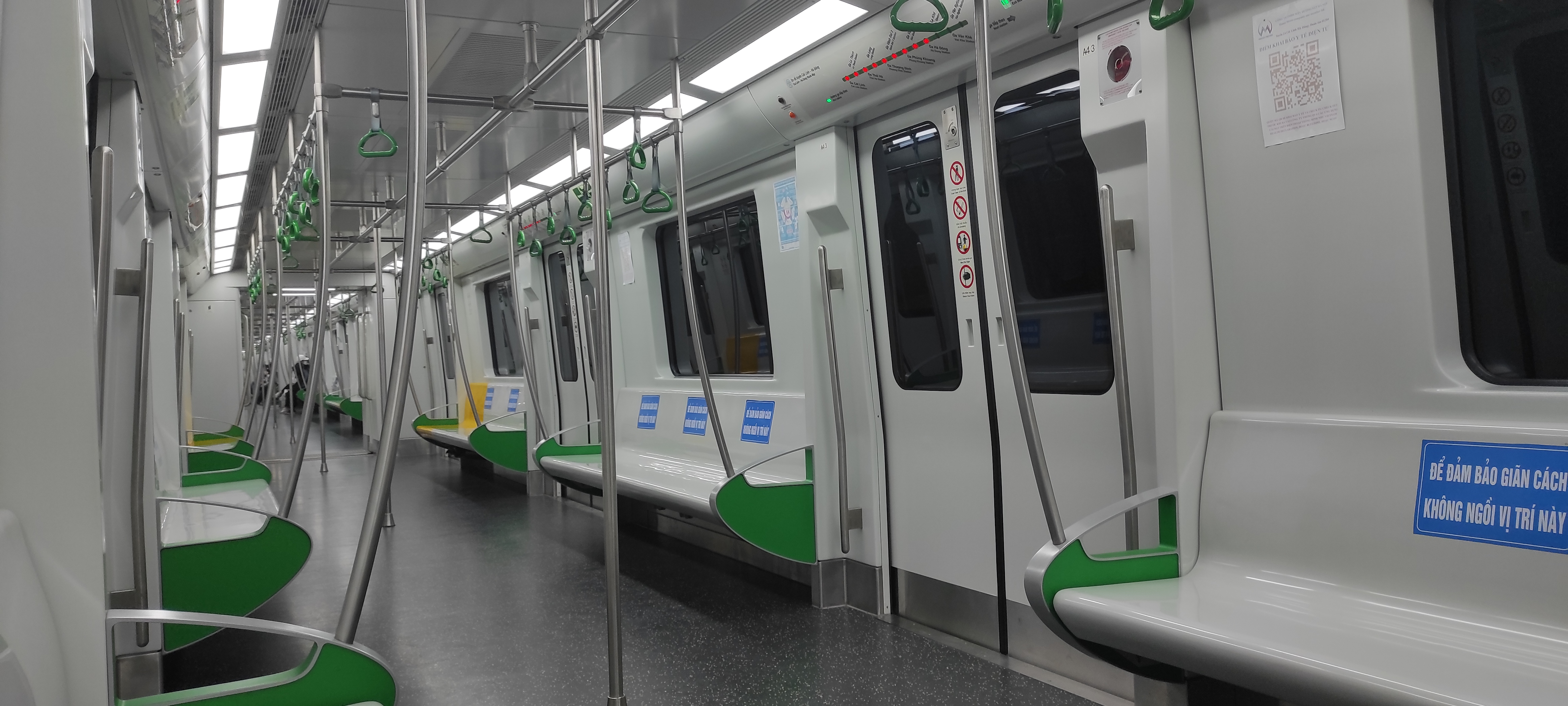
Line 2A train interior

Thirteen 4-car trainsets will be supplied by CRRC, with the first train delivered in March 2017. Electricity is supplied via third rail, to ensure safety, stability and urban landscape. The train has a two-way cockpit and is convertible at both ends. Each car is approximately 20 m (66 ft) long, with four doors on each side. One train has a maximum capacity of about 1,000 passengers, or approximately six passengers/m^{2}.

The track has a 1,435 mm (4 ft 8 1/2 in) standard gauge, and is on-stream welded to ensure high speed, noise protection, vibration and anti-derailment.

A modern automated signalling system (CBTC) ensures safety by governing the speed of the trains and shortens train intervals.

== Depot ==
The depot is located in Phu Luong, Ha Dong District with an area of 19.6 hectares (48 acres). The depot contains an Operation Control Center (OCC), train stabling and maintenance areas, an operational building, a training area and a storage room.

The OCC operates round the clock, and is responsible for monitoring, supervising and controlling the entire system, ensuring smooth operation and safety.

== Fares ==
Line 2A's fares before Aug. 1st 2025 are as follows:

Single journey ticket fares (unit: thousand VND)
Stations	Cat Linh	La Thanh	Thai Ha	Lang	Thuong Dinh	Vanh Dai 3	Phung Khoang	Van Quan	Ha Dong	La Khe	Van Khe	Yen Nghia
Cat Linh		9	10	11	12	13	14	15	16	17	18	19
La Thanh	9		9	10	11	12	13	14	15	16	18	19
Thai Ha	10	9		9	10	11	13	14	15	16	17	18
Lang	11	10	9		10	10	12	13	14	15	16	17
Thuong Dinh	12	11	10	10		9	11	12	13	14	15	16
Vanh Dai 3	13	12	11	10	9		10	11	12	13	14	15
Phung Khoang	14	13	13	12	11	10		9	11	12	13	14
Van Quan	15	14	14	13	12	11	9		10	11	12	13
Ha Dong	16	15	15	14	13	12	11	10		10	11	12
La Khe	17	16	16	15	14	13	12	11	10		10	11
Van Khe	18	18	17	16	15	14	13	12	11	10		9
Yen Nghia	19	19	18	17	16	15	14	13	12	11	9	

Other tickets
Ticket types	Price
Day ticket	40.000 VND/ticket/day
Weekly ticket	160.000 VND/ticket/week
Monthly pass	280.000 VND/pass/30 days of use
Monthly pass for students and industrial zone workers	50% off
Monthly pass for groups over 30 people	30% off
Welfare ticket (for people with free bus passes and people with meritorious services, the elderly, disabled people, children under 6 years old, and people from poor households)	Free of charge

Beginning from Aug. 1st 2025, Line 2A's fares will be as follows:

Single journey ticket fares (unit: thousand VND)
Stations	Cat Linh	La Thanh	Thai Ha	Lang	Thuong Dinh	Vanh Dai 3	Phung Khoang	Van Quan	Ha Dong	La Khe	Van Khe	Yen Nghia
Cat Linh		9	10	11	12	13	14	15	16	17	18	19
La Thanh	9		9	10	11	12	13	14	15	16	18	19
Thai Ha	10	9		9	10	11	13	14	15	16	17	18
Lang	11	10	9		9	10	11	13	14	15	16	17
Thuong Dinh	12	11	10	10		9	11	12	13	14	15	16
Vanh Dai 3	13	12	11	10	9		10	11	12	13	14	15
Phung Khoang	14	13	13	12	11	10		9	11	12	13	14
Van Quan	15	14	14	13	12	11	9		10	11	12	13
Ha Dong	16	15	15	14	13	12	11	10		10	11	12
La Khe	17	16	16	15	14	13	12	11	10		10	11
Van Khe	18	18	17	16	15	14	13	12	11	10		9
Yen Nghia	19	19	18	17	16	15	14	13	12	11	9	

Other tickets
Ticket types	Price
Welfare ticket (for people with free bus passes and people with meritorious services, the elderly, disabled people, children under 6 years old, and people from poor households)	Free of charge

There will also be timed tickets ranging from 1 day to 12 months.

Timed tickets
Duration\Price	Students, workers	Normal passenger
Day ticket	40.000 VND/ticket	
Week ticket	160.000 VND/ticket	
1-month ticket	140.000 VND/ticket	280.000 VND/ticket
2-month ticket	270.000 VND/ticket	550.000 VND/ticket
3-month ticket	410.000 VND/ticket	820.000 VND/ticket
4-month ticket	535.000 VND/ticket	1.075.000 VND/ticket
5-month ticket	670.000 VND/ticket	1.345.000 VND/ticket
6-month ticket	805.000 VND/ticket	1.615.000 VND/ticket
7-month ticket	920.000 VND/ticket	1.840.000 VND/ticket
8-month ticket	1.050.000 VND/ticket	2.105.000 VND/ticket
9-month ticket	1.185.000 VND/ticket	2.367.000 VND/ticket
10-month ticket	1.315.000 VND/ticket	2.630.000 VND/ticket
11-month ticket	1.450.000 VND/ticket	2.895.000 VND/ticket
12-month ticket	1.580.000 VND/ticket	3.158.000 VND/ticket

== Connections ==
Line 2A is designed to ensure connectivity with other lines in the future and bus stops along the line to allow the public flexibility in selecting a route and the appropriate modes of transportation.

- Along the line: connected with BRT 01 at Yen Nghia, Van Khe, La Khe and Cat Linh stations.
- Cat Linh station: linked with Line 3, Nhon - Ha Noi section.
- Thuong Dinh station: linked with Line 2, Nam Thang Long - Thuong Dinh section.
- Yen Nghia station: connected with Yen Nghia bus station (in the southwest of the city).
- In the future, Line 2A will be connected with Line 4 (Lien Ha - Me Linh) and line 8 (Son Dong - Duong Xa).

== See also ==
- Line 3 (Hanoi Metro)
- Transport in Vietnam
- Ho Chi Minh City Metro
- Megaproject
