= Lang station =

Lang station can refer to:

- Lang station (Hanoi), a metro station in Hanoi, Vietnam
- Lang Southern Pacific Station, a historic train station near Santa Clarita, California, United States
