= Hanoi BRT =

Transit bus system in Hanoi, Vietnam

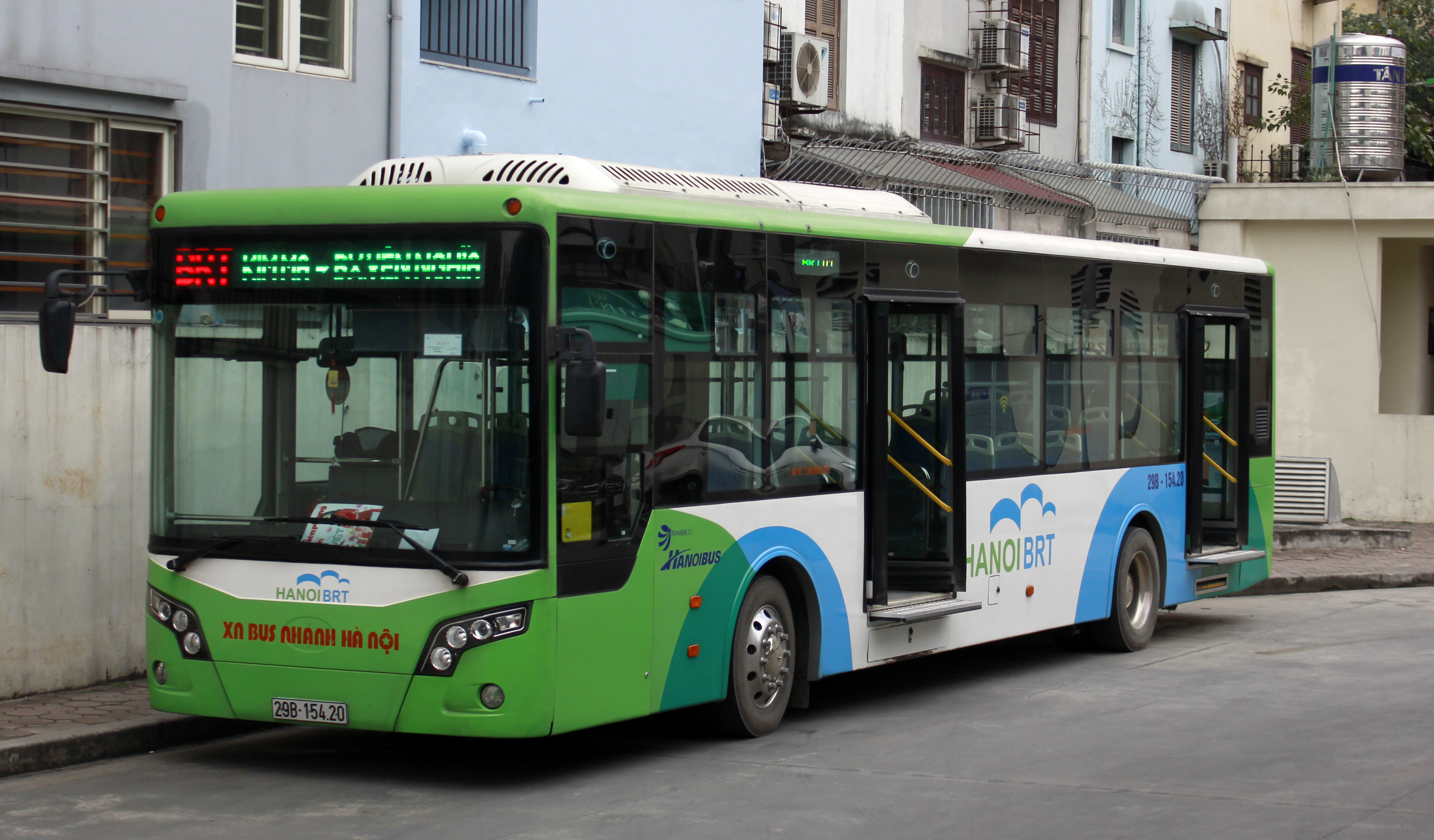

Overview
- Locale: Hanoi, Vietnam
- Transit type: Bus rapid transit
- Line number: 1
- Number of stations: 23
- Website: https://hanoibrt.vn

Operation
- Began operation: 31 December 2016
- Number of vehicles: 35

Technical
- System length: 14.5 km (9.0 mi)
System map
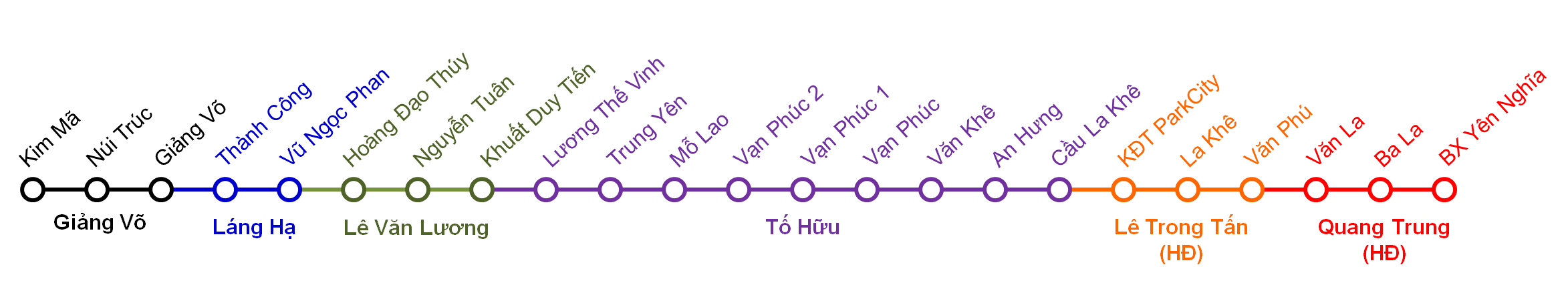

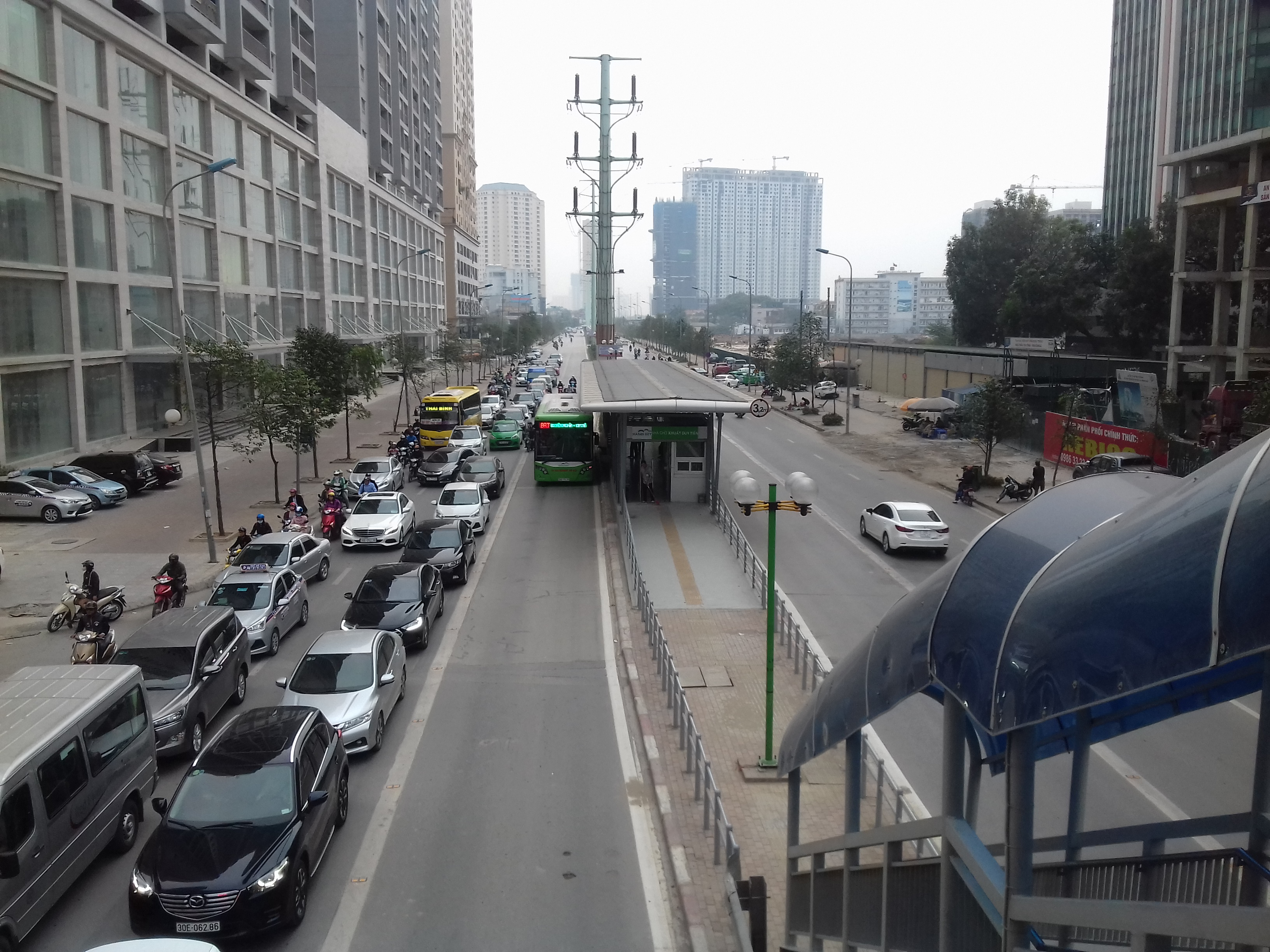
Bus stop

Hanoi BRT or Hanoi Bus Rapid Transit is a transit bus system with large roadway shelters in Hanoi, Vietnam that opened on 31 December 2016, that began as a pilot project.

The Kim Ma station in Đống Đa district and Yen Nghia station in Hà Đông district route runs 14.5-km route, albeit with problems of traffic separation and heavy usage during rush hours, meanwhile very under-utilised during other hours. Nevertheless, a second line is planned.
