= Line 3 (Hanoi Metro) =

Metro line in Hanoi, Vietnam

- Line 3 (Hanoi Metro)
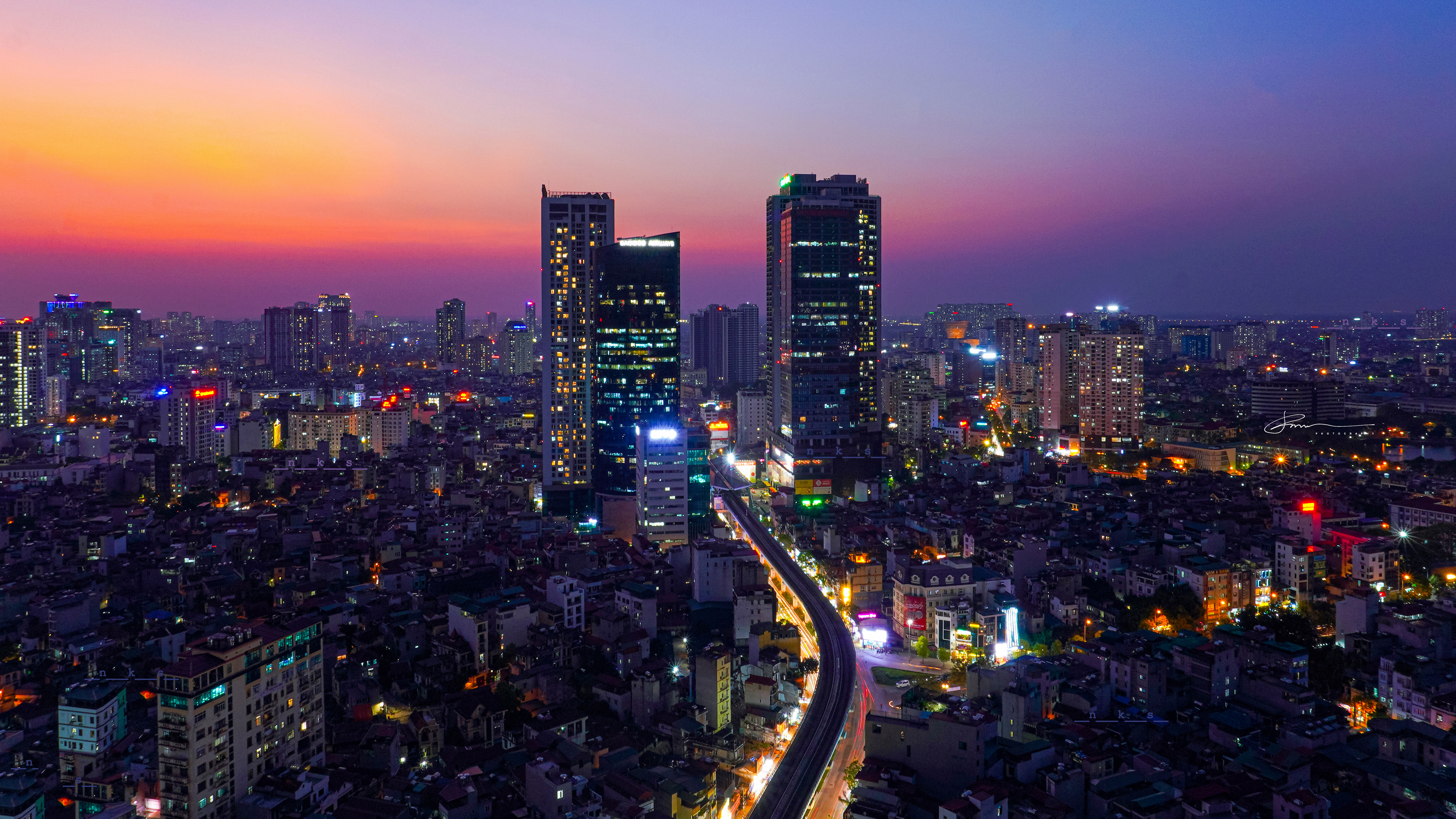
- View of the metro line at Chùa Hà station (middle)

Overview
- Native name: Tuyến 3
- Status: Completed (elevated section), 79.5% complete (underground section) as of June 2026
- Owner: Hanoi People's Committee
- Line number: 3
- Termini: Nhon; Cau Giay
- Stations: Phase 1 (Nhon - Hanoi Station): 8 (current)
- Website: hanoimetro.net.vn

Service
- Type: Rapid transit
- System: Hanoi Metro
- Operator: Hanoi Metro Company (HMC)
- Depot: Nhon Depot
- Rolling stock: 10 4-carriage Alstom Metropolis trains (40 carriages)
- Ridership: 8,600 passengers/hour/direction

History
- Planned opening: Late 2027 (for Kim Mã ‐ Hanoi station)
- Opened: 8 August 2024 (elevated section)

Technical
- Line length: Phase 1: 12.5 km (7.8 mi)
- Number of tracks: 2
- Track gauge: 1,435 mm (4 ft 8 1/2 in) standard gauge
- Electrification: Third rail, 750 V DC
- Operating speed: 35 km/h (22 mph); 80 km/h (50 mph) maximum

Line 3 of the Hanoi Metro (Vietnamese: Tuyến số 3 đường sắt đô thị Hà Nội) is a rapid transit line in Hanoi, Vietnam. The line currently runs from Nhổn, a suburb in Bắc Từ Liêm District, west of city center, to its current terminus in Cầu Giấy Bus Interchange, located in Cầu Giấy district. When fully operational, the line will continue eastbound toward Hanoi Station, providing a direct connection to downtown Hanoi and the city's main railway station. The line operates between 5.30 am and 10pm, with headways of 6 minutes during peak hours (7 am - 8.30 am and 4.30 pm to 6pm), and 10 minutes during off-peak hours. All trains on Line 3 operate with a 4-cars formation.

This line was the first to be built in Hanoi Metro network, starting construction in September 2010 with an expected completion date in late 2016, with a budget of 18 trillion VND (US$1 billion in 2010) However, the project was plagued with delays and budget overrun, total about 34.532 trillion VND (US$1.46 billion) in 2022.

The line is divided into three segments: The first segment, which runs from Nhổn to Hanoi Station. This segment is 12.5 kilometres (7.8 mi) long, consists of 12 stations in total, with the first 8.5 kilometres (5.3 mi) (between Nhon and Cau Giay) running elevated, while the last 4 kilometres (2.5 mi) (between Cau Giay) and Ha Noi running underground. In addition, there have been plans for a southern extension (second segment), which will run from Hanoi Station to southern district of Hoàng Mai, and a northern extension (third segment) toward Sơn Tây. Currently, only the elevated phase of first segment (between Nhon and Cau Giay) is operational. About 20% of Hanoi's population in 6 districts Ba Đình, Cầu Giấy, Đống Đa, Hoàn Kiếm, Nam Từ Liêm and Bắc Từ Liêm can benefit from this line.

== History ==
=== Initial developments ===
Line 3 dated back to 1998, when the Vietnamese government approved the 2020 vision Master Plan, which prioritise the building of a rail transit system, with a target to build 5 metro lines. Line 3 was one of the original lines considered in the master plan.

Two separate preliminary feasibility studies was conducted in 2004 and 2005 with the help of the Asian Development Bank to determine the viability of Line 3.

Four options were originally considered:

1. An elevated metro line running from Nhổn depot to Swedish Embassy on Kim Mã Avenue, then running underground to Hanoi Station;
2. An at-grade tramway section between Nhổn and Ringway 3, then an elevated line to Swedish Embassy on Kim Mã Avenue, then running underground to Hanoi Station;
3. Similar to option 2, but the at-grade tramway would be converted to a dedicated metro line;
4. An at-grade tramway section between Nhổn and to Swedish Embassy on Kim Mã Avenue, then running underground to Hanoi Station.

Out of all options, options 2 and 3 were eliminated from further consideration due to congestion and performance issues associated with a mixed circulation tramway system. Option 4 was discounted from further consideration because even though it involved a system operating on a partially dedicated route, significant adverse changes to traffic management were required, particularly at intersections and pedestrian crossings and it would have resulted in reduced operating efficiencies and travel times. As a result, option 1, which was forecasted to carry up to 458,000 people daily, was selected as the preferred option.

The name and location of stations were finalized in the 2009 Final Feasibility Study. Based on this study, fifteen stations were reduced to 12 stations, 8 elevated and 4 underground. A twin bored tunnel concept using tunnel boring machines (TBM) was selected to tunnel 15 to 8 m underground and to utilize the centerline of existing surface roads. Two underground stations, Cat Linh and Van Mieu, were relocated one block eastward to avoid cultural significant sites.

== Budget ==
Beside 276 million euros from the Hanoi city's budget, the project also receives 726 million euros from the four donors - the French government (DGT), French Development Agency (AFD), Asian Development Bank (ADB), and European Investment Bank (EIB).

== Construction progress ==
Implementation of the project is delayed by four years compared to the original schedule with completion expected in 2021. As of March 2017, the project has achieved 30% physical progress over the elapsed project life of 9 years. However, the project completion is expected to be delayed to 2027.

The 8.5 kilometres elevated section opened on 8 August 2024 betweem Nhon and Hanol station.

== Route ==
Route of the Hanoi Metro Line 3 as of now

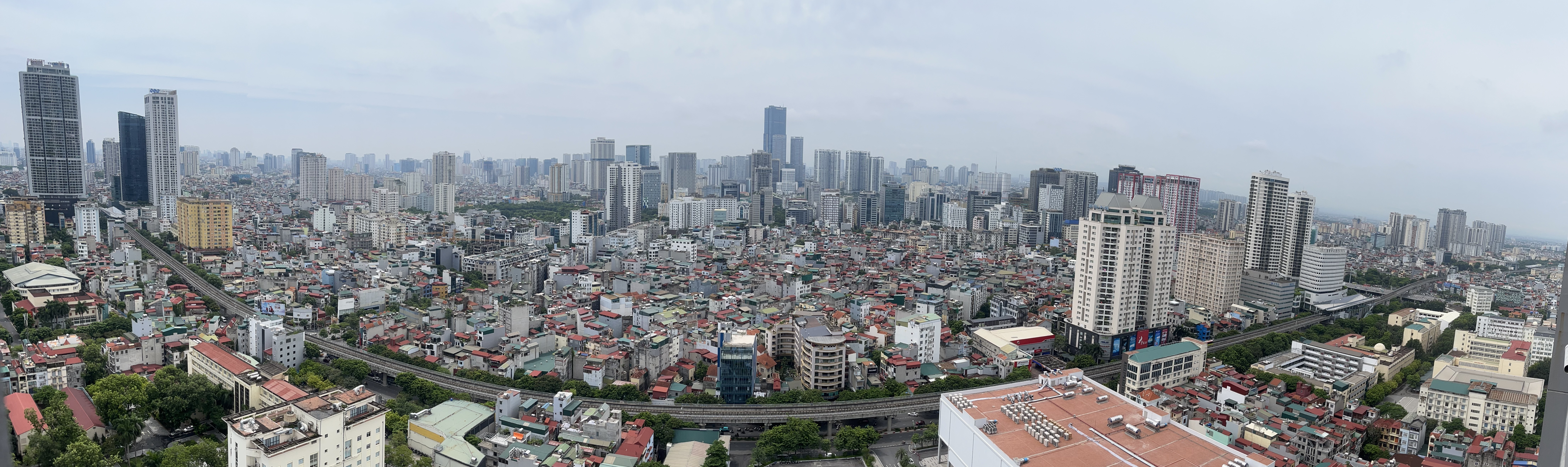
Elevated section passing over Xuân Thuỷ road. Visible stations from left to right are: Chùa Hà, National University, Lê Đức Thọ stations.

Line 3: Nhon - Ha Noi section starts from Nhổn - to National Highway 32 - Cau Dien - Mai Dich - Ring Road 3 intersection - Cau Giay (Ring Road 2 intersection) - Kim Ma - Giang Vo - Cat Linh - Quoc Tu Giam and ends at Tran Hung Dao Street, in front of Ha Noi railway station.

== Stations ==
=== Phase 1 ===
The 1st phase of Line 3 has 12 stations including 8 elevated stations (Nhổn, Minh Khai, Phú Diễn, Cầu Diễn, Lê Đức Thọ, National University, Chùa Hà, Cầu Giấy) and 4 underground stations (Kim Ma, Cat Linh, Van Mieu, Ha Noi), with concourse level, elevators and lifts. The railway platform is 109 metres (358 ft) long.

Station symbol	Station name		Metro transfers	Distance between stations	Total distance	Location
Station symbol	English	Vietnamese	Metro transfers	Distance between stations	Total distance	Ward/Commune
T3 S01	Nhon	Nhổn	(planned)	0 km (0 mi)	0 km (0 mi)	Between Tây Tựu and Xuân Phương
T3 S02	Minh Khai			1.129 km (0.702 mi)	1.129 km (0.702 mi)	Between Phú Diễn and Xuân Phương
T3 S03	Phu Dien	Phú Diễn	(planned)	1.174 km (0.729 mi)	2.303 km (1.431 mi)	Between Phú Diễn and Xuân Phương
T3 S04	Cau Dien	Cầu Diễn		0.831 km (0.516 mi)	3.134 km (1.947 mi)	Between Phú Diễn and Từ Liêm
T3 S05	Le Duc Tho	Lê Đức Thọ		1.125 km (0.699 mi)	4.259 km (2.646 mi)	Between Phú Diễn and Từ Liêm
T3 S06	National University	Đại học Quốc Gia	(planned)	1.03 km (0.64 mi)	5.289 km (3.286 mi)	Cầu Giấy
T3 S07	Chua Ha	Chùa Hà	(planned)	1.225 km (0.761 mi)	6.514 km (4.048 mi)	Cầu Giấy
T3 S08	Cau Giay	Cầu Giấy		1.165 km (0.724 mi)	7.679 km (4.772 mi)	Between Giảng Võ and Láng
T3 S09	Kim Ma	Kim Mã	(planned)	1.198 km (0.744 mi)	8.877 km (5.516 mi)	Giảng Võ
T3 S10	Cat Linh	Cát Linh	Line 2A (Hanoi Metro)	1.52 km (0.94 mi)	10.397 km (6.460 mi)	Ô Chợ Dừa
T3 S11	Van Mieu	Văn Miếu		0.871 km (0.541 mi)	11.268 km (7.002 mi)	Văn Miếu - Quốc Tử Giám
T3 S12	Ha Noi	Hà Nội	(planned)	0.701 km (0.436 mi)	11.969 km (7.437 mi)	Cửa Nam

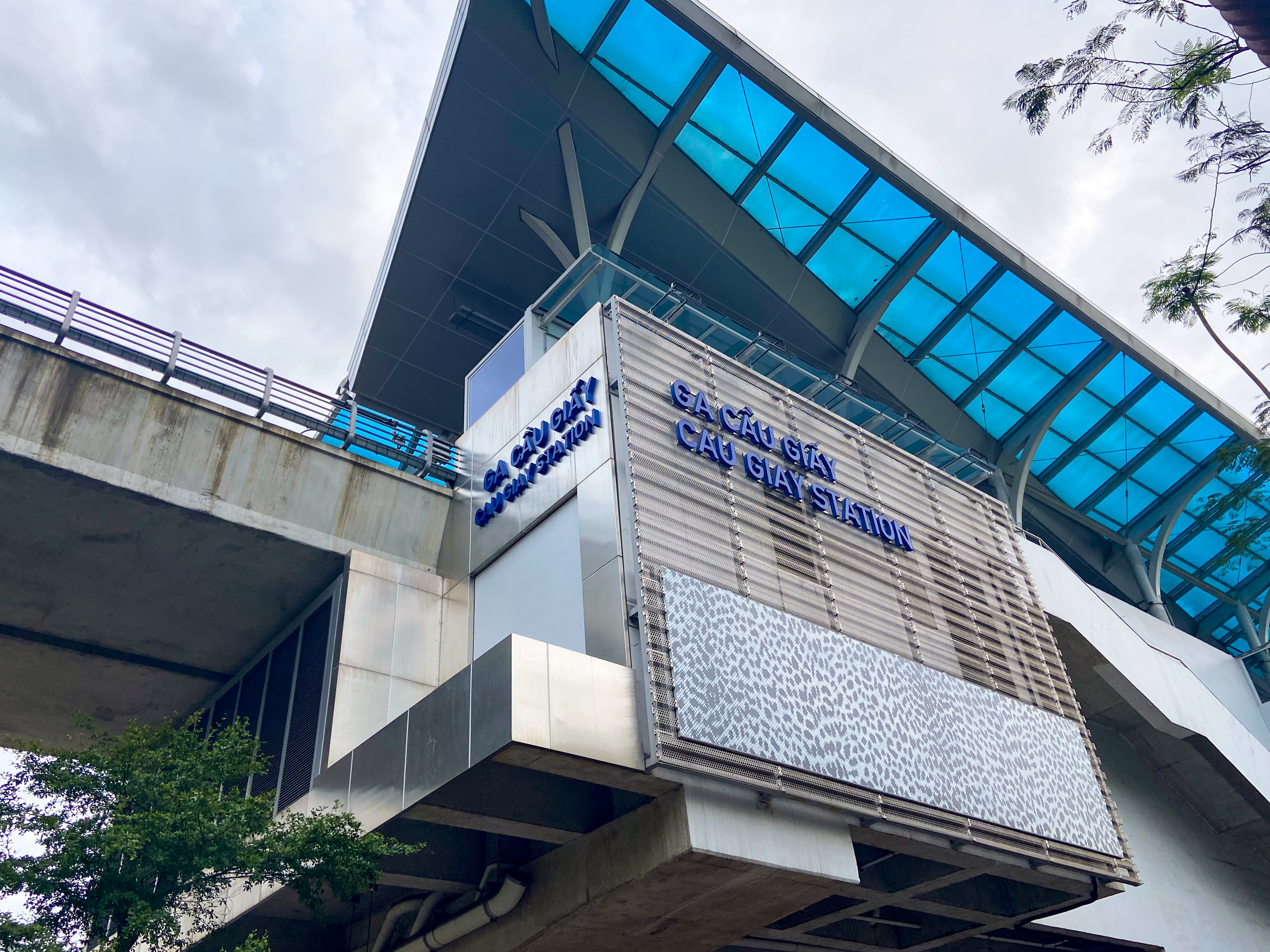
Cau Giay station

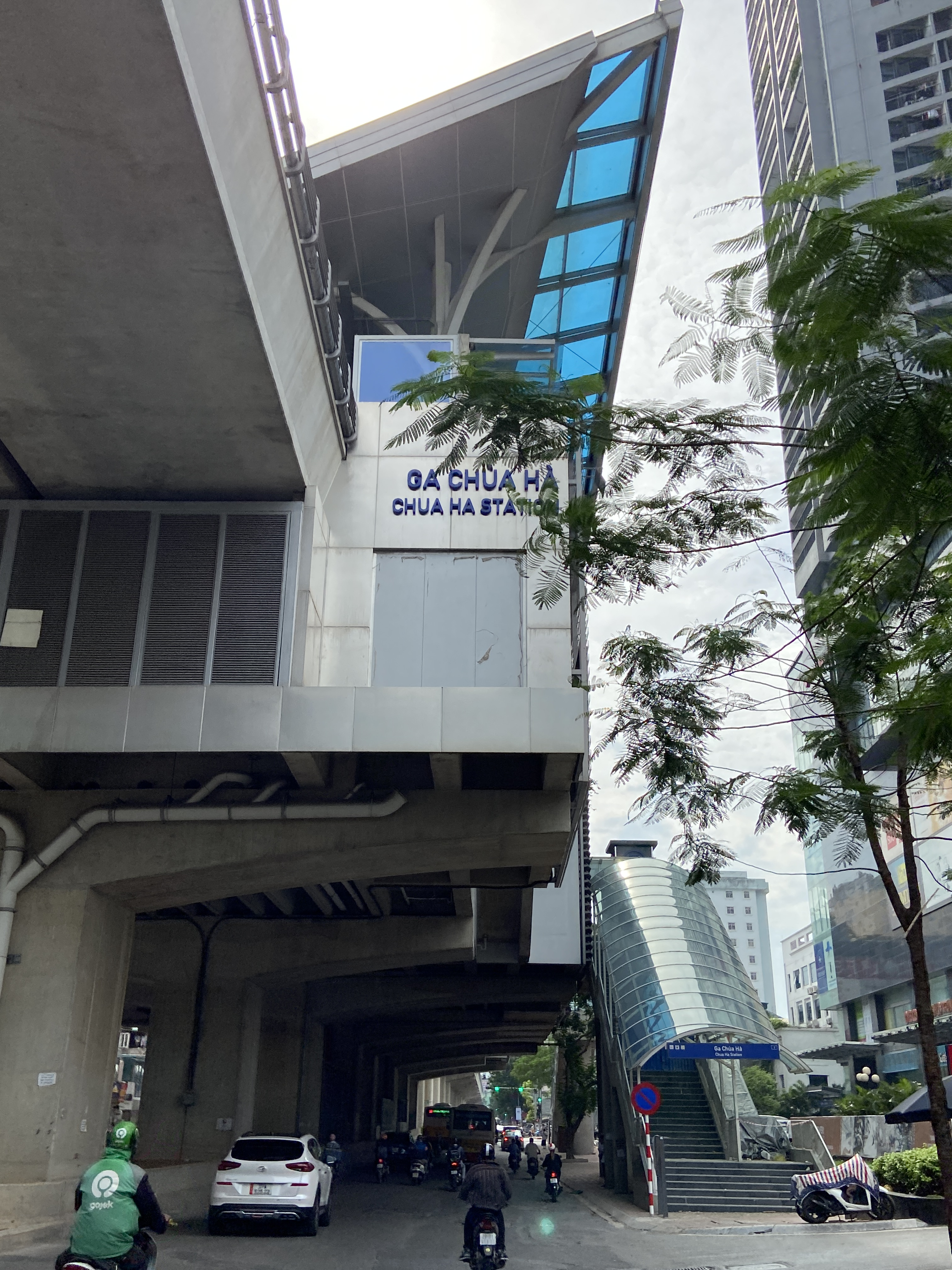
Chua Ha station

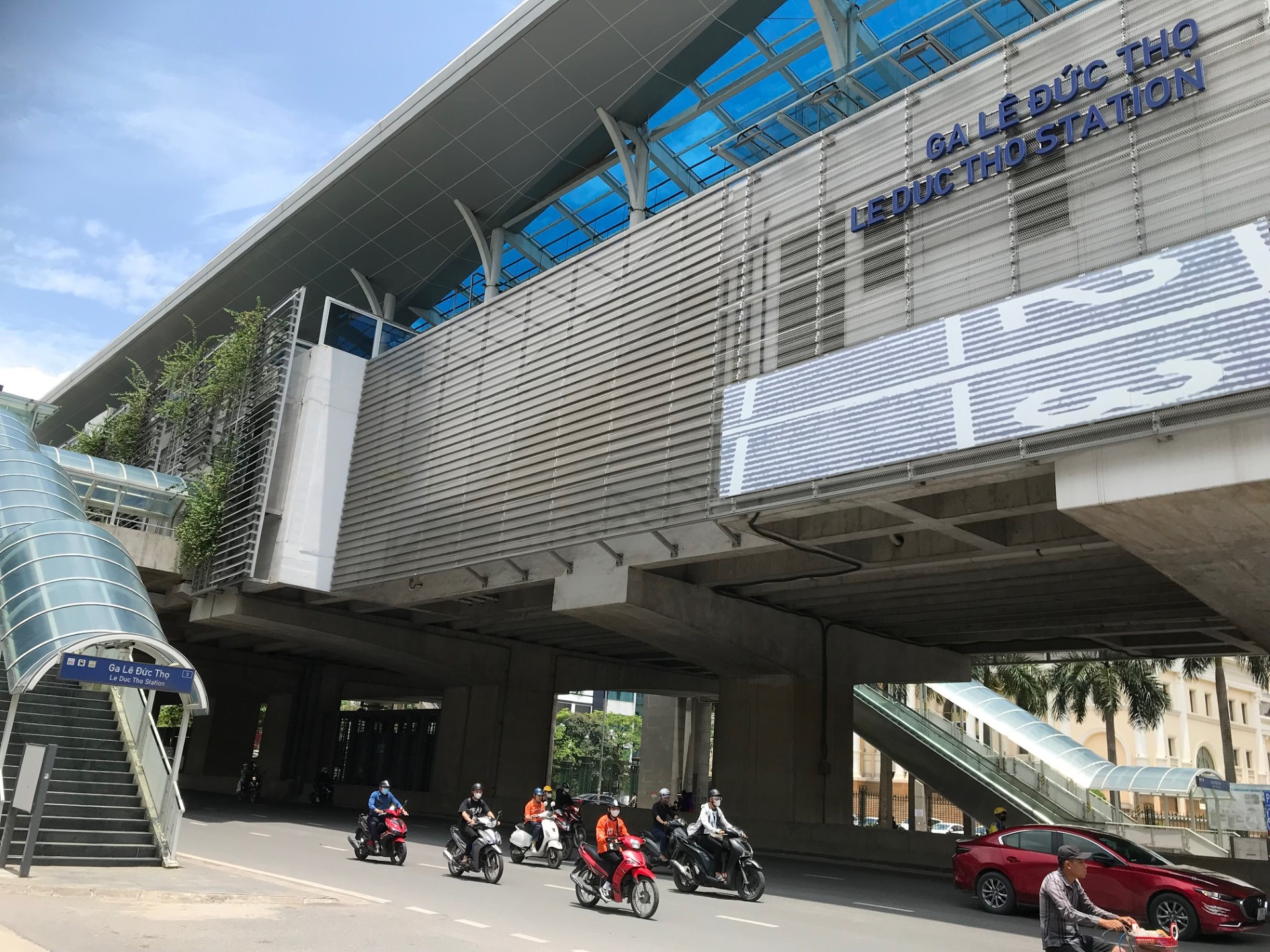
Le Duc Tho station

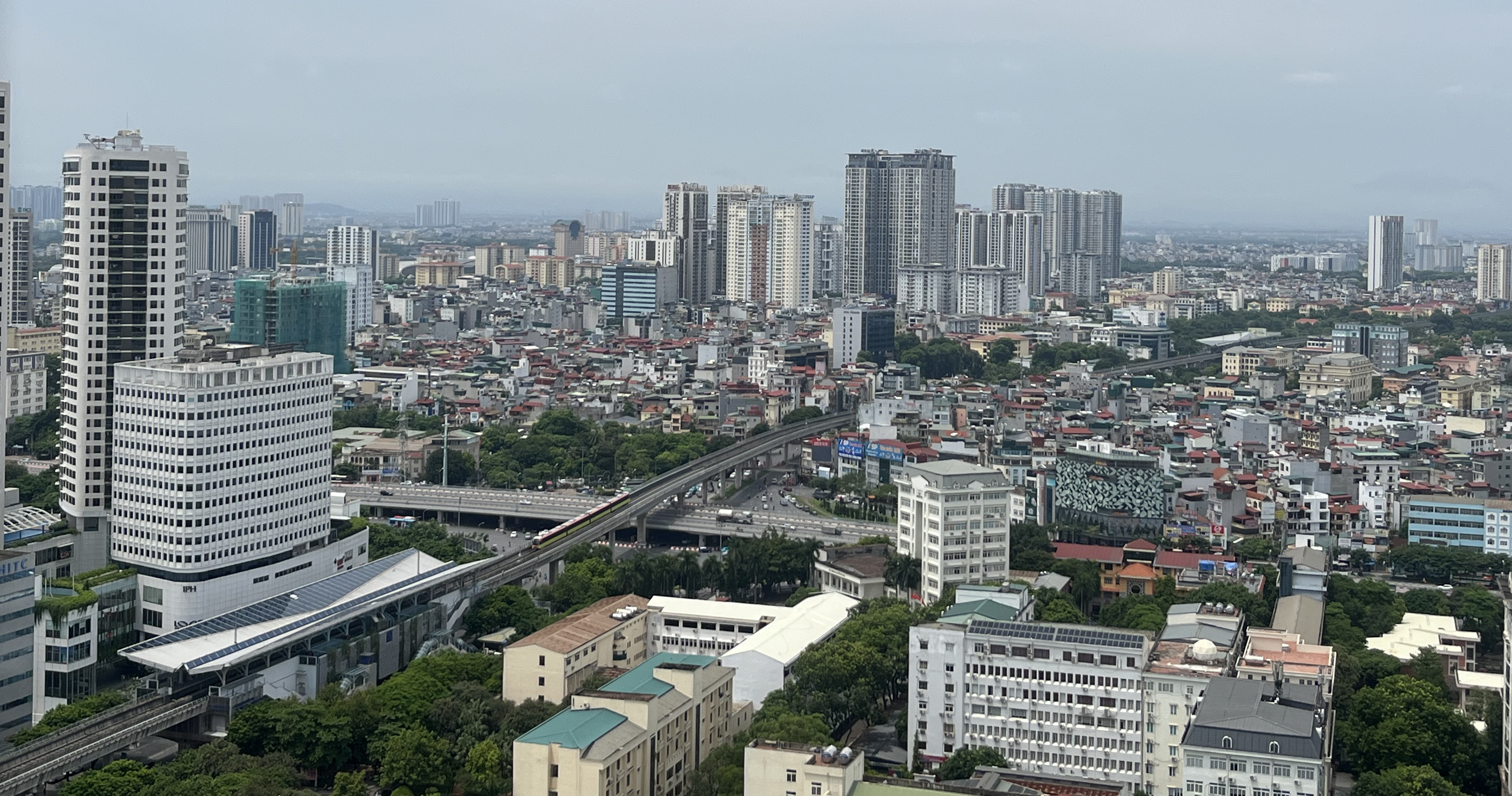
National University station

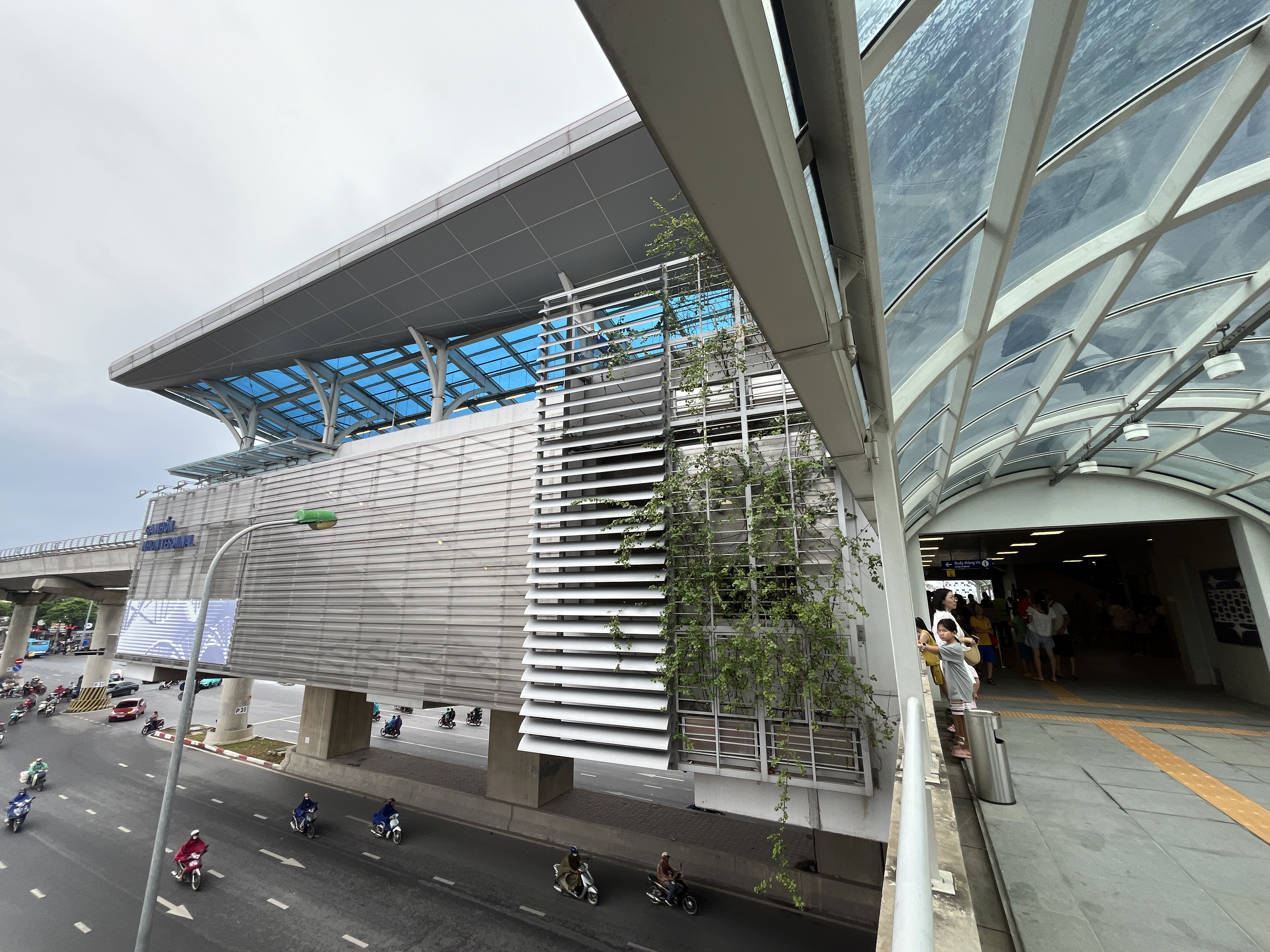
Nhon station

=== Phase 2 ===
The 2nd phase of Line 3 will have 7 more stations (Hàng Bài, Trần Thánh Tông, Kim Ngưu, Mai Động, Tân Mai, Tam Trinh, Yên Sở) all being completely underground with 1 depot located near Yên Sở Pumping Station. This section is 8786 m long (8.13 km underground, the remaining is for tunnel and on ground).

Station symbol	Station name		Metro transfers	Distance between stations	Total distance from S01	Location	
Station symbol	English	Vietnamese	Metro transfers	Distance between stations	Total distance from S01	Ward	
T3 S13	Hang Bai	Hàng Bài	(connects with Trần Hưng Đạo) (planned)	0.657 km (0.408 mi)	12.626 km (7.845 mi)	Cửa Nam	
T3 S14	Tran Thanh Tong	Trần Thánh Tông		1.232 km (0.766 mi)	13.858 km (8.611 mi)	Hai Bà Trưng	Phạm Đình Hổ
T3 S15	Kim Nguu	Kim Ngưu		0.981 km (0.610 mi)	14.839 km (9.221 mi)	Hai Bà Trưng	Thanh Lương
T3 S16	Mai Dong	Mai Động		1.193 km (0.741 mi)	16.032 km (9.962 mi)	Hoàng Mai	Mai Động
T3 S17	Tan Mai	Tân Mai	(planned)	1.353 km (0.841 mi)	17.385 km (10.803 mi)	Hoàng Mai	Hoàng Văn Thụ
T3 S18	Tam Trinh	Tam Trinh		1.443 km (0.897 mi)	18.828 km (11.699 mi)	Hoàng Mai	Yên Sở
T3 S19	Yen So	Yên Sở		0.869 km (0.540 mi)	19.697 km (12.239 mi)	Hoàng Mai	Yên Sở

== Fares ==
Beginning from Aug. 1st 2025, Line 3's fares are as follows:

Single journey ticket fares (unit: thousand VND)
Stations	Nhon	Minh Khai	Phu Dien	Cau Dien	Le Duc Tho	National University	Chua Ha	Cau Giay
Nhon		9	10	11	12	13	14	15
Minh Khai	9		9	10	11	12	13	14
Phu Dien	10	9		9	10	11	12	13
Cau Dien	11	10	9		9	10	11	12
Le Duc Tho	12	11	10	9		9	10	11
National University	13	12	11	10	9		9	10
Chua Ha	14	13	12	11	10	9		9
Cau Giay	15	14	13	12	11	10	9	

Other tickets
Ticket types	Price
Welfare ticket (for people with free bus passes)	Free of charge

== See also ==
- Line 2A (Hanoi Metro)
- Transport in Vietnam
- Ho Chi Minh City Metro
- Megaproject
- Hanoi Metro
