= Cat Linh station =

Metro station in Hanoi, Vietnam

Cat Linh Cát Linh
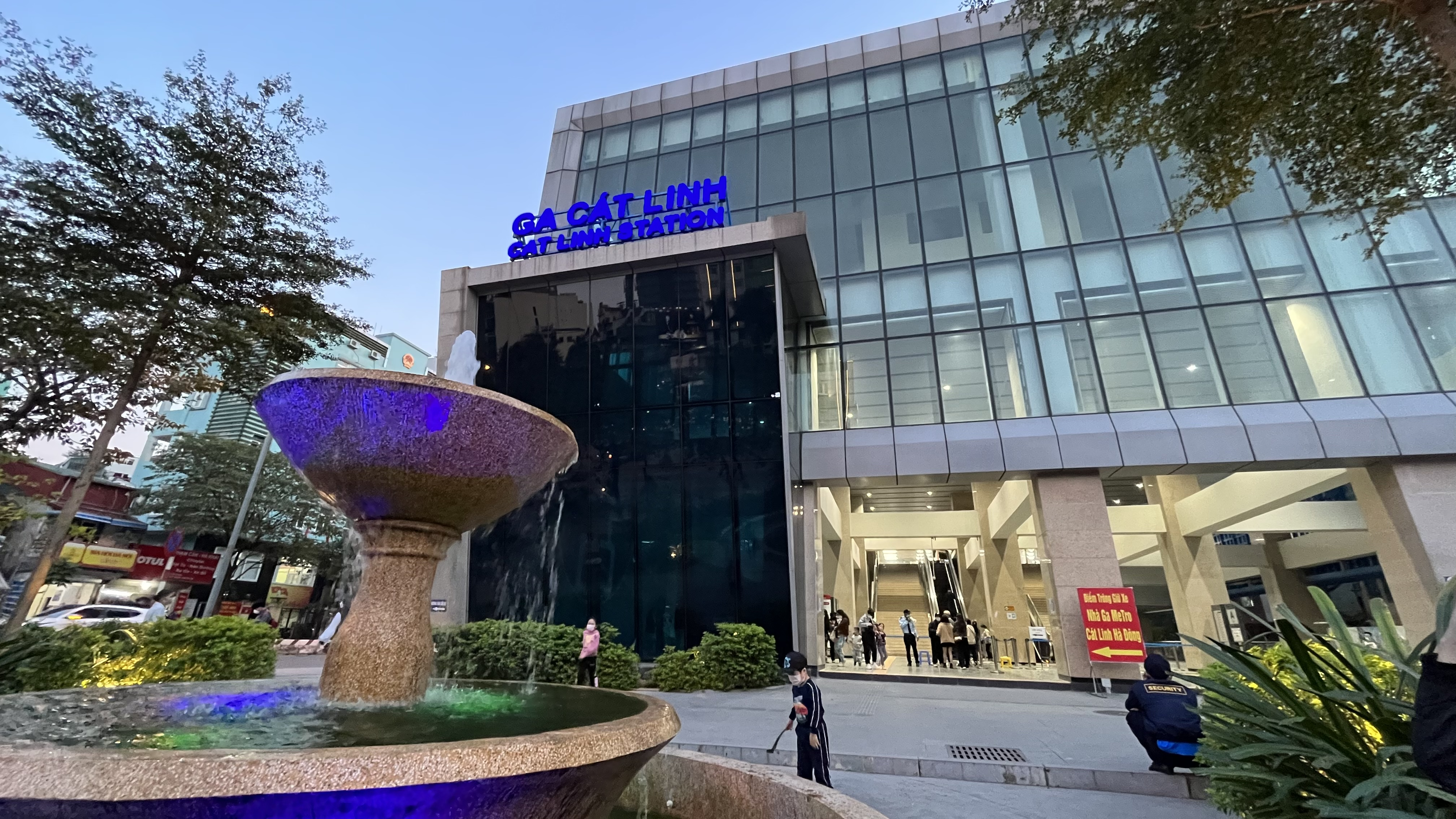
- Front gate of Cat Linh station

General information
- Location: ● Line 2A: 167 Hào Nam street, Ô Chợ Dừa ward, Hanoi, Vietnam
- Coordinates: 21°1′41″N 105°49′38″E
- System: T2AC01 T3 S10
- Owner: Vietnam Railways
- Operator: Hanoi Metro
- Lines: Cat Linh Line; Van Mieu Line
- Platforms: ● Cát Linh Line: 3 (2 side platforms + 1 island platform) ● Van Mieu Line: 1 island platform
- Tracks: 4
- Bus routes: 22A, 23, 25, 38, 49, 50, 90, 99, 142, 143, 144, 146, BRT01 , E02

Construction
- Structure type: ● Line 2A: Elevated (2F) ● Line 3: Underground (B2F)
- Accessible: Yes

History
- Opened: 6 November 2021; 4 years ago (Line 2A)
- Opening: December 2027 (Line 3)

Key dates
- 6 November 2021: Opening of ● Cat Linh Line
- 7 March 2025: ● Van Mieu Line's TBM1 ("Thần tốc") reached the S10 underground station
- 15 September 2025: ● Line 3's TBM2 ("Táo bạo") approached the S10 underground station

Services
Preceding station	Hanoi Metro	Following station
Terminus	Line 2A	La Thanh T2AC02 towards Yen Nghia
Kim Ma T3 S09 towards Nhon	Line 3	Van Mieu T3 S11 towards Ha Noi
Route map
Line 2A
Line 3
Location

Cat Linh station (Vietnamese: Ga Cát Linh) is a metro station in Hanoi, located in Ô Chợ Dừa ward, Hanoi.

It is an interchange station of the Cat Linh Line and the Van Mieu Line.

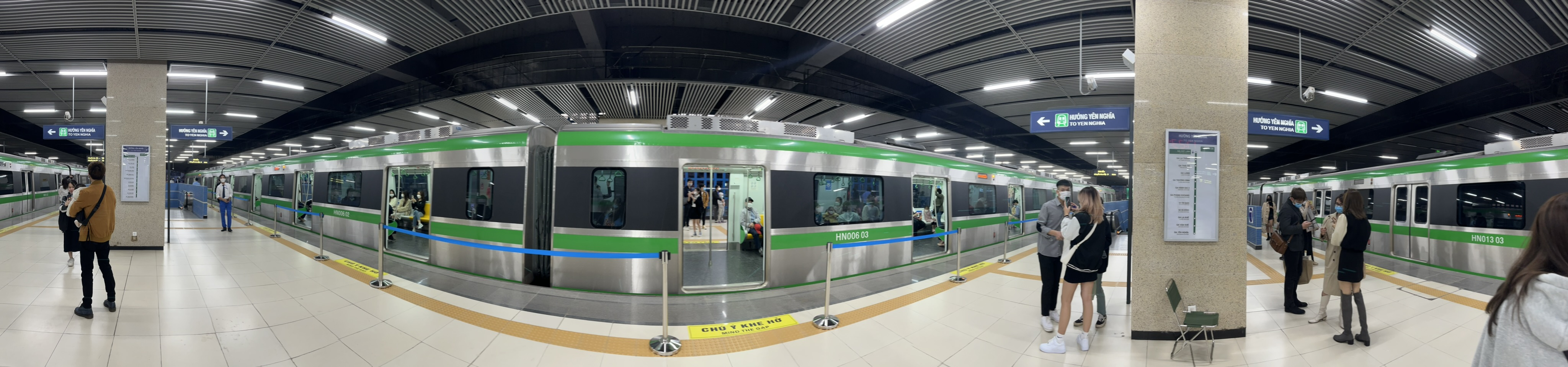
Panoramic view of two trains waiting for departure at Cat Linh station.

== Structure ==
Cát Linh elevated station (the starting point of the Cát Linh Line) is located on Hào Nam street. It has a floor area of about 18,000 square meters, including 3 floors. S10 Cát Linh underground station (on the Van Mieu Line) is located on Cát Linh street.

Cát Linh elevated station and S10 Cát Linh underground station are about 200-300 meters apart, but there is no path for passengers. Hanoi Department of Transport is planning to build a pedestrian tunnel connecting these two stations.

=== Station layout ===
==== Line 2A (2F) ====
...

==== Line 3 (B2F) ====
...

2F
Platform
Side platform, doors will open on the left. Passengers exit here.
Platform
Not used
Island platform, doors will open on the left/right. Passengers enter the trains here.
Platform
T2A Line 2A to La Thanh (for Yen Nghia) →
Side platform, doors will open on the right. Passengers exit here.
1F
Concourse
1st Floor
Ticket sales area, commercial area, technical area, platform entrances and ticket gate
G
Ground Floor
Entrances, parking lots, technical area, commercial area and transfer area

Transfer to T3 Line 3

B1F
Concourse
Underground Floor 1
Ticket sales area, commercial area, technical area, platform entrances, ticket gates and transfer area

Transfer to T2A Line 2A

B2F
Platform
Platform 2
← T3 Line 3 to Kim Ma (for Nhon) (under construction)
Island platform, doors will open on the left
Platform 1
T3 Line 3 to Van Mieu (for Ha Noi) (under construction) →

== Technical problem ==
At around 10 a.m. on 11 February 2023, Cát Linh Station had a technical problem, which caused a train to stop midway. After 40 minutes, the problem was resolved.
