= Yen Nghia station =

Metro station in Hanoi, Vietnam

Yen Nghia Yên Nghĩa
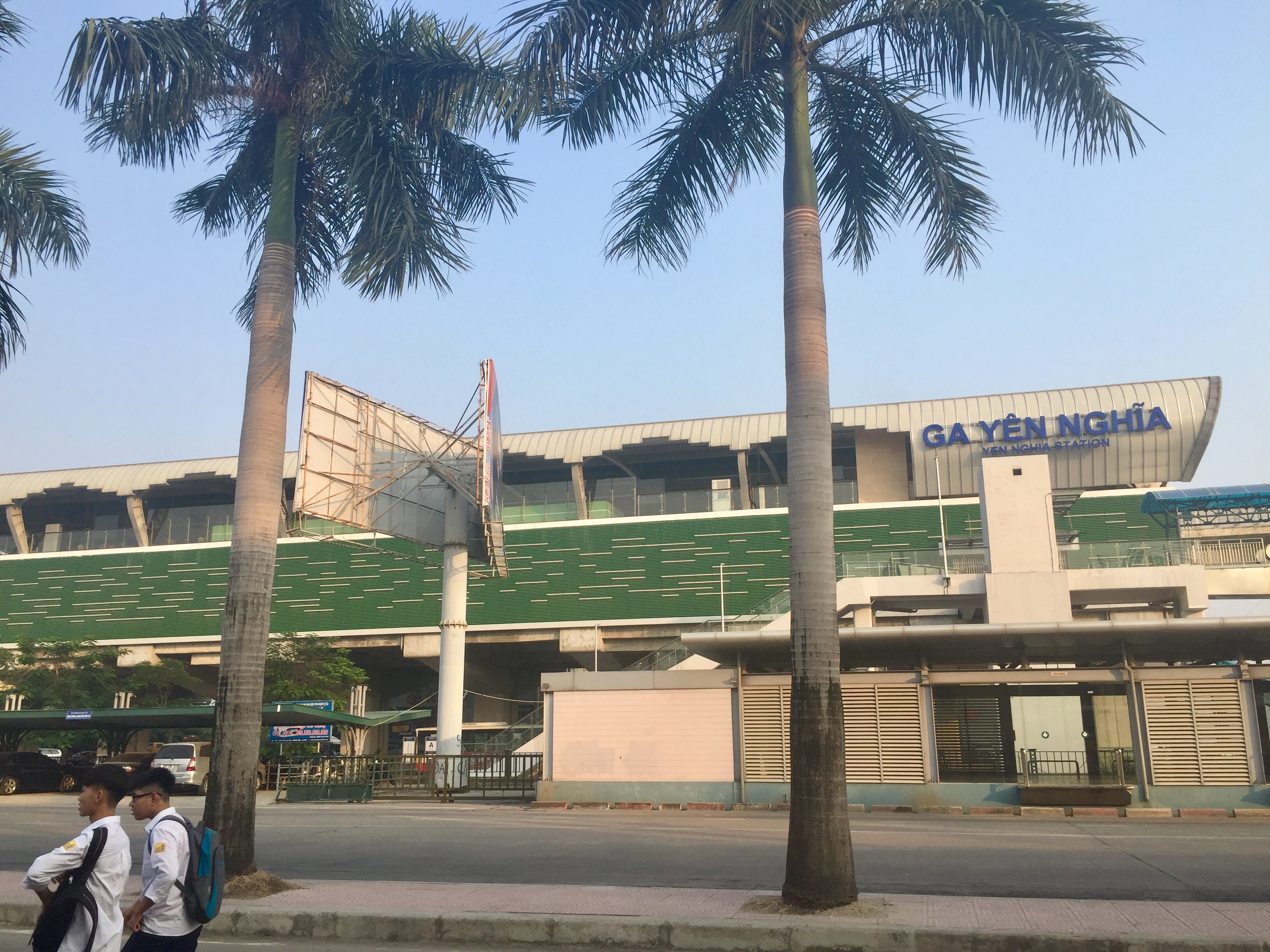
- Yên Nghĩa Station in 2019

General information
- Location: Hà Đông, Hanoi, Vietnam
- Coordinates: 20°56′59″N 105°44′54″E
- System: T2AC12
- Owner: Vietnam Railways
- Operator: Hanoi Metro
- Line: Line 2A
- Platforms: 2
- Tracks: 2

Construction
- Structure type: Elevated
- Accessible: Yes

History
- Opened: 6 November 2021; 4 years ago

Services
Preceding station	Hanoi Metro	Following station
Van Khe T2AC11 towards Cat Linh	Line 2A	Terminus
Route map
Location

Yen Nghia station (Vietnamese: Ga Yên Nghĩa) is a metro station in Hanoi, located in Hà Đông, Hanoi.

Hanoi BRT connects between this station and Kim Ma station.

== Station layout ==
=== Line 2A ===
2F; Platform
2F; Platform	Side platform, doors will open on the right
2F; Platform	Platform	← T2A Line 2A to Van Khe (for Cat Linh)
2F; Platform	Platform	Passengers exit here
2F; Platform	Side platform, doors will open on the right
1F; Concourse	1st Floor	Ticket sales area, commercial area, technical area, platform entrances and ticket gate
G	Ground Floor	Entrances
