= Quan Triều =

Quan Triều Phường Quan Triều
- Ward
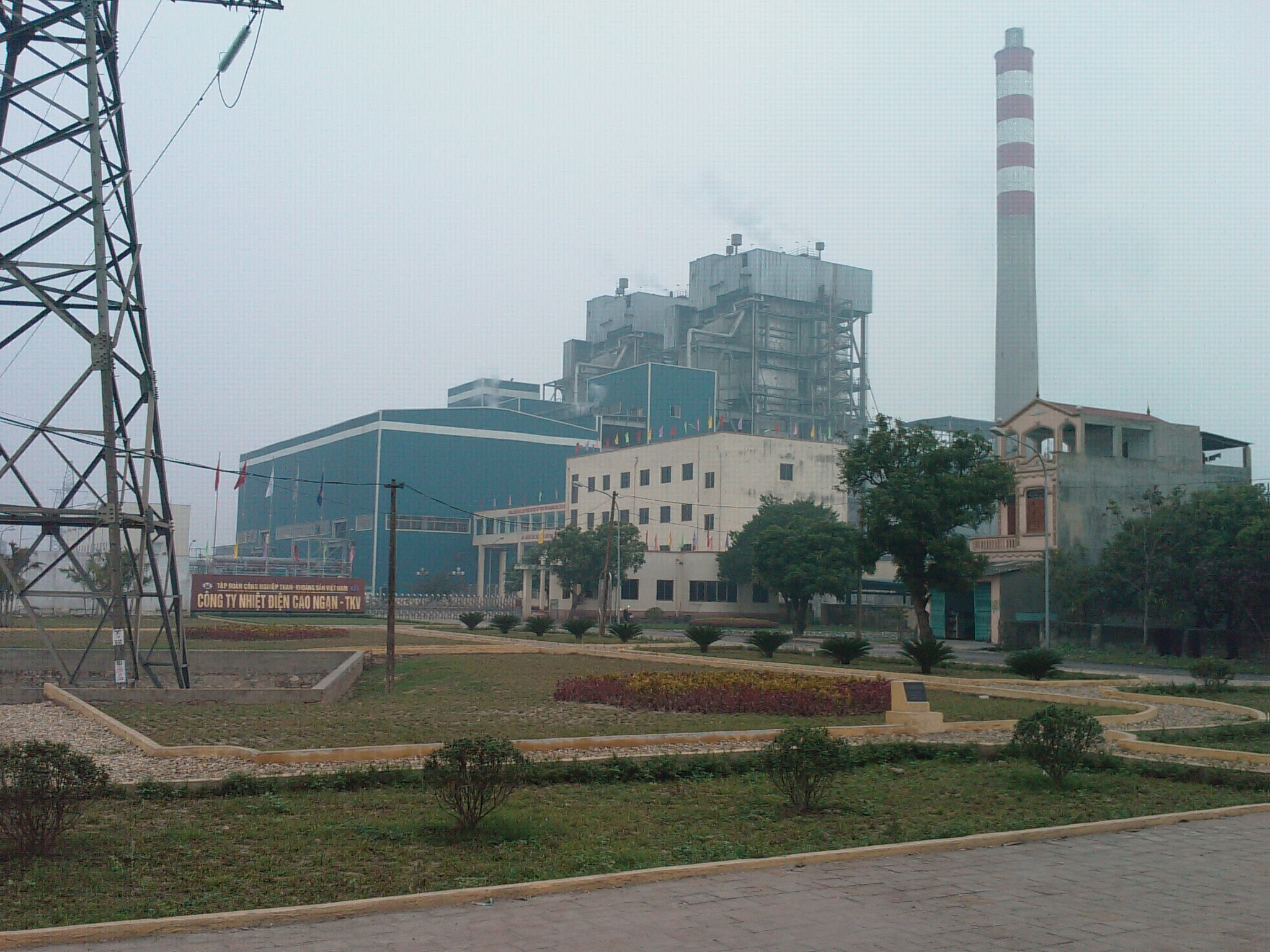
- Cao Ngạn Thermal Power Plant
- Interactive map of Quan Triều
- Country: Vietnam
- Regions: Northeast
- Province: Thái Nguyên Province
- Established: June 16, 2025

Area
  - Total: 24.72 km^{2} (9.54 sq mi)

Population (2025)
  - Total: 42,292
  - Density: 1,711/km^{2} (4,431/sq mi)
- Time zone: UTC+07:00 (Indochina Time)

Quan Triều is a ward (phường) of Thái Nguyên Province, Vietnam.

== Geography ==
Quan Triều Ward located in southern Thái Nguyên Province, and adjacent to:

- Đồng Hỷ Commune to the north
- Quyết Thắng Ward and Phan Đình Phùng Ward to the south
- Vô Tranh Commune and An Khánh Commune to the west
- Linh Sơn Ward to the east.

== History ==
On June 12, 2025, the National Assembly of Vietnam issued Resolution No. 202/2025/QH15 on the arrangement of provincial-level administrative units (effective from June 12, 2025). Accordingly, the entire land area and population of Bắc Kạn Province and Thái Nguyên Province were merged to form a new province named Thái Nguyên Province.

On June 16, 2025, the Standing Committee of the National Assembly of Vietnam issued Resolution No. 1683/NQ-UBTVQH15 on the arrangement of commune-level administrative units of Thái Nguyên Province in 2025 (effective from June 16, 2025). Accordingly, the entire land area and population of Tân Long, Quang Vinh, Quan Triều Wards and Sơn Cẩm Commune were merged to form a new ward named Quan Triều Ward.
