= Phúc Thuận =

Phúc Thuận Phường Phúc Thuận
- Ward
- Interactive map of Phúc Thuận
- Country: Vietnam
- Regions: Northeast
- Province: Thái Nguyên Province
- Established: June 16, 2025

Area
  - Total: 74.16 km^{2} (28.63 sq mi)

Population (2025)
  - Total: 29,051
  - Density: 391.7/km^{2} (1,015/sq mi)
- Time zone: UTC+07:00 (Indochina Time)

Phúc Thuận is a ward (phường) of Thái Nguyên Province, Vietnam.

== Geography ==
Phúc Thuận Ward located in southern Thái Nguyên Province, and adjacent to:

- Đại Phúc Commune and Tân Cương Commune to the north
- Thành Công Commune to the south
- Quân Chu Commune and Phú Thọ Province to the west
- Bá Xuyên Ward, Sông Công Ward and Phổ Yên Ward to the east.

== History ==
On June 12, 2025, the National Assembly of Vietnam issued Resolution No. 202/2025/QH15 on the arrangement of provincial-level administrative units (effective from June 12, 2025). Accordingly, the entire land area and population of Bắc Kạn Province and Thái Nguyên Province were merged to form a new province named Thái Nguyên Province.

On June 16, 2025, the Standing Committee of the National Assembly of Vietnam issued Resolution No. 1683/NQ-UBTVQH15 on the arrangement of commune-level administrative units of Thái Nguyên Province in 2025 (effective from June 16, 2025). Accordingly, the entire land area and population of Bắc Sơn Ward, Minh Đức Commune and Phúc Thuận Commune were merged to form a new ward named Phúc Thuận Ward.
