= Phú Lương district =

Phú Lương District Huyện Phú Lương
- District
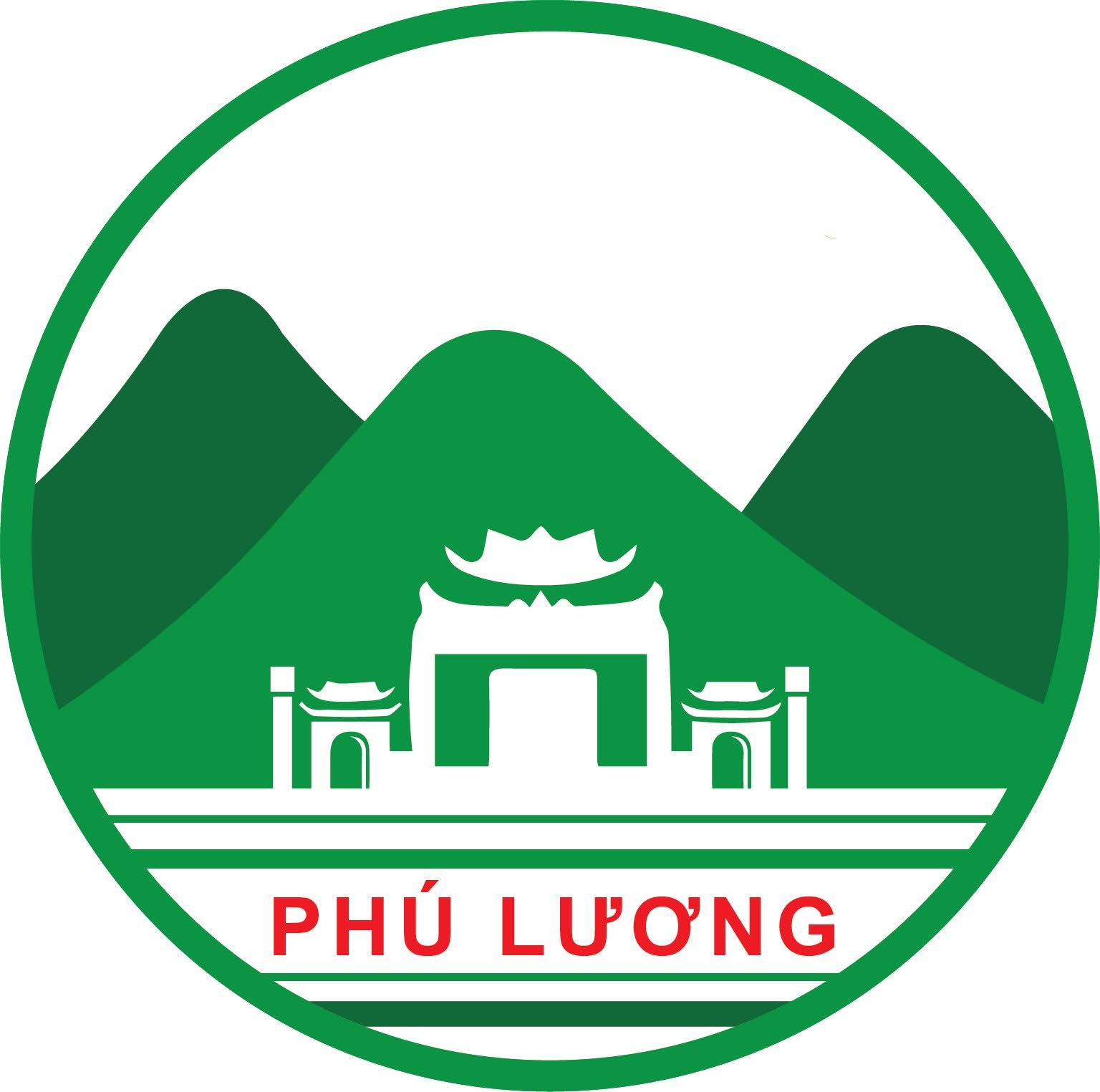
- Seal
- Interactive map of Phú Lương District
- Location within Vietnam
- Coordinates: 21°45′57″N 105°43′22″E
- Country: Vietnam
- Region: Northeast
- Province: Thái Nguyên
- Capital: Đu

Area
  - Total: 135.41 sq mi (350.72 km^{2})

Population (2017)
  - Total: 94,203
- Time zone: UTC+7 (UTC + 7)

Phú Lương was a rural district of Thái Nguyên province in the Northeast region of Vietnam. As of 2003, the district had a population of 106,834. The district covers an area of 369 km^{2}. The district capital lies at Đu.

== Administrative divisions ==
After 1996, Phú Lương had 3 towns: Đu, Chợ Mới, Giang Tiên and 23 communes: Bình Văn, Cổ Lũng, Động Đạt, Hợp Thành, Như Cố, Nông Hạ, Nông Thịnh, Ôn Lương, Phấn Mễ, Phú Đô, Phủ Lý, Quảng Chu, Sơn Cẩm, Thanh Đình, Tức Tranh, Vô Tranh, Yên Cư, Yên Đĩnh, Yên Đổ, Yên Hân, Yên Lạc, Yên Ninh, Yên Trạch.

Before Nghị quyết số 1683/NQ-UBTVQH15, Phú Lương had 2 towns and 14 communes: Đu, Giang Tiên, Cổ Lũng, Động Đạt, Hợp Thành, Ôn Lương, Phú Đô, Phủ Lý, Tức Tranh, Vô Tranh, Yên Đổ, Yên Lạc, Yên Ninh, Yên Trạch.

== Geography ==
Phú Lương district bordered:

- Đồng Hỷ to the east
- Đại Từ and Định Hóa commune to the west
- Thái Nguyên to the south
- Chợ Mới and Bắc Kạn to the north

== History ==
On January 1st, 1997, Thái Nguyên was established from Bắc Thái province, transferred 9 communes and 1 town, Yên Hân, Yên Cư, Như Cố, Bình Văn, Quản Chu, Yên Đĩnh, Thanh Bình, Nông Hạ, Nông Thịnh and Chợ Mới town was transferred to Bạch Thông district, Bắc Kạn

On December 13, 2013, Đu was expanded by incorporating 339,77 ha of Động Đạt and 388,08 ha of Phấn Mễ.

On August 18th, 2017, Sơn Cẩm commune was transferred to Thái Nguyên city under Nghị quyết số 422/NQ-UBTVQH14.

On December 1st, 2024, Phấn Mễ was dissolved, the areas was integrated into Đu and Giang Tiên under Nghị quyết số 1240/NQ-UBTVQH15.

On June, 2025. the Standing Committee of the National Assembly of Vietnam passed Nghị quyết số 1683/NQ-UBTVQH15. In which,

- Đu, Giang Tiên, Yên Lạc and Động Đạt merged into Phú Lương commune
- Tức Tranh, Cổ Lũng, Phú Đô and Vô Tranh merged into Vô Tranh commune
- Yên Trạch, Yên Ninh, and Yên Đổ merged into Yên Trạch commune
- Ôn Lương, Phủ Lý and Hợp Thành merged into Hợp Thành commune
