= An Khánh =

An Khánh may refer to several places in Vietnam, including:

- An Khánh, Ho Chi Minh City: a ward in the former Thủ Đức city (previously District 2)
- An Khanh, Hanoi: a commune in the former Hoài Đức district
- An Khánh, Haiphong: a commune in the former An Lão district
- An Khánh, Thái Nguyên: a commune in the former Đại Từ district
