= Gia Sàng =

Gia Sàng Phường Gia Sàng
- Ward
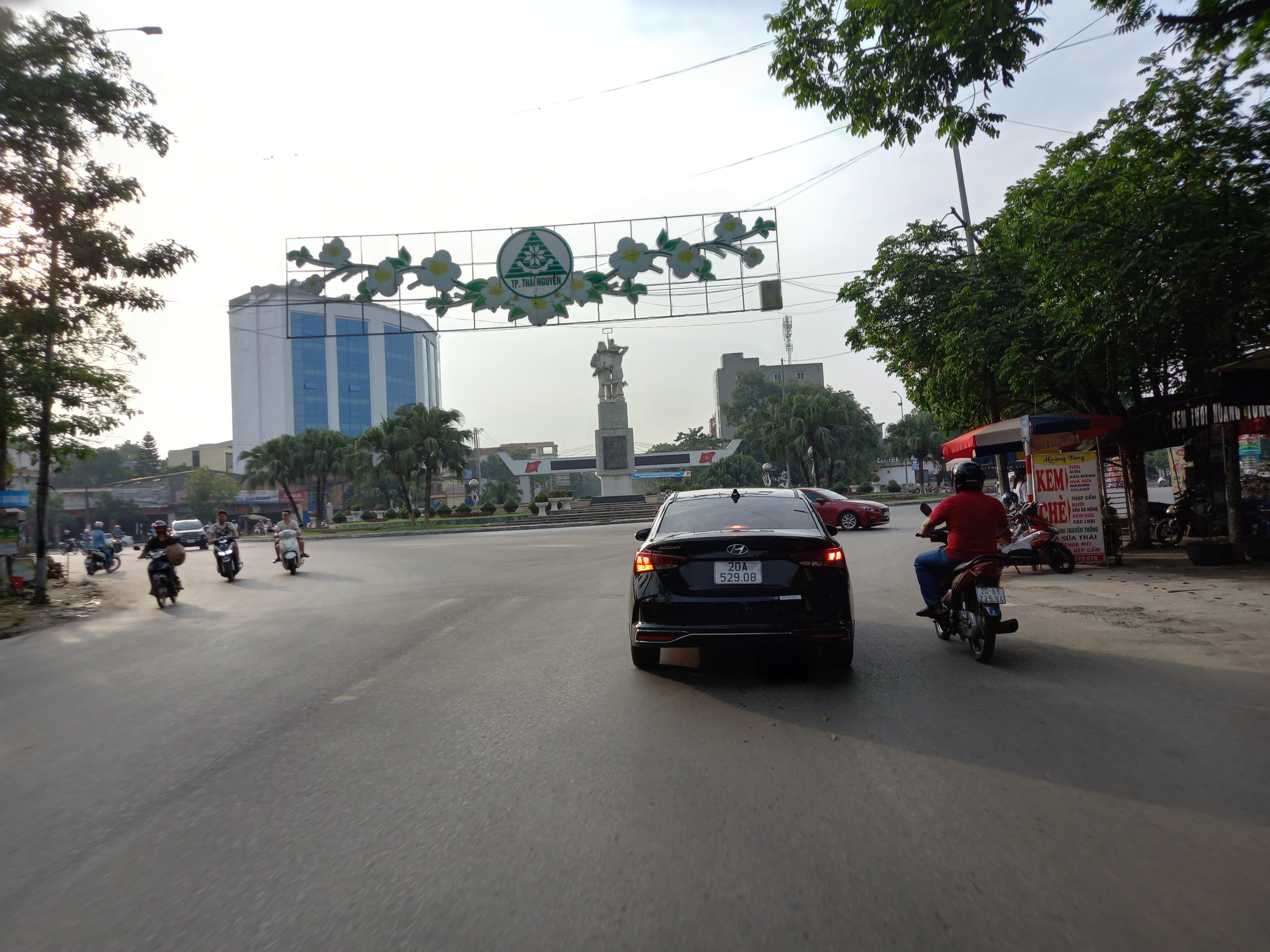
- Gang Thép Roundabout
- Interactive map of Gia Sàng
- Location in Vietnam
- Country: Vietnam
- Regions: Northeast
- Province: Thái Nguyên Province
- Established: June 16, 2025

Area
  - Total: 25.47 km^{2} (9.83 sq mi)

Population (2025)
  - Total: 44,094
  - Density: 1,731/km^{2} (4,484/sq mi)
- Time zone: UTC+07:00 (Indochina Time)

Gia Sàng is a ward (phường) of Thái Nguyên Province, Vietnam.

== Geography ==
Gia Sàng Ward is located in southern Thái Nguyên Province and borders:

- Phan Đình Phùng Ward, Linh Sơn Ward and Nam Hòa Commune to the north
- Bách Quang Ward to the south
- Tích Lương Ward to the west
- Tân Khánh Commune to the east.

== History ==
On June 12, 2025, the National Assembly of Vietnam issued Resolution No. 202/2025/QH15 on the arrangement of provincial-level administrative units (effective from June 12, 2025). Accordingly, the entire land area and population of Bắc Kạn Province and Thái Nguyên Province were merged to form a new province named Thái Nguyên Province.

On June 16, 2025, the Standing Committee of the National Assembly of Vietnam issued Resolution No. 1683/NQ-UBTVQH15 on the arrangement of commune-level administrative units of Thái Nguyên Province in 2025 (effective from June 16, 2025). Accordingly, the entire land area and population of Hương Sơn Ward, Đồng Liên Commune and the remaining part of Gia Sàng Ward, Cam Giá Ward after being arranged were merged to form a new ward named Gia Sàng Ward.
