= Bách Quang =

Bách Quang Phường Bách Quang
- Ward
- Sông Công I Industrial Park
- Interactive map of Bách Quang
- Country: Vietnam
- Regions: Northeast
- Province: Thái Nguyên Province
- Established: June 16, 2025

Area
  - Total: 35.02 km^{2} (13.52 sq mi)

Population (2025)
  - Total: 26,668
  - Density: 761.5/km^{2} (1,972/sq mi)
- Time zone: UTC+07:00 (Indochina Time)

Bách Quang is a ward (phường) of Thái Nguyên Province, Vietnam.

== Geography ==
Bách Quang Ward located in southern Thái Nguyên Province, and adjacent to:

- Tích Lương Ward and Gia Sàng Ward to the north
- Phổ Yên Ward and Sông Công Ward to the south
- Bá Xuyên Ward and Tân Cương Commune to the west
- Tân Khánh Commune and Điềm Thụy Commune to the east.

== History ==
On June 12, 2025, the National Assembly of Vietnam issued Resolution No. 202/2025/QH15 on the arrangement of provincial-level administrative units (effective from June 12, 2025). Accordingly, the entire land area and population of Bắc Kạn Province and Thái Nguyên Province were merged to form a new province named Thái Nguyên Province.

On June 16, 2025, the Standing Committee of the National Assembly of Vietnam issued Resolution No. 1683/NQ-UBTVQH15 on the arrangement of commune-level administrative units of Thái Nguyên Province in 2025 (effective from June 16, 2025). Accordingly, the entire land area and population of Lương Sơn Ward, Bách Quang Ward and Tân Quang Commune were merged to form a new ward named Bách Quang Ward.
