= Bá Xuyên =

Ward in Northeast, Vietnam

Bá Xuyên Phường Bá Xuyên
- Ward
- Bá Xuyên Roundabout
- Interactive map of Bá Xuyên
- Country: Vietnam
- Regions: Northeast
- Province: Thái Nguyên Province
- Established: June 16, 2025

Area
  - Total: 21.13 km^{2} (8.16 sq mi)

Population (2025)
  - Total: 20,065
  - Density: 949.6/km^{2} (2,459/sq mi)
- Time zone: UTC+07:00 (Indochina Time)

Bá Xuyên is a ward (phường) of Thái Nguyên Province, Vietnam.

== Geography ==
Bá Xuyên Ward located in southern Thái Nguyên Province, and adjacent to:

- Bách Quang Ward and Tân Cương Commune to the north
- Phúc Thuận Ward and Sông Công Ward to the south
- Tân Cương Commune to the west
- Bách Quang Ward to the east.

== History ==
On June 12, 2025, the National Assembly of Vietnam issued Resolution No. 202/2025/QH15 on the arrangement of provincial-level administrative units (effective from June 12, 2025). Accordingly, the entire land area and population of Bắc Kạn Province and Thái Nguyên Province were merged to form a new province named Thái Nguyên Province.

On June 16, 2025, the Standing Committee of the National Assembly of Vietnam issued Resolution No. 1683/NQ-UBTVQH15 on the arrangement of commune-level administrative units of Thái Nguyên Province in 2025 (effective from June 16, 2025). Accordingly, the entire land area and population of Mỏ Chè Ward, Châu Sơn Ward and Bá Xuyên Commune were merged to form a new ward named Bá Xuyên Ward.
