= Phan Đình Phùng (ward) =

Phan Đình Phùng Phường Phan Đình Phùng
- Ward
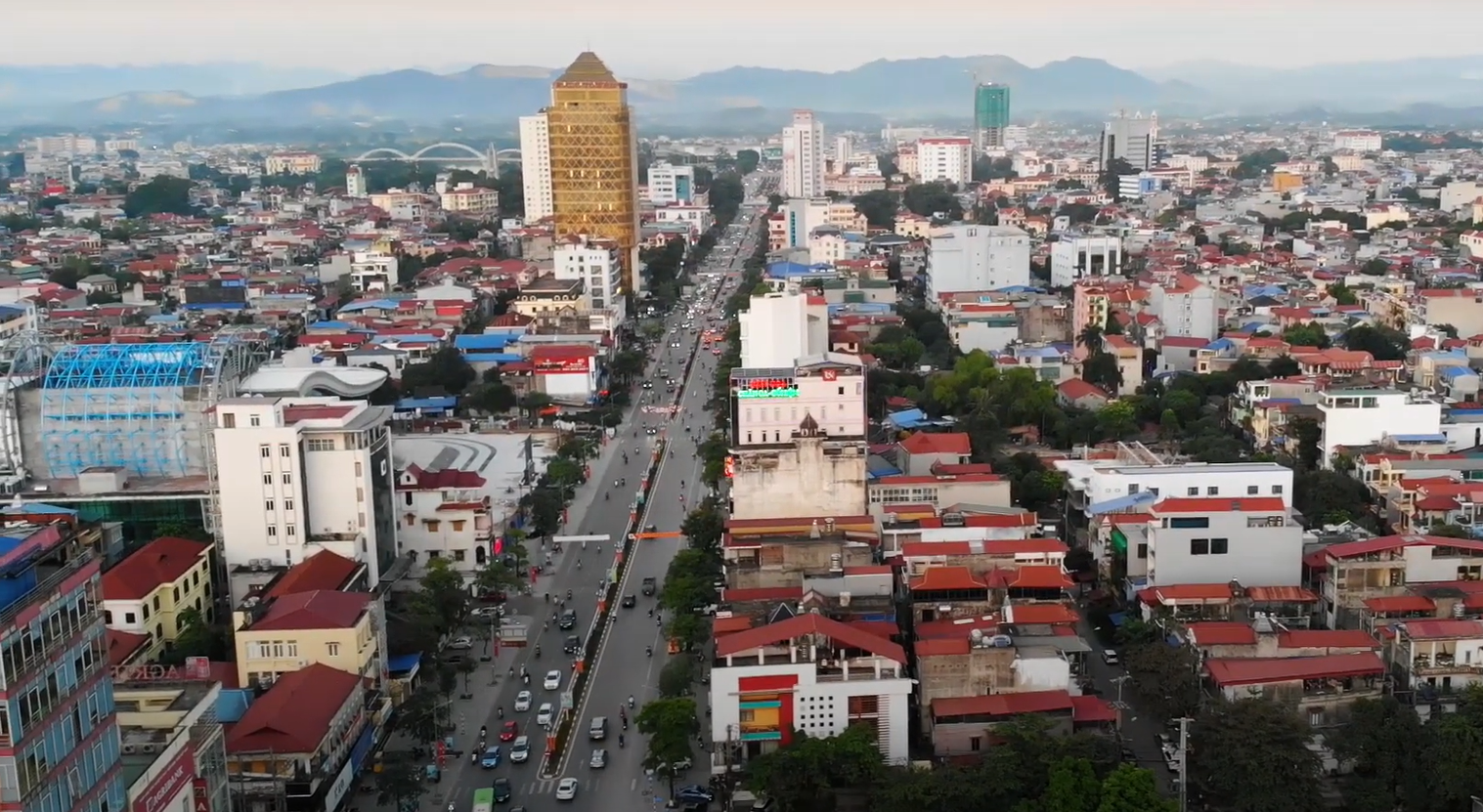
- Hoàng Văn Thụ Street
- Interactive map of Phan Đình Phùng
- Location in Vietnam
- Country: Vietnam
- Regions: Northeast
- Province: Thái Nguyên Province
- Established: June 16, 2025

Area
  - Total: 14.73 km^{2} (5.69 sq mi)

Population (2025)
  - Total: 111,482
  - Density: 7,568/km^{2} (19,600/sq mi)
- Time zone: UTC+07:00 (Indochina Time)

Phan Đình Phùng is a ward (phường) of Thái Nguyên Province, Vietnam. It is the capital of Thái Nguyên Province.

== Geography ==
Phan Đình Phùng Ward located in southern Thái Nguyên Province, and adjacent to:

- Linh Sơn Ward and Quan Triều Ward to the north
- Gia Sàng Ward and Tích Lương Ward to the south
- Quyết Thắng Ward to the west
- Linh Sơn Ward to the east.

== History ==
On June 12, 2025, the National Assembly of Vietnam issued Resolution No. 202/2025/QH15 on the arrangement of provincial-level administrative units (effective from June 12, 2025). Accordingly, the entire land area and population of Bắc Kạn Province and Thái Nguyên Province were merged to form a new province named Thái Nguyên Province.

On June 16, 2025, the Standing Committee of the National Assembly of Vietnam issued Resolution No. 1683/NQ-UBTVQH15 on the arrangement of commune-level administrative units of Thái Nguyên Province in 2025 (effective from June 16, 2025). Accordingly, the entire land area and population of Trưng Vương, Túc Duyên, Đồng Quang, Quang Trung, Hoàng Văn Thụ, Tân Thịnh, Phan Đình Phùng Wards, and part of Gia Sàng Ward were merged to form a new ward named Phan Đình Phùng Ward.
