= Quyết Thắng =

Quyết Thắng may refer to:

== Places ==
- Quyết Thắng, Thái Nguyên, a ward of Thái Nguyên province
- Quyết Thắng, Haiphong, a commune of Haiphong city
- Quyết Thắng, Phú Thọ, a commune of Phú Thọ province

== Military ==
- Operation Quyet Thang 202, a 1964 operation in the Vietnam War
- Operation Quyet Thang, a 1968 security operation in the Vietnam War in the aftermath of the Tet Offensive
- 1st Corps (Vietnam), also called Quyết thắng Corps (1973-2023), a People's Army of Vietnam army corps
