= Quyết Thắng, Thái Nguyên =

Ward in Thái Nguyên province, Vietnam

Quyết Thắng Phường Quyết Thắng
- Ward
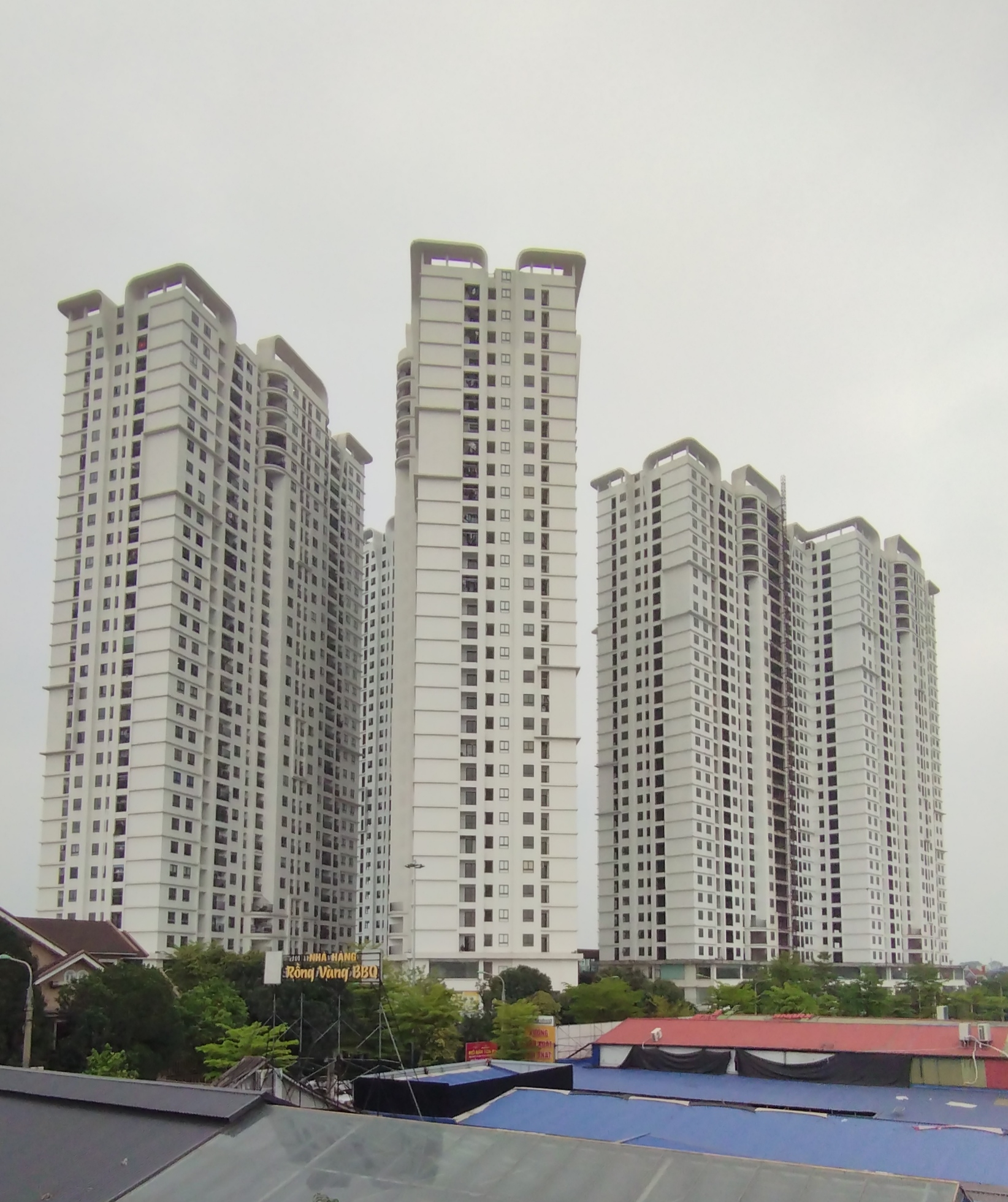
- Tecco Elite City Thái Nguyên
- Interactive map of Quyết Thắng
- Location in Vietnam
- Country: Vietnam
- Regions: Northeast
- Province: Thái Nguyên Province
- Established: June 16, 2025

Area
  - Total: 24.43 km^{2} (9.43 sq mi)

Population (2025)
  - Total: 29,933
  - Density: 1,225/km^{2} (3,173/sq mi)
- Time zone: UTC+07:00 (Indochina Time)

Quyết Thắng is a ward (phường) of Thái Nguyên Province, Vietnam.

== Geography ==
Quyết Thắng Ward located in southern Thái Nguyên Province, and adjacent to:

- Quan Triều Ward to the north
- Tân Cương Commune to the south
- An Khánh Commune and Đại Phúc Commune and to the west
- Phan Đình Phùng Ward and Tích Lương Ward to the east.

== History ==
On June 12, 2025, the National Assembly of Vietnam issued Resolution No. 202/2025/QH15 on the arrangement of provincial-level administrative units (effective from June 12, 2025). Accordingly, the entire land area and population of Bắc Kạn Province and Thái Nguyên Province were merged to form a new province named Thái Nguyên Province.

On June 16, 2025, the Standing Committee of the National Assembly of Vietnam issued Resolution No. 1683/NQ-UBTVQH15 on the arrangement of commune-level administrative units of Thái Nguyên Province in 2025 (effective from June 16, 2025). Accordingly, the entire land area and population of Thịnh Đán Ward, Phúc Hà Commune and Quyết Thắng Commune were merged to form a new ward named Quyết Thắng Ward.
