= Hanoi Metro =

Metro system in Hanoi, Vietnam

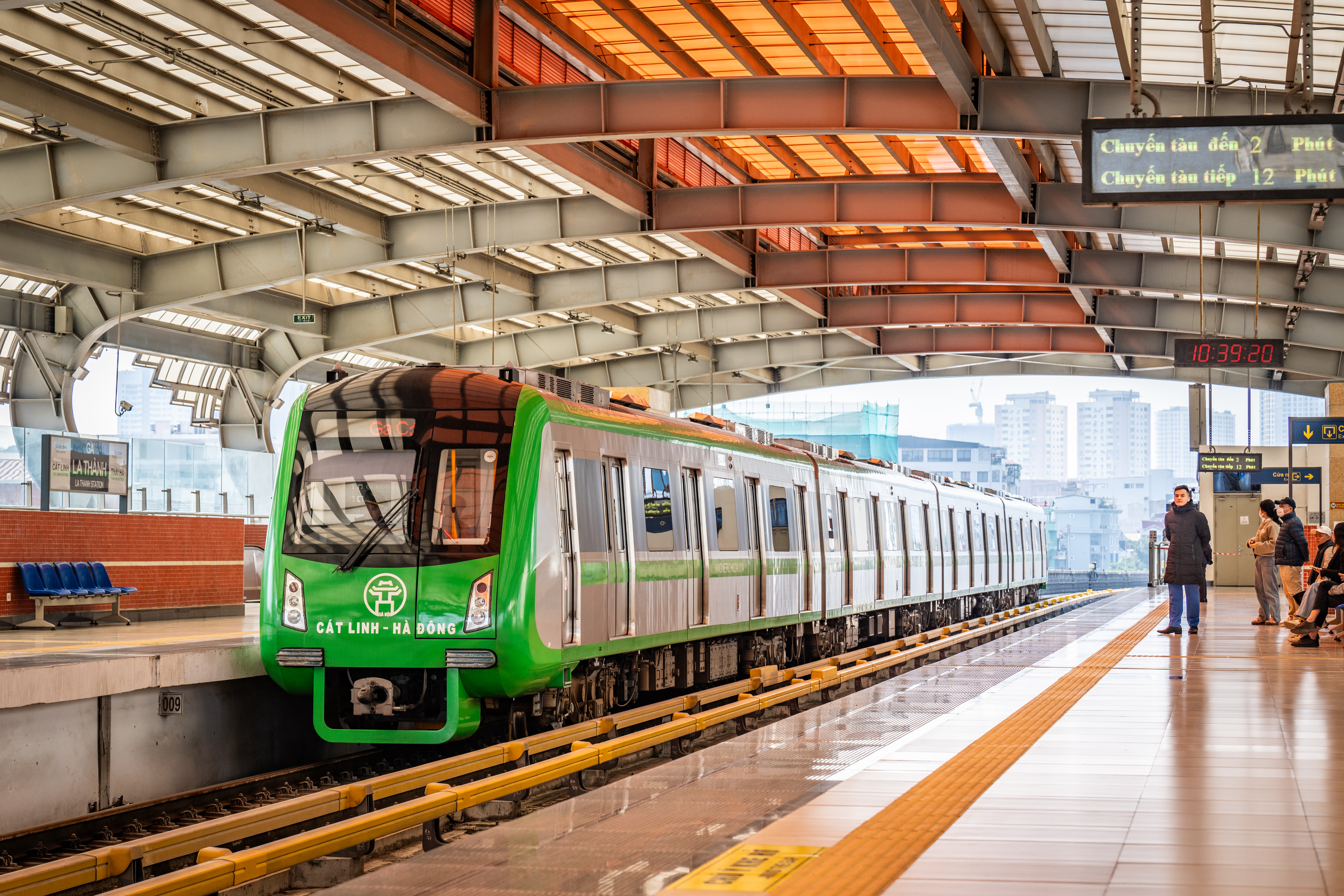
- A Line 2A train at La Thanh station

- Diagram of future provisions

Overview
- Native name: Đường sắt đô thị Hà Nội
- Owner: Hanoi People’s Committee
- Locale: Hanoi, Vietnam
- Transit type: Rapid transit
- Number of lines: 2 (in operation); 7 (under construction)
- Number of stations: 20 (in operation); 34 (under construction)
- Daily ridership: 31,759
- Annual ridership: 20.65 million (2025)
- Website: hanoimetro.net.vn/en

Operation
- Began operation: 6 November 2021; 5 years ago
- Operators: Hanoi Metro Company and Tokyo Metro
- Number of vehicles: 23 four-car trainset
- Headway: 10 minutes

Technical
- System length: 21.6 km (in operation); 358.4 km (under construction); 979 km (planned)
- Track gauge: 1,435 mm (4 ft 8 1/2 in) standard gauge
- Electrification: Third rail
- Top speed: 80 km/h (50 mph)
System map (Operational lines)
Operational lines

The Hanoi Metro (Vietnamese: Đường sắt đô thị Hà Nội, [ɗɯəŋ˨˩ ɕɐt̚˧˥ ɗo˧ tʰi˨˩ˀ ha˨˩ noi˨˩ˀ], lit. 'Hanoi urban railway') is a rapid transit system in Hanoi, the capital city of Vietnam. Owned by Hanoi's People Committee and operated by Hanoi Metro Company (HMC), it is the first operational rapid transit system in Vietnam. The system includes elevated and underground sections. The first line, Line 2A, opened to service on 6 November 2021. The first section of the second line Line 3 opened on 8 August 2024.

The system is projected to have 18 lines with a total length of 979 kilometres (608 mi) by 2045. Upon opening, daily ridership was at 12,000.

== History ==
=== Pre-planning ===
As the capital city of Vietnam, Hanoi's population is growing rapidly. As of 2010 (the year when construction started on the first line), Hanoi's population was around 6,910,000. Hoàn Kiếm District and Ba Đình District are the districts with the highest population density. The government expects the population of Hanoi to increase up to 8,000,000 by 2030. The growing population would affect the city's operation and development. To solve this issue, the Vietnamese government and the Hanoi People's Committee proposed to build an urban rail transit system, which was first proposed in the late 1990s.

In 1998, the Vietnamese government revised and agreed the “Hanoi Capital to 2020 Master Plan” which suggested that Hanoi prioritise the building of a rail transit system, with a target to build 5 lines. The "Overall Plan for the Development of Vietnam's Railway Transportation Industry to 2020", released in 2002, and the "2005-2010 Economic and Social Development Plan for 2006-2010", released in 2006, both suggested the same and aimed to finish the metro system by 2010.

=== Survey and approval ===
The start of construction was delayed continually as the government first required consultant companies from China, France and Japan, such as SYSTRA and Japan International Cooperation Agency, to finish feasibility studies which ran from 2004 to 2007. These three companies suggested the Hanoi government build a network consisting of 6 lines. In 2008, the Vietnamese government approved the construction of the suggested lines, which they divided into several phases.

=== Construction and opening ===
The pilot line of Hanoi Metro is Line 3. It began construction in 2009 with a projected completion date of 2015. The line was built by multiple companies, with train systems provided by Alstom. The railway line was built by South Korean firm Daelim Industrial and other contractors. The project was repeatedly delayed, with the completion date rescheduled to 2027. The elevated section of the line opened to the public on 8 August 2024, while the work on the underground section continued. Despite being the pilot line, Line 3 became the second operational Hanoi metro line, after Line 2A, due to the 9-year delay.

The second planned line, Line 2A, began construction in October 2011. The line was constructed by China Railway Engineering Corporation. The bulk of the construction was completed by the fourth quarter of 2018. Operational tests were conducted at the end of 2018 and again in 2019. After delays, Line 2A opened to the public on 6 November 2021, becoming the first operational metro line in Hanoi and Vietnam.

== Network ==
According to the Prime Minister's decision approving the transport development of Hanoi by 2030 and vision to 2050 (519/QD-TTg dated 31 March 2016), the Hanoi Metro system will consist of 8 lines, including elevated and underground sections. The Ministry of Transport (MoT) and the Hanoi People's Committee (HPC) will both be investors in the project. Phase 1 includes Line 2A and Line 3, Line 2A and Line 3 (elevated section) are in service, and Line 3 (underground section) is currently under construction.

Operational
Line	Route	Length	Stations	Depots	Operational date
Line 2A (Hanoi Metro)	Cat Linh ↔ Yen Nghia	13.1 km (8.1 mi)	12	Yên Nghĩa	6 November 2021
Route map
Line 3 (Hanoi Metro)	Nhon ↔ Cau Giay	8.5 km (5.3 mi)	8	Nhổn	8 August 2024

Under construction
Line	Route	Length	Stations	Depots	Operational date
Line 2 (Hanoi Metro)	Nam Thăng Long ↔ Trần Hưng Đạo	10.8 km (6.7 mi)	10	Xuân Đỉnh	2029
Line 3 (Hanoi Metro)	Cau Giay ↔ Ha Noi	4 km (2.5 mi); 12.5 km (7.8 mi) (planned)	4; 14 (planned)	Nhổn	2027
Line 5 (Hanoi Metro)	Văn Cao ↔ Hòa Lạc	39.58 km (24.6 mi)	20	Sơn Đồng Hòa Lạc	2030

=== Line 2A: Cat Linh - Ha Dong ===
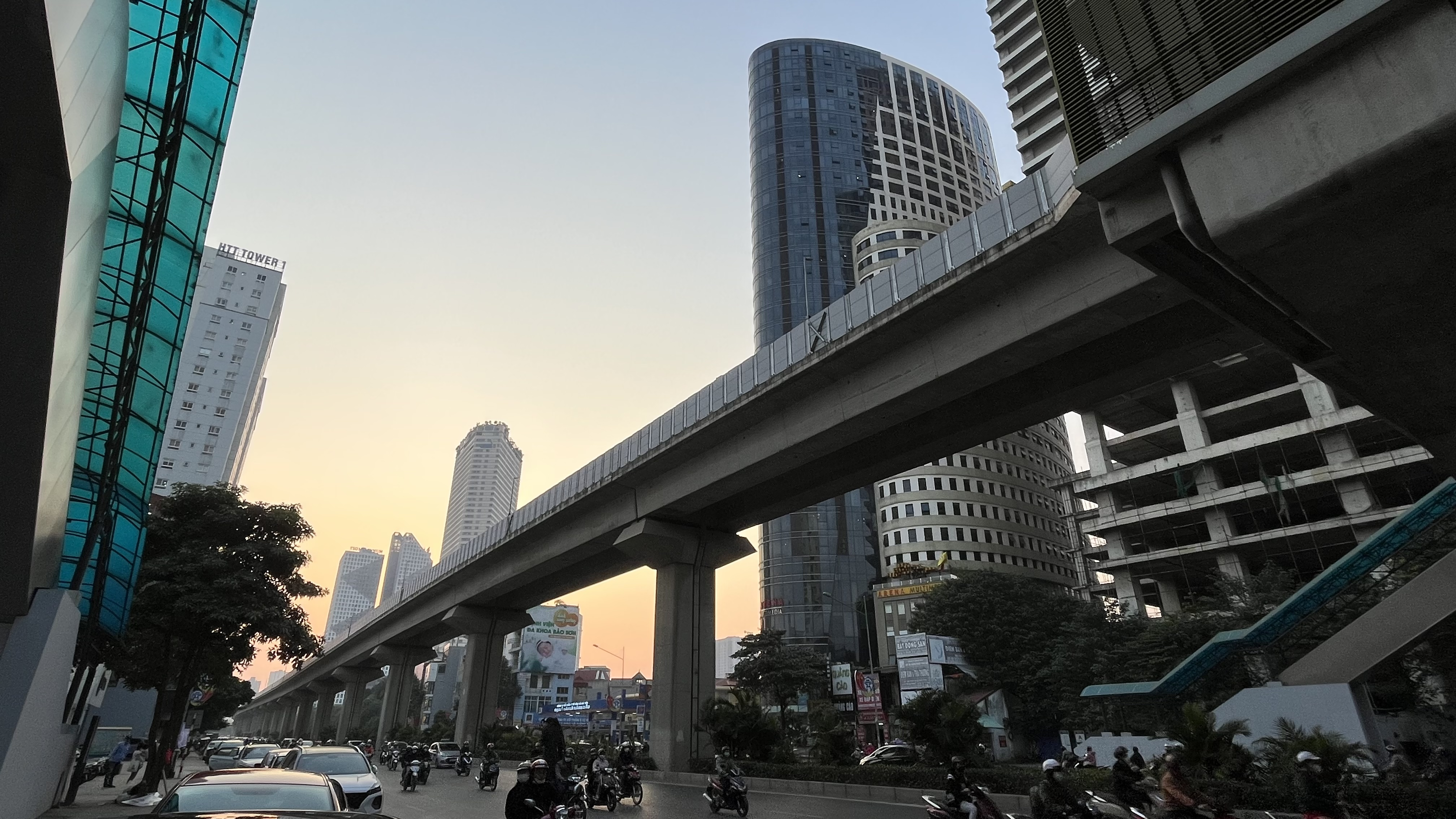
Line 2A over Tran Phu street, near Van Quan station

The 13.1 km (8.1 mi) line, consisting of 12 stations (all elevated), and connecting the districts Dong Da, Thanh Xuan and Ha Dong, will be the first operational line in the metro system. This line is constructed using Official Development Assistance (ODA) from China with a total investment of US$868 million. The China Railway Sixth Group is the EPC (Engineering, Procurement and Construction) contractor for the project, and the Ministry of Transport (Vietnam) is an investor.

The construction was started on 10 October 2011 and was initially targeted to begin operations in 2016. In 2016, it was announced that the completion date was to be pushed back to early 2018. However, due to funding and land acquisition issues, construction wasn't completed until September 2018. Following completion, the pilot run and testing was conducted from September to December 2018. Line 2A was scheduled to commence operations in February 2019, before the holidays of Lunar New Year, but was postponed for the sixth time as some station construction works remained incomplete. Transport Minister Nguyen Van The had hopes that operations would begin in April 2019.

On 30 April 2019, a representative from the Railway Project Management Board informed the press that the line was not yet operational, the reason stated being that the system had not yet been issued with a safety certificate and it had not been accepted by the State Acceptance Council. By the deadline of 30 April 2019, the General Chinese Contractor had not completed some stations, depot areas, escalator roofs for stations, drainage connections for Ring Road 3 Station, landscaping, trees, electricity and ticketing systems.

After multiple delays, the trial run was restarted on 28 October 2019, to last for 20 days. Beginning in December 2020, Line 2A underwent a full-scale test run in order to check its safety before approval for commercial service. Line 2A opened to the public on 6 November 2021.

=== Line 3: Nhon - Hanoi Station Section ===
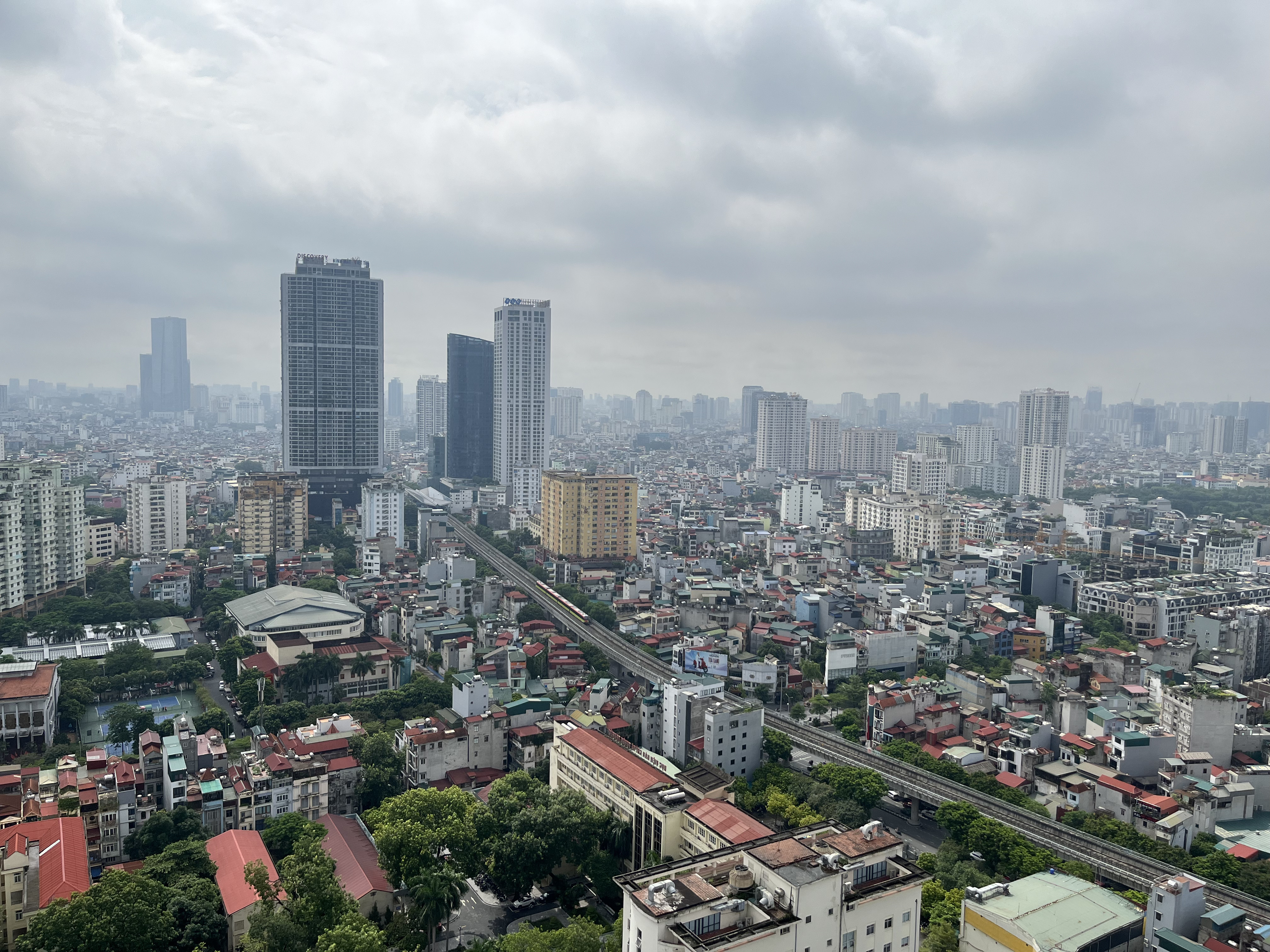
Line 3 passing over Xuan Thuy road, viewed from above

The Hanoi Metro Rail System Project (Line 3: Nhon - Hanoi Station section) is in line with the Prime Minister's decision approving the transport development of Hanoi by 2030 and vision to 2050 (519/QD-TTg dated 31 March 2016). The project has the Hanoi Metropolitan Railway Management Board, French government, Asian Development Bank, and European Investment Bank as the investors, and will be built in two phases. Phase 1 is 12.5 km (7.8 mi) long in total and consists of 12 stations, with 8.5 km (5.3 mi) elevated and 4 km (2.5 mi) underground, and will serve residents from districts such as Nam Tu Liem, Bac Tu Liem, Cau Giay, Ba Dinh, Dong Da, and Hoan Kiem.

Construction for Line 3 began in 2010 and was initially targeted to commence service in 2018. However, in 2017, it was announced that the construction would not be complete until 2021, and that the operation start was deferred to 2022. In July 2018, the Hanoi Metropolitan Railway Management Board (MRB) announced that only 43% of the work for Line 3 had been completed, and the launch date of elevated section would most likely be delayed until early 2023. However, in September 2022, the authorities requested to extend the deadline to 2025, and increase the budget by a further VND1.9 trillion ($80.77m USD). The line was further delayed in September 2022 when the authorities announced that they expected the line to fully open in 2027.

== Future plans ==
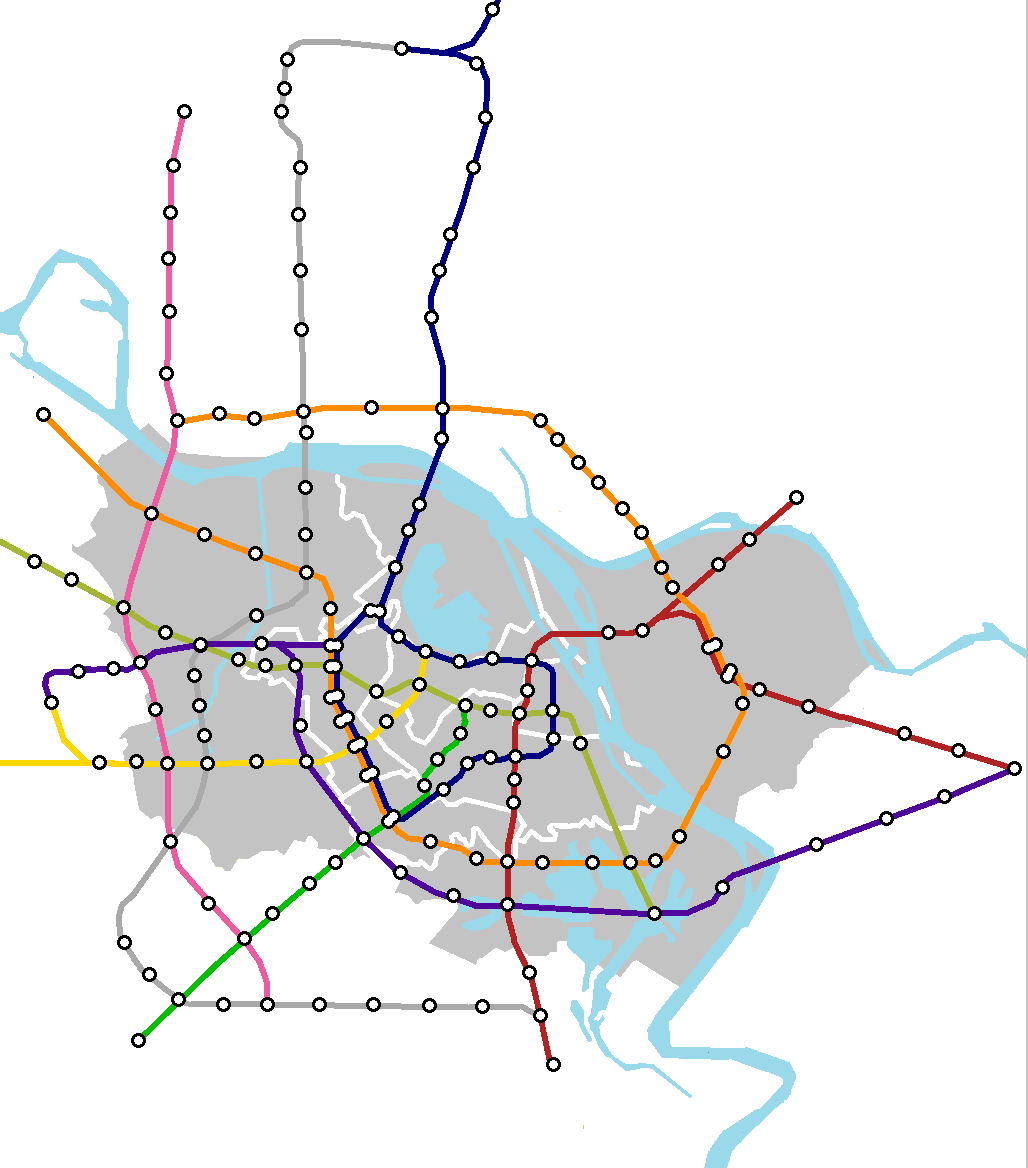

Planning and future lines
Line	Alternate name	Route	Length (km)	Status	Number of stations	Depots
Line 1 (Hanoi Metro)	Long Biên Line	Yên Viên ↔ Ngọc Hồi	26 km (16.2 mi)	pending budget approval (opens in 2030)	16	Yên Viên; Ngọc Hồi
Line 1 (Hanoi Metro)	Long Biên Line	Dương Xá ↔ Gia Lâm	10 km (6.2 mi)	initial planning	7	Dương Xá
Line 2 (Hanoi Metro)	Hoàn Kiếm Line	Noi Bai International Airport ↔ Nam Thăng Long	18 km (11.2 mi)	pending budget approval	—N/a	Xuân Đỉnh; Phủ Lỗ
Line 2 (Hanoi Metro)	Hoàn Kiếm Line	Trần Hưng Đạo ↔ Thuong Dinh	6 km (3.7 mi)	pending budget approval	6	Xuân Đỉnh; Phủ Lỗ
Line 2 (Hanoi Metro)	Hoàn Kiếm Line	Thuong Dinh ↔ Hoàng Quốc Việt	7 km (4.3 mi)	initial planning	—N/a	Xuân Đỉnh; Phủ Lỗ
Line 2A (Hanoi Metro)	Cát Linh Line	Yen Nghia ↔ Xuân Mai	...	initial planning	—N/a	—N/a
Line 3 (Hanoi Metro)	Văn Miếu Line	Trôi ↔ Nhổn	36 km (22.4 mi)	initial planning	—N/a	—N/a
Line 3 (Hanoi Metro)	Văn Miếu Line	Hanoi ↔ Yên Sở (Hoàng Mai)	8.8 km (5.5 mi)	pending budget approval	7	Yên Sở
Line 4 (Hanoi Metro)	Thăng Long Line	(circular line) Mê Linh ↔ Liên Hà	54 km (33.6 mi)	initial planning	41	Liên Hà; Đại Mạch
Line 6 (Hanoi Metro)	Nội Bài Line	Noi Bai Airport ↔ Ngọc Hồi	43 km (26.7 mi)	research planning	29	Ngọc Hồi; Kim Mỗ
Line 7 (Hanoi Metro)	Hà Đông Line	Mê Linh ↔ Dương Nội	28 km (17.4 mi)	initial planning	23	Mê Linh
Line 8 (Hanoi Metro)	Mỹ Đình Line	Sơn Đồng ↔ Mai Dịch ↔ Dương Xá	37 km (23.0 mi)	pending budget approval	26	Sơn Đồng; Cổ Bì
Line 9 (Hanoi Metro)	Sơn Tây Line	Sơn Tây ↔ Hoà Lạc ↔ Xuân Mai	—N/a	initial planning	—N/a	Sơn Tây; Xuân Mai
Hanoi Metro Monorail 1	—N/a	Liên Hà ↔ Tân Lập ↔ An Khánh	11 km (6.8 mi)	initial planning	—N/a	—N/a
Hanoi Metro Monorail 2	—N/a	Giáp Bát ↔ Thanh Liệt ↔ Phú Lương; Mai Dịch ↔ Mỹ Đình ↔ Văn Mỗ ↔ Phúc La	22 km (13.7 mi)	initial planning	—N/a	—N/a
Hanoi Metro Monorail 3	—N/a	Nam Hồng ↔ Mê Linh ↔ Đại Thịnh	11 km (6.8 mi)	initial planning	—N/a	—N/a

(Source: except for some numbers here)

=== Progress ===
Line 1 (Long Biên Line): Ngọc Hồi - Gia Lâm (Phase 1) (Yên Viên - Ngọc Hồi)

The Ngọc Hồi - Gia Lâm section of Metro Line 1 is 15.4 km (9.6 mi) long and elevated (including 8.9 km (5.5 mi) elevated, 1.7 km (1.1 mi) km bridge and 4.8 km (3.0 mi) on surface). The line has the Railway Project Management Unit (RPMU) as its investor and Ministry of Transport as project owner. Its budget is from Japanese ODA. Currently it is in the detailed design phase. Furthermore, Ministry of Transportation has reported to National Assembly that the ministry has transferred the railway section from Yên Viên to Ngọc Hồi including Hà Nội railway station and Giáp Bát railway station to Hanoi People's Committee to implement Hanoi urban railway line (AKA Long Biên line) to feed the future North-South High Speed train since there will be a construction of the Northern terminus (AKA the Hà Nội High Speed train station which will be functioned as the new Hà Nội railway station) of North-South High Speed train at Ngọc Hồi on 151 hectares of land. The line will be completed in 3 phases:

- Phase 1: Ngọc Hồi - Hà Nội railway station - Gia Lâm (15.4 km (9.6 mi))
- Phase 2: Gia Lâm - Yên Viên (13.3 km)
- Phase 3: Gia Lâm - Dương Xá (10 km)

The first 2 phases of Line 1 will have 16 stations: Yên Viên, Cầu Đuống, Đức Giang, Gia Lâm, Long Biên North, Long Biên South, Phùng Hưng, Hanoi, Thống Nhất Park, Bạch Mai, Phương Liệt, Giáp Bát, Hoàng Liệt, Văn Điển, Vĩnh Quỳnh, Ngọc Hồi

Line 2 (Hoan Kiem Line): Nam Thăng Long - Trần Hưng Đạo (Phase 1) (Noi Bai Airport - Nam Thăng Long - Trần Hưng Đạo - Thuong Dinh - Hoàng Quốc Việt)

This section is 42 km in length, connecting Noi Bai Airport with the city center. There will be 32 stations and 2 depots. The 4 phases of the project are:

- Phase 1: Nam Thăng Long - Trần Hưng Đạo: 11.5 km long, of which 8.9 km are underground and 2.6 km are elevated. It consists of 10 stations including 7 underground, 3 elevated and 1 depot. The project owner is Hanoi Metropolitan Railway Management Board. The project will be funded by Japanese ODA. At present cost estimate is pending to be approved.
  This phase will have 10 stations: Nam Thăng Long, Ngoại Giao Đoàn, Tây Hồ Tây, Bưởi, Quần Ngựa, Bách Thảo, Hồ Tây, Hàng Đậu, Hoàn Kiếm Lake, Trần Hưng Đạo
- Phase 2: Trần Hưng Đạo - Thuong Dinh: 5.9 km long, fully underground and now is at feasibility study phase.
  This phase will have 6 other stations after Trần Hưng Đạo: Cầu Dền, Bách Khoa, Kim Liên, Chùa Bộc, Ngã Tư Sở, Thuong Dinh.
- Phase 3: Thuong Dinh - Ring road 2.5 - Hoàng Quốc Việt
- Phase 4: Nội Bài Airport - Nam Thang Long: 12.5 km long

Line 4 (Thang Long Line): Me Linh - Dong Anh - Hoang Mai - Ring road 2.5 - Co Nhue - Lien Ha

Line 4 is the longest out of 8 lines, with 41 stations and 2 depots. It will work as a loop line that takes into account connections with lines 1, 2A, 3, 5, 6 and 7.

Line 5 (Kim Ma Line): South West Lake - Hoa Lac - Ba Vi (Văn Cao - Hòa Lạc)

In 2012, the project was expected to start in 2017 but the commencement date has now been postponed. It will be 38.4 km long with 17 stations and 2 depots. Right now feasibility study is carried out by the Japan International Cooperation Agency (JICA). Its project owner is the Hanoi Metropolitan Railway Management Board. 2 phases are:

- Phase 1: South West Lake - An Khanh: 14.1 km with 10 stations
- Phase 2: An Khanh - Ba Vi: 24.1 km with 7 stations

On 25 December 2025, the consortium composed of 3 subsidiary entities of Shenzhen Metro Group: "Shenzhen Municipal Design and Research Institute Co., Ltd., Shenzhen Metro International Investment Consulting Co., Ltd. and Shenzhen Building Materials Trading Group Co., Ltd.", Pacific Construction Group and other units successful bid and won the construction project of Line 5. In this winning project, the three subsidiaries of Shenzhen Metro Group undertook a number of core tasks, covering key links such as planning and design, equipment technical services, joint commissioning and testing, and operation training, with a total service contract amount of 886 million RMB (129 million USD). Total investment of Line 5 is 19.2 billion RMB (2.76 billion USD).

Line 6 (Noi Bai Line): Noi Bai Airport - Phu Dien - Ha Dong - Ngoc Hoi

Line 6's total length is 43 km (27 mi) with 29 stations and 2 depots. The route runs mainly on the current national track system, connecting the southern districts to the northern ones and Noi Bai airport (T2 terminal).

Line 7 (Ha Dong Line): Me Linh - Nhon - Van Canh - Duong Noi

Line 7 is 27.6 km long with 23 stations and 1 depot at Me Linh. The route runs in the north to the south, connecting Me Linh urban area to urban area series in the midst of ring roads 3 and 4 and downtown in the west of Hanoi.

Line 8 (My Dinh Line): Son Dong - Mai Dich - Linh Nam - Duong Xa

Line 8 is 37.4 km (23.2 mi) long with 26 stations and 2 depots. The underground section is from Mai Dich to Linh Nam, and elevated sections are 2 parts: Son Dong to Mai Dich and Linh Nam to Duong Xa.

== Rolling stock ==
=== Line 2A: CRRC trains ===
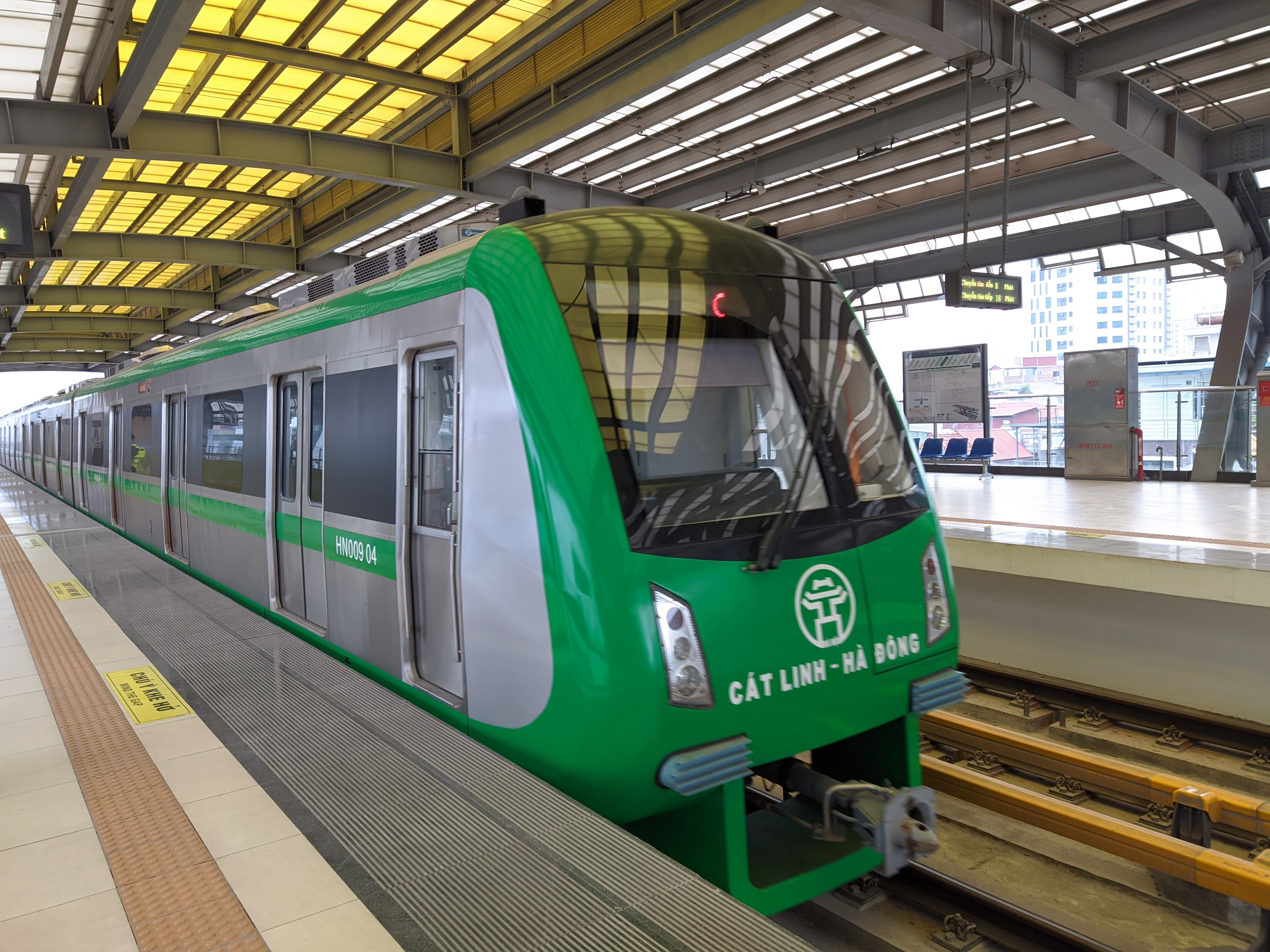
A Line 2A train at Vanh Dai 3 station

On 20 October 2015, the Railway Project Management Unit (RPMU) organized the Cat Linh - Ha Dong sample train exhibition at Giang Vo Exhibition Center, Ba Dinh District. The decision was made to use Chinese rolling stock manufacturer CRRC Corporation Limited (CRRC) trains, made by Beijing Subway Rolling Stock Equipment, to supply the rolling stock for Line 2A.

Each train will consist of 4 carriages, with capacity for over 1,200 passengers. Each carriage weighs around 35 tonnes (34 long tons; 39 short tons), is 19 metres (62 ft 4.0 in) long, 3.8 metres (12 ft 5.6 in) high, and 2.8 metres (9 ft 2 in) wide. The first train arrived in Hanoi in March 2017 via the port of Hai Phong. The CRRC supplied a total of 13 four-car train-sets in 2018, which are all currently stabled at a depot at Phu Luong, east of Yen Nghia. Trains are powered by a 750 V third rail, a first for Vietnam.

The trains' exteriors are painted green, and the seal of the Hanoi Temple of Literature, which is the symbol Khue Van of Hanoi, is shown on the front of the train, and the line name “Cat Linh - Ha Dong” is displayed along the bottom in white. A small LED screen is place at the left top corner to show the name of the line.

=== Line 3: Alstom trains ===
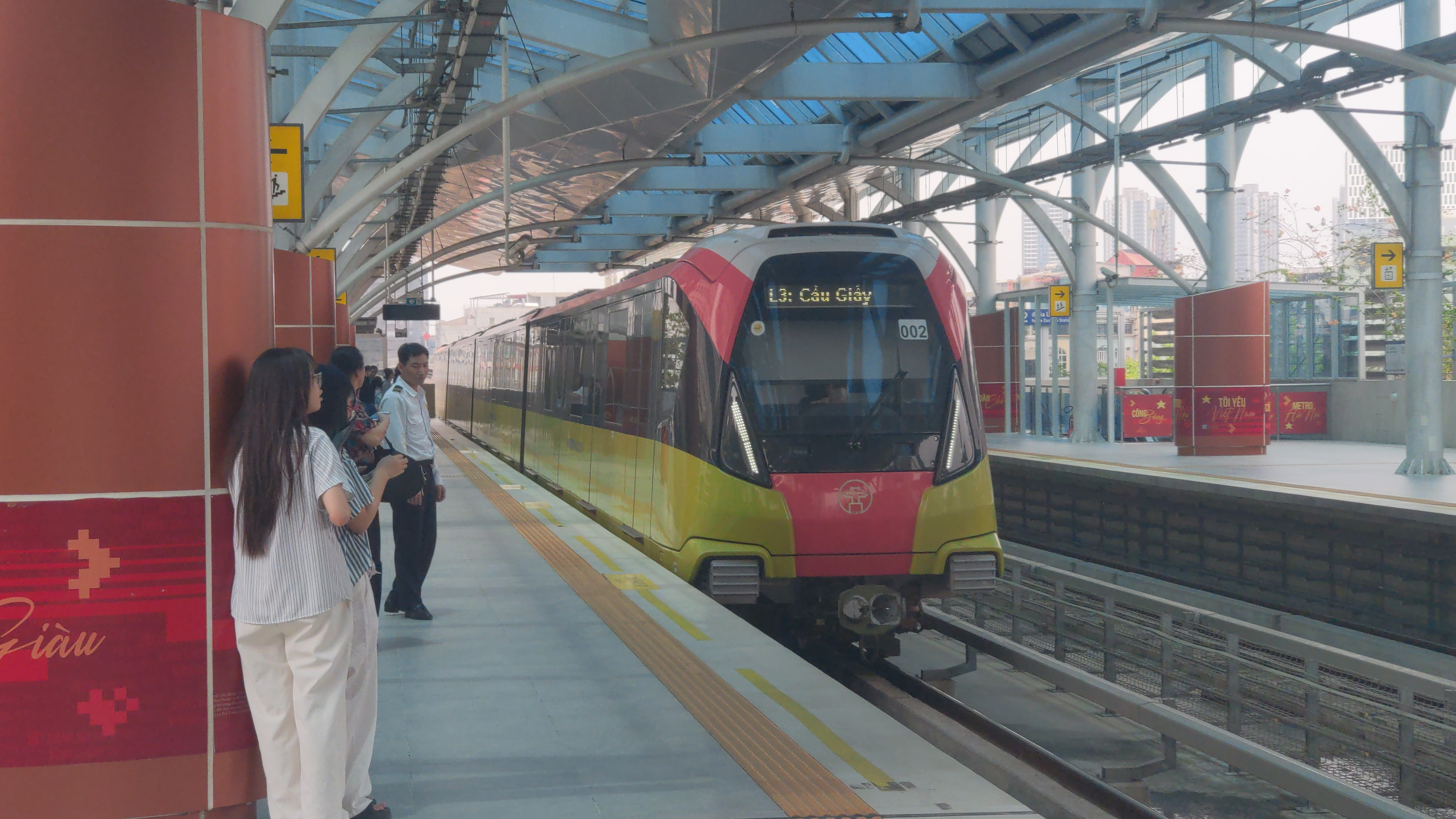
A Line 3 train arriving at National University station.

On 17 January 2017, Hanoi Metro Company signed a contract with French locomotive manufacturer Alstom to supply the rolling stock for Line 3, which will come from its Alstom Metropolis series. The current order is for 10 train sets, costing around US$128 million. The trains features an air-conditioning system, speakers, automatic LED lights. The interior is wheelchair accessible, and also includes dedicated space and seating for senior citizens. Each train can carry 950 passengers. The first four-car trains were shipped from the port of Dunkirk, on 9 September 2020.

The cyan, pink and grey of the exterior design symbolises rice seeding leaves and dragon fruit, some of the main products in Vietnam. Additionally, like Line 2A, the seal of the Hanoi Temple of Literature is displayed on the front of the train.

== Fares and ticketing ==
=== Fares ===
Fares on the Hanoi Metro system are set by the city (People's Committee), and are calculated by distance increments between stations, rather than the fare zone system used by other systems (London Underground) or flat fare (NYC Subway). In addition, the system does not utilize peak-hour or off-peak fare, as commuters pay the exact same fare regardless of when they board.

The ticket system will allow for connection between all routes and will be usable with other public transportation such as bus, taxi, etc. The tickets will be available for purchase at the terminal (ticket office or vending machine), using a modern, compact form of ticket (similar to an ATM card). Tickets will use modern technology, with value retention and high security.

There will be many types of tickets for passengers to choose from: Tickets take turns, Ticket by day, week, month, Group ticket and Electronic ticket (IC Card) combines many other gadgets.

=== Line 2A Fares and ticketing ===
The price of the tickets for the Cat Linh-Ha Dong metro, with the lowest one being VND 9,000 (USD 0.34) for a short trip, VND 19,000 (USD 0.72) for a longest trip, and VND 40,000 (USD 1.52) for a day pass.

=== Line 3 Fares and ticketing ===
The price of the tickets for the Nhon-Ha Noi station metro, with the lowest one being VND 9,000 (USD 0.34) for a short trip, VND 15,000 (USD 0.57) for a longest trip, and VND 40,000 (USD 1.52) for a day pass.

=== Monthly pass and others ===
- A monthly pass for a common passenger is priced at VND 280,000 (USD 10.62), for a group of more than 30 people is priced at VND 200,000 (USD 7.59) per person.
- A monthly pass for a student/worker in industrial park is priced at VND 140,000 (USD 5.31)
- Children (under 6), seniors (over 60), and people who are disabled or have registered as having low income are eligible for a free pass.

=== Ticketing ===
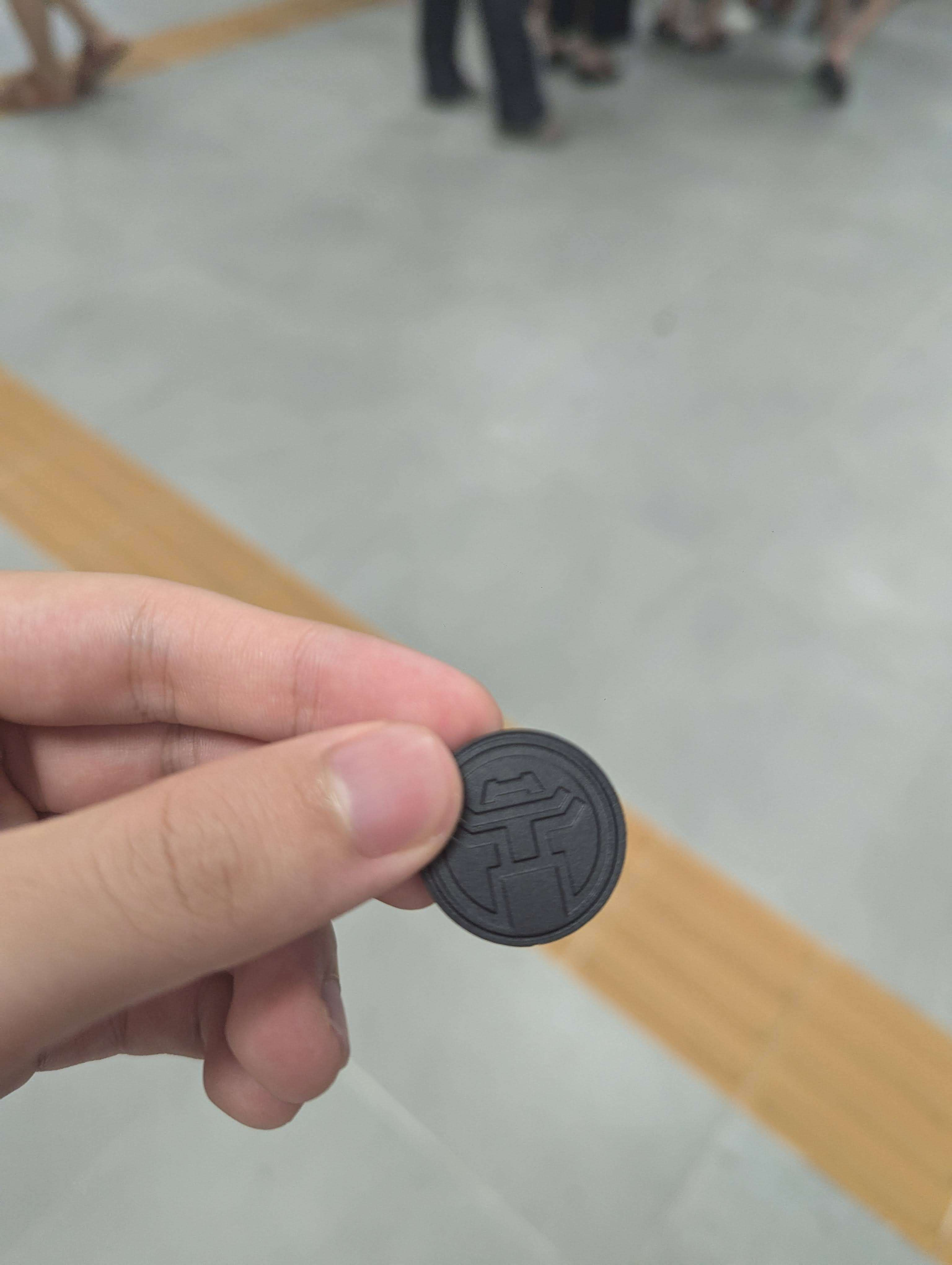
A single use ticket for Line 3, in the shape of a circular token..

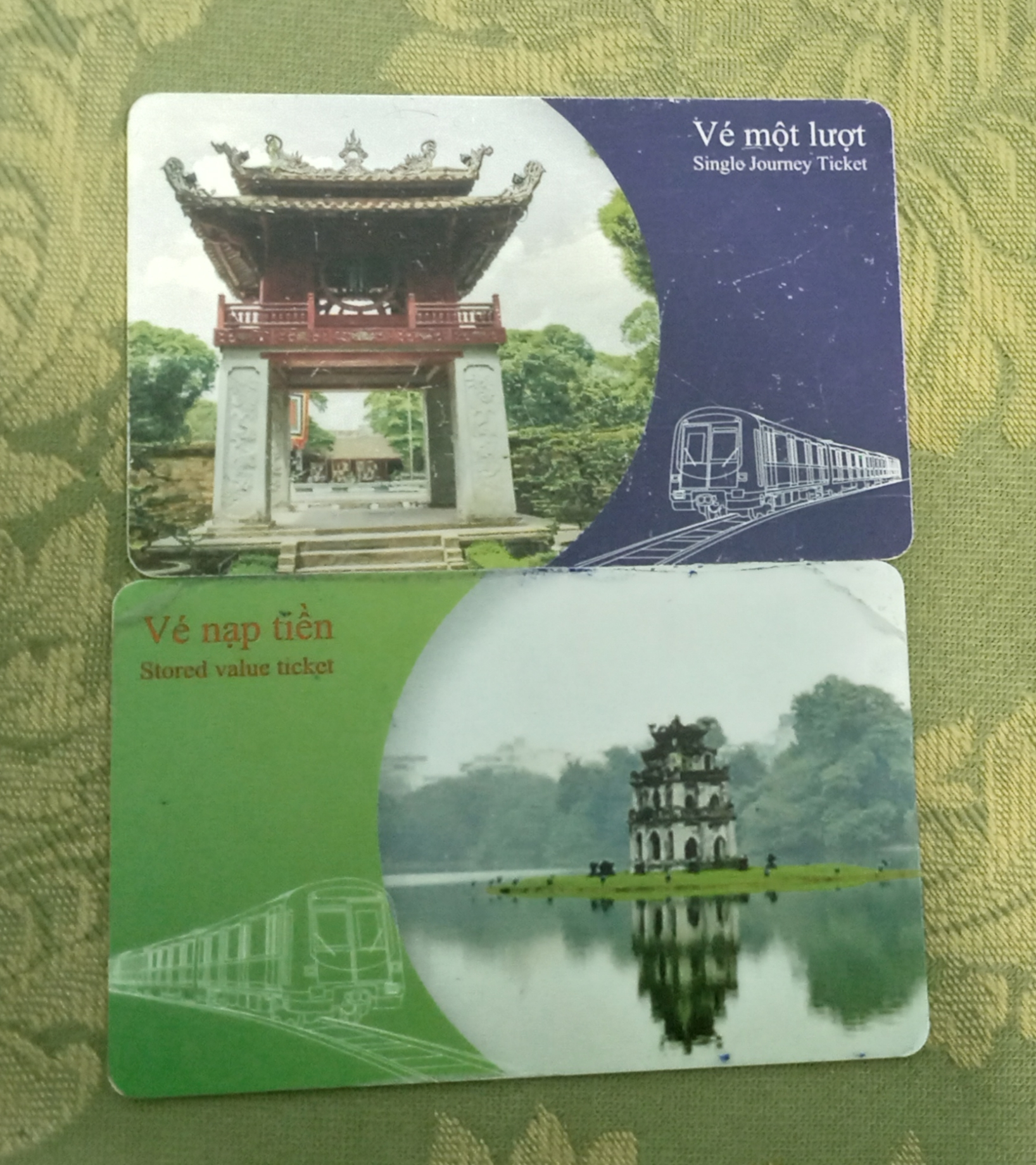
A single journey ticket for Line 2A (top) and stored value ticket ̣(bottom)

The Hanoi Metro system accepts various payment methods for ticketing, including cash, debit/credit card, and VietQR code. Ticket can be bought at counters located in the stations. In a trial started 23 September 2025, commuters can use contactless Visa card or mobile devices (Apple Pay, Google Pay), scanning VietQR code, or using their National Identity Card at payment gate on Line 2A.

Line	Cash/VietQR (at the counter)	QR Payment from digital wallets (Momo, ShopeePay, VNPT Money)	Contactless payment (at-gate)
Line 2	Yes	Yes	Yes, Visa cards only
Line 3	Yes	Yes	Yes, Visa cards only

From 18 November 2025, Physical single journey ticket card selling at ticket vending machines on Line 2A is no longer to buy and use. Old stored value ticket for Line 2A is also no longer to use, buy new and top up value. All vending machines on Line 2A are not in service.

From 17 January 2026, Circle token single journey ticket selling at ticket vending machines on Line 3 is no longer to buy and use. Old stored value ticket for Line 3 is also no longer to use, buy new and top up value. All vending machines on Line 3 are not in service. To buy QR single journey ticket, passenger must buy at counter or in Hanoi Metro App.

== See also ==
- Transport in Vietnam
- Ho Chi Minh City Metro, another rapid transit system in Vietnam
