= Đại Từ district =

Đại Từ District Huyện Đại Từ
- District
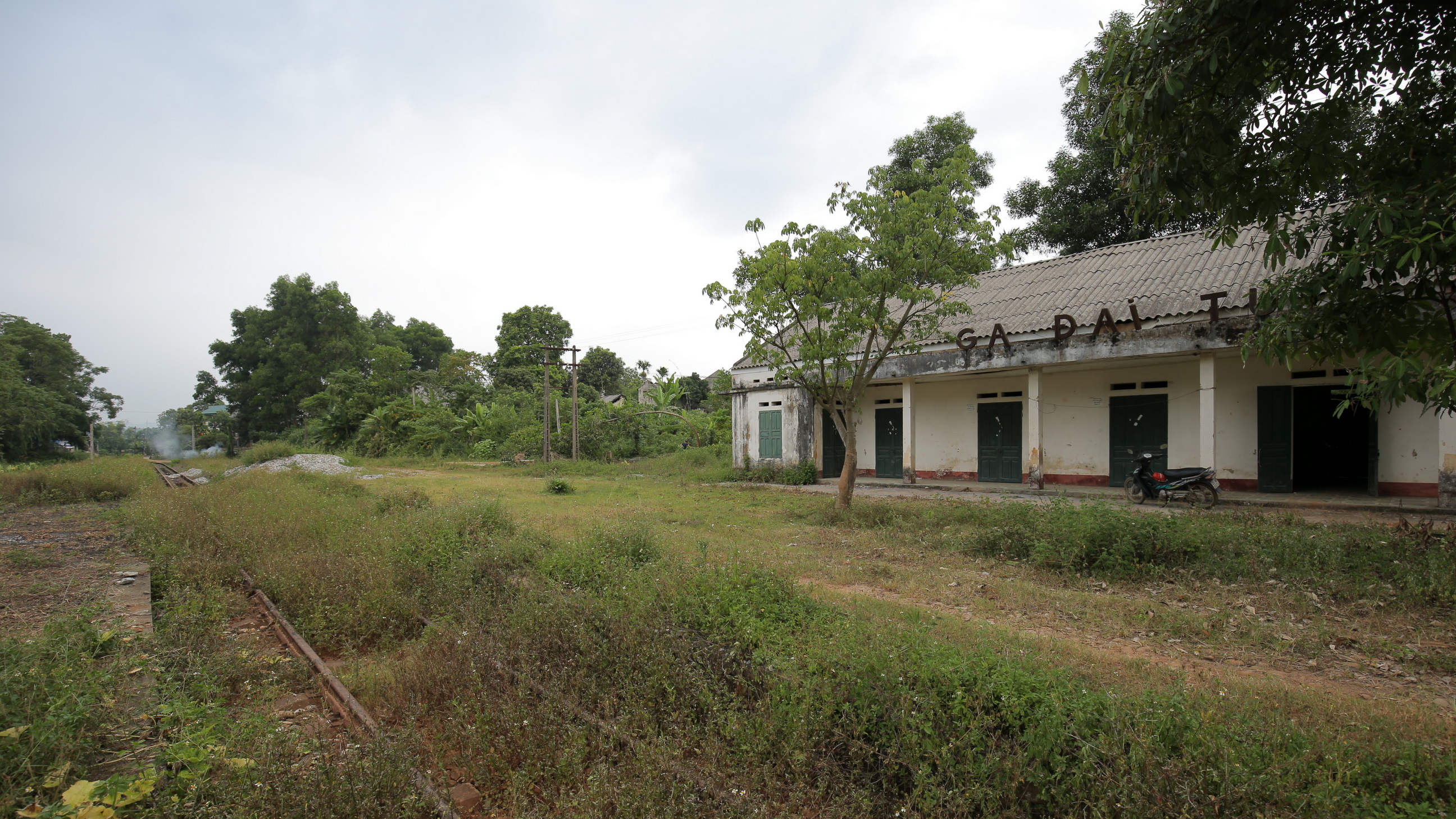
- Đại Từ Railway Station

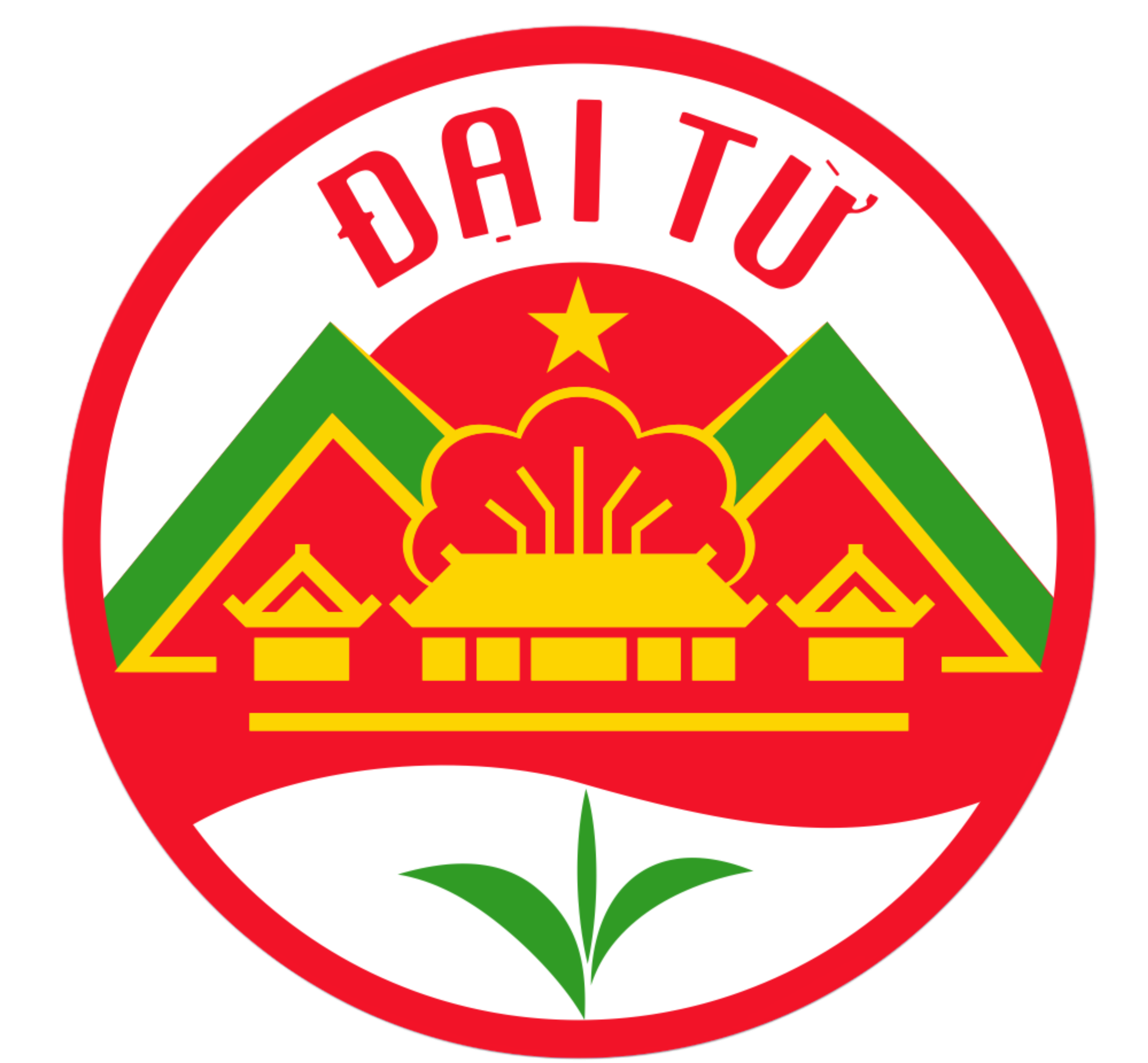
- Seal

- Location within Vietnam
- Coordinates: 21°36′17″N 105°37′28″E
- Country: Vietnam
- Region: Northeast
- Province: Thái Nguyên
- Capital: Hùng Sơn

Government
  - Chairman of the People's Council: Lê Kim Phúc
  - Chairman of the People's Committee: Phạm Quang Anh

Area
  - District: 223 sq mi (578 km^{2})

Population (2003)
  - District: 163,637
  - Density: 780/sq mi (302/km^{2})
  - Urban: 19,059
- Time zone: UTC+7 (UTC + 7)
- Website: daitu.thainguyen.gov.vn

Đại Từ is a former rural district of Thái Nguyên province in the Northeast region of Vietnam. As of 2003 the district had a population of 163,637. The district covers an area of 578 km^{2}. The district capital lies at Hùng Sơn.

== Administrative divisions ==
Hùng Sơn, Quân Chu, An Khánh, Bản Ngoại, Bình Thuận, Cát Nê, Cù Vân, Đức Lương, Hà Thượng, Hoàng Nông, Khôi Kỳ, Ký Phú, La Bằng, Lục Ba, Minh Tiến, Mỹ Yên, Na Mao, Phú Cường, Phú Lạc, Phú Thịnh, Phú Xuyên, Phúc Lương, Phục Linh, Quân Chu, Tân Linh, Tân Thái, Tiên Hội, Vạn Thọ, Văn Yên, Yên Lãng
