= Võ Nhai =

- Commune
- Mỏ Gà Stream
- Interactive map of Võ Nhai
- Coordinates: 21.7524°N 106.0746°E
- Country: Vietnam
- Region: Northeast
- Province: Thái Nguyên
- Established: 2025

Area
  - Total: 99.78 km^{2} (38.53 sq mi)

Population (2025)
  - Total: 17,509
  - Density: 175/km^{2} (450/sq mi)
- Website: vonhai.thainguyen.gov.vn

Võ Nhai is a commune in the eastern part of Thái Nguyên province, Vietnam.

== History ==
On 25 October 1990, Đình Cả township was established from part of the area and population of Phú Thượng commune.

In June 2025, Võ Nhai commune was established through the merger of the entire natural area and population of Đình Cả township, Phú Thượng commune, and Lâu Thượng commune of Võ Nhai district.
