= Vô Tranh (disambiguation) =

Vô Tranh may refer to several places in Vietnam, including:

- Vô Tranh, Thái Nguyên, a rural commune of Thái Nguyên province.
- Vô Tranh, Bắc Giang, a former rural commune of Lục Nam District.
- Vô Tranh, Phú Thọ, a former rural commune of Hạ Hòa District.
