= Phú Lương, Thái Nguyên =

Former Vietnamese Commune

Phú Lương
- Xã
- Interactive map of Phú Lương
- Location in Vietnam
- Coordinates: 21°46′17″N 105°45′07″E
- Country: Vietnam
- Region: Northeast
- Province: Thái Nguyên

Government
  - Chairman of the People’s Committee: Dương Đức Huynh
  - Vice Chairman of the People’s Committee: Nguyễn Văn Huấn; Thi Văn Thưởng

Area
  - Total: 16.80 sq mi (43.50 km^{2})

Population (1999)
  - Total: 6,872
  - Density: 410/sq mi (158/km^{2})
- Time zone: UTC+07:00
- Website: yenlac.phuluong.thainguyen.gov.vn

Phú Lương was a commune in Thái Nguyên province, Vietnam.

In June 2025, Phú Lương Commune was established on the basis of the merger of the entire natural area and population of Yên Lạc Commune (natural area: 42.43 km²; population: 8,371 people), Động Đạt Commune (natural area: 35.64 km²; population: 10,207 people), Đu Township (natural area: 15.68 km²; population: 14,139 people), and Giang Tiên Township (natural area: 18.64 km²; population: 11,197 people) of Phú Lương District.

== Geography ==
Yên Lạc bordered

- Đồng Hỷ, Phú Đô commune and Tức Tranh commune to the east
- Đu town, Động Đạt commune and Yên Đổ commune to the west
- Đu town to the south
- Bắc Kạn and Yên Ninh to the north

== History ==
Until 2018, Yên Lạc was divided under 23 hamlets(xóm): Yên Thịnh, Hang Neo, Ó, Đẩu, Đồng Xiền, Đồng Mỏ, Làng Lớn, Phân Bơi, Cầu Đá, Mương Gằng, Cây Thị, Ao Lác, Tiên Thông A, Tiên Thông B, Na Mụ, Viện Tân, Kim Lan, Đồng Bòng, Yên Thủy 1, Yên Thủy 2, Yên Thủy 3, Yên Thủy 4, Yên Thủy 5

On December 8, 2018, Đẩu and Yên Thịnh would merge into Đẩu hamlet, Tiên Thông A and Tiên Thông B merged into Tiên Thông hamlet, Yên Thủy 4 and Yên Thủy 5 merged into Yên Thủy 4 hamlet, making a total new amount of 20 hamlets.

On June, 2025, Yên Lạc merged with Đu, Giang Tiên town, and Động Đạt commune to form Phú Lương commune.
