= Tích Lương =

Tích Lương Phường Tích Lương
- Ward
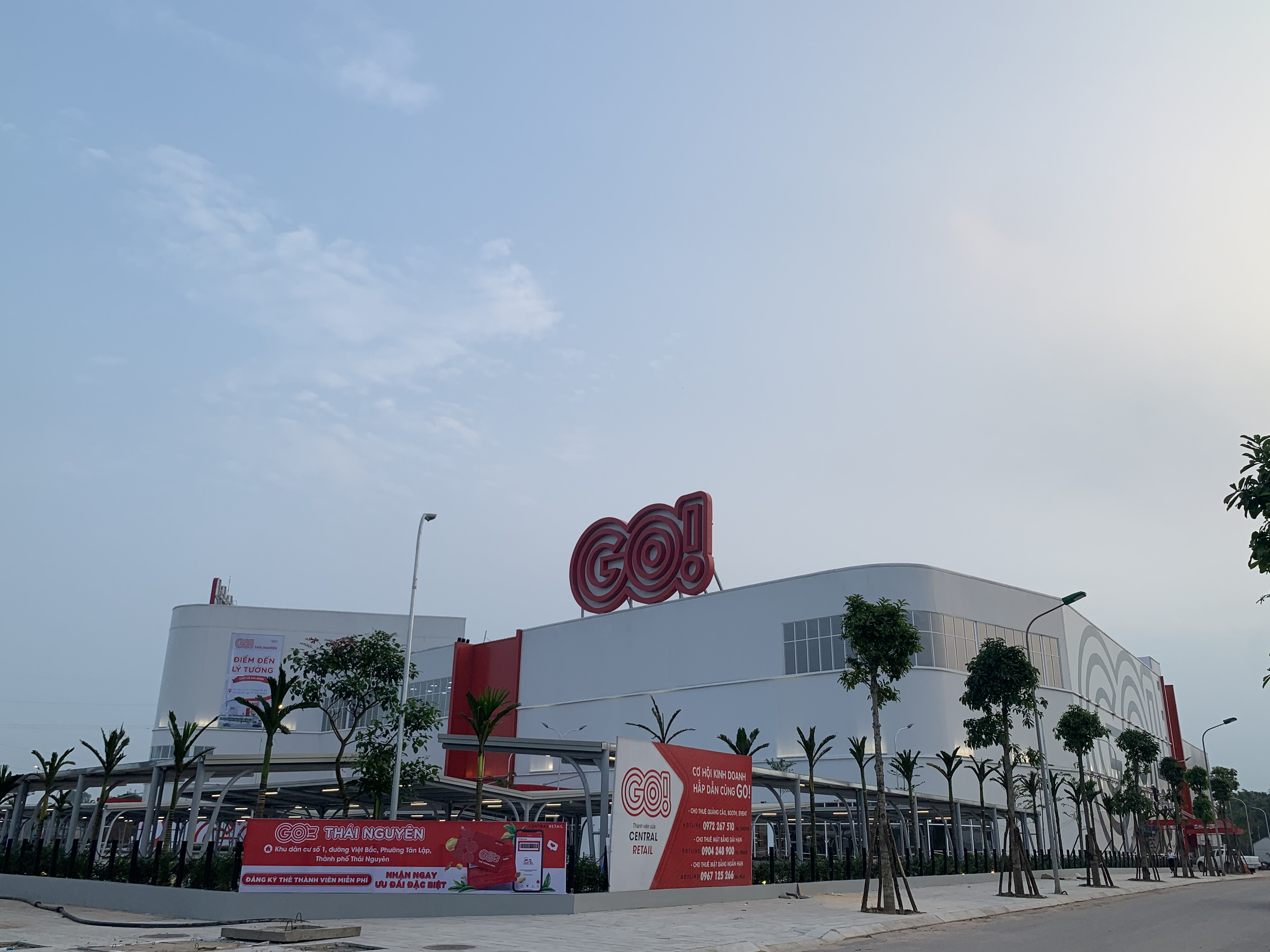
- GO! Thái Nguyên
- Interactive map of Tích Lương
- Location in Vietnam
- Country: Vietnam
- Regions: Northeast
- Province: Thái Nguyên Province
- Established: June 16, 2025

Area
  - Total: 23.56 km^{2} (9.10 sq mi)

Population (2025)
  - Total: 55,278
  - Density: 2,346/km^{2} (6,077/sq mi)
- Time zone: UTC+07:00 (Indochina Time)

Tích Lương is a ward (phường) of Thái Nguyên Province, Vietnam.

== Geography ==
Tích Lương Ward located in southern Thái Nguyên Province, and adjacent to:

- Phan Đình Phùng Ward to the north
- Bách Quang Ward to the south
- Quyết Thắng Ward and Tân Cương Commune to the west
- Gia Sàng Ward to the east.

== History ==
On June 12, 2025, the National Assembly of Vietnam issued Resolution No. 202/2025/QH15 on the arrangement of provincial-level administrative units (effective from June 12, 2025). Accordingly, the entire land area and population of Bắc Kạn Province and Thái Nguyên Province were merged to form a new province named Thái Nguyên Province.

On June 16, 2025, the Standing Committee of the National Assembly of Vietnam issued Resolution No. 1683/NQ-UBTVQH15 on the arrangement of commune-level administrative units of Thái Nguyên Province in 2025 (effective from June 16, 2025). Accordingly, the entire land area and population of Trung Thành, Phú Xá, Tân Thành, Tân Lập, Tích Lương Wards, and part of Cam Giá Ward (Thái Nguyên City) were merged to form a new ward named Tích Lương Ward.
