= Ngọc Hồi station =

Railway station in Hanoi, Vietnam

Ngoc Hoi Ga Ngọc Hồi

General information
- Location: Thanh Trì District, Hanoi, Vietnam
- Operated by: Vietnam Railways
- Line(s): North–South express railway

Ngọc Hồi Station is a planned railway hub in Thanh Trì, Hanoi, Vietnam. It will serve as the northern terminus station for the North–South express railway, along with Hanoi Metro Line 1. Hanoi's government has allocated 171 hectares (420 acres) for the station.
