= Vô Tranh =

Former Vietnamese Commune

- Commune
- Interactive map of Vô Tranh
- Location in Vietnam
- Coordinates: 21°43′40″N 105°46′0″E
- Country: Vietnam
- Region: Northeast
- Province: Thái Nguyên

Area
  - Total: 10.09 sq mi (26.14 km^{2})

Population (1999)
  - Total: 8,059
  - Density: 800/sq mi (308/km^{2})
- Time zone: UTC+07:00
- Website: http://tuctranh.phuluong.thainguyen.gov.vn

Vô Tranh was a commune in Thái Nguyên province, Vietnam.

In June 2025, Vô Tranh Commune was established on the basis of the merger of the entire natural area and population of Tức Tranh Commune (natural area: 25.47 km²; population: 10,317 people), Cổ Lũng Commune (natural area: 16.93 km²; population: 10,798 people), Vô Tranh Commune (natural area: 18.36 km²; population: 10,317 people), and Phú Đô Commune (natural area: 22.77 km²; population: 6,821 people) of Phú Lương District.

== Geography ==
Tức Tranh bordered

- Phú Đô commune to the east
- Đu and Yên Lạc to the west
- Yên Lạc to the north
- Đồng Hỷ district, Phấn Mễ and Vô Tranh commune to the south
- Phú Đô and Yên Lạc to the north

== History ==
Under Nghị quyết số 1683/NQ-UBTVQH15, on June, 2025, it merged with Cổ Lũng, Phú Đô and Vô Tranh to form Vô Tranh.
