= Đồng Hỷ district =

Đồng Hỷ district Huyện Đồng Hỷ
- Rural District
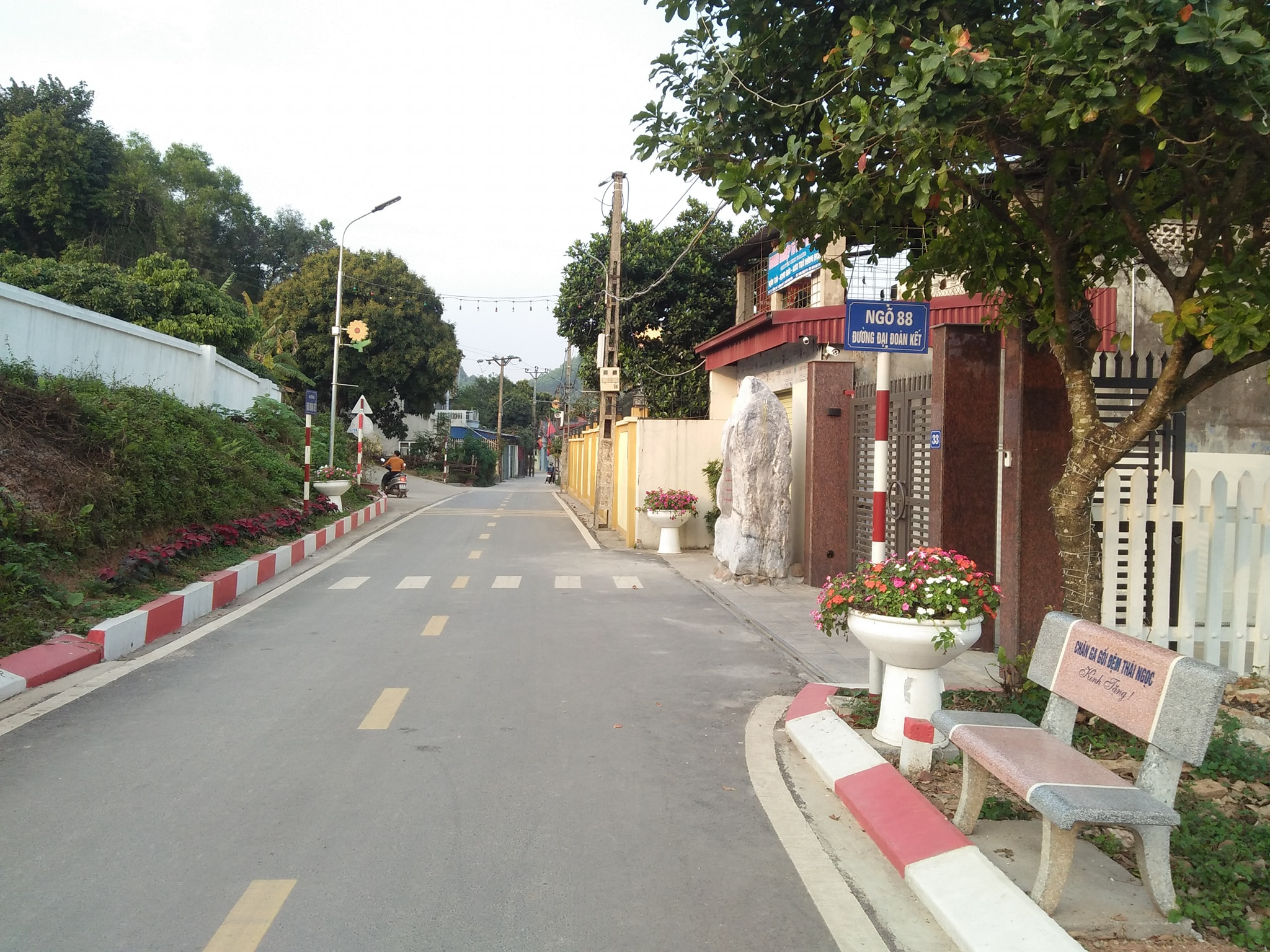
- Đại Đoàn Kết route in Hóa Thượng commune is on the 130th anniversary of President Ho Chi Minh's birthday

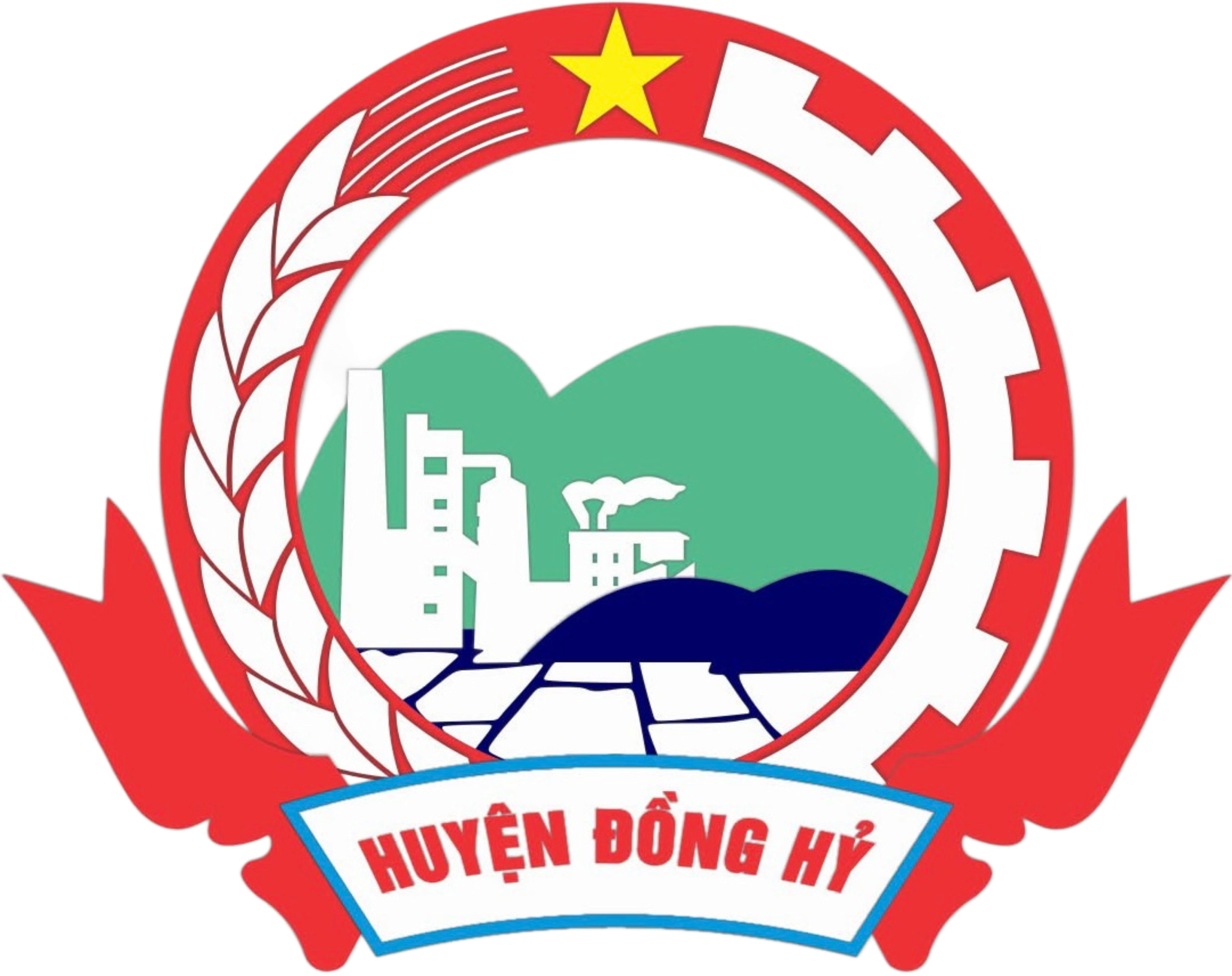
- Seal

- Location within Vietnam
- Coordinates: 21°41′10″N 105°55′43″E
- Country: Vietnam
- Region: Northeast
- Province: Thái Nguyên
- Established: 1469
- Capital: Hóa Thượng

Government

Area
  - Rural District: 16,515 sq mi (42,773 km^{2})

Population (April 1, 2019)
  - Rural District: 92.421
  - Urban: 21.436 (232%); Including the population of Hóa Thượng commune it is already an urban area of class V
- Time zone: UTC+7 (UTC + 7)
- Website: donghy.thainguyen.gov.vn

Đồng Hỷ is a former rural district of Thái Nguyên province in the Northeast region of Vietnam.

== History ==
As of April 1, 2019, the district had a population of 92,421. The district covers an area of 427.73 km^{2}. The district capital lies at Hóa Thượng.

== Geography ==
Đồng Hỷ district is bordered by Bac Kan in the north, Võ Nhai district in the northeast; it borders on Phú Lương district to the west; It borders Thái Nguyên city and Phú Bình district to the south and borders Yên Thế district to the east.

== Administration ==
Đồng Hỷ district is subdivided to 15 commune-level subdivisions, including the townships of Sông Cầu, Trại Cau and the rural communes of: Cây Thị, Hóa Thượng (district capital), Hóa Trung, Hòa Bình, Hợp Tiến, Khe Mo, Minh Lập, Nam Hòa, Quang Sơn, Tân Lợi, Tân Long, Văn Hán, Văn Lăng.

The new district of Đồng Hỷ district is located in Hoa Thuong Commune. However, due to the fact that the district's administrative office has not yet been completed, Đồng Hỷ District continues to use its former headquarters in the Chùa Hang ward, Thái Nguyên city.

== History ==
Đồng Hỷ district was established during the Tran Dynasty. In 1469, under the reign of King Le Thanh Tong, he changed to Dong Hy; The district was changed to Dong Hy, then changed to Dong Hy; is one of the 7 districts of Phu Binh. During the Nguyen Dynasty (XIX), the district of Dong Hy was composed of nine, 33 communes, villages, pages and wards; The district is located in Huong Thuong Commune.

Compared to other districts in the province, Dong Hy always has a disturbance in its administrative boundaries, especially in the 20th century, where the last half of this century has almost always been fluctuating.

Together with the adjustment of the provincial boundaries, the abandonment of the provincial government, the division of the province and the district of the province were cut down. Lang, Thuong Nung (now Thuong Nung), Linh Son on the Vo Nhai. Thinh Dan commune, Sa Kiet (Sa Kệ-Sa Can) from the Tuc Duyen to establish a total of Thinh Dan. Changing the total of the Dong Bang River to a total of Cam Xa, dividing Luu Xa commune of Tuc Duyen to Cam Gia district, separating Van Han commune from Cam Gia district to establish the new Van Han commune. Thus, at the beginning of the twentieth century, there were seven generations of Tuc Duyen, Thinh Dan, Nui Cuong (Nui Quang), Hoa Thuong, Cam Gia, Huong Thuong and Van Han.

Since the 12th year (1813), the town of Thai Nguyen (also the capital, from 1831 is the capital) was located in Dong Mo village of Đồng Hỷ District; The palace is also located in Dong Son (now the ward of [[Trung Vuong, Thai Nguyen city] Trung Vuong]]); Đồng Hỷ District in Huong Thuong commune, early twentieth century moved to Dong Mo. August Revolution, Thai Nguyen town] officially became an administrative unit, the revolutionary government of the town The provincial capital of Thai Nguyen became the provincial town of Thai Nguyen, separated from Đồng Hỷ District.

In 1957, under the decision of Prime Minister, Mo Sat commune of Yên Thế district in Bac Giang province transferred to Đồng Hỷ District (the latter commune was changed to Hop Tien commune). Đồng Hỷ district has 28 communes: Hop Tien, Cay Thi, Nam Hoa, Huong Thuong, Van Han, Minh Lap, Khe Mo, Linh Son, Cao Ngan, Hoa Thuong, Hoa Trung, Phuc Ha, Thinh Dan, Phuc Xuan, Phuc.

In 1958, the government decided to take a portion of the land of Dong Bam, Cao Ngan, and Hoa Thuong communes to establish the town of Elephant Mountain and the Chien Thang subdivision Thai Nguyen. October 19, 1962, the Government of Vietnam issued Decision 114 / CP on the establishment of Thai Nguyen city and Trai Cau town. In implementation of this Decision, Dong Hy commune was transferred to Thai Nguyen city in 6 communes: Cam Gia, Gia Sàng, Tuc Duyen, Quang Vinh, Dong Bam, Dong Quang (except for Kien Ninh, Phu Thai and Yen Lap). Quyet Thang commune and cut three villages of Thai Thong, Doan Ket and Thac Ngac of Tan Loi commune to set up Trai Cau township in Thai Nguyen city. Đồng Hỷ district has 22 communes: Ba Xuyen, Binh Son, Cao Ngan, Cay Thi, Hoa Thuong, Hoa Trung, Hop Tien, Huong Thuong, Khe Mo, Linh Son, Minh Lap, Nam Hoa, Phuc Ha, Phuc Triu, Phuc Xuan, Xinjiang, Tan Loi, Tan Quang, Thinh Dan, Thinh Duc, Tich Luong, Van Han.

October 1967, established the town of Song Cau farm.

In October 1982, the district received Trai Cau Township from Thai Nguyen City.

In October 1983, Phuc Tho Commune (a large area of land submerged in Nui Coc Lake) in Dai Tu district was merged with Tan Thang Village, Dong Dang Village. Phuc Thuan commune of Pho Yen district, Yen Ninh village of Phuc Triu commune, Đồng Hỷ District, Phuc Tan commune, Đồng Hỷ District.

On April 2, 1985, The Council of Ministers (later the government) issued Decision 102-HDBT regulating the boundaries of some districts and towns in Bac Thai Province . Accordingly, Dong Hy hand-over to Thai Nguyen city 7 communes: Phuc Ha, Phuc Xuan, Phuc Triu, Xin Cuong, Thinh Duc, Thinh Dan, Tich Luong; The four communes of Ba Xuyen, Binh Son, Phuc Tan and Tan Quang were assigned to Pho Yen district. They were also received from Thai Nguyen city, Dong Bam commune, Chien Thang sub-district, Nui Voi town, Trai Cau town. Received from 4 communes Vo Nhai is Tan Long, Van Lang, Hoa Binh, Quang Son.

After the Chien Thang precinct and the Nui Voi town, the district was merged into Chua Hang town - the district town.

By the end of 2007, Đồng Hỷ District had two towns: Chua Hang, Trai Can; Cau Giay, Dong Bam, Hoa Binh, Hoa Thuong, Hoa Trung, Hop Tien, Huong Thuong, Khe Mo, Linh Son, Minh Lap, Nam Hoa, Quang Son, Tan Loi, Tan Long, Van Han, Van Lang.

July 31, the Government of Vietnam issued Decree No. 84/2008-CP on the adjustment of Đồng Hỷ District boundary to expand Thai city. Nguyen district, Cao Ngan and Dong Bang communes to Thai Nguyen city management.

On the January 13 year 2011, the Government issued Resolution No. 05 / NQ-CP on dissolving and adjusting boundaries to establish wards and townships in Thai Nguyen; Accordingly, Song Cau town was established on the basis of the dissolution of the town of Song Cau farm.

August, 2017, moved the town of Hang Pagoda and two communes, Linh Son, Dong Hy, Linh Son, about the city of Taiyuan management. The remaining 13 communes and 2 townships remain stable, up to now.

The new district of Đồng Hỷ District will be moved to Hoa Thuong Commune and next to the Military Region 1 Commander.

== Celebrity ==
This mountainous district - although very little, but still has a doctorate life Le Le. It is the commune of Sa Ka, Van Lang commune, Đồng Hỷ District, Thai Nguyen province. Dong Sam Doctor was born in the third year of Hong Thuat (1511), the king of Le Tuong Duc. As regards the title. The name and birthplace of Dam Sam is written on the doctor's stele in Temple of Literature - National monastery in Hanoi.
