= Đồng Hỷ =

Coordinates: 21°38′50″N 105°49′40″E

Đồng Hỷ Xã Đồng Hỷ
- Commune
- Interactive map of Đồng Hỷ
- Country: Vietnam
- Province: Thái Nguyên Province

Population (2022)
  - Total: 13,871
  - Density: 2,680/sq mi (1,036/km^{2})
- Time zone: UTC+07:00 (Indochina Time)

Đồng Hỷ is a commune (xã) of Thái Nguyên Province, Vietnam.

In June 2025, Đồng Hỷ Commune was established through the merger of the entire natural area and population of Hóa Thượng Township (natural area: 13.39 km²; population: 14,406), Sông Cầu Township (natural area: 10.21 km²; population: 3,971), Minh Lập Commune (natural area: 18.22 km²; population: 7,342), and Hóa Trung Commune (natural area: 11.90 km²; population: 5,293) of Đồng Hỷ District.
