= Sông Công (city) =

- Provincial city (Class-2)
- Sông Công City; Thành phố Sông Công
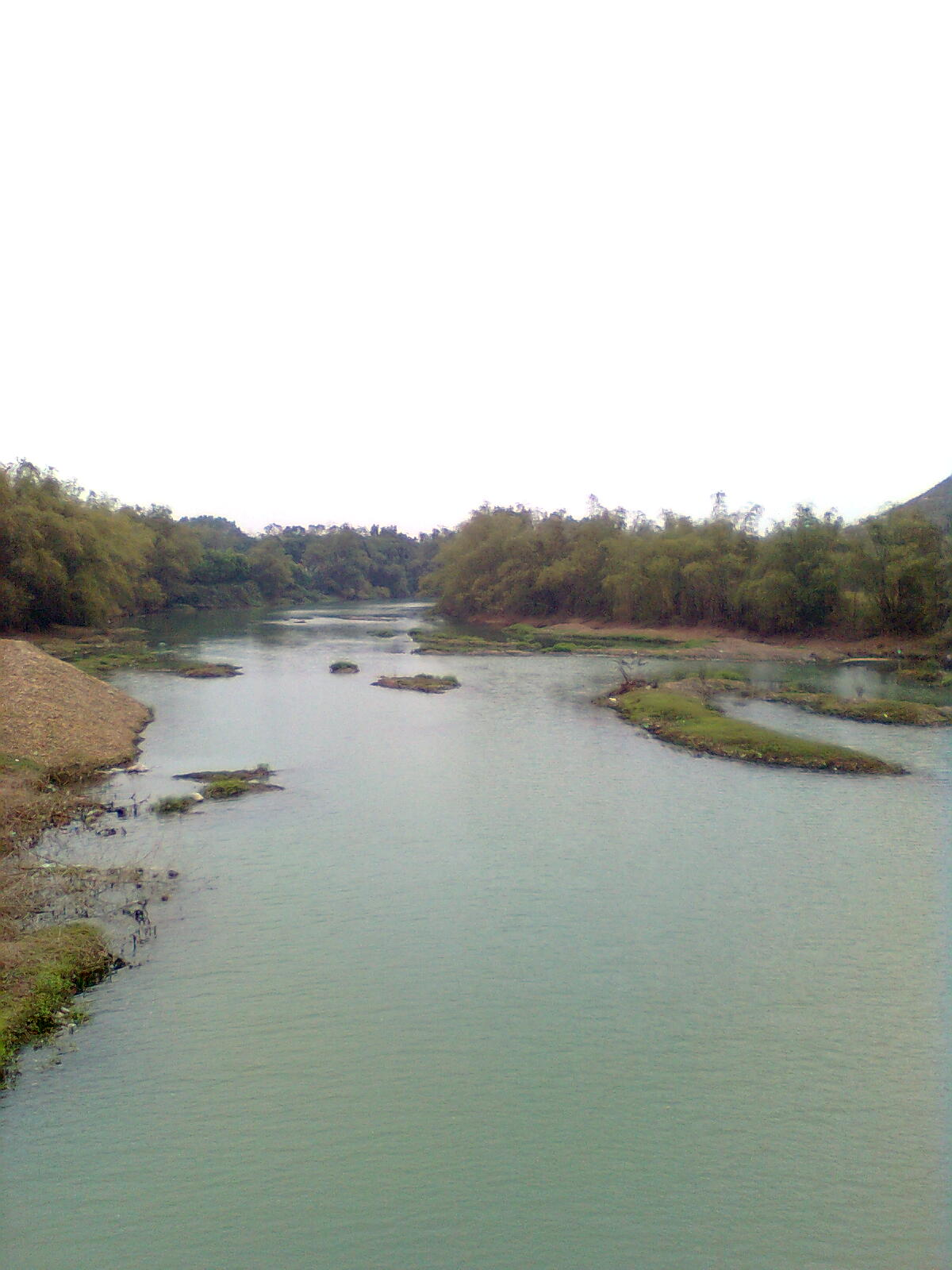
- Công River seen from the suspension bridge looking downstream

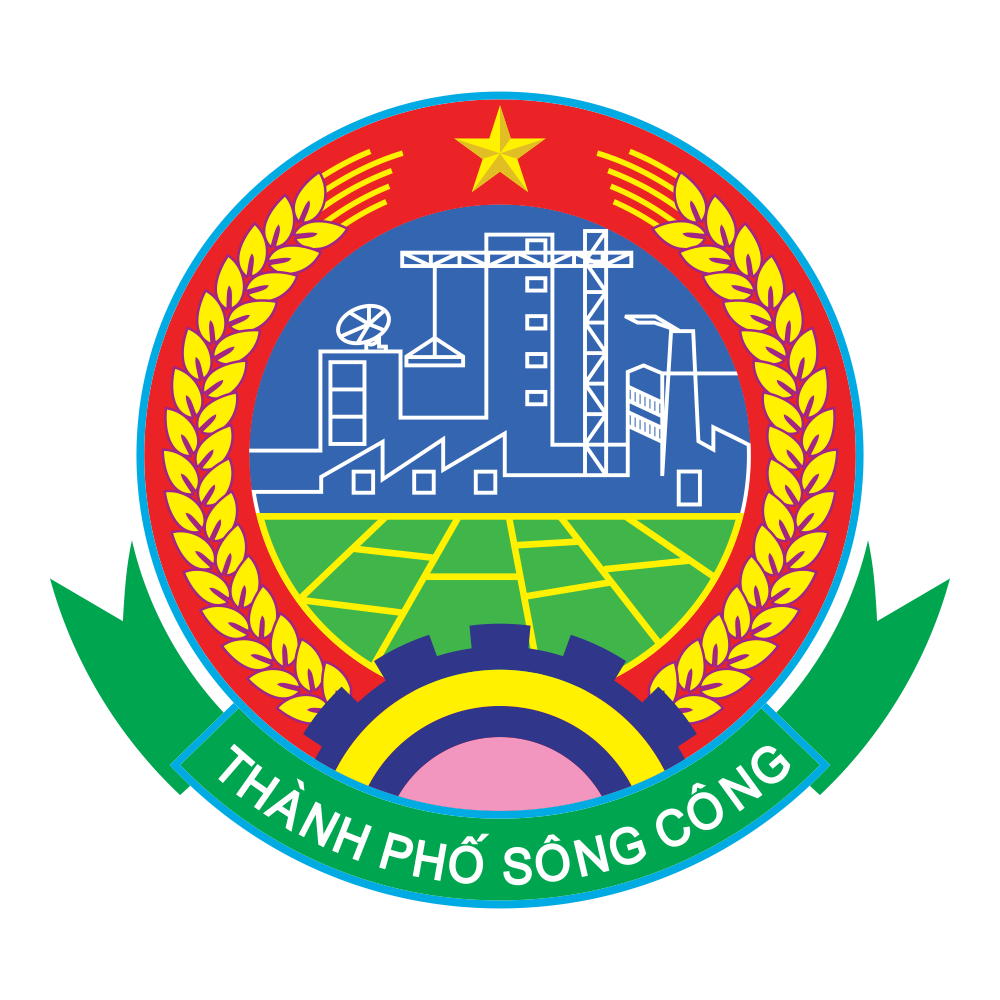
- Seal
- Interactive map of Sông Công
- Location within Vietnam Location within Southeast Asia Location within Asia
- Coordinates: 21°29′14″N 105°48′47″E
- Country: Vietnam
- Region: north-east
- Province: Thái Nguyên
- Administrative divisions: 7 Wards, 3 Communes
- Established city: 15 May 2015

Government
  - Party's Secretary: Dương Xuân Hùng
  - Chairman of People's Council: Dương Xuân Hùng
  - Chairman of People's Committee: Lê Văn Khôi

Area
  - Total: 37.98 sq mi (98.37 km^{2})

Population (2022)
  - Total: 128,357
  - Density: 3,420/sq mi (1,319/km^{2})
- Time zone: UTC+07:00 (Indochina Time)
- Area code: 208
- Website: http://songcong.thainguyen.gov.vn/

Sông Công is a former provincial city (thành phố thuộc tỉnh) of Thái Nguyên Province in the north-east region of Vietnam. Song Cong city is currently a Class-2 city. As of 2022 the city had a population of 128,357. The city covers an area of 98.37 km^{2}.

Song Cong is an industrial city, economic, administrative and cultural center in the South of Thai Nguyen province; It is an important traffic and socio-economic development hub of the Northeastern region. With the transitional position between the plain and the midland, the Cong River has national and provincial roads running through Hanoi to the South and Thai Nguyen City in the North, which is a very favorable condition. to promote trade with economic regions in the North of Hanoi Capital, the South of the Northern Midland and Mountainous Region with the center being Thai Nguyen City and the economic regions of Tam Dao - Vinh Phuc, Bac Ninh and Bac Giang. With special advantages, Song Cong has long been identified as a major industrial center and a hinge urban center and economic transshipment between regions inside and outside Thai Nguyen province.

On July 1, 2015, Song Cong solemnly held the 30th anniversary of the founding of Song Cong town, announced the establishment of Song Cong city and received the Third-class labor medal and the presence of many delegates. coming from cities and towns in Viet Bac area.

== Location ==
Sông Công city borders Thái Nguyên city to the north; borders Phú Bình District to the east and Phổ Yên City to the west and south. The city has a quite favorable position: 65 km north of Hanoi capital, 15 km south of Thái Nguyên city, 45 km from Nội Bài International Airport, 17 km from Núi Cốc Lake.

== Geography ==
The Công River flows through the town. Sông Công itself means "Cong River".

== Administrative divisions ==
- Wards (phường): Bách Quang, Cải Đan, Châu Sơn, Mỏ Chè, Phố Cò, Thắng Lợi, Lương Sơn.
- Communes (xã): Bá Xuyên, Bình Sơn, Tân Quang
