= Võ Nhai district =

Võ Nhai district Huyện Võ Nhai
- District
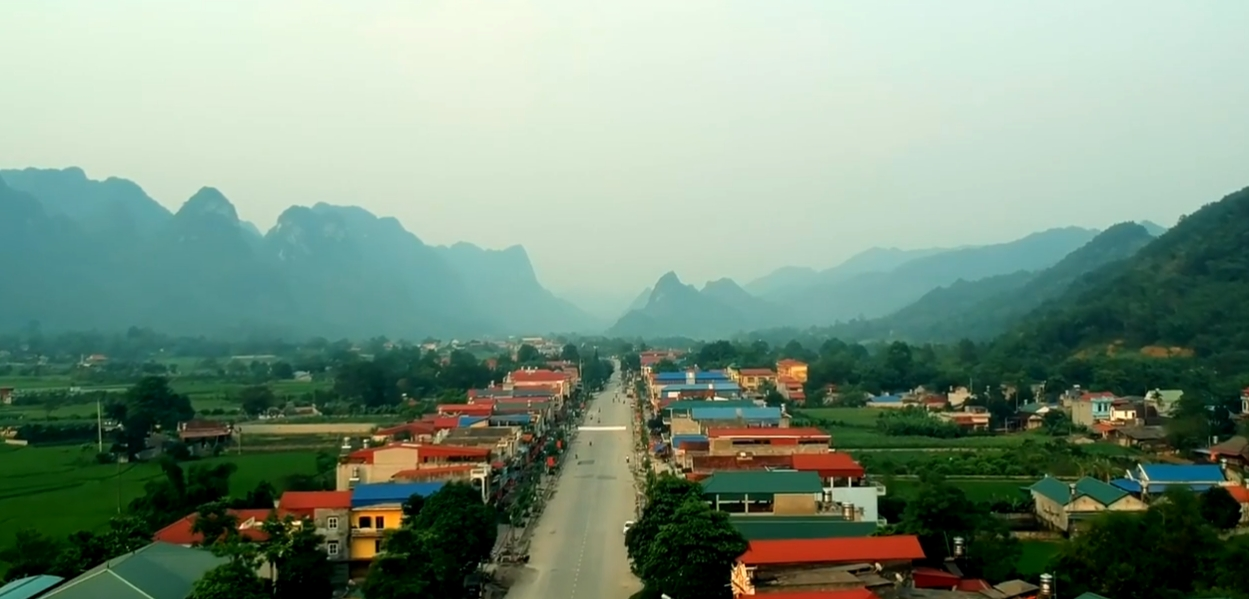
- Đình Cả Town

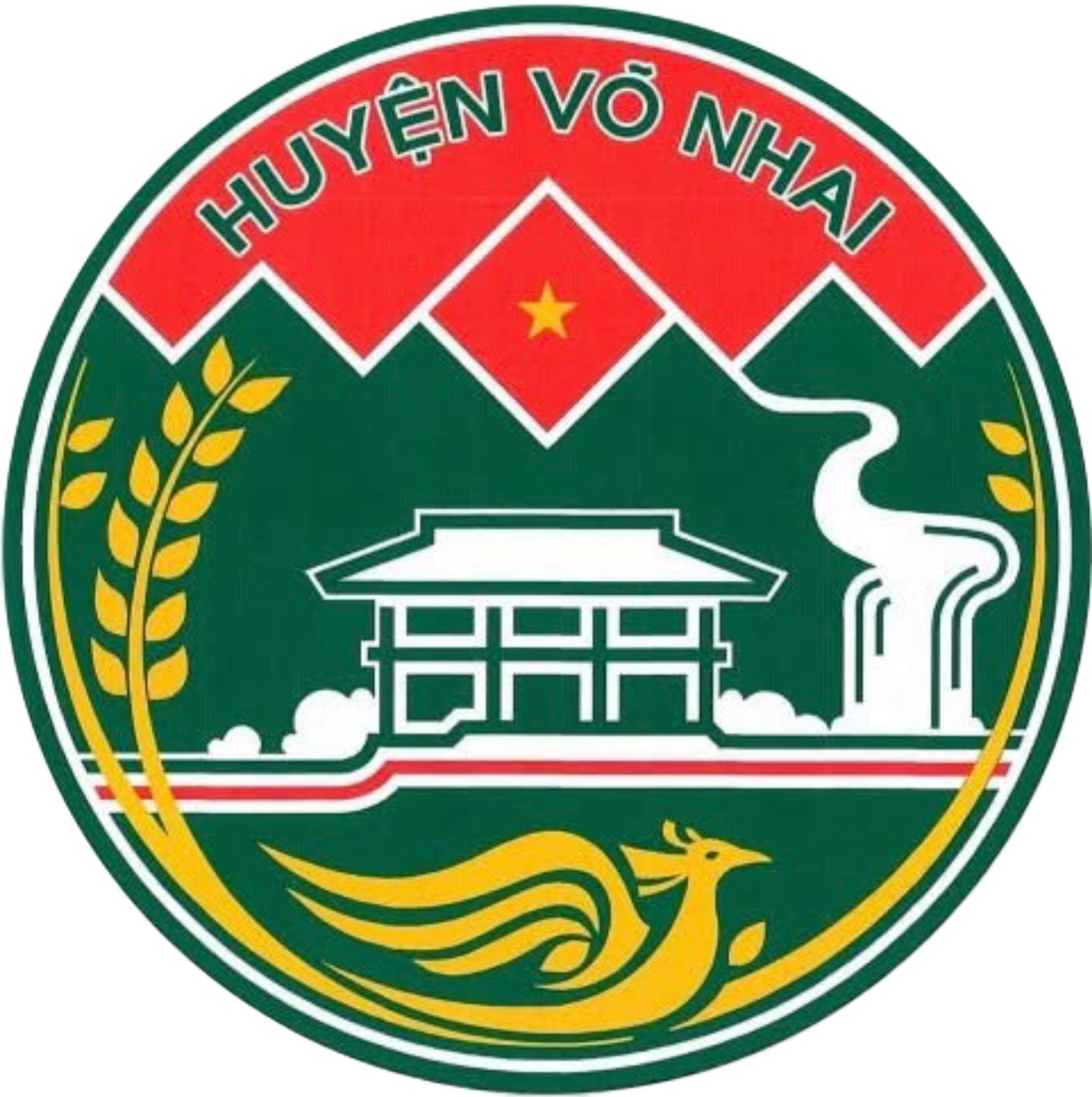
- Seal

- Location within Vietnam
- Coordinates: 21°47′14″N 106°02′29″E
- Country: Vietnam
- Region: Northeast
- Province: Thái Nguyên
- Capital: Đình Cả

Area
  - Total: 326 sq mi (845 km^{2})

Population (2003)
  - Total: 12,364
- Time zone: UTC+7 (UTC + 7)

Võ Nhai is a former rural district of Thái Nguyên province in the Northeast region of Vietnam. As of 2003 the district had a population of 12,364. The district covers an area of 845 km^{2}. The district capital lies at Đình Cả.

== Administrative divisions ==
Đình Cả, Bình Long, Cúc Đường, Dân Tiến, La Hiên, Lâu Thượng, Liên Minh, Nghinh Tường, Phú Thượng, Phương Giao, Sảng Mộc, Thần Sa, Thượng Nung, Tràng Xá, Vũ Chấn
