= Sông Công =

- 1-7 Square in Sông Công Ward
- Interactive map of Sông Công
- Coordinates: 21.466428°N 105.844164°E
- Country: Vietnam
- Province: Thái Nguyên
- Region: Northeast
- Seat: 2025

Area
  - Total: 13.98 km^{2} (5.40 sq mi)

Population (2025)
  - Total: 21,039
  - Density: 1,504/km^{2} (3,900/sq mi)
- Website: songcong.thainguyen.gov.vn

Sông Công is a ward in the southern part of Thái Nguyên, Vietnam. The ward inherited its name from the former Sông Công City.

== History ==
According to the 1927 census, Cải Đan Commune had a population of 327. In 1946, Cải Đan Commune and Lợi Xá Commune were merged to form Hoàng Long Commune, part of Phổ Yên District. In September 1949, Hoàng Long Commune was merged with Tiến Bộ Commune to form Hồng Tiến Commune. In September 1953, Hồng Tiến Commune was divided into Hồng Tiến and Thắng Lợi communes. In 1975, Thắng Lợi Commune was officially renamed Cải Đan Commune.

From the 1970s, the hilly area in the northwest of Phổ Yên District along the left bank of the Công River was developed into a large-scale mechanical industrial center. In 1972, Mỏ Chè Township was established in Phổ Yên District from part of the area and population of Thắng Lợi Commune.

The area of Cải Đan Commune became home to the majority of workers and civil servants employed in the industrial zone. Most workers came from provinces in the Red River Delta to settle there. Most factory workers and construction workers chose to remain and establish their lives in the area.

In 1985, the Council of Ministers decided to establish Sông Công Town, comprising Mỏ Chè Township and Cải Đan Commune from Phổ Yên District, and Tân Quang and Bá Xuyên communes from Đồng Hỷ District. Thắng Lợi Ward was also established from parts of the area and population of northwestern Cải Đan Commune, southern Tân Quang Commune, and western Bá Xuyên Commune.

At the time of its establishment, Sông Công Town consisted of three wards—Mỏ Chè, Lương Châu, and Thắng Lợi—and three communes—Cải Đan, Tân Quang, and Bá Xuyên. On 10 April 1999, the Government issued a decree establishing Phố Cò Ward from 4.65 km² of natural area and a population of 4,898 from Cải Đan Commune; establishing Vĩnh Sơn Commune from 4.10 km² of natural area and a population of 904 from Bá Xuyên Commune and 3.82 km² of natural area and a population of 1,119 from Cải Đan Commune; and establishing Cải Đan Ward from the remaining 5.33 km² of natural area and a population of 1,336 of Cải Đan Commune.

In June 2025, Sông Công Ward was established by merging the entire natural area and population of Thắng Lợi, Phố Cò, and Cải Đan wards of Sông Công City.
