= Yên Trạch =

New commune of Thái Nguyên

- Xã
- Interactive map of Yên Trạch
- Location in Vietnam
- Coordinates: 21°48′1″N 105°42′32″E
- Country: Vietnam
- Region: Northeast
- Province: Thái Nguyên

Government (2025)
  - Chairperson of the People’s Committee: Nguyễn Thu Hương

Area
  - Total: 43.51 sq mi (112.68 km^{2})

Population (2025)
  - Total: 23,543
- Time zone: UTC+07:00
- Website: yentrach.thainguyen.gov.vn

Yên Trạch is a commune in Thái Nguyên.

== History ==
In June 2025. the Standing Committee of the National Assembly of Vietnam passed Nghị quyết số 1683/NQ-UBTVQH15. In which, Yên Trạch would merge with Yên Đổ, and Yên Ninh.

== Geography ==
Yên Trạch borders:

- Chợ Mới commune and Phú Lương commune to the east
- Chợ Mới to the north
- Phượng Tiến commune and Trung Hội commune to the west
- Phú Lương and Hợp Thành commune to the south

Yên Trạch's current People's Committee center is located where Yên Đổ formerly put it (Phố Trào).
