= Linh Sơn, Thái Nguyên =

Coordinates: 21°37′N 105°50′E

Linh Sơn Phường Linh Sơn
- Ward
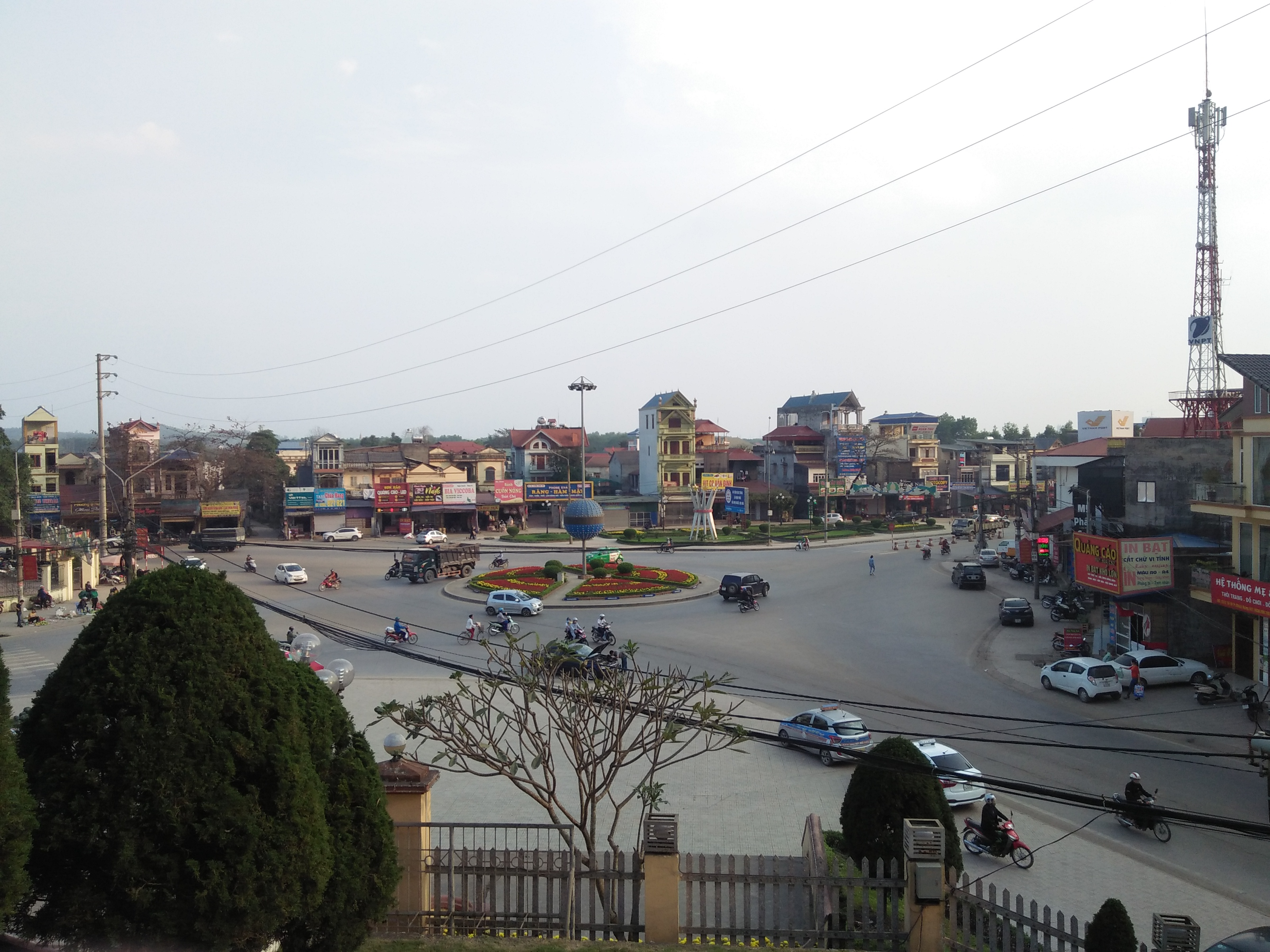
- Interactive map of Linh Sơn
- Country: Vietnam
- Province: Thái Nguyên
- Time zone: UTC+07:00 (Indochina Time)

Linh Sơn is a ward (phường) of Thái Nguyên Province, Vietnam. Previously, the ward was the townlet and is the capital of Đồng Hỷ district until the end of 2017.

The Standing Committee of the National Assembly promulgated Resolution No. 1683/NQ-UBTVQH15 on the rearrangement of commune-level administrative units of Thái Nguyên Province in 2025 (the Resolution takes effect from 16 June 2025). Accordingly, the entire natural area and population of Chùa Hang Ward, Đồng Bẩm Ward, and the communes of Cao Ngạn, Huống Thượng, and Linh Sơn are rearranged to form a new ward named Linh Sơn Ward.
