= Đại Phúc =

Coordinates: 21°38′N 105°39′E

- Commune
- Interactive map of Đại Phúc
- Country: Vietnam
- Province: Thái Nguyên
- Founded: 2013

Area
  - Total: 565 sq mi (1,463 km^{2})

Population (2018)
  - Total: 25.051
  - Density: 4.43/sq mi (1.712/km^{2})
- Time zone: UTC+07:00
- Website: hungson.daitu.thainguyen.gov.vn

Đại Phúc is a commune (xã) of Thái Nguyên Province, in northeastern Vietnam.

In June 2025, Đại Phúc Commune was established through the merger of the entire natural area and population of Phúc Xuân Commune (natural area: 18.50 km²; population: 6,219) and Phúc Trìu Commune (natural area: 20.68 km²; population: 6,759) of Thái Nguyên City; Tân Thái Commune (natural area: 19.68 km²; population: 4,442) and Hùng Sơn Township (natural area: 14.52 km²; population: 18,135) of Đại Từ District; and Phúc Tân Commune (natural area: 34.09 km²; population: 3,665) of Phổ Yên City.
