= An Khánh, Thái Nguyên =

Coordinates: 18°47′N 105°41′E

An Khánh
- Commune
- Interactive map of An Khánh
- Location in Vietnam An Khánh (Southeast Asia) An Khánh (Asia)
- Country: Vietnam
- Province: Thái Nguyên

Area
  - Total: 5.58 sq mi (14.46 km^{2})

Population (1999)
  - Total: 5,550
- Time zone: UTC+07:00 (Indochina Time)
- Website: ankhanh.daitu.thainguyen.gov.vn

An Khánh is a commune in Thái Nguyên Province, Vietnam. The local economy is mainly agricultural, with rice production and cattle breeding. An Khánh is located near the Khánh Hoà coal mine and Bá Sơn coal mine. In the commune, there is currently An Khánh 1 thermal power plant and Quan Triều Cement Factory.
