= Công River =

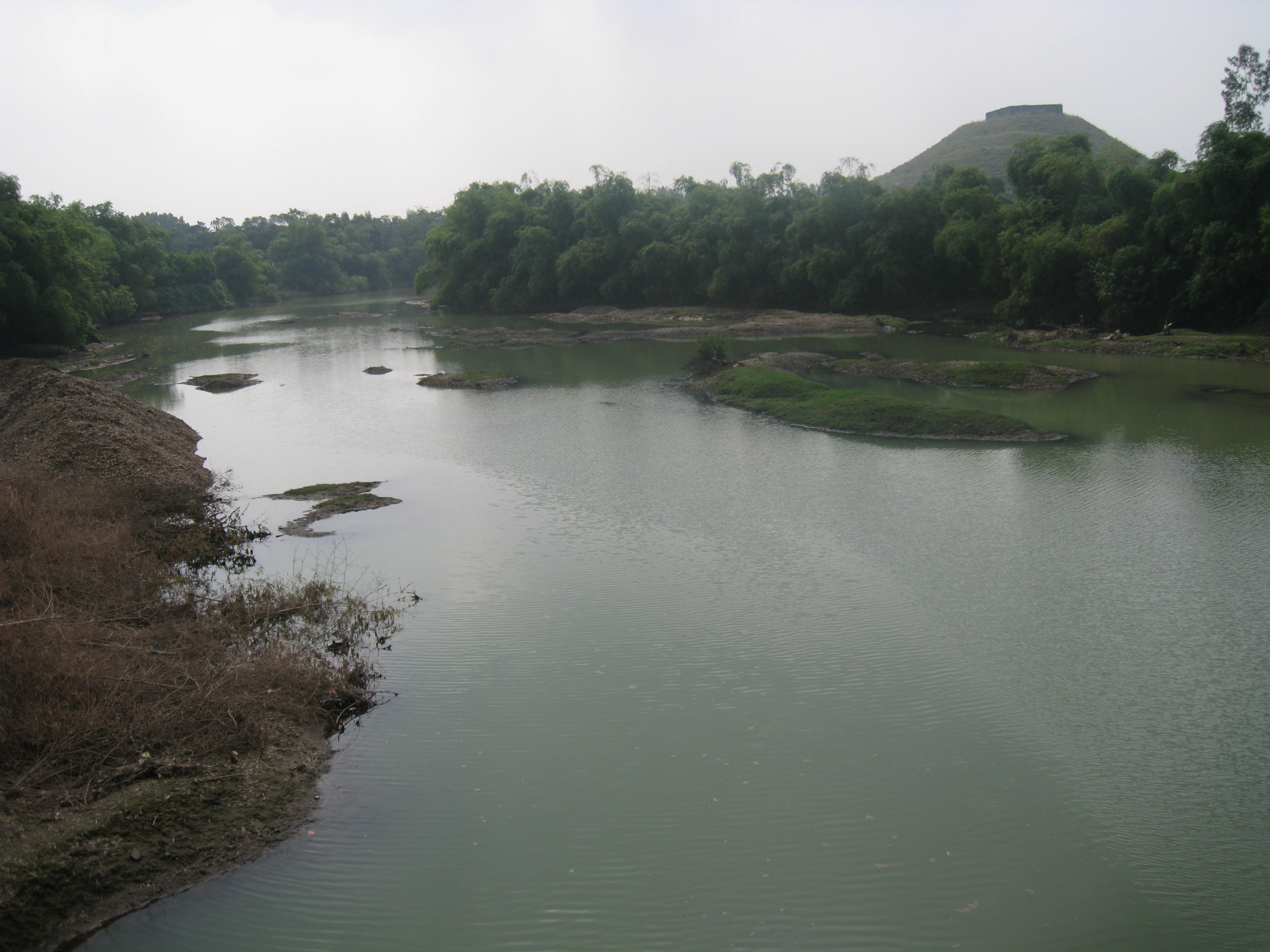
- Công River at Sông Công

Location
- Country: Vietnam

Physical characteristics
- Length: 96 km (60 mi)

Basin features
- River system: Cầu River

The Công River (Vietnamese: Sông Công), also known as Giã River, is a tributary of the Cầu River in northern Vietnam. It flows through Thái Nguyên province. The river is 96 km in length and has a catchment area of 951 square kilometres. It flows from Núi Cốc Lake and also passes through the town of Sông Công.
