= Núi Pháo mine =

Tungsten mine in Thái Nguyên, Vietnam

Nui Phao mine
- Location within Vietnam
- Location: Thái Nguyên Province, Vietnam; 21°38′55″N 105°40′7″E
- Products: Tungsten
- Company: Masan Group

The Nui Phao mine is a large open pit mine located in the northern part of Vietnam in Thái Nguyên Province. Nui Phao represents one of the largest tungsten reserves in Vietnam having estimated reserves of 55.4 million tonnes of ore grading 0.21% tungsten.
