= Thái Nguyên (city) =

- Provincial city (Class-1)
- Thái Nguyên City; Thành phố Thái Nguyên
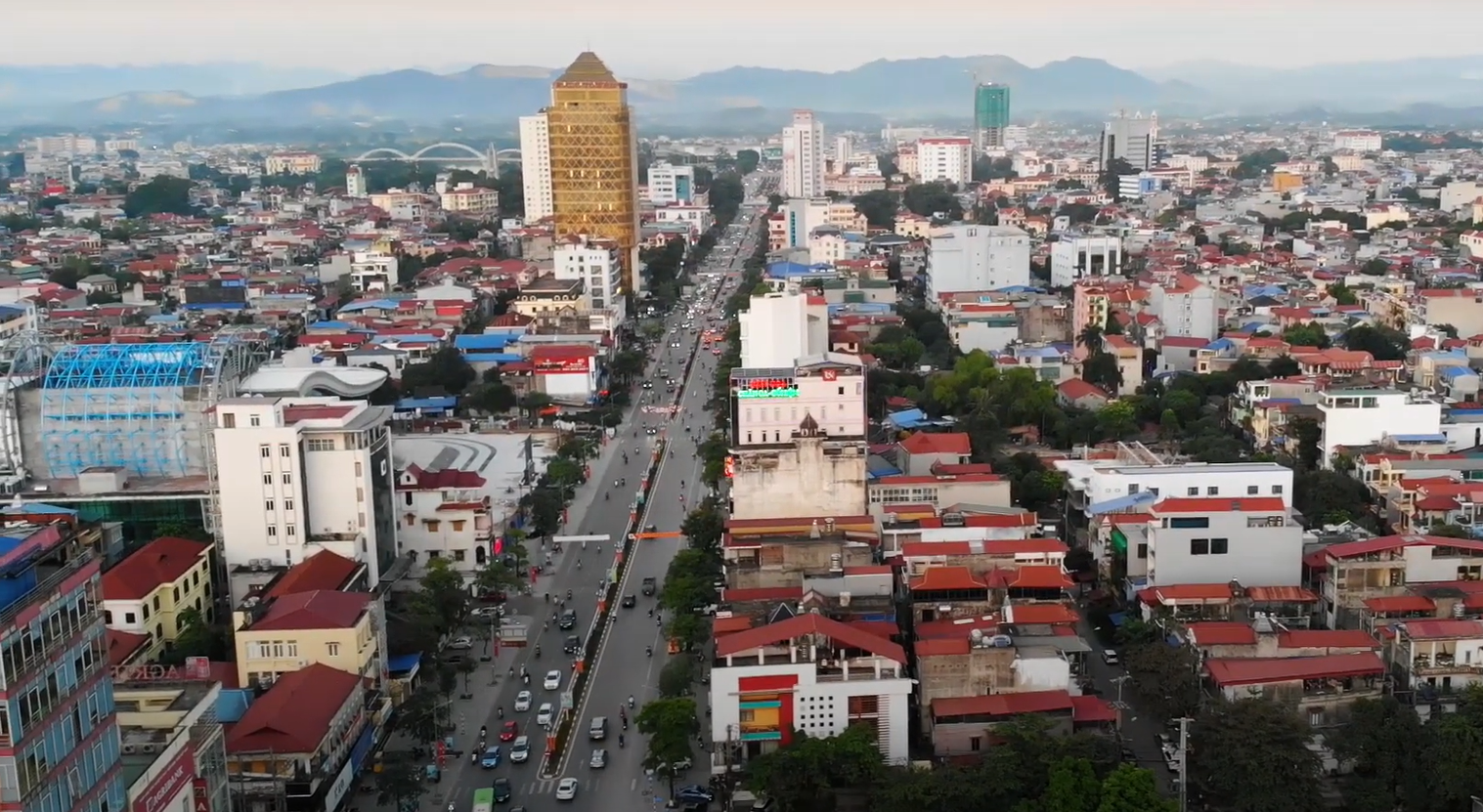
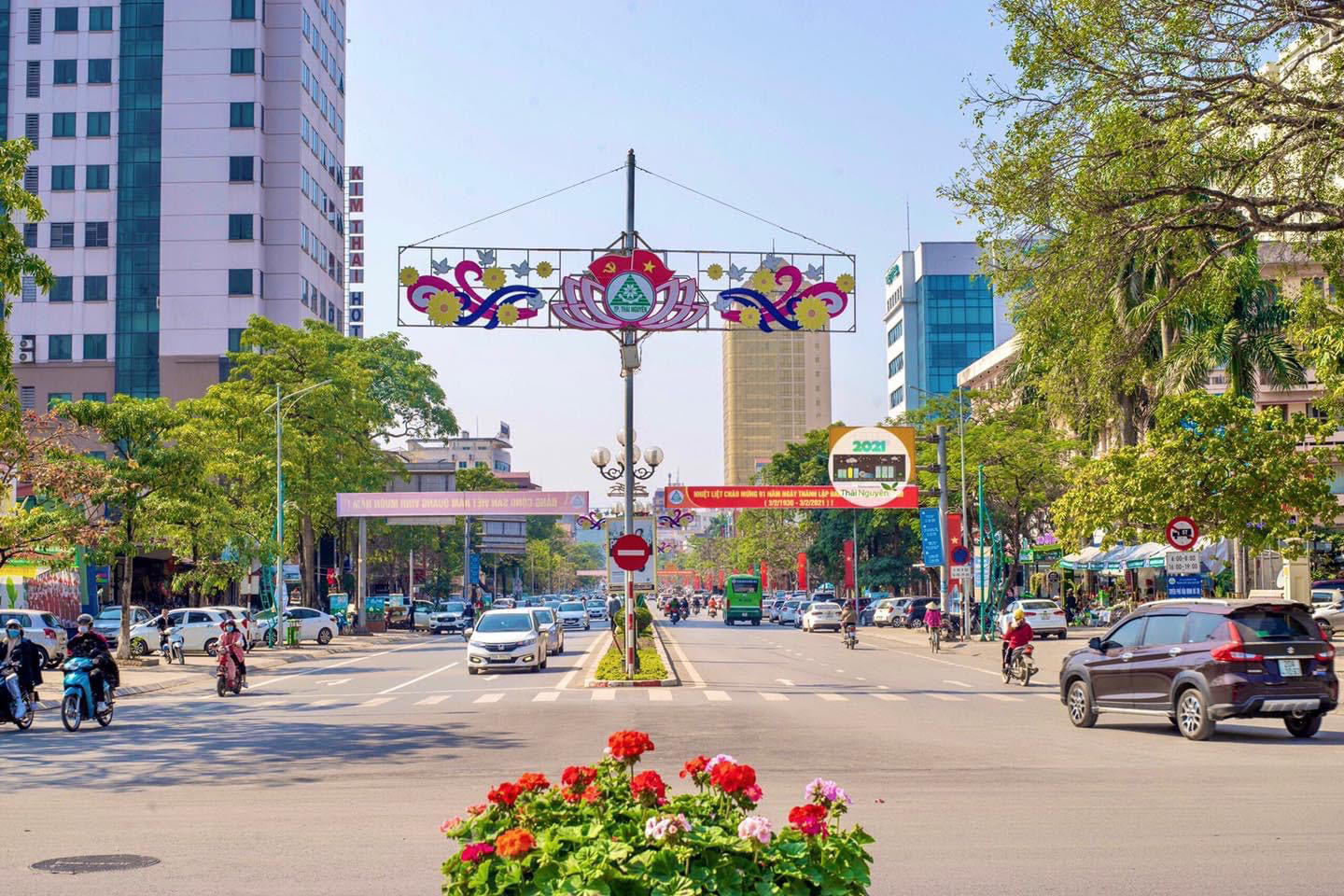
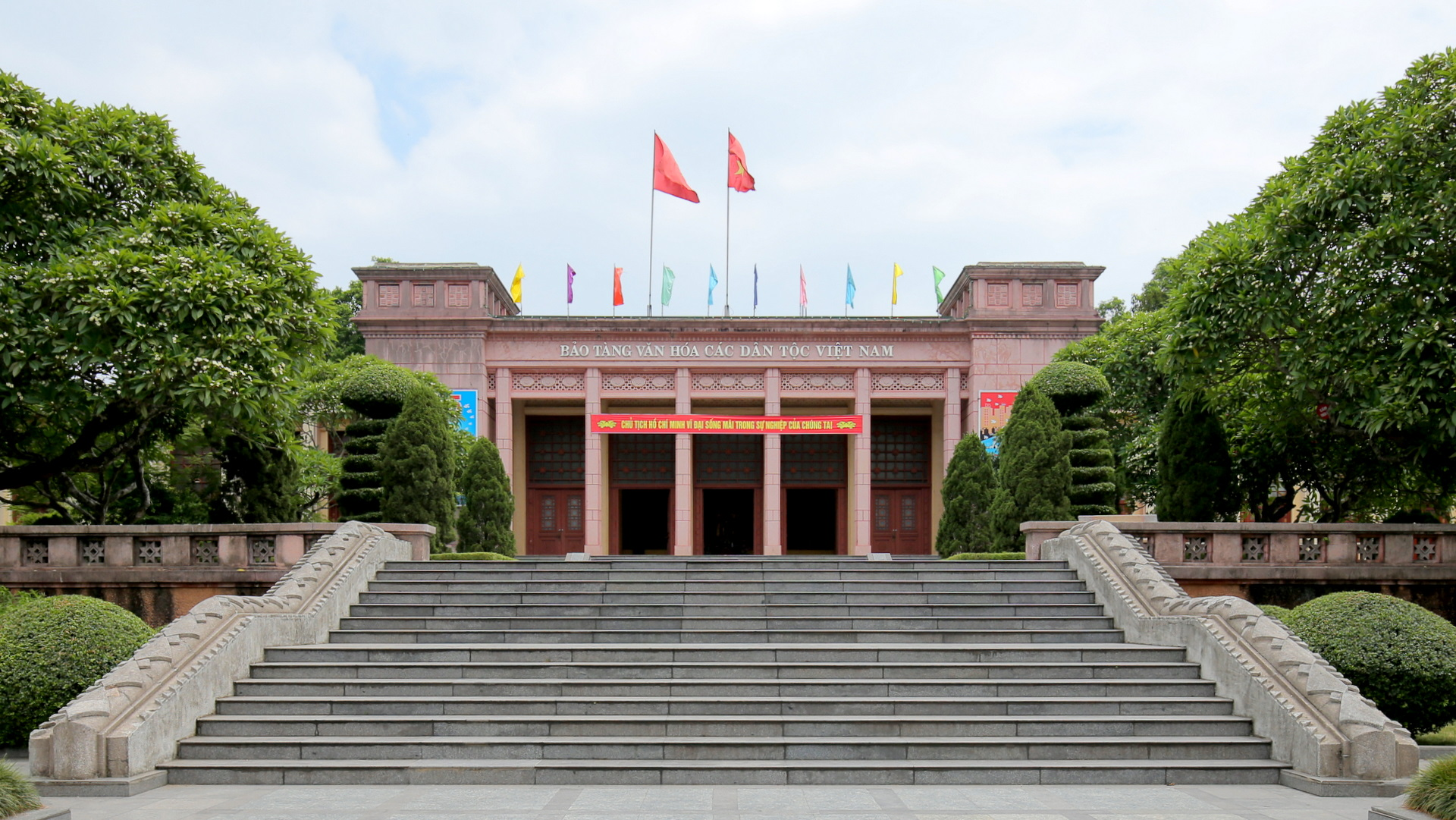
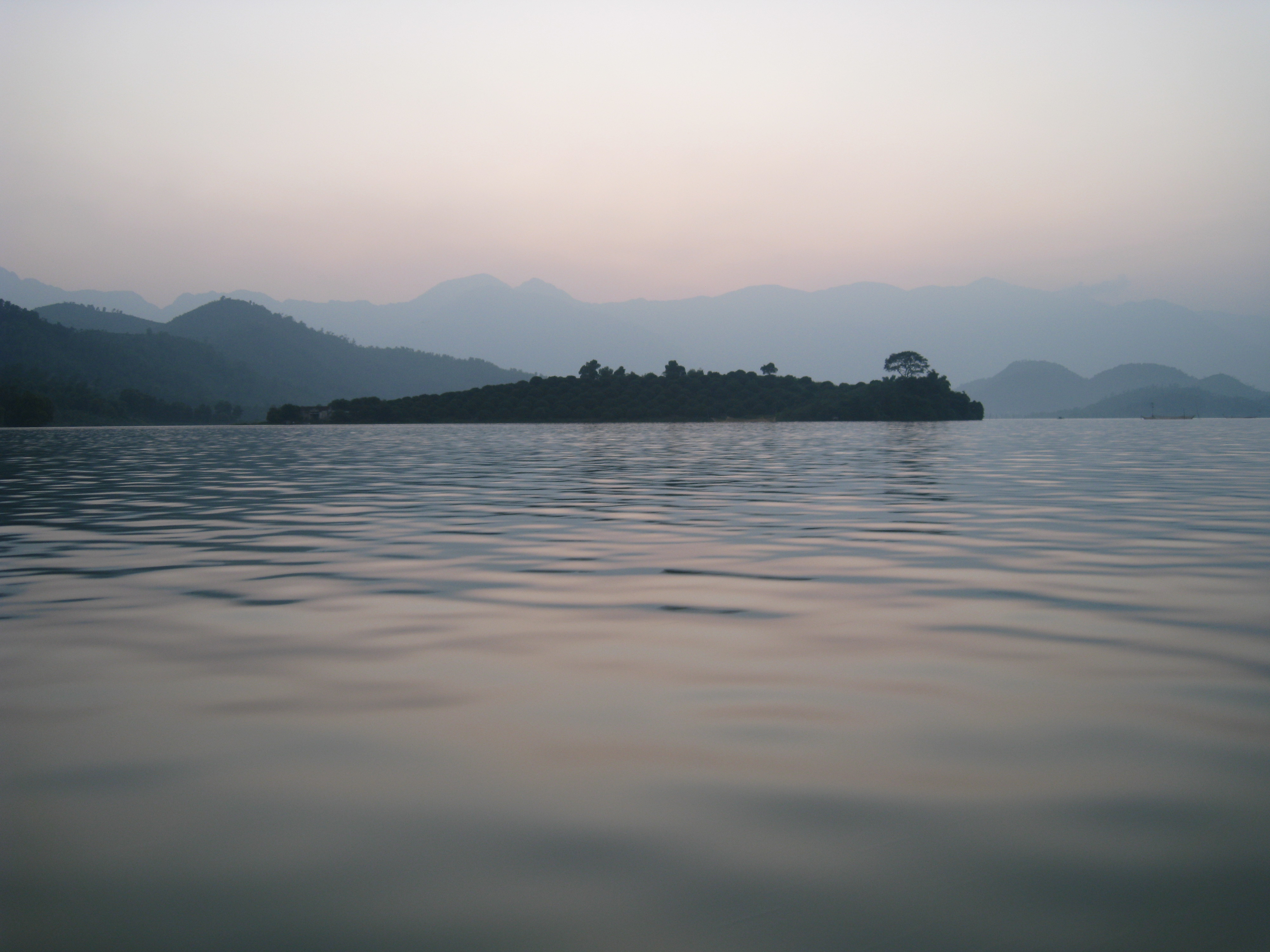
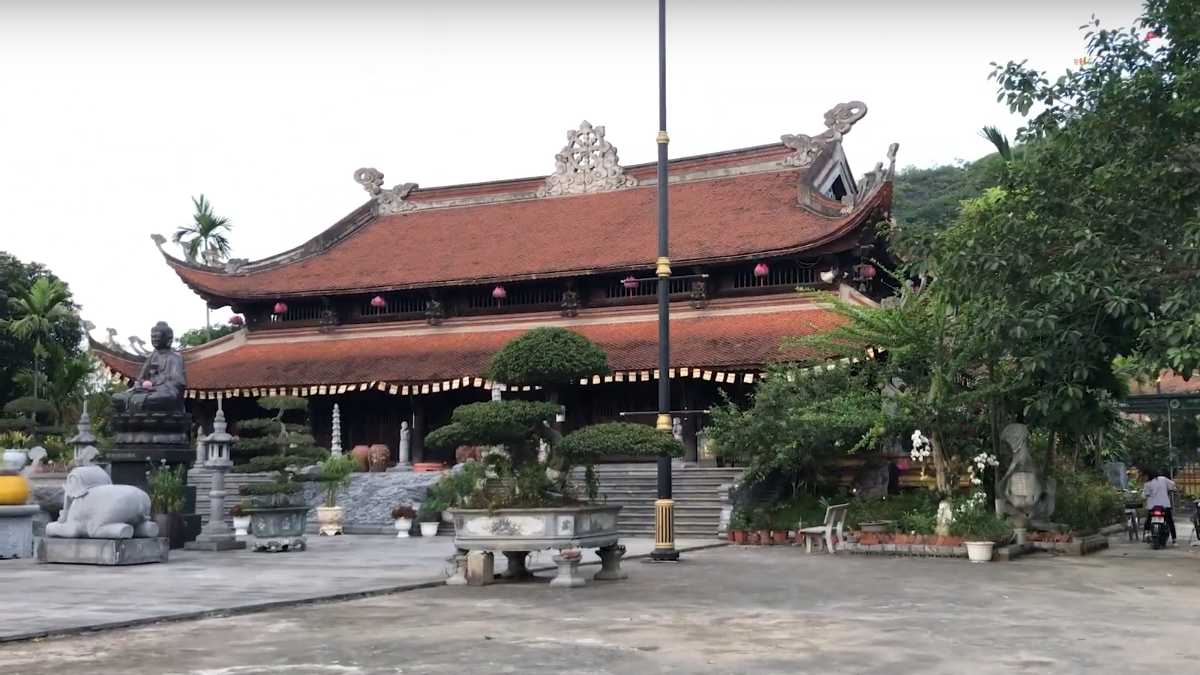
- From top to bottom, from left to right: View of Thái Nguyên, city center, Museum of Vietnamese Ethnic Culture, Hồ Núi Cốc, Hang Pagoda

- Seal
- Nickname: Thép City
- Interactive map of Thái Nguyên
- Location of in Vietnam
- Coordinates: 21°36′N 105°51′E
- Country: Vietnam
- Province: Thái Nguyên Province
- Founded: October 19, 1962

Government
  - Chairman of the People's Committee: Trịnh Việt Hùng
  - Chairman of the People's Council: Phạm Hoàng Sơn

Area
  - Total: 170.7 km^{2} (65.9 sq mi)

Population (2018)
  - Total: 420,000
  - Density: 1,860/km^{2} (4,800/sq mi)
- Climate: Cwa
- Website: thainguyencity.gov.vn

Thái Nguyên is a former city in Vietnam. It is the capital and largest city of Thái Nguyên Province. The city is listed as a first class city and is the ninth largest city in Vietnam. It has long been famous throughout Vietnam for its Tân Cương tea, among the most recognized Vietnamese tea regions. In 1959, it became the site of Vietnam's first steel mill, and is now home to a large and growing major regional university complex.

== History ==
The city played an important role in Vietnam's struggles for independence during the French colonial era.

The Thái Nguyên uprising in 1917 was the "largest and most destructive" anti-colonial rebellion in French Indochina between the Pacification of Tonkin in the 1880s and the Nghe-Tinh Revolt of 1930–31. In August 1917, Vietnamese prison guards mutinied at the Thai Nguyen Penitentiary, the largest one in the region. With the aid of the freed inmates – common criminals as well as political prisoners – and weapons captured from the provincial arsenal, the rebels were able to take control of local government offices. They then established a fortified perimeter, executed French colonial officials and local collaborators, and called for a general uprising. Although they were only able to hold the city for five days, French forces were not able to pacify the surrounding countryside until six months later, leaving heavy casualties on both sides.

During the First Indochina War, the province played an important role as a safe area (abbreviated ATK in Vietnamese for An Toan Khu, 安全区) for the Viet Minh. In 1956 the town became the headquarters of the northernmost military region, called Việt Bắc, until reunification in 1975.

Originally a small township including four residential quarters, two towns, and six communes with a combined population of approximately 140,000, Thái Nguyên became a city on 19 October 1962. Before that date, the area was a part of Đồng Mô commune, Đồng Hỷ district.

== Administrative divisions ==
Thái Nguyên City includes 21 wards and 11 communes.

=== Wards ===
- Trưng Vương
- Thịnh Đán
- Tân Long
- Quan Triều
- Quang Vinh
- Quang Trung
- Hoàng Văn Thụ
- Đồng Quang
- Phan Đình Phùng
- Túc Duyên
- Tân Thịnh
- Gia Sàng
- Tân Lập
- Phú Xá
- Cam Giá
- Trung Thành
- Hương Sơn
- Tân Thành
- Tích Lương
- Chùa Hang
- Đồng Bẩm

=== Communes ===
- Tân Cương
- Phúc Trìu
- Phúc Xuân
- Thịnh Đức
- Phúc Hà
- Cao Ngạn
- Đồng Bẩm
- Quyết Thắng
- Đồng Liên
- Huống Thượng
- Linh Sơn

== Geography ==
Thái Nguyên City is located on the Cầu River. Its area is approximately 189.705 km^{2} (73.246 sq mi) and the population was 420,000 in 2018.

== Climate ==
Climate data for Thái Nguyên
Month	Jan	Feb	Mar	Apr	May	Jun	Jul	Aug	Sep	Oct	Nov	Dec	Year
Record high °C (°F)	31.2 (88.2)	33.5 (92.3)	35.7 (96.3)	39.4 (102.9)	40.7 (105.3)	40.8 (105.4)	39.2 (102.6)	38.5 (101.3)	37.9 (100.2)	35.3 (95.5)	34.0 (93.2)	30.6 (87.1)	40.8 (105.4)
Mean daily maximum °C (°F)	19.7 (67.5)	20.6 (69.1)	23.0 (73.4)	27.3 (81.1)	31.5 (88.7)	32.8 (91.0)	32.8 (91.0)	32.5 (90.5)	31.8 (89.2)	29.4 (84.9)	25.8 (78.4)	22.1 (71.8)	27.5 (81.5)
Daily mean °C (°F)	16.0 (60.8)	17.3 (63.1)	20.0 (68.0)	23.8 (74.8)	27.2 (81.0)	28.6 (83.5)	28.7 (83.7)	28.2 (82.8)	27.3 (81.1)	24.8 (76.6)	21.2 (70.2)	17.6 (63.7)	23.4 (74.1)
Mean daily minimum °C (°F)	13.7 (56.7)	15.3 (59.5)	18.0 (64.4)	21.5 (70.7)	24.2 (75.6)	25.7 (78.3)	25.7 (78.3)	25.4 (77.7)	24.3 (75.7)	21.7 (71.1)	18.0 (64.4)	14.7 (58.5)	20.7 (69.3)
Record low °C (°F)	3.0 (37.4)	4.3 (39.7)	6.1 (43.0)	12.6 (54.7)	16.4 (61.5)	19.7 (67.5)	20.5 (68.9)	21.7 (71.1)	16.3 (61.3)	10.2 (50.4)	7.2 (45.0)	3.2 (37.8)	3.0 (37.4)
Average rainfall mm (inches)	28.0 (1.10)	31.1 (1.22)	60.1 (2.37)	111.5 (4.39)	237.3 (9.34)	306.3 (12.06)	399.4 (15.72)	336.5 (13.25)	227.2 (8.94)	123.2 (4.85)	52.7 (2.07)	24.3 (0.96)	1,937.1 (76.26)
Average rainy days	10.1	12.0	17.7	16.7	15.1	16.3	18.0	18.1	13.2	9.8	7.2	6.1	160.0
Average relative humidity (%)	79.4	81.4	84.4	85.3	81.8	82.3	83.5	84.7	82.3	79.8	78.0	76.6	81.6
Mean monthly sunshine hours	64.1	44.8	42.2	78.2	163.4	159.8	182.0	177.4	182.8	161.6	138.5	113.3	1,508.1
Source: Vietnam Institute for Building Science and Technology

== Commerce and industry ==
Thái Nguyên City has long been famous throughout Vietnam for the quality of its green tea, with Tân Cương Commune producing the most widely recognized brand. Since 2007 it has shipped an average of about 22,000 tonnes of tea domestically and 7,500 tonnes overseas, to Algeria, France, Iran, Iraq, Japan, Pakistan, and Taiwan. In an effort to boost exports, the city hosted its First International Tea Festival in November 2011. The effort seems to have paid off. During the first five months of 2012, it exported 49,000 tonnes, an increase of over 15% from the prior year, with Pakistan its biggest customer.

In 1959, the city also became the center of a nascent metallurgical industry, with the creation of Thái Nguyên Iron and Steel Company (TISCO), thanks to its ample local resources of iron ore and coal. The new mill produced its first cast iron in November 1963. In 2009, it was converted from a wholly government-owned enterprise to a partially privatized joint-stock company. By 2011, its output reached 230,000 tonnes of pig iron and 400,000 tonnes of steel ingots. Although its primary production mills are located just south of Thai Nguyen City, it now has 17 branches and 6,000 employees, with another 8 partially owned subsidiaries in 9 northern provinces. It has won many national awards and now exports steel to Cambodia, Canada, Indonesia, Laos, and other countries overseas. Masan Group also operates a tungsten mine in Dai Tu District.

Samsung Electronics has their largest mobile phone factory in Thai Nguyen, employing over 60,000 people. The factory has operated since 2014 and has an area of 100 ha.

Thai Nguyen’s export experienced a ten-fold increase to over US$23 billion in the 2013 – 2017 period. The province hosted nearly 7,200 businesses in 2020 with a combined capital value approaching US$5.4 billion.

As per Thai Nguyen’s Department of Industry and Trade, for the first three quarters of 2020, the province’s total industrial gross output exceeded US$27 billion, while the domestic economic sector achieved US$1.8 billion. Both of these were over 70 percent of the province’s annual target. In the same period, foreign-invested enterprises generated close to US$23 billion, an increase of 2.3 percent over the previous year.

Among the province’s industries, the electronics and high-tech domains delivered the best results. Their production increased by over 16 percent year-on-year for laptops, while earphone manufacturing grew by five percent.

The socioeconomics of Thai Nguyen has seen remarkable development. In the first three quarters of 2020, industry and construction covered nearly 60 percent of the province’s economy while the services sector accounted for roughly one-third of the economy. In the same period, the province’s GDP per capita reached US$4,260, while industrial production rose by over 16 percent, and local exports grew by over 13 percent.

Thai Nguyen has also experienced significant development in infrastructure and labor productivity. Recently, the province experienced an influx of sustainable ventures. In 2020, over ten investment certificates were granted to eco-friendly and energy-efficient ventures, with a combined worth of over US$30 million.

Over the past decade, Thai Nguyen attracted a considerable amount of foreign direct investment. Samsung’s establishment of a mobile phone manufacturing complex in the province has dramatically boosted Thai Nguyen’s FDI. The province achieved over 13 percent compound annual growth rate (CAGR) during the 2015–2020 period.

As per the Foreign Investment Agency (FIA), in August 2020, the province hosted over 172 foreign-invested projects. Together these enterprises added over US$8 billion in registered capital. This made Thai Nguyen among the country’s top 10 localities in terms of international investment inflow.

In a bid to attract investors with industrial expertise, the province is concentrating on improving the local investment climate. Thai Nguyen has prioritized timely issuance of government policies, guidance, and support for financiers. Local authorities have also shown a keen interest in high technology industries and ancillaries.

In December 2020, Hong Kong’s electronic firm, DBG Technology, was awarded an investment certificate by provincial authorities to set up a US$80 million manufacturing facility. This facility will manufacture laptops, cameras, phones, audio equipment, and home appliances. It is expected to generate a revenue of US$110 million annually, employing over 10,000 workers.

In the same month, China’s Trina Solar received Thai Nguyen’s approval to produce photovoltaic cells and solar power. With investment exceeding US$200 million, this facility has a planned capacity of over 250 million products a year. The plant is expected to begin operations from June 2021 and add over 1,800 jobs.

In November 2020, South Korean touchscreen manufacturer Samju Vina, injected capital to add a second plant in Thai Nguyen. This funding should raise its regional production per month from 20 million to 35 million units.

For enhancing its overall competitiveness, Thai Nguyen is actively encouraging the private and high-tech sectors to develop production clusters and connect value chains.

On Vietnam's Provincial Competitiveness Index 2023, a key tool for evaluating the business environment in Vietnam’s provinces, Thai Nguyen received a score of 67.48. This was a slight improvement from 2022 in which the province received a score of 66.1. In 2023, the province received its highest scores on the ‘time costs’ and ‘law and order’ criteria and lowest on ‘transparency’ and ‘policy bias’.

Industrial zones

Thai Nguyen’s six industrial parks are spread over 1400 hectares of land area, five of which have already received funding. The province is promoting infrastructure investment in its 105-hectare Quyet Thang Hi-Tech Industrial Park that is situated eight kilometers away from Thai Nguyen city center.

The province’s plans include 35 industrial clusters with an area of nearly 1,260 hectares. The province has called for investment in 11 of these clusters, which have a planned area of over 280 hectares. The province aims to attract investment in secondary industries that complement the Samsung group and increase its localization degree.

Specifically, industries in electronics, electric, software, high precision mechanical, and textile are favored. The investment locations promoted by Thai Nguyen include the industrial zones in Yen Binh, Diem Thuy, and Song Cong. These, along with the province-wide industrial clusters, are equipped with appropriate technical infrastructure to establish enterprises.

To raise funds, Thai Nguyen provincial authorities encouraged investors to lease land for 50 years for a one lump sum payment. Consequently, these efforts led to the collection of US$65 million to develop industrial parks.

The Diem Thuy Industrial Park is one such example and features 77 projects with combined investment exceeding US$1.1 billion. This park’s projects are modern, eco-friendly, and employ over 20,000 locals.

== Education ==
=== Universities ===
Thái Nguyên University (TNU) is one of the major regional university systems in Vietnam, serving the entire northern mountain region with more campuses than any city except Hanoi and Ho Chi Minh City. In 1994, these many centers of learning were united under one general administration. Its components include seven Colleges (Education, Engineering and Technology, Agriculture and Forestry, Economics and Techniques, Economics and Business Administration, Medicine and Pharmacy, Communication and Technology), a School of Foreign Languages, and an International School. Other components are a teaching hospital, a publishing house, three research institutes, and a center for national defense education, a center for international cooperation, a center for human resource development for foreign language studies, and the office of the president. TNU is also home to one of four national Learning Resource Centers, the others being in Hanoi, Huế, Ho Chi Minh City, and Can Tho. TNU offers undergraduate, postgraduate, and vocational education, as well as research and extension services.
