= Núi Cốc Reservoir =

- Núi Cốc Lake
- Hồ Núi Cốc (Vietnamese)
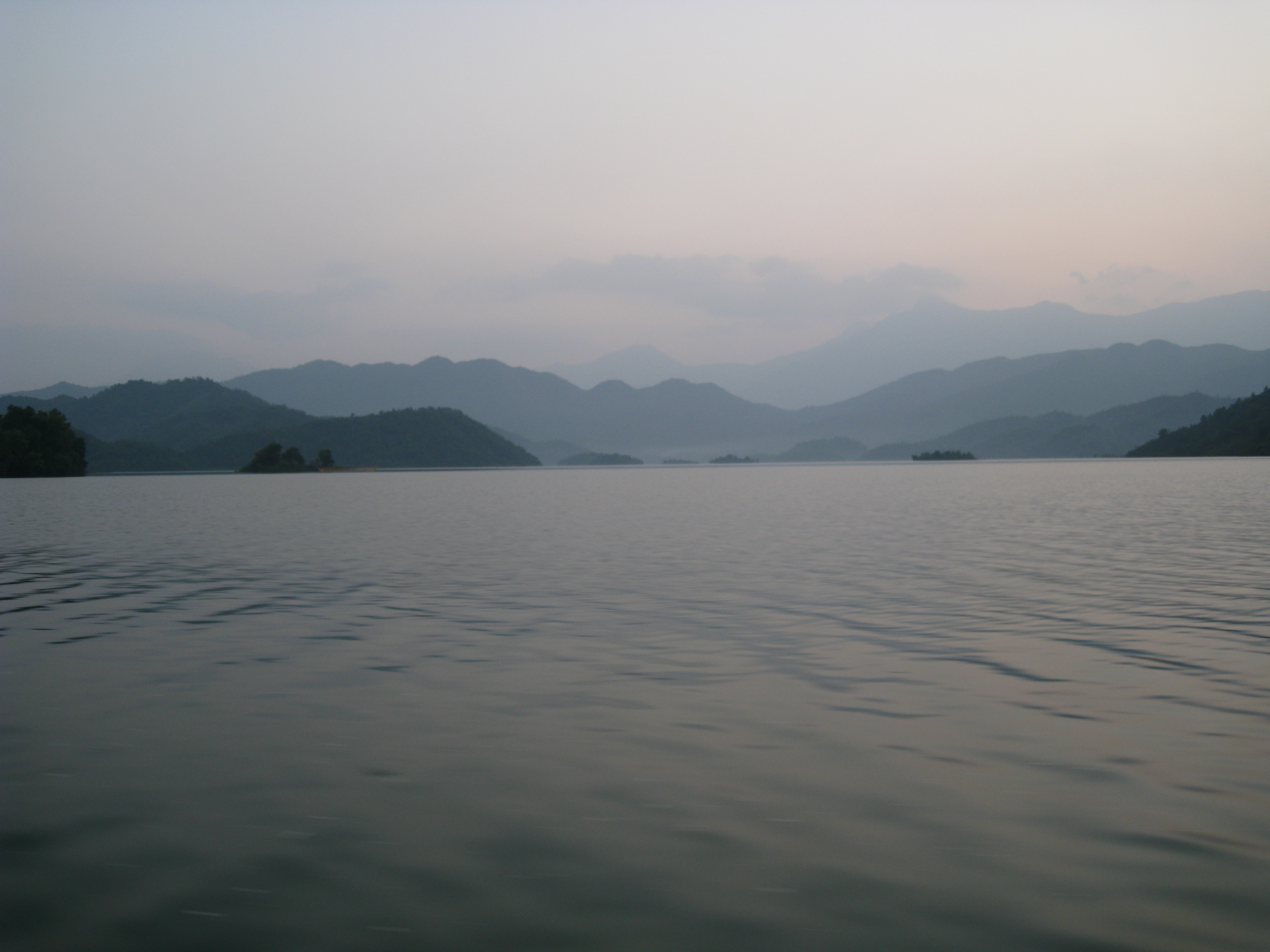
- Nui Coc Lake and surrounding mountains

- Location within Vietnam
- Coordinates: 21°34′46″N 105°41′38″E
- Type: Reservoir
- Primary inflows: Công River
- Basin countries: Vietnam
- Surface area: 2,500 hectares (6,200 acres)
- Average depth: 23 metres (75 ft)
- Islands: 89 islets
- Settlements: Thái Nguyên

Núi Cốc Reservoir (Vietnamese: Hồ Núi Cốc) is an artificial lake, approximately 25 kilometres (16 mi) west of the city of Thái Nguyên in Thái Nguyên Province, Vietnam, in Tam Đảo National Park. It is a popular visitor attraction on account of the legend associated with the 89 islands within the lake.

== Geography ==
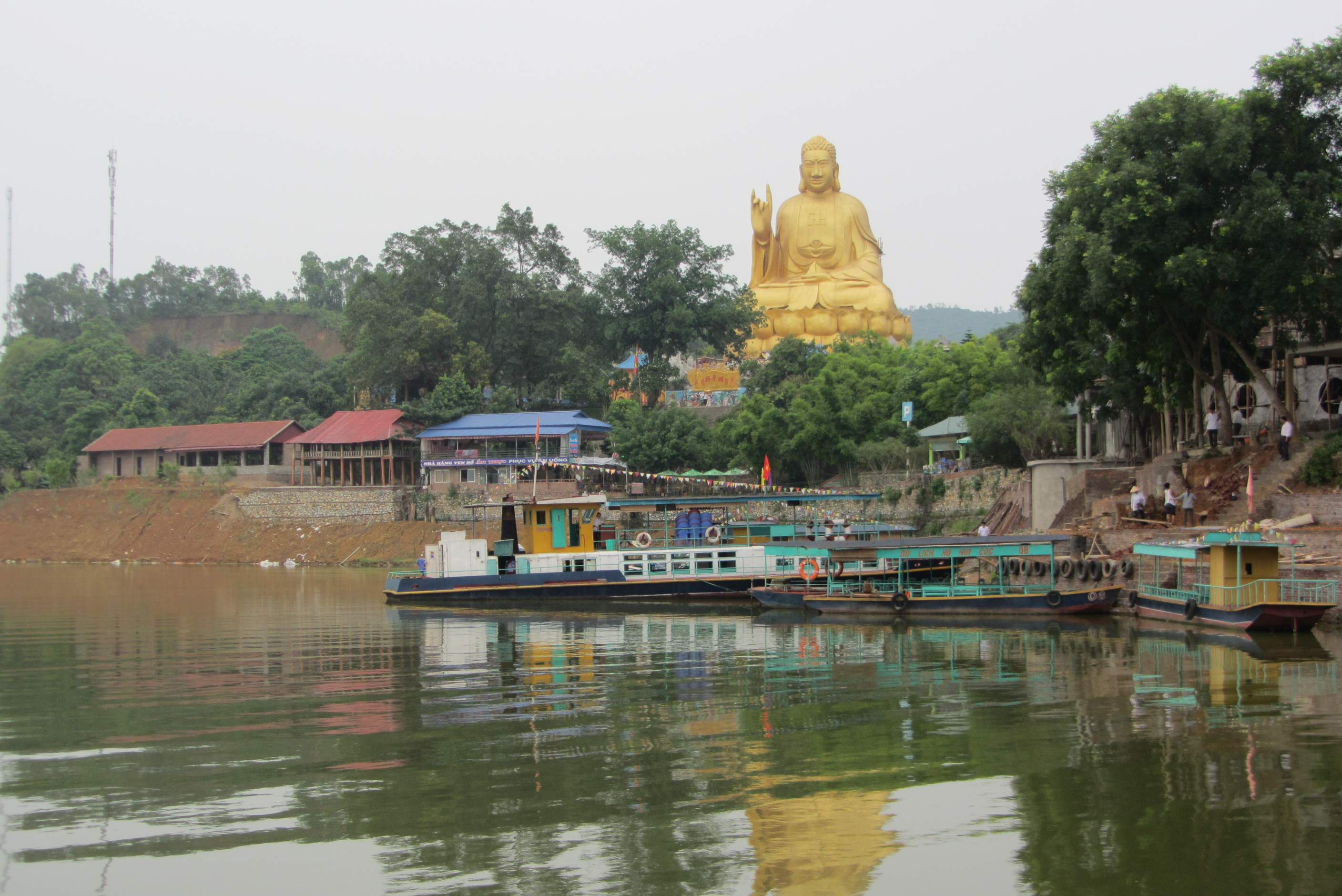
Giant Buddha statue and tourboats in ecopark

The lake is located in the scenic backdrop provided by the Coc Mountain (Vietnamese: Núi Cốc). The lake was created on the Công River, a tributary of the Cầu River. The lakeshore is divided into two areas, namely the northern bank and the southern bank. The northern bank has many upscale guest houses built on slopes of the hill amidst green trees, known as keo la cham. There is a water park and also an artificial dinosaur park on this bank.

== Lake and its precincts ==
The lake has an area of 2,500 hectares (6,200 acres) with 23 metres (75 ft) deep waters with a storage capacity of 175 million cubic metres. A circular motor boat ride around the lake is an attraction.

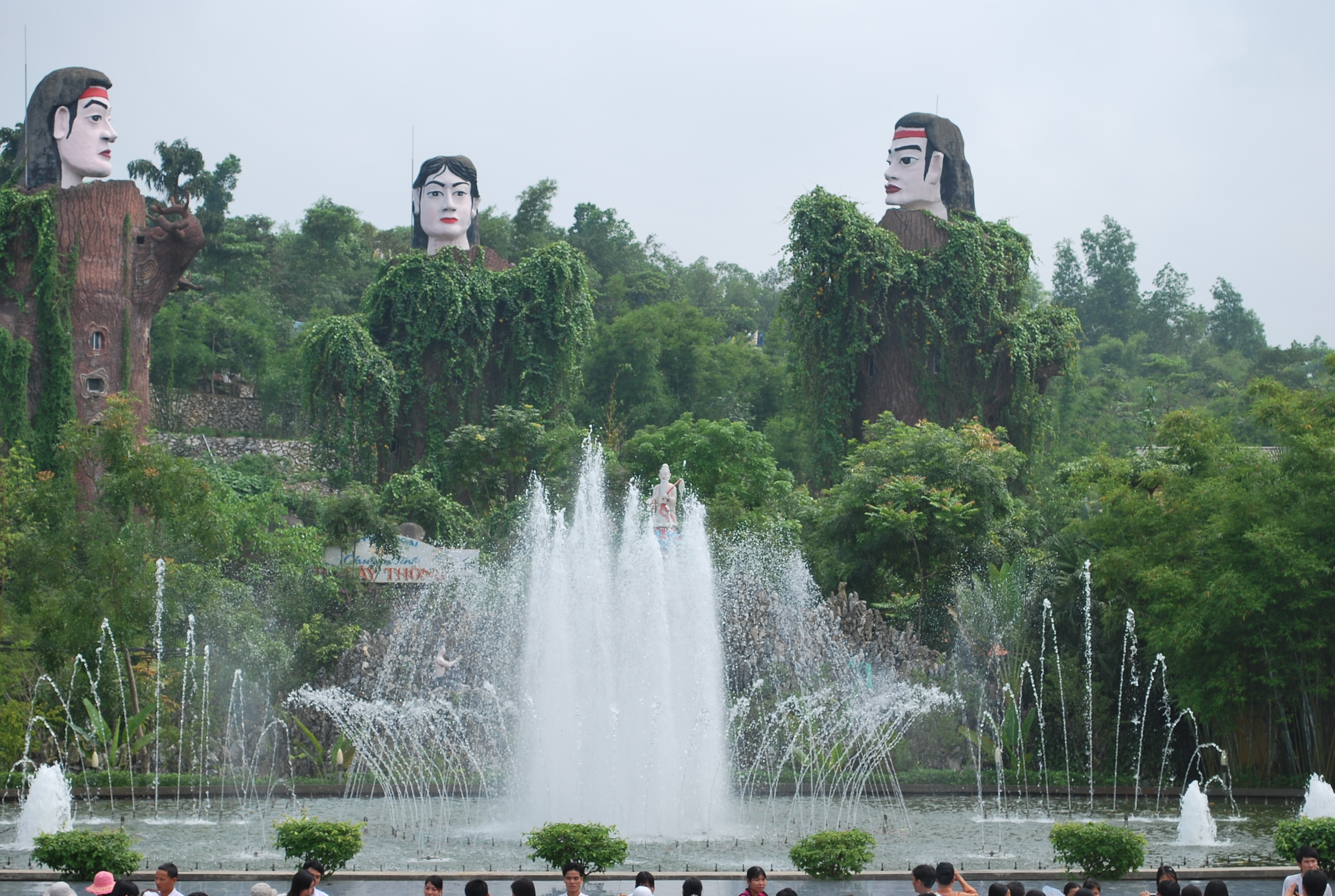
Musical fountains in the ecopark

An ecotourism park was also developed in March 2007 with musical fountains. The Tourism Trade Union Joint Stock Co. has invested VND 15 billion in this eco-tourism park in an area of 1 hectare (2.5 acres). The main fountain raises to a height of over 40 metres (130 ft) with several subsidiary fountains, which presents a spectacular sight. The water fall of the fountain is accompanied by the music played on the khen, a musical instrument of the local ethnic people. The park has an animal reservation enclosure where animals such as alligators, ostriches and bears are reared and protected.

Other attractions in the park are: a 'Fairy Tale House Underworld and Water park' with a total area of about 6 hectares (15 acres); an artificial cave system, a large fish statue; in one of the large islands of 89 islets in the lake Vietnamese traditional culture is on display with 2061 cultural and historical items, which include the Bodhisattva of Compassion with thousands of hands and eyes. The flora found in the lake precincts are Rhodomyrtus tomentosa, Melastoma candidum, Cratoxylon spp. and many more. The lake precinct (reservoir area) also is home for 40 species of birds and 15 species of mammals. Duck species seen in the island within the lake during the winter are: Dendrocygna javanica, Anas crecca and A. acuta. A small breeding centre of Ardeola bacchus and Egretta spp. has also been established on an island within the lake. Since a very large number of storks and many other birds, are seen in an island in the lake, it is also known as "Stork Island", and another island in the lake where large number of goats has been named as 'Goat Island'.

== Legend ==
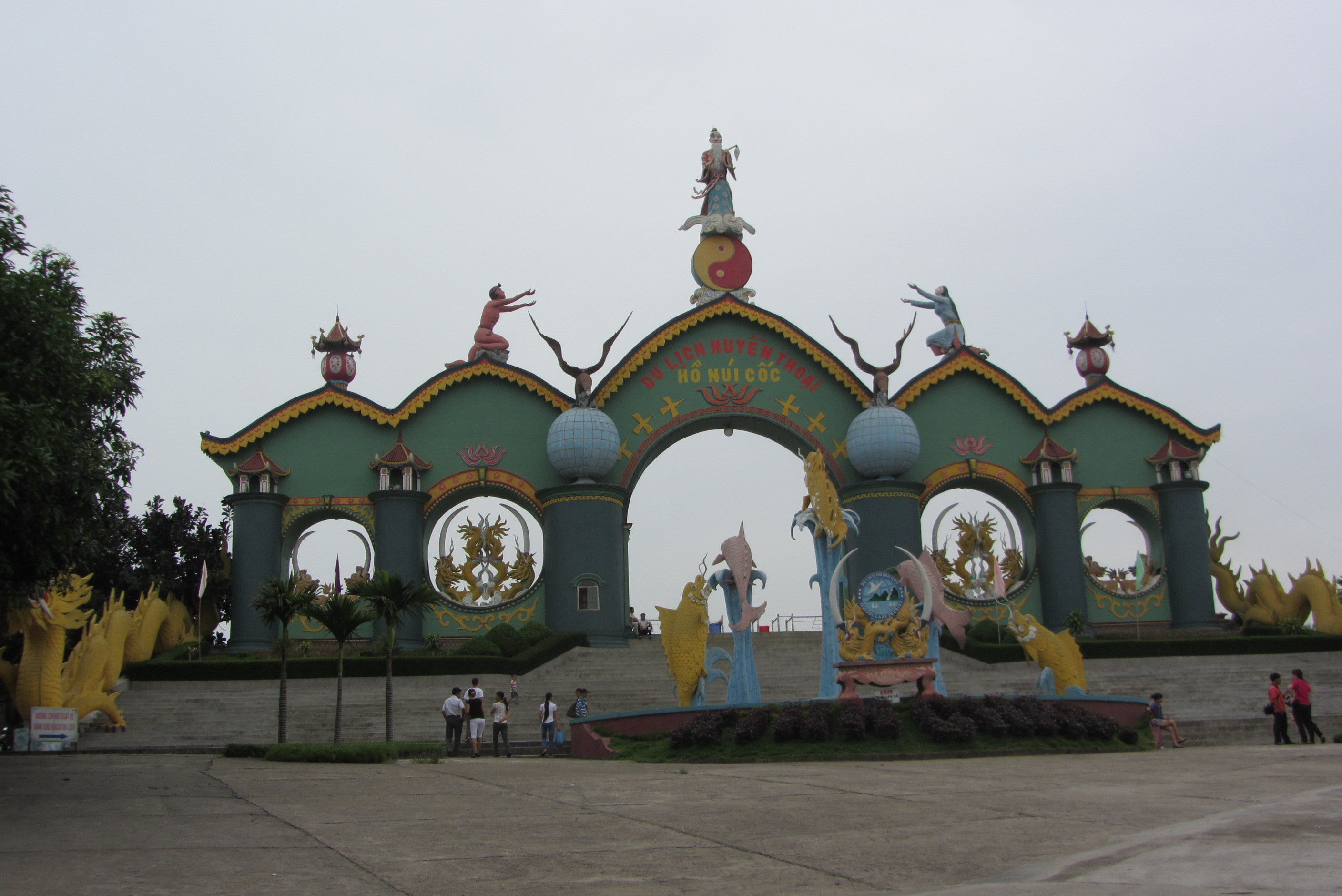
Gateway to the ecopark

Nui Coc Lake is the subject of a legend about 'Coc', a boy from a poor family, and 'Cong', a girl from a rich mandarin family. Despite being deeply in love with each other, Coc was not allowed to marry Cong due to the difference in their social status. Despondent, broken-hearted and pining for his lover, Coc played the flute to call Cong to his room, but she was not allowed to leave the house to meet him. Coc eventually died, whereupon fairies took pity on him and transformed him into Coc Mountain, which now surrounds the lake. When Cong heard of her lover's fate, she began to cry, day and night. Her love was sincere and loyal, and she cried so much that it resulted in her dying and transforming into tears, which seeped to the ground and started flowing as a stream called the 'Cong River' (which feeds the lake) in search of her fiancé. During the summer season every year violet sim (rose myrtle) flowers bloom in the Coc mountain hill and the Nui Coc Lake. The legend is also extended to the province, which is named as Tan Cuong. Further, it is said that the famous Tan Cuong tea grown here has absorbed Cong's tears in its roots created the sweet flavor of the tea.

== Uses ==
The lake waters have been put to several beneficial uses. These are for:

Irrigation

The lake was initially conceived for irrigation, in 1977. The reservoir storage provides for irrigation through a canal system for 13,000 hectares (32,000 acres) of wetland cultivation. Apart from recreational activities, the reservoir is also used for aqua culture. Fish production is reported to be 120–150 tonnes (260,000–330,000 lb) per year.

Nui Coc lake and hydropower

The lake waters are used for hydropower generation at a small power station with 3 units of 630 KW capacity each, on a canal head of an irrigation canal that takes off from the reservoir. The energy generation is about 2 MWh. The irrigation system was built in 1977. However, the power plant construction on the irrigation canal was started in Jan 2008 and the plant commissioned in Jan 2010. A 22 kV transmission line evacuates the power generated to a nearby grid.

== Gallery ==
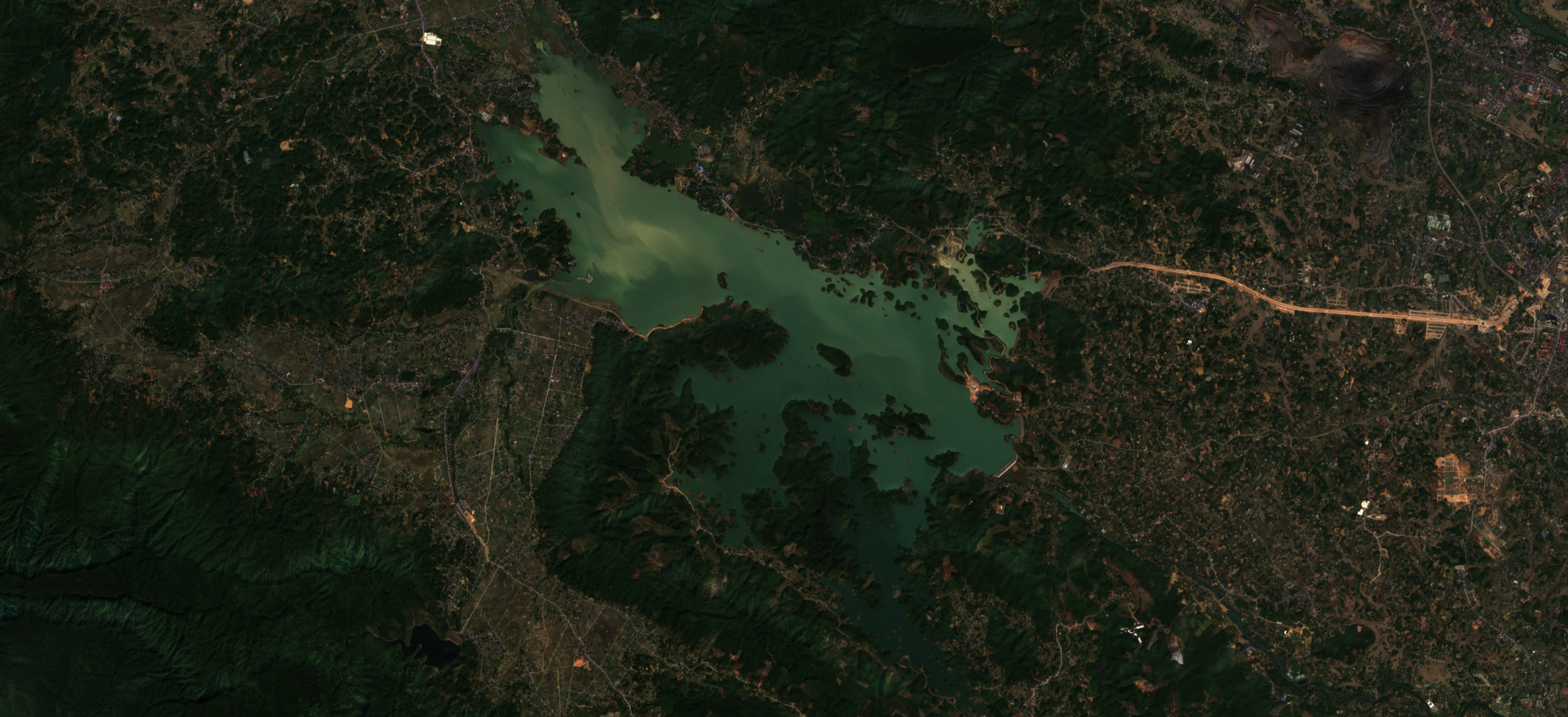
Satellite image of Núi Cốc Lake area

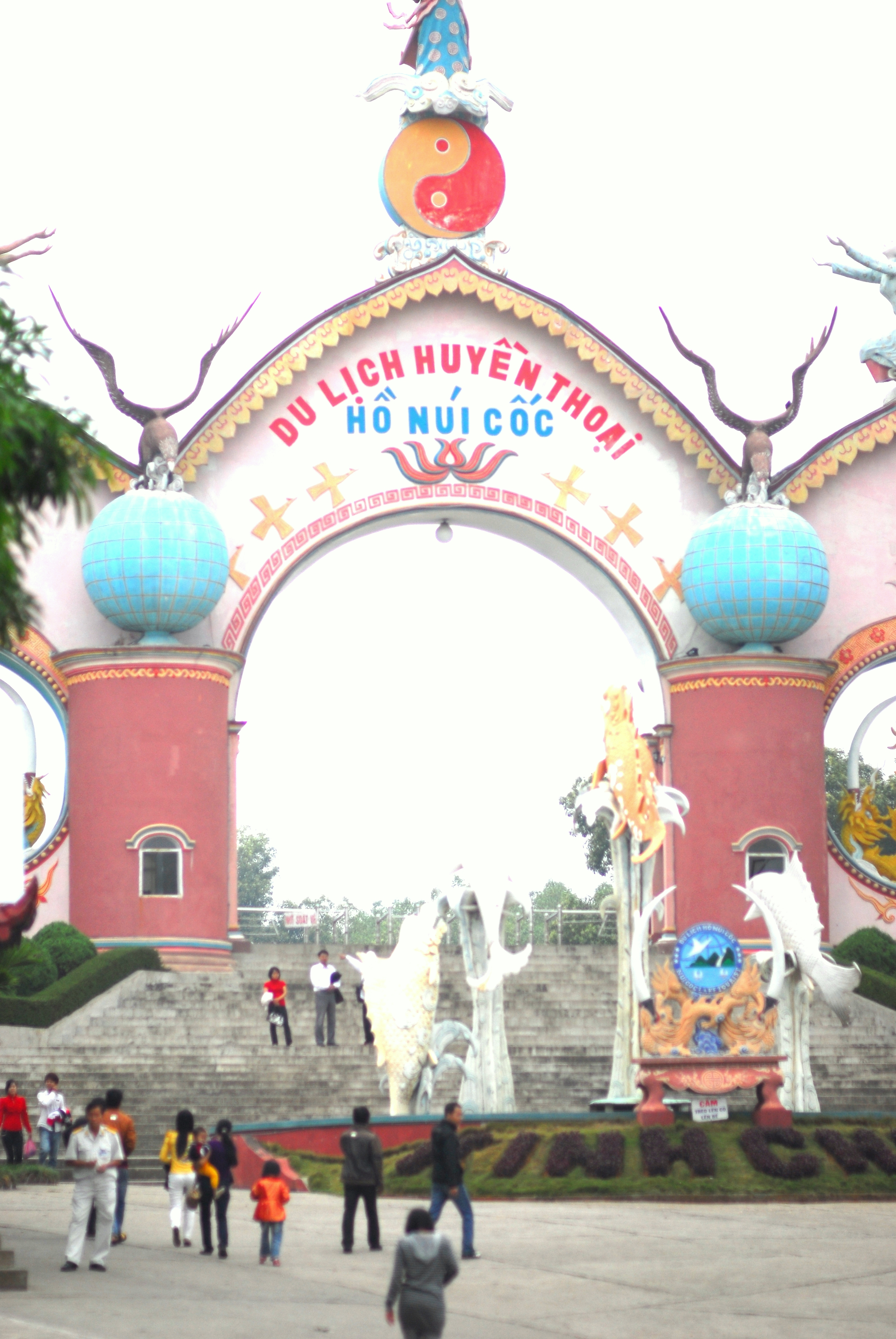
Núi Cốc Lake tourist area gate

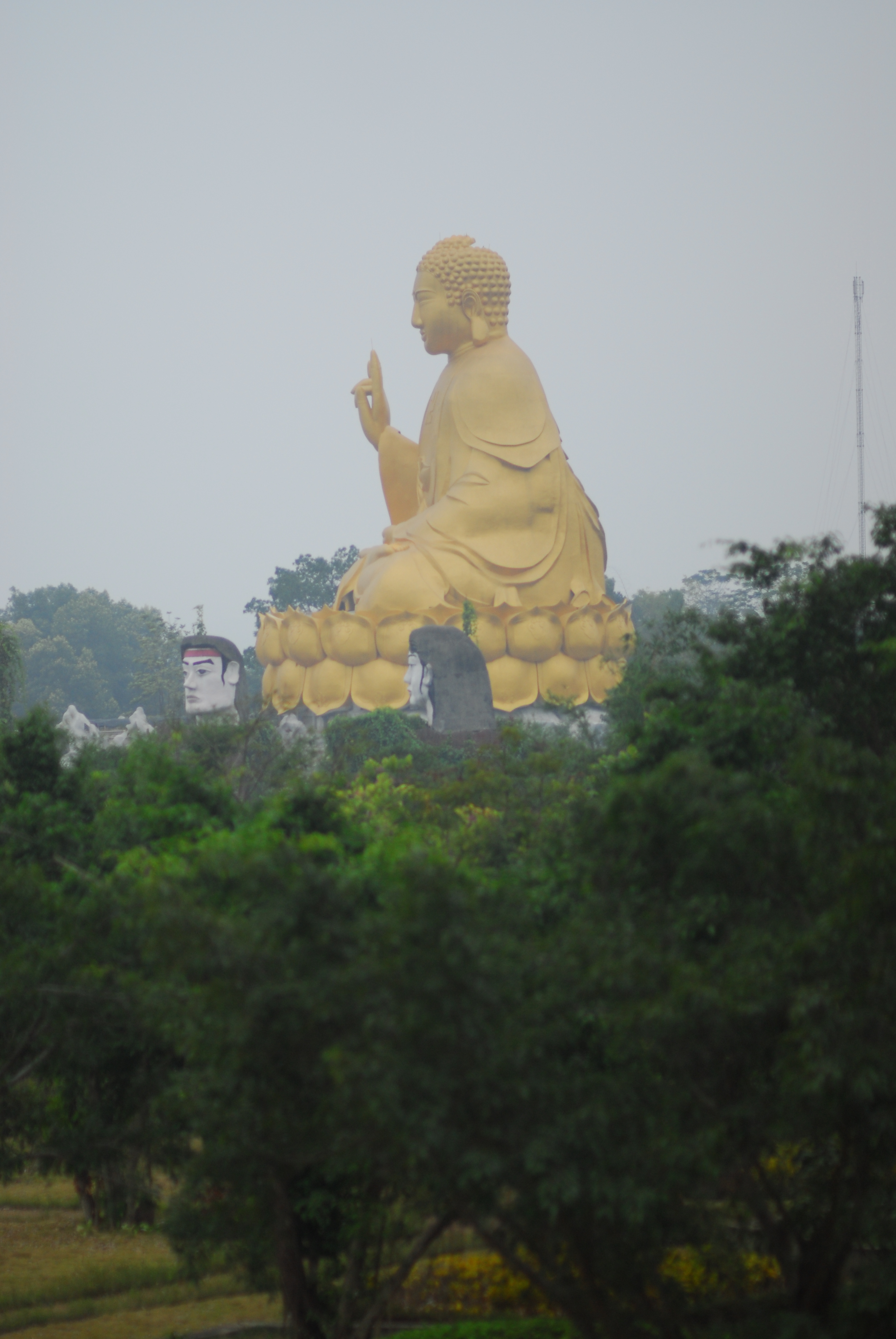
Buddha statue

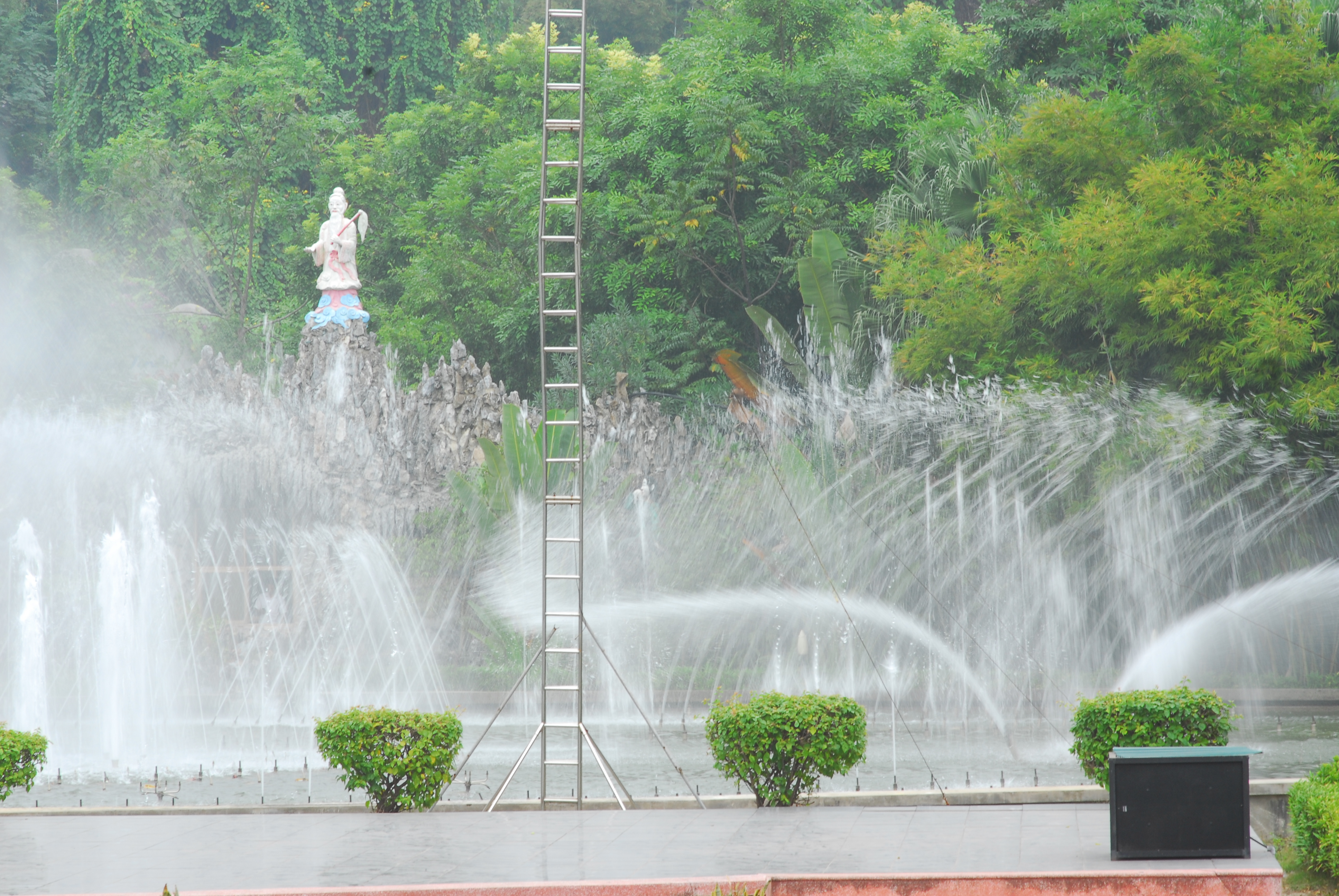
Water music performance

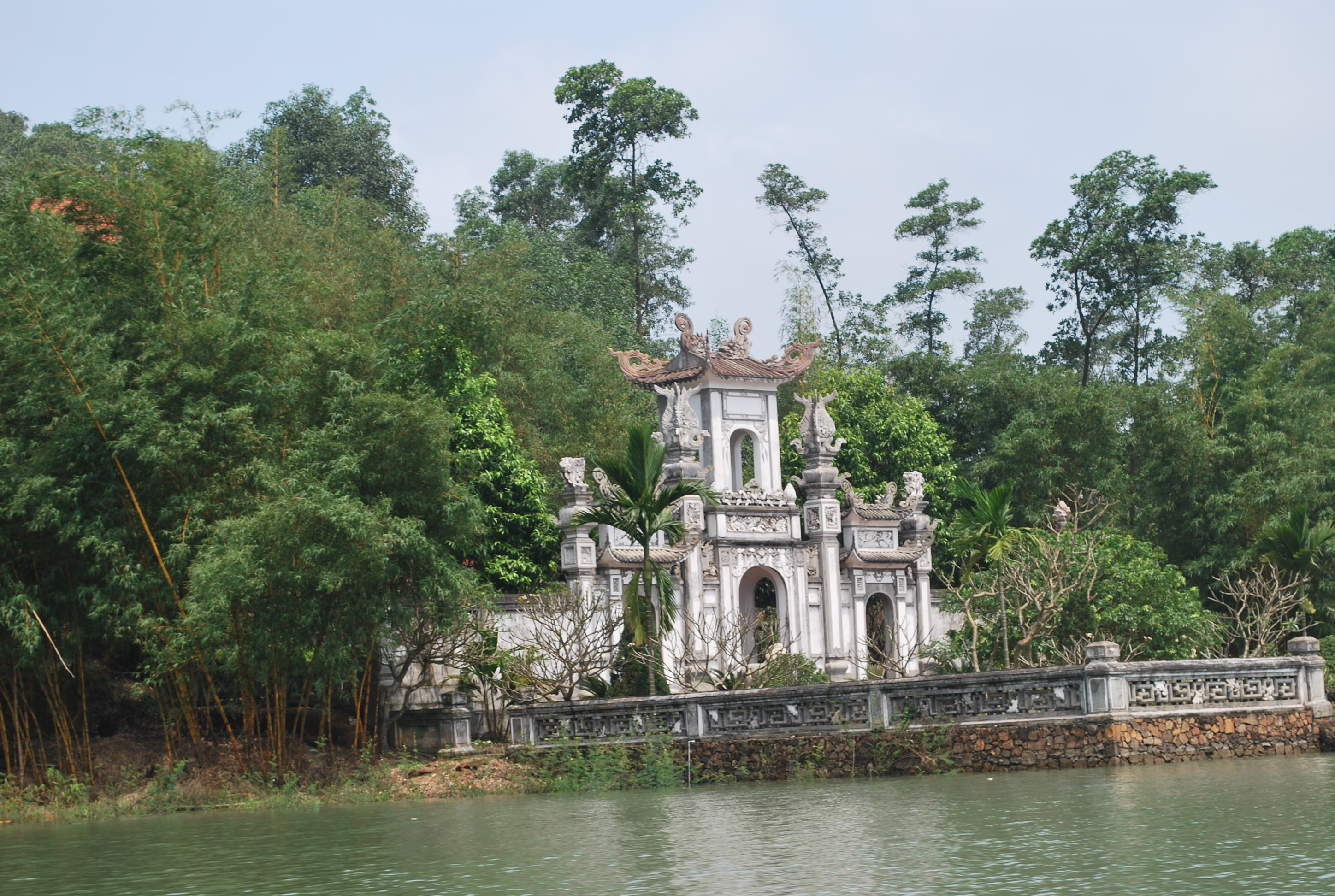
Main gate to 200 year old house

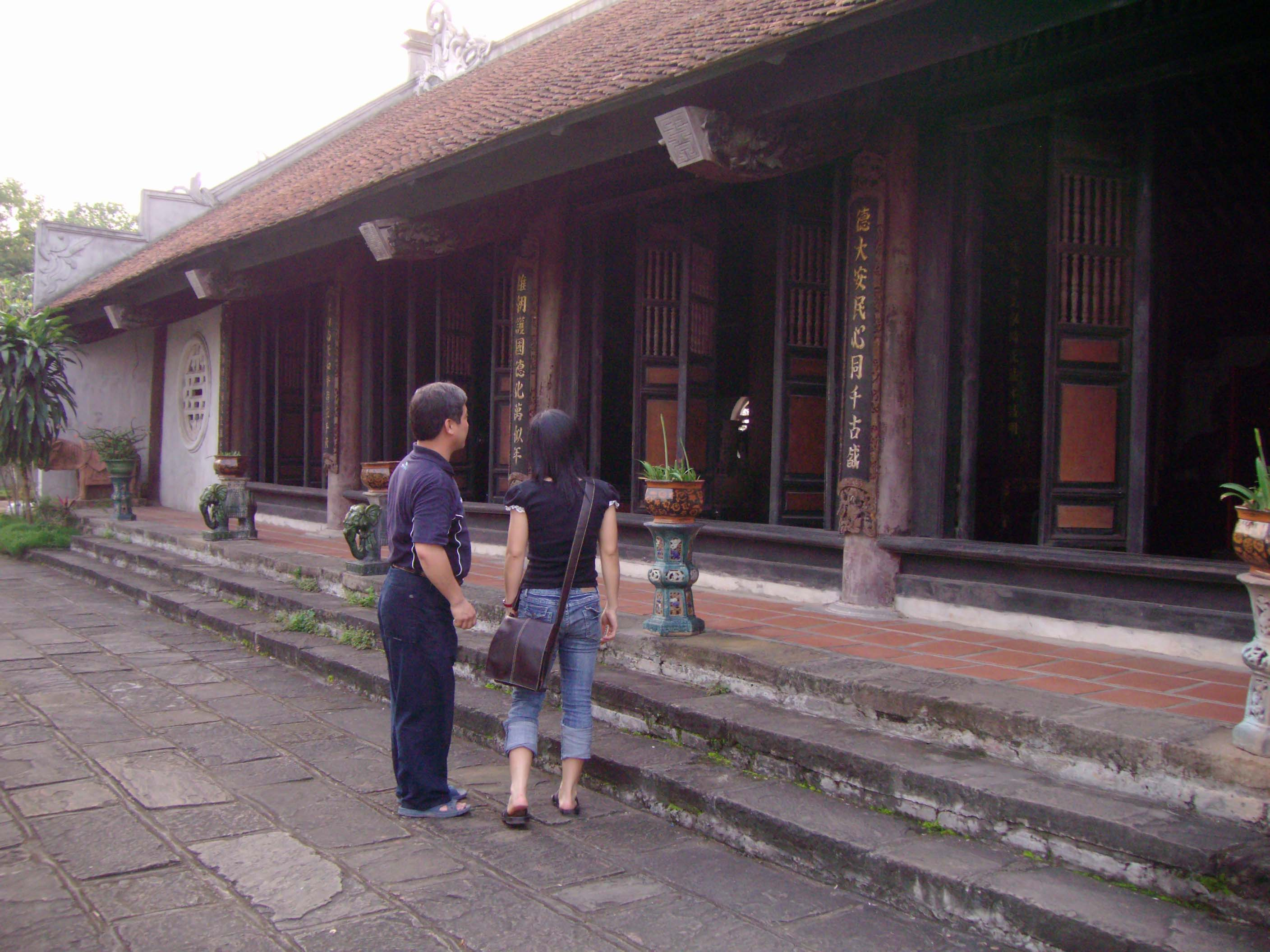
200 year old house

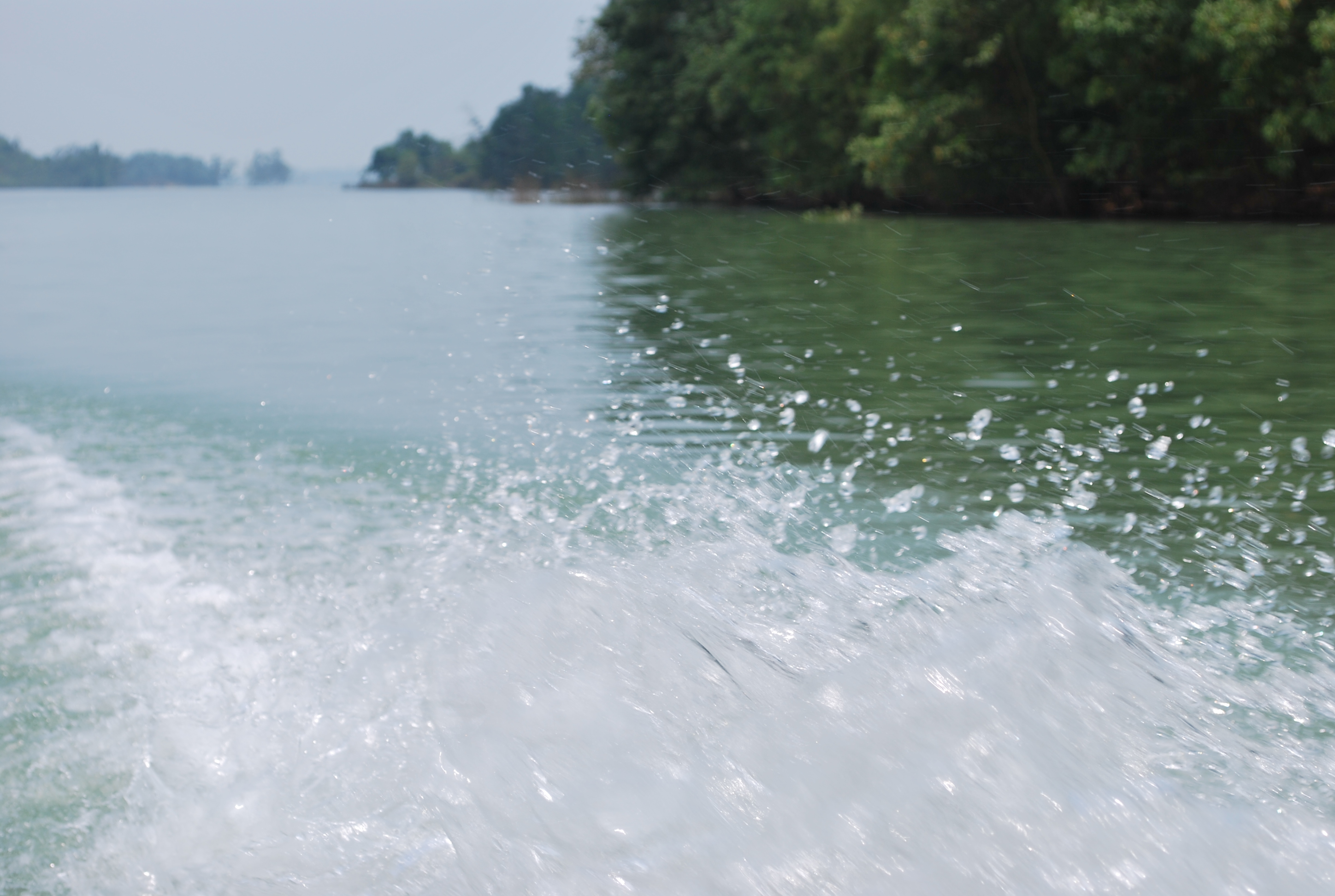
Travel by Canoe on Núi Cốc Lake

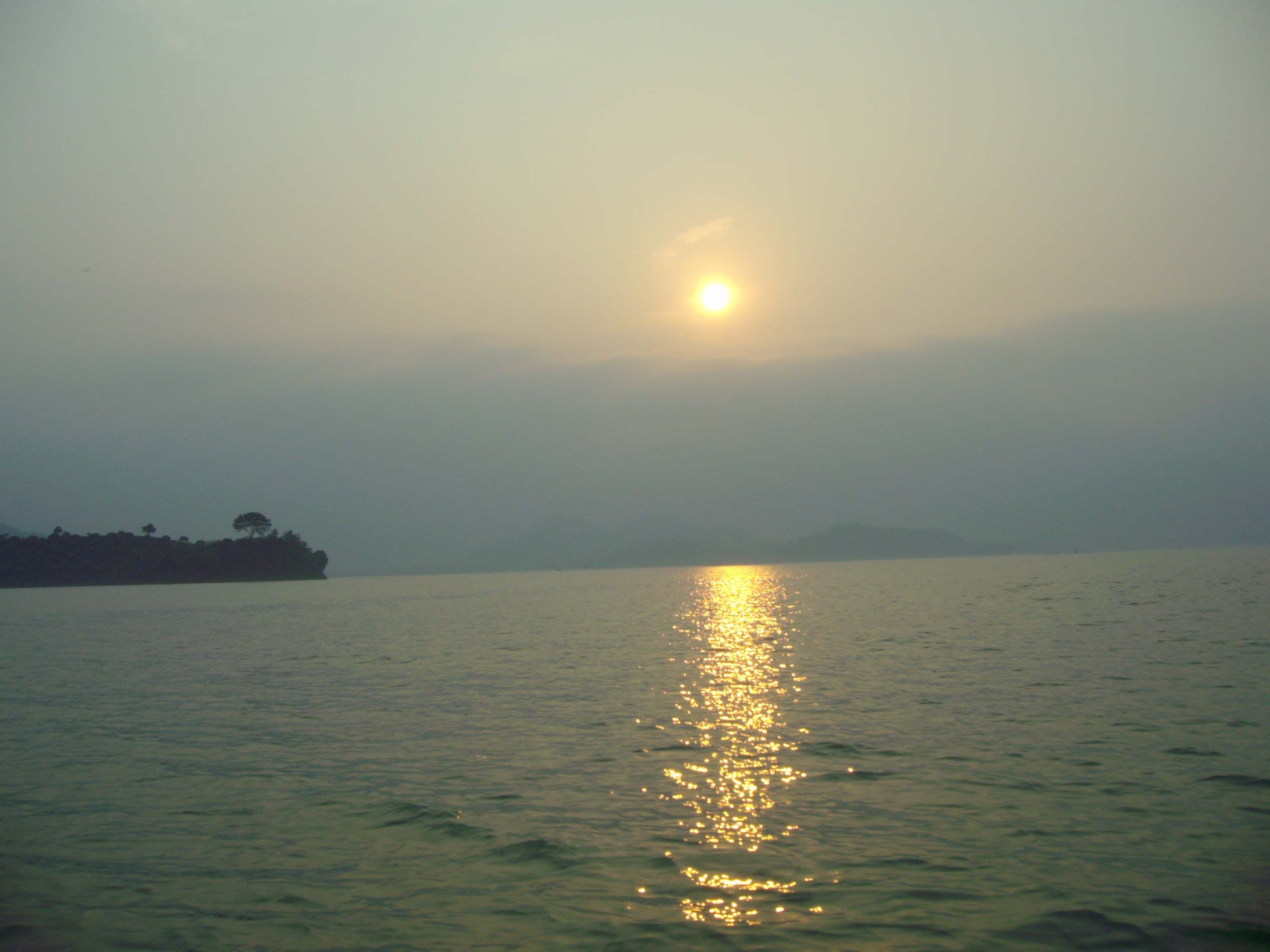
Sunset on Núi Cốc Lake

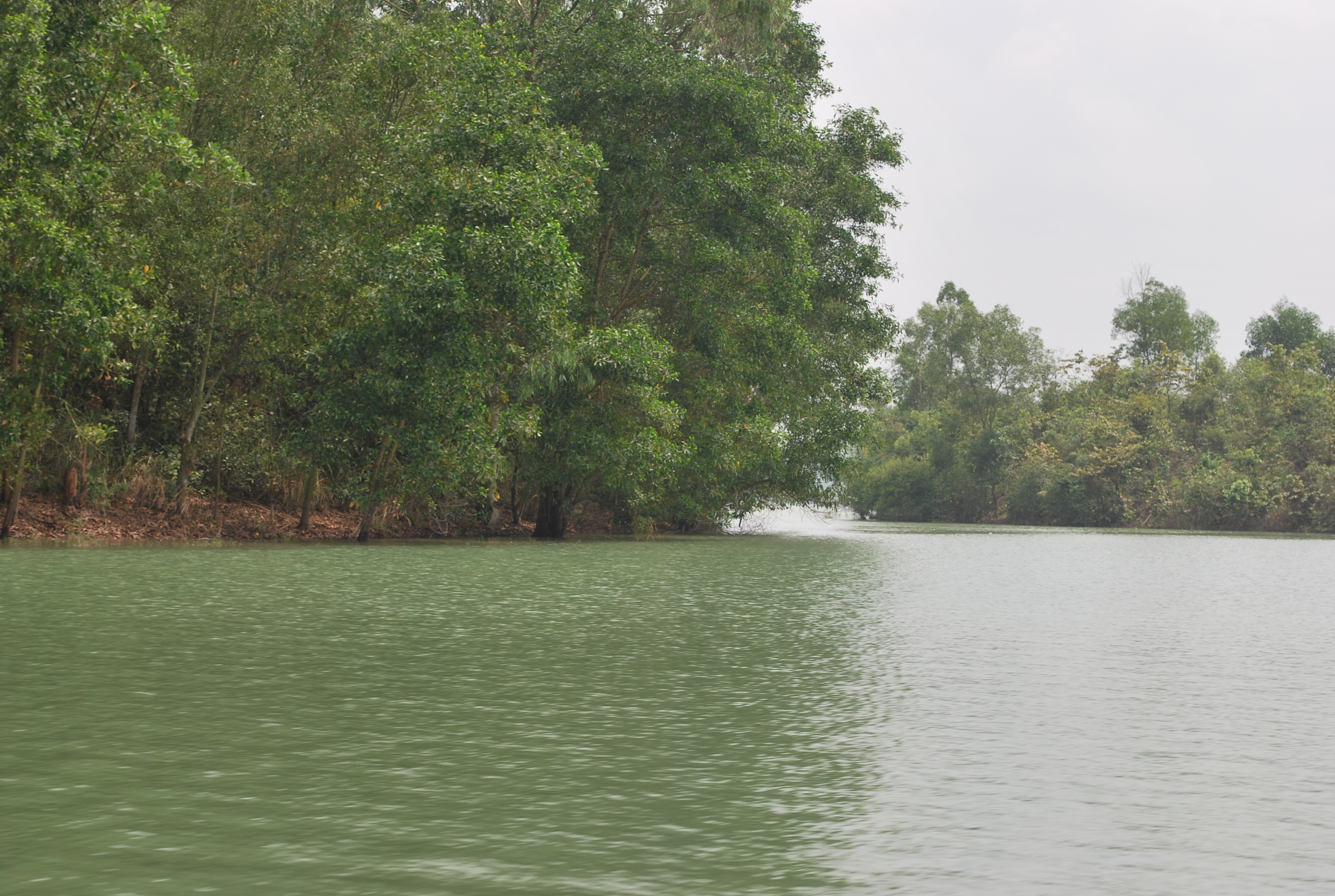
Water surface between two islands

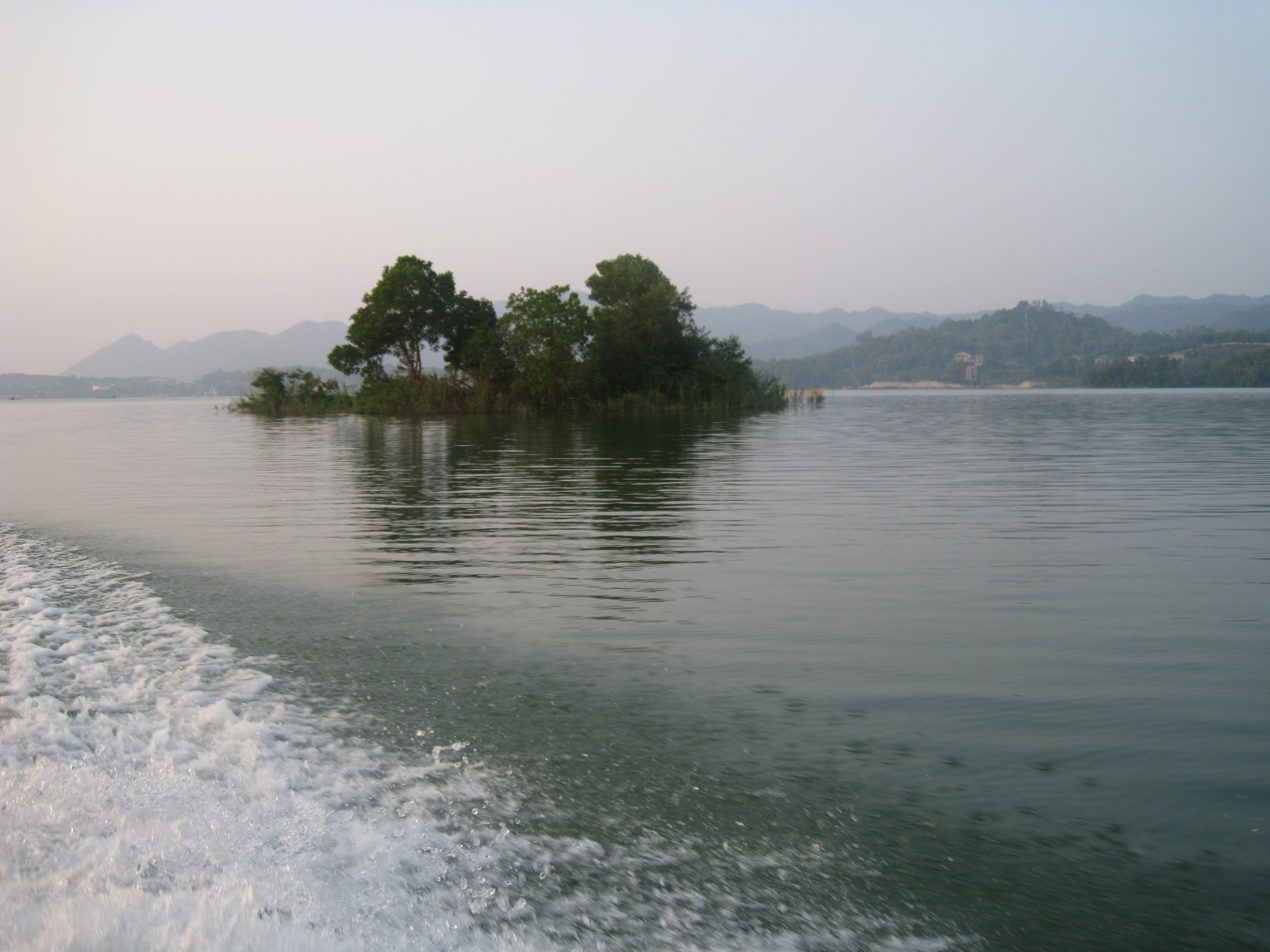
Small island in the middle of the lake

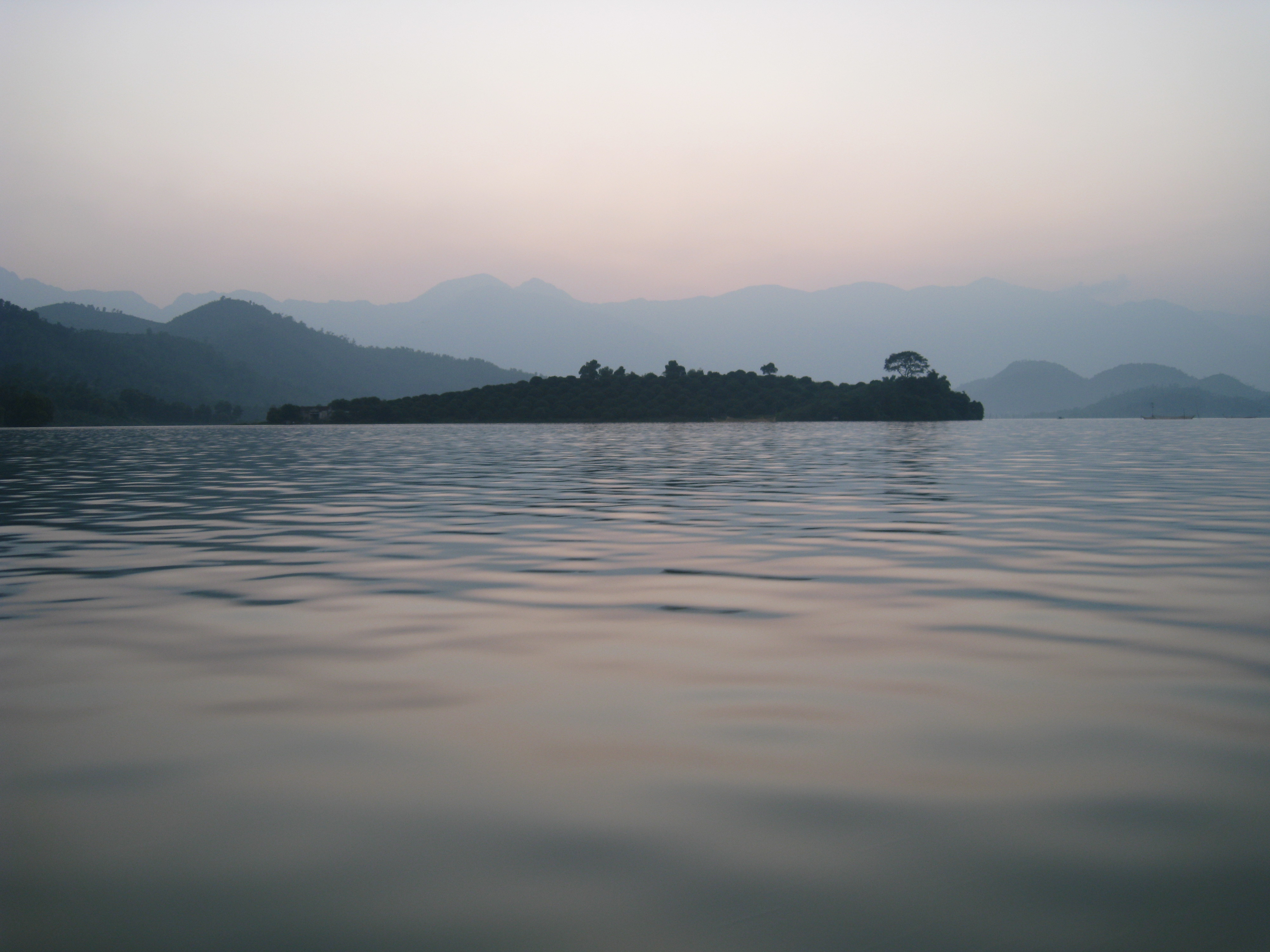
Lake and mountain views
