= Thái Nguyên province =

Province of Vietnam

Thái Nguyên
- Province
- Tỉnh Thái Nguyên 省太原
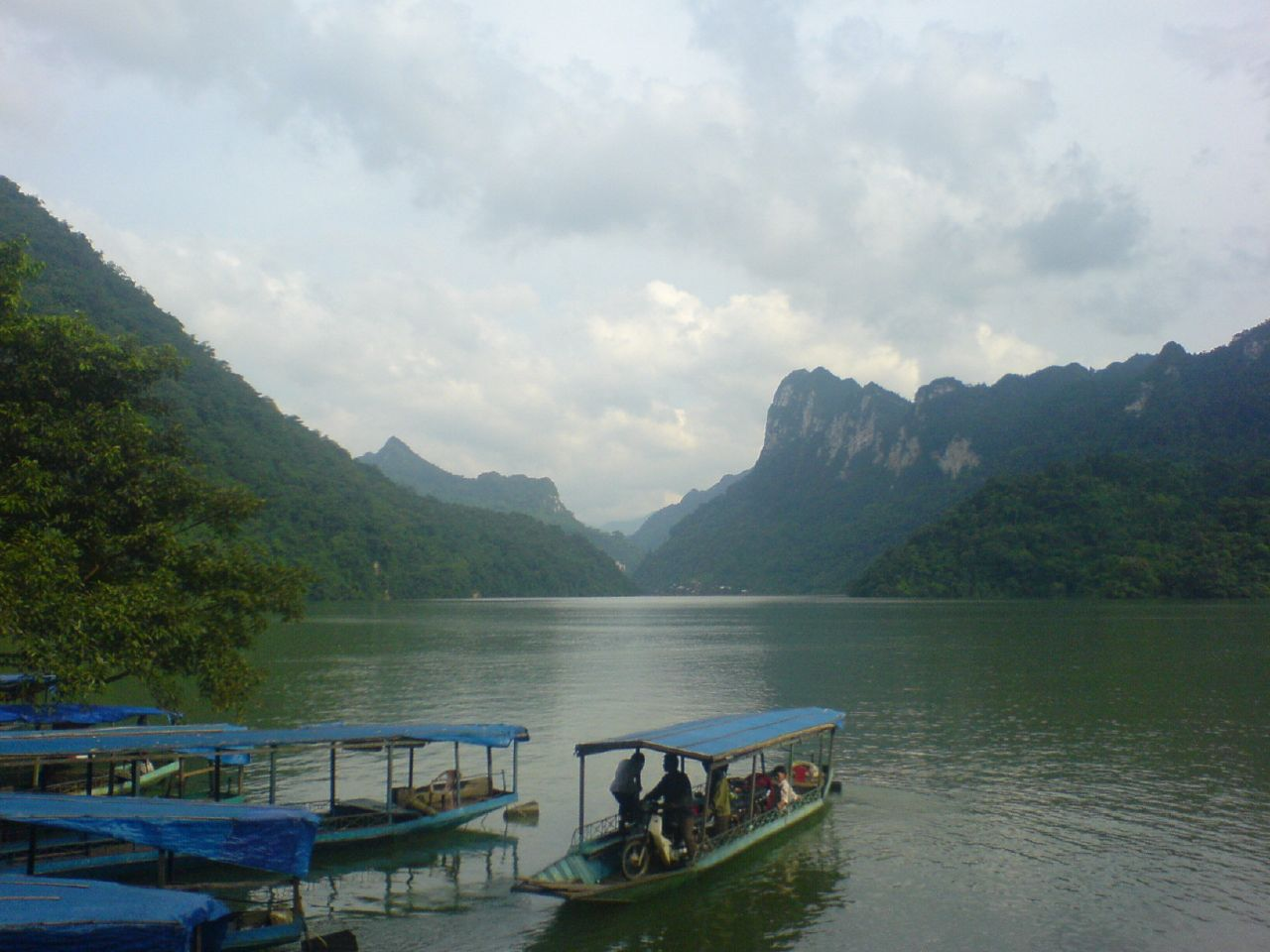
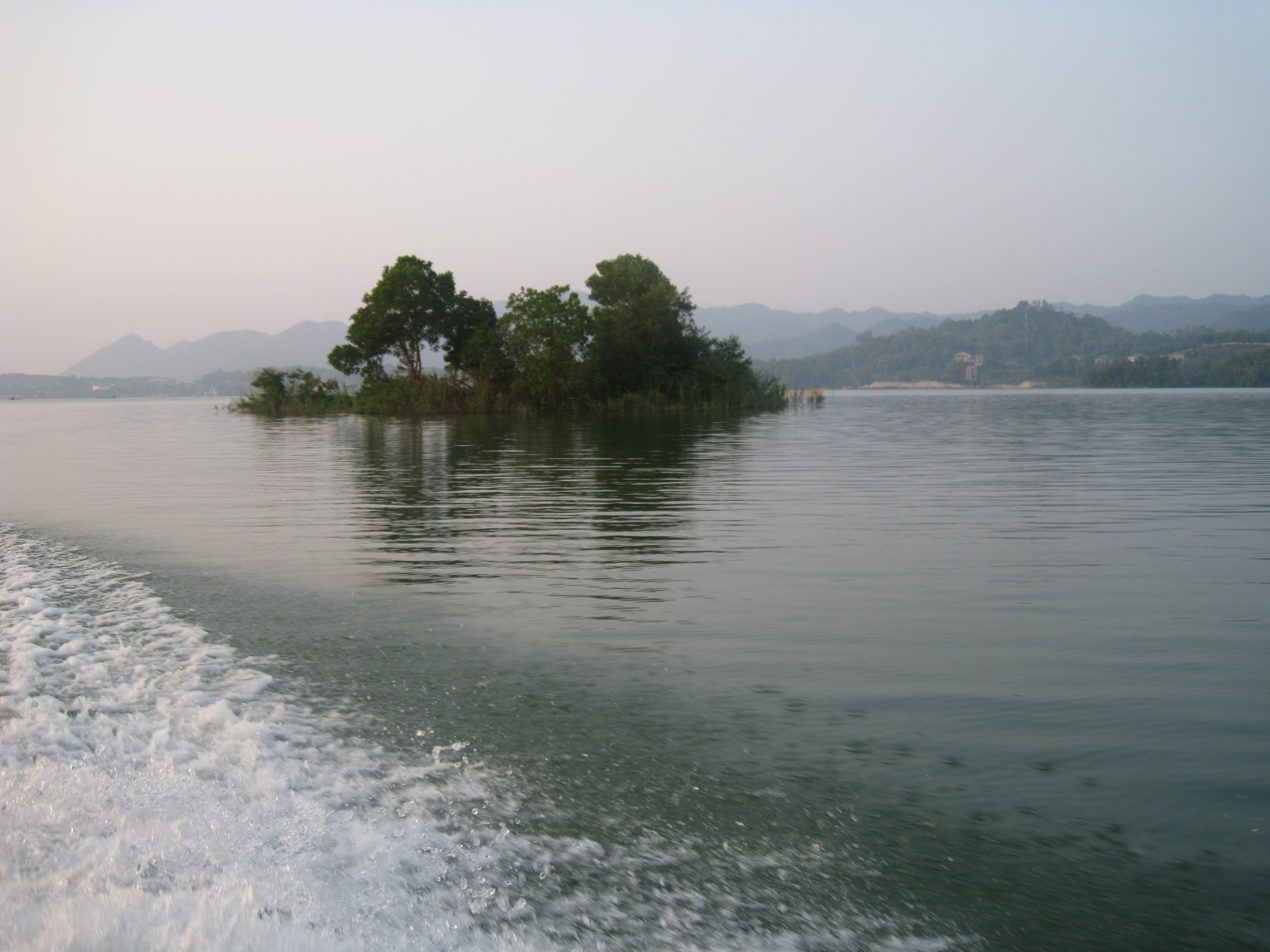
- Left to right: Ba Bể Lake; Núi Cốc Reservoir

- Seal
- Nickname: Great Highland
- Location of Thái Nguyên within Vietnam
- Interactive map of Thái Nguyên
- Coordinates: 21°40′N 105°50′E
- Country: Vietnam
- Region: Northeast
- Capital: Phan Đình Phùng
- Subdivision: 3 cities, 6 rural districts

Government
  - Type: Province
  - Body: Thái Nguyên Provincial People's Council
  - Chairman of People's Council: Phạm Hoàng Sơn
  - Chairman of People's Committee: Trịnh Việt Hùng

Area
  - Province: 8,375.21 km^{2} (3,233.69 sq mi)

Population (2025)
  - Province: 1,799,489
  - Density: 214.859/km^{2} (556.482/sq mi)
  - Urban: 700,000

Ethnic groups
  - Vietnamese: 70.13%
  - Tày: 11.69%
  - Nùng: 6.35%
  - Sán Dìu: 4.39%
  - Sán Chay: 3.07%
  - Others: 4.37%

GDP
  - Province: VND 98.547 trillion US$ 4.280 billion
- Time zone: UTC+7 (ICT)
- Area codes: 208
- ISO 3166 code: VN-69
- HDI (2020): ▲0.770 (9th)
- Website: www.thainguyen.gov.vn

Thái Nguyên (Vietnamese pronunciation: [t̺ʰǎj ŋʷiə̄n]) is a province in the Northeast region of Vietnam. It is a mountainous inland province. Thái Nguyên's society is composed of eight ethnic groups.

With its natural resources and somewhat salubrious climate, Thái Nguyên offers opportunities for industrial development for domestic and foreign investors. It is also known as an educational centre and has 21 universities and colleges. Thái Nguyên is the centre of tea industry in Vietnam with an area of 16,000 ha. (second to Lâm Đồng) with a production of 100,000 tonnes (98,000 long tons; 110,000 short tons) per year. Its dried tea production is 25,000 tonnes (25,000 long tons; 28,000 short tons) per year.

== Geography ==
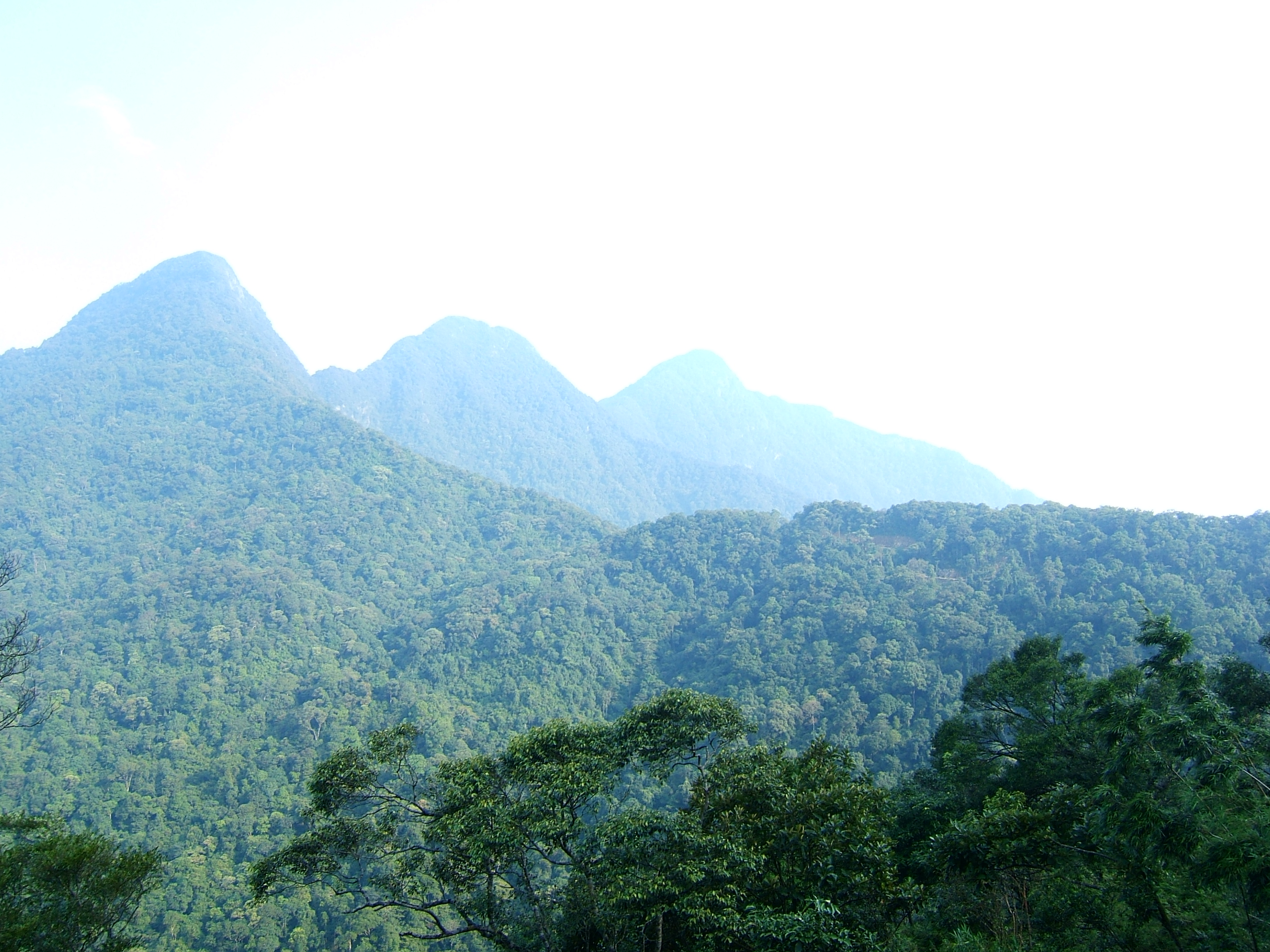
Tam Đảo mountain range

Thái Nguyên borders four provinces: Cao Bằng, Phú Thọ, Tuyên Quang, Lạng Sơn, and two centrally-governed cities: Bắc Ninh and Hanoi. Thái Nguyên is the gateway for socio-economic exchange with the Red River delta. It is 50 km from Noi Bai international airport, 200 km from the Chinese border, 75 km from the center of Hanoi and 200 km from Hai Phong. The exchange is carried out via road, rail and waterways in the province. Main water features include the Công River and Núi Cốc Lake.

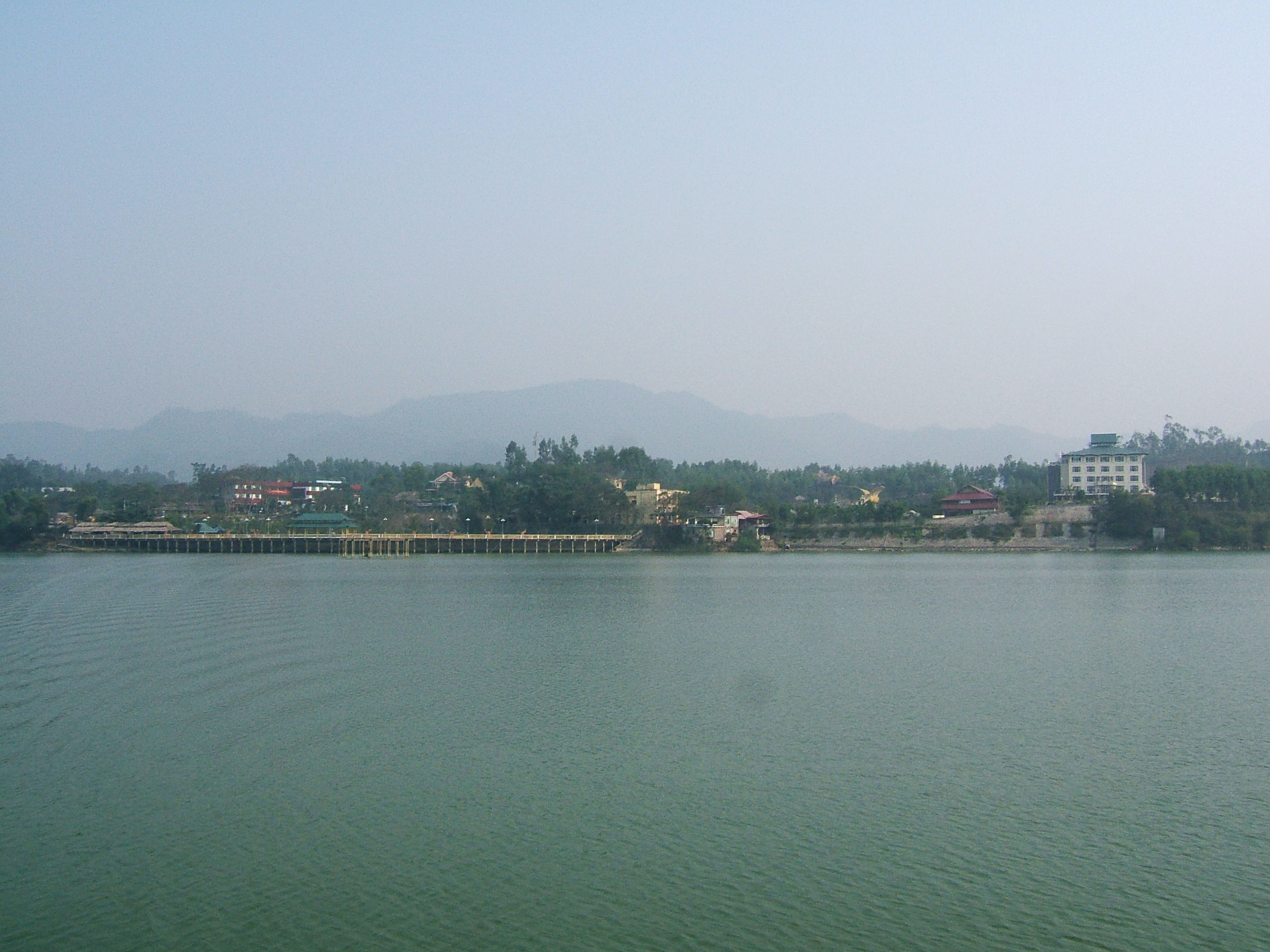
Núi Cốc Lake

Thái Nguyên has mountain ranges running from south to north. Their structure is made of decayed rocks with caves and valleys. In the southwest is the Tam Đảo mountain range, located on the northern fringe of the Red River Delta. The range spans some 80 kilometres, with its highest peak of 1,529 metres (note other sources state 1,590 or 1,592 metres) and cliffs running from northwest to southeast.

The Tam Đảo mountain region is protected by the Tam Đảo National Park, established in 1996, which is one of the national parks in Vietnam.

== Demographics ==
According to the General Statistics Office of the Government of Vietnam, the population of Thái Nguyên province as of 2019 was 1,286,751 with a density of 364 people per km^{2} over a total land area of 3,526.64 km^{2} (1,361.64 mi^{2}). The female population during this period was 657,554 while the male population was 629,197. The rural population was 876,484 against an urban population of 410,267 (about 47% of the rural population).

== Economy and development ==
Farming, aquaculture and industries are some of the economic activities of the province. In 2008, as against the national figure of 7,592 cooperatives of Agriculture, Forestry and Fishery cooperatives, there are 83 agriculture cooperatives in the province. There were 638 farms as against the national number of 120,699 in 2008. The output value of agriculture produce at constant 1994 prices in the province was 1667.1 billion đồngs against the national value of 156681.9 billion đồngs. The province produced 410,400 tonnes of cereals as against the national production of 43.68 million tonnes. The per capita production of cereals in the province was 356.9 kg as against the national figure of 501.9 kg in 2007. In 2007, the industrial output of the province was 11,987.5 Bhilldongs against the national output of 1.47 million Bhilldongs.

=== Irrigation and hydroelectric power ===
Núi Cốc reservoir is 25 km west of Thái Nguyên city. It covers an area of 2,500 hectares (6,200 acres) with 23 metres (75 ft) deep waters that can store 175 million cubic metres. The lake waters feeds an irrigation canal and a hydroelectric power station with three units of 630 KW capacity each, for a total output of about 2 GW. The irrigation system was built in 1977. The power plant construction on the irrigation canal was started in Jan 2008 and the plant commissioned in Jan 2010. A 22 kV transmission line carries the power to a nearby grid.

=== Transport ===
Two railway lines serve Thái Nguyên Province, and particularly the city of Thái Nguyên. The first line connects Hanoi Railway Station to Quán Triều Railway Station (Quán Triều Ward), and the second connects Lưu Xá Railway Station (Phú Xá Ward) to Hạ Long Railway Station, Hạ Long, via a railway junction at Kép in Bắc Giang province. Both lines were built after the First Indochina War; unlike most railway lines in Vietnam, which were established in metre gauge, the 163 km (101 mi) Luu Xa–Hạ Long line was built at standard gauge, and the 75 km (47 mi) Hanoi–Quán Triều line was built at mixed gauge. The rail spur connecting Luu Xa and Kép was a strategic line constructed between October 1965 and December 1966 by a railroad engineering division of the Chinese People's Liberation Army, who operated in North Vietnam repairing railway lines at the request of Ho Chi Minh.

== Administrative divisions ==
Thái Nguyên map before 2025

Thái Nguyên is subdivided into 92 commune, wards.

Before 2025, there are 9 district-level sub-divisions and 178 commune-level sub-divisions:

Administrative divisions of Thái Nguyên

Name	Population	Commune-level sub-divisions
Cities (3)
Thái Nguyên	362,921	21 wards, 11 communes
Phổ Yên	220,963	13 wards, 5 communes
Sông Công	146,120	7 wards, 3 communes
District (6)
Đại Từ District	160,598	2 towns, 28 communes

Name	Population	Commune-level sub-divisions
Định Hóa District	90,600	1 town, 22 communes
Đồng Hỷ District	90,709	2 towns, 13 communes
Phú Bình District	144,908	1 town, 19 communes
Phú Lương District	94,203	2 towns, 13 communes
Võ Nhai District	68,080	1 town, 14 communes

== Attractions ==
Some tourist attractions outside the capital city are listed below.

Núi Cốc Lake

Tour boats circle the lake, recounting local legends and visiting some of the 89 islands within it. Some islands feature historic remains, protected breeding sites for birds, or feral goats. In March 2007, an eco-tourism park was developed beside the lake. It features musical fountains, an animal park, and a Fairy Tale House Underworld and Water park.

Phuong Hoang cave

Phuong Hoang (Phoenix) cave is located at a distance of 40 km from Thái Nguyên city. The cave has four chambers where stalagmite and stalactite formations can be seen. Two of the caves admit some sunlight when the sun is at the right angle. Otherwise, artificial light is required to see the Hisinterior.

Historical Safe Zone

Historical Safe Zone (An toàn khu – ATK) locates in Định Hóa district. This was the place where President Ho Chi Minh had lived for some years during the Resistance War against France (1945–1954).

Cuisine

Besides its tea, the province is known for such local culinary specialties as bún chả and phở noodle dishes, Định Hóa rice, Dầy cake, Cooc mo cake, Úc Kỳ sticky rice sauce, Smoked Meat, Phở Chua. Another food is Bánh chưng from Bờ Đậu village about 10 km north of Thái Nguyên City in Phú Lương District, where both sides of the road are lined with shops selling the local specialty made from glutinous rice cake, mung bean puree, and pork wrapped in aromatic leaves (usually Stachyphrynium placentarium, sometimes banana) and tied up with string made from a kind of bamboo, which can be used to slice the rice cake into portions for sharing. Tết is the village's busiest season.

== Gallery ==
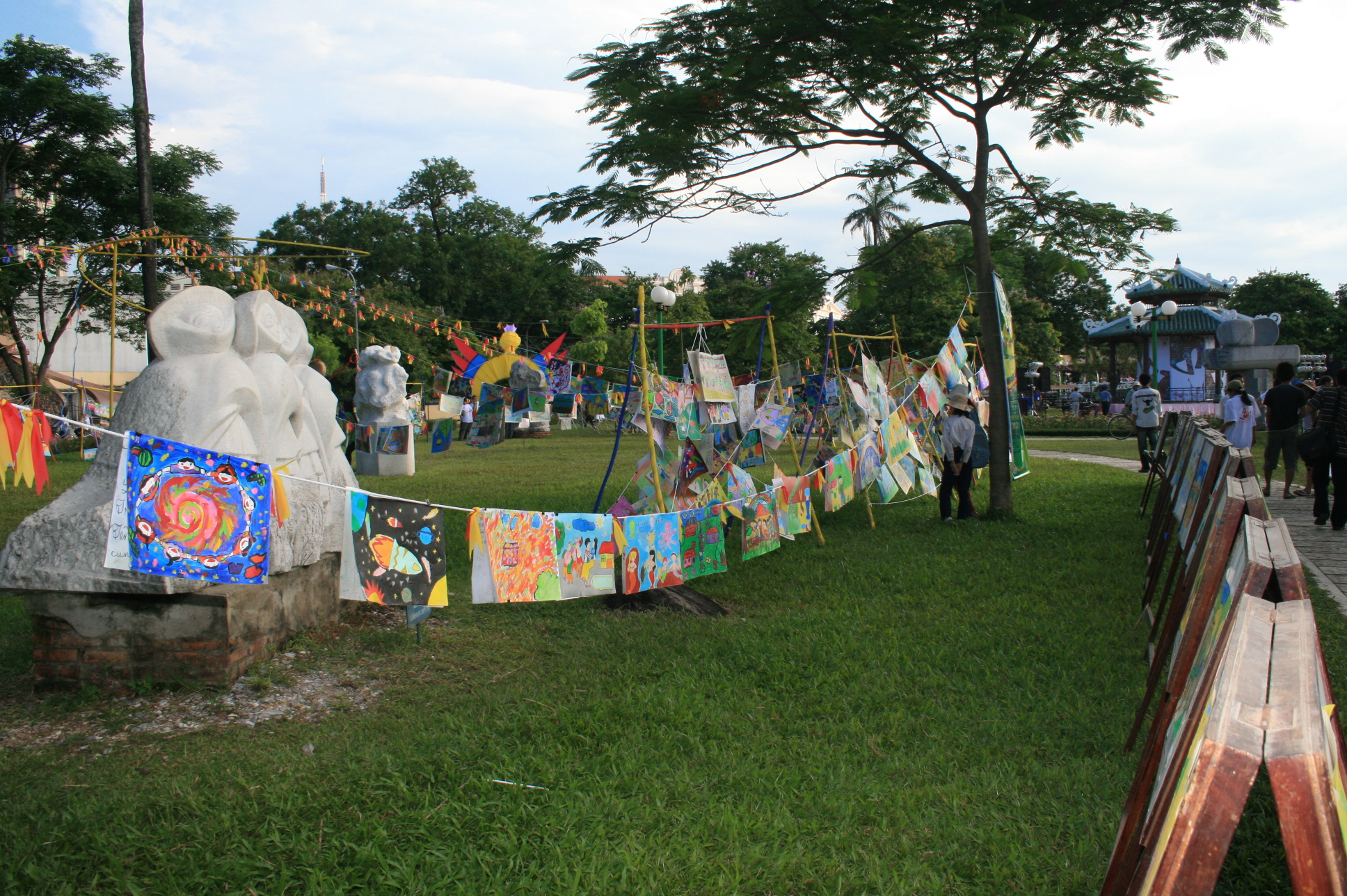
A festival scene

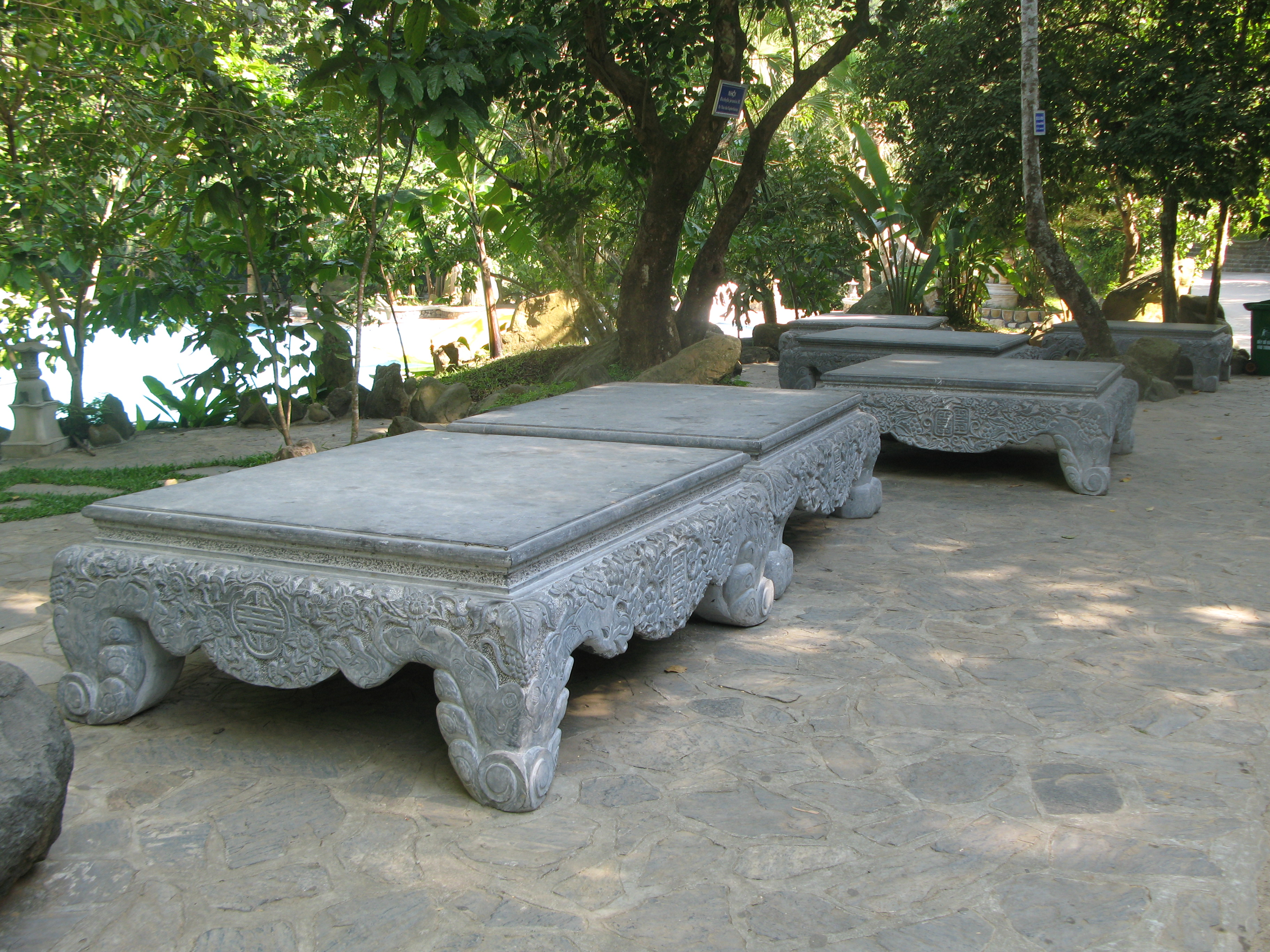
Seats in a garden

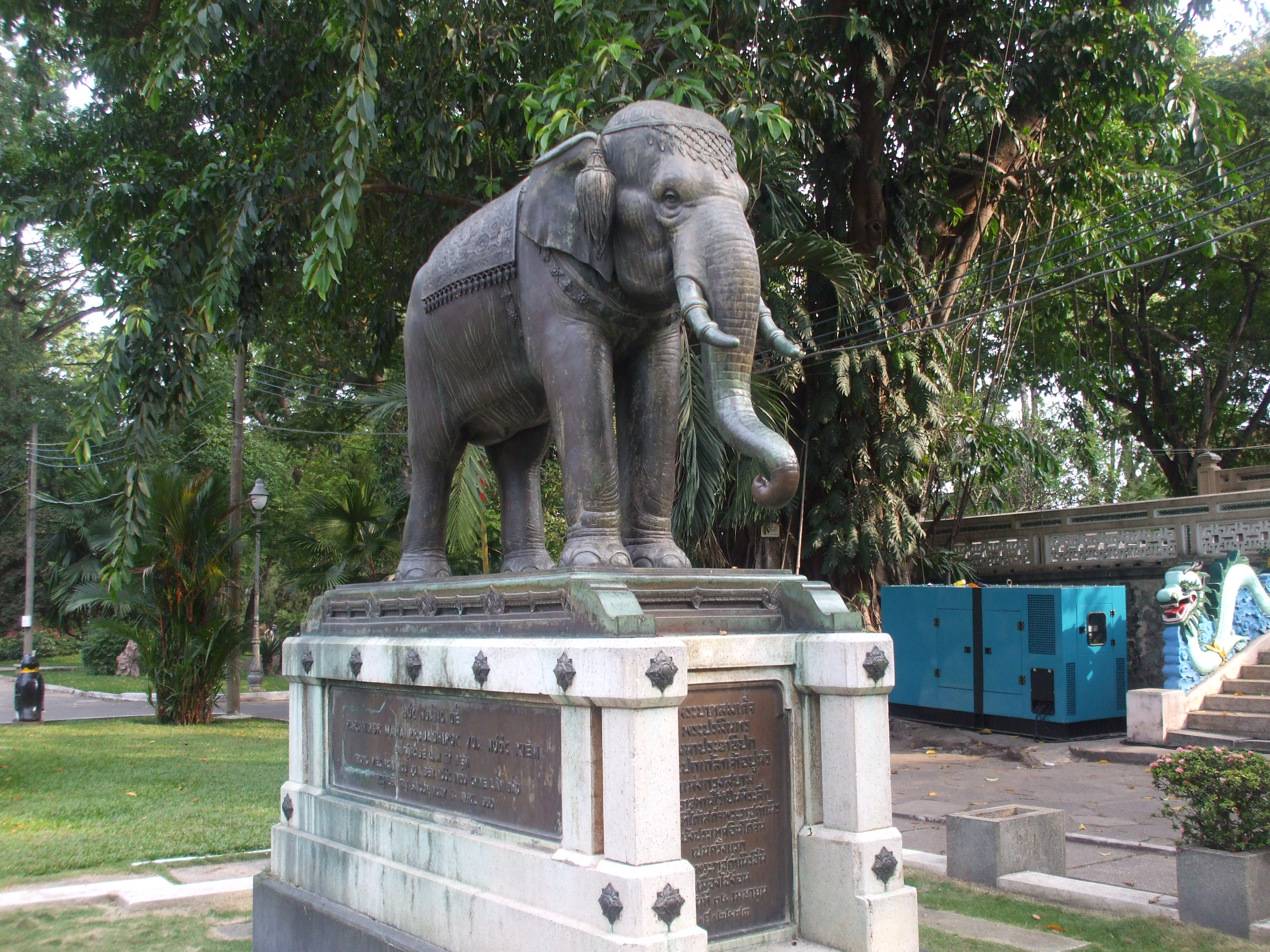
The elephant statue as a present of King Prajadhipok of Siam at entrance to a temple

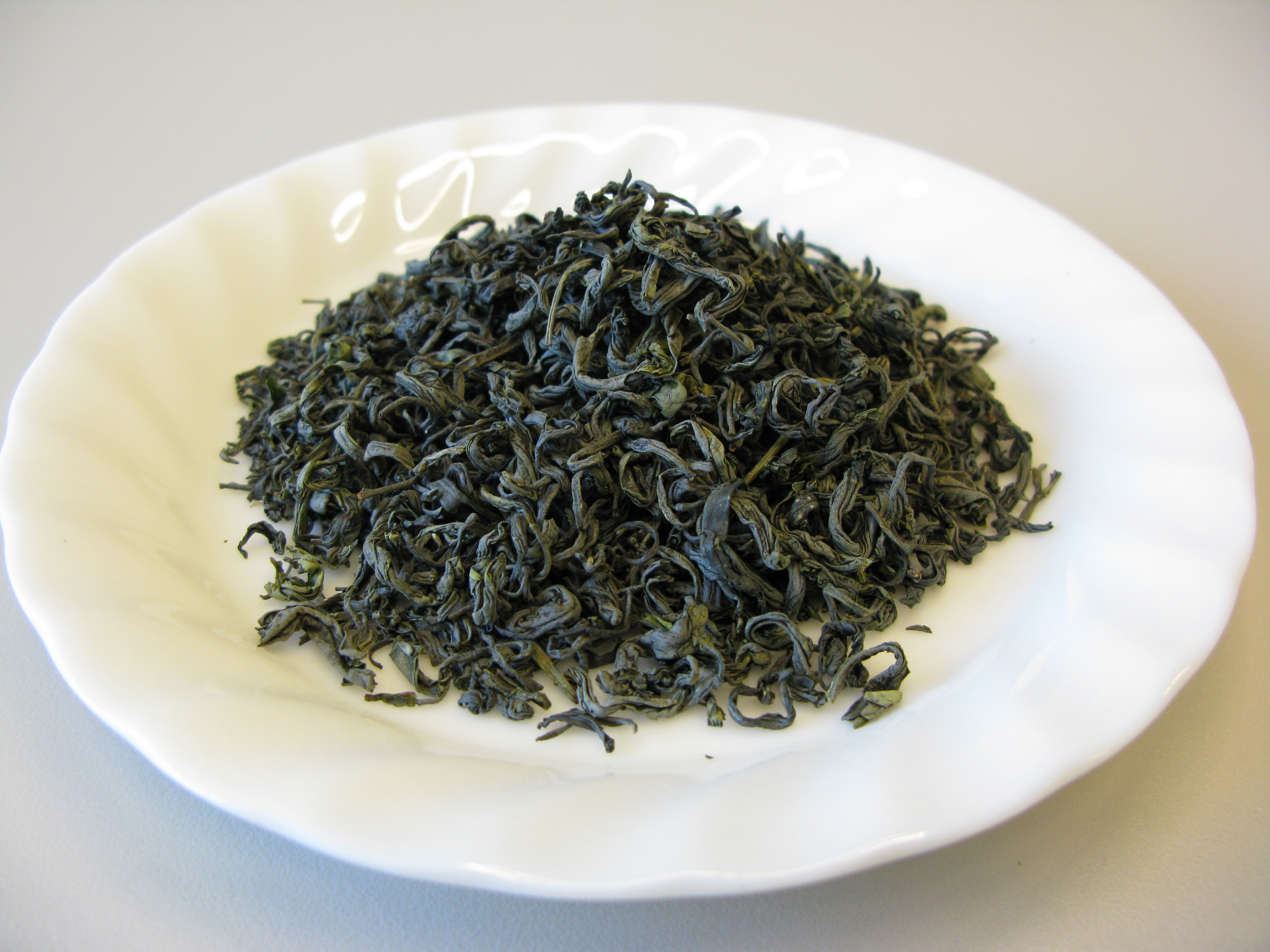
Vietnamese green tea

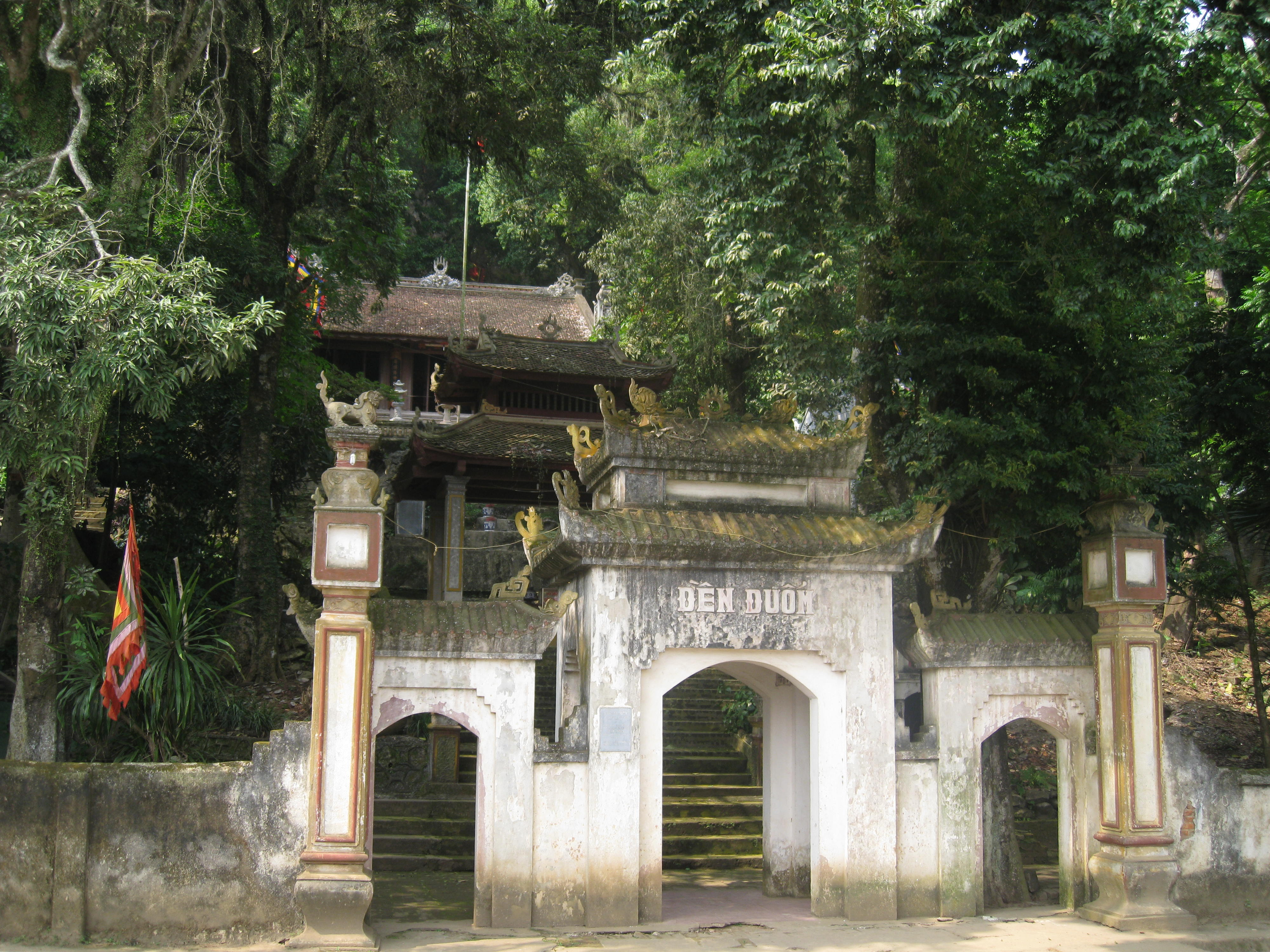
Temple in the province

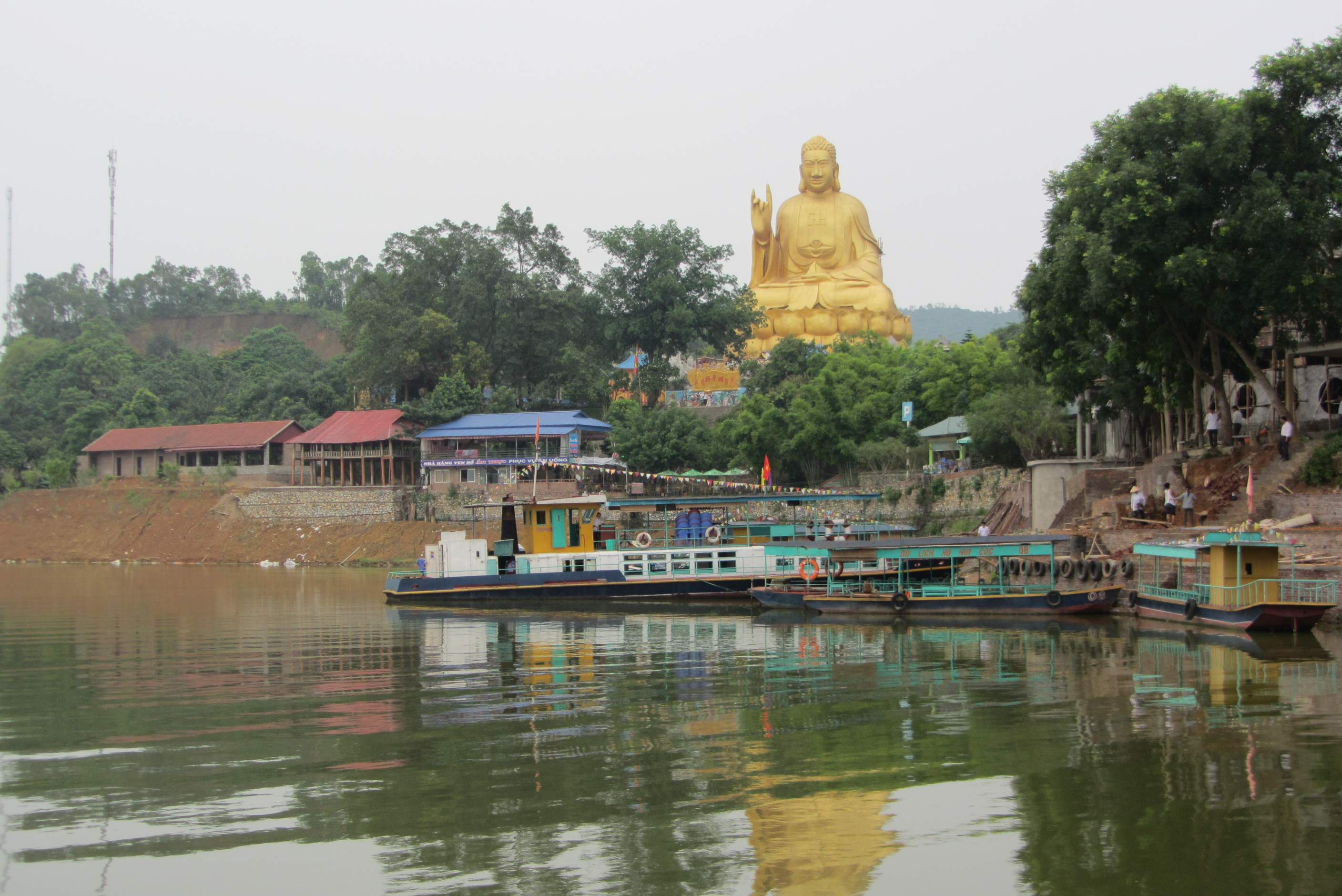
Buddha statue and tour boats at Nui Coc Lake

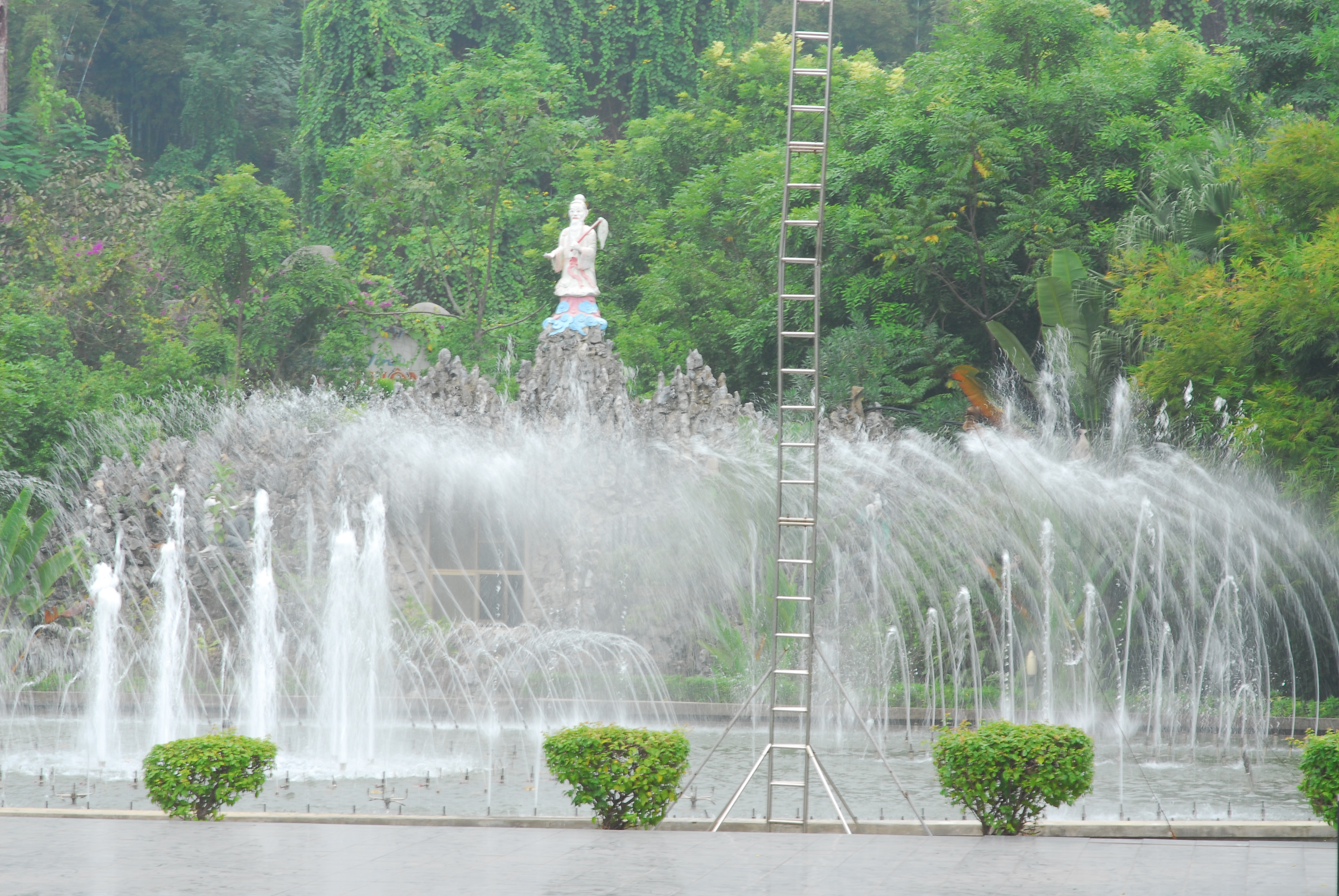
Fountain in Nui Coc Lake Tourist Area

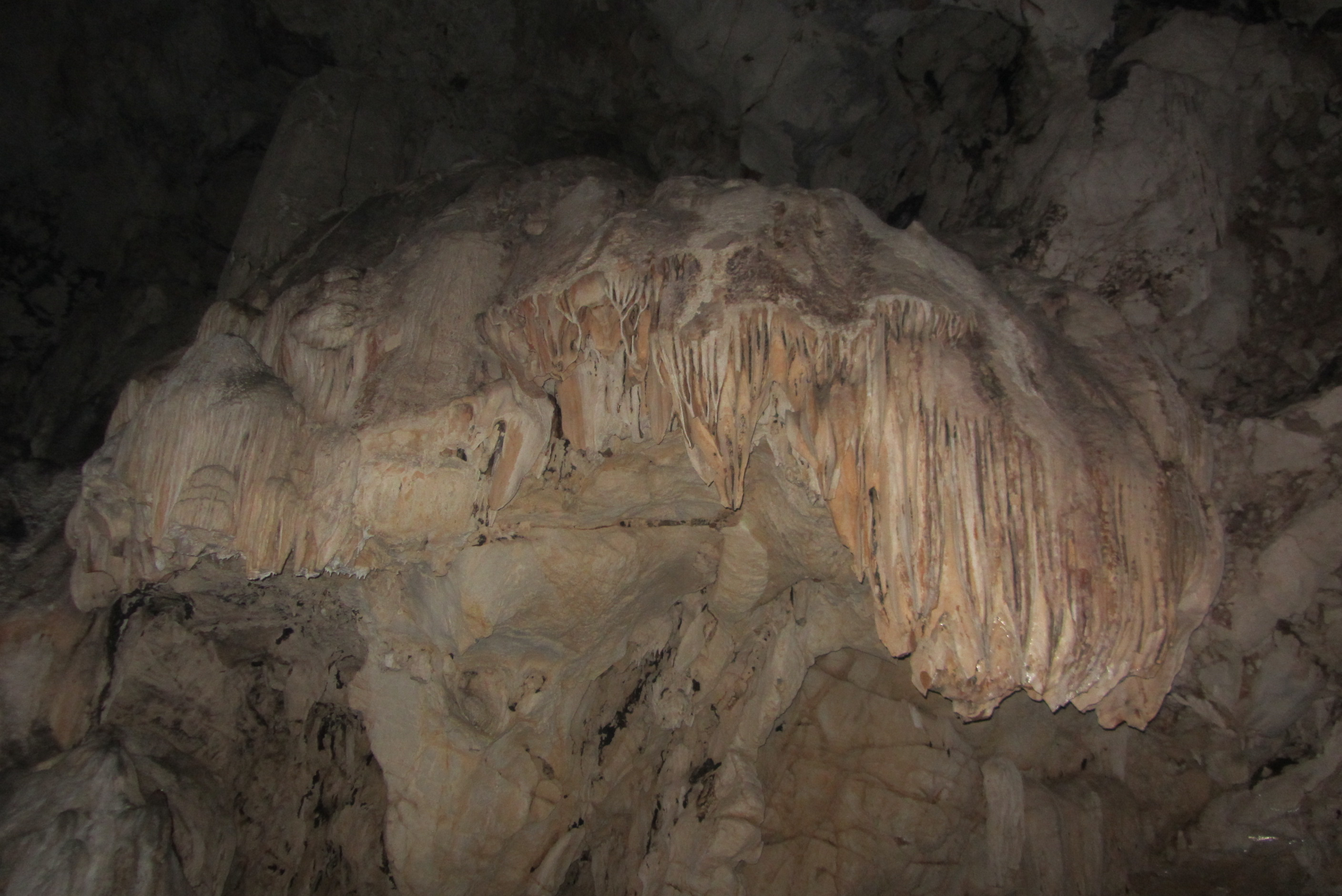
Inside Phoenix Cave
