= D18E =

Vietnam Railways D18E
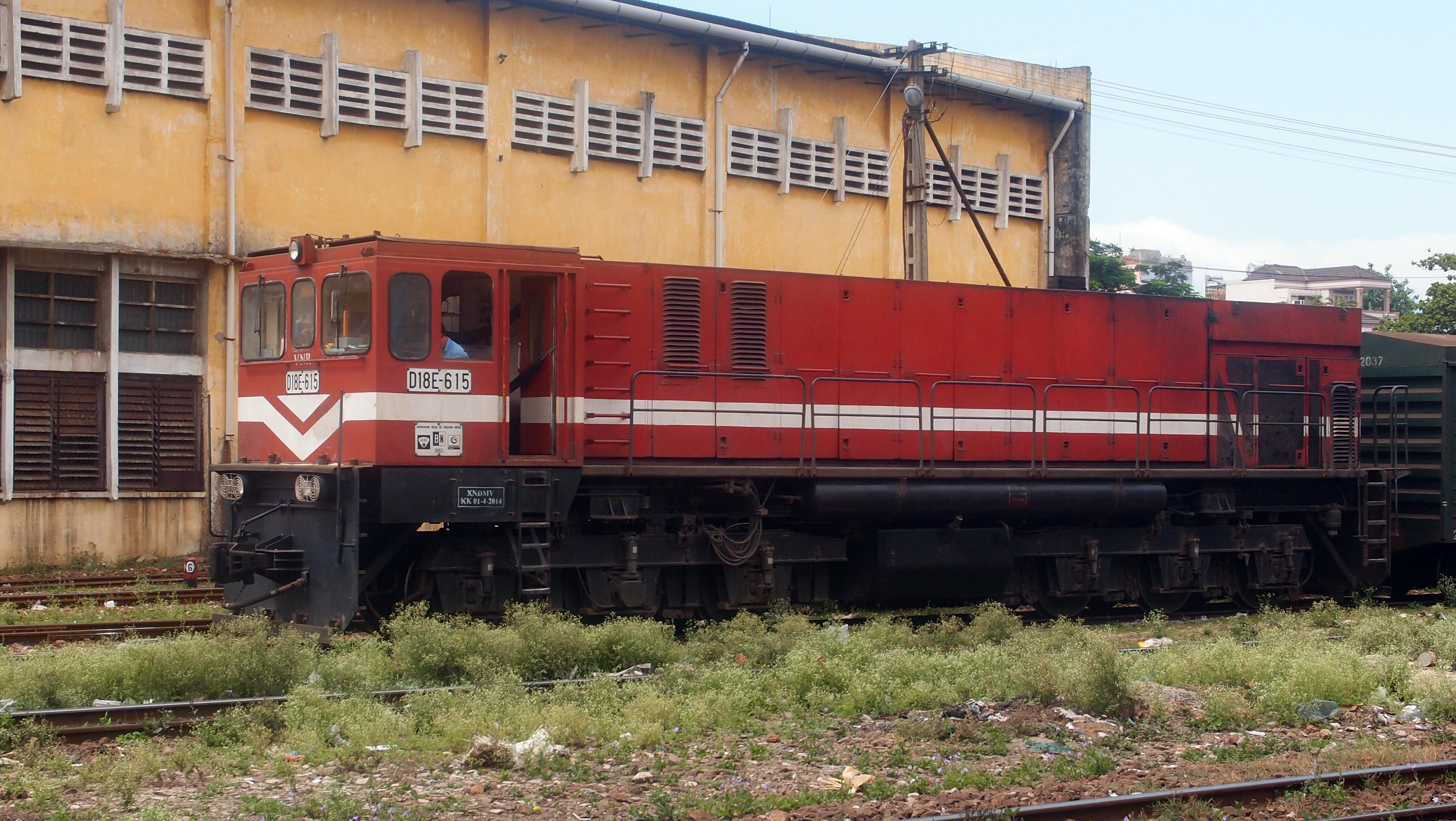
- Unit #615 in Da Nang, May 2014.
Type and origin
- Power type: Diesel
- Builder: Cockerill - ACEC - BN
- Build date: 1983 (per builder’s plate)
- Total produced: 16
Specifications
- Configuration
  - UIC: Co'Co'
- Gauge: 1,000 mm (3 ft 3 3/8 in)
- Length: 15,500 mm (50 ft 10 in)
- Width: 2,800 mm (9 ft 2 in)
- Height: 3,600 mm (11 ft 10 in)
- Axle load: 14 tonnes
- Loco weight: 108 tonnes
- Fuel type: Diesel
- Engine type: 1800 hp 'Cockerill Diesel' engine
- Transmission: electric
Performance figures
- Maximum speed: 105 km/h (65 mph)
Career
- Operators: Vietnam Railways
- Class: D18E
- Locale: Vietnam

The D18E, is a series of Belgian-built diesel locomotives used on the Vietnamese railway network since the 1980s.

== History ==
The locomotives were built in Belgium by Cockerill - ACEC – BN in 1983, entering service in Vietnam in August 1984. The units were numbered 601–618.

The series was bought by a re-unified Vietnam using one of the first state-to-state loans offered to the country after the end of the Vietnam War; Belgium and Vietnam have had a continuous diplomatic history since the locomotives were purchased. Belgium was one of the first countries to establish diplomatic relations with Vietnam after the Paris Peace Agreement was signed in 1973 and was an early economic supporter of the country after the war ended. As part of the process, the Belgian Parliament approved a loan to allow for the purchase of these locomotives.

The D18E locomotives are noted to have a relatively high fuel consumption compared to the more modern D19E and D20E, due to their lack of electronic speed governors. The state railways have studied ways to reduce fuel consumption in these and other older locomotive types.

In 2023, 16 units were still operational, but at the end of the mandated 40-year lifespan. Due to the effects of COVID-19 on the economy, they are not likely to be replaced very soon, due to the high cost of new, more environmentally-friendly locomotives. As of 2023, the railway had experienced a financial loss in each of the past three years. One official notes that despite their age, the "diesel locomotives are all maintained and operated normally by VNR". In July 2023, the government issued a decree allowing locomotives that have reached the end of their 40-year lifespan to operate until December 31, 2030. The D18E units were inspected and said to still meet technical standards, ensuring a safe continued operation of the locomotives.

The Belgian ambassador to Vietnam visited the remaining locomotives during an official visit in 2018, with the Hanoi Times calling the locomotives "ambassadors of Belgium’s support" for the country since 1978.
