= Gia Lâm (disambiguation) =

Gia Lâm may refer to:

- Gia Lâm District, Hanoi, Vietnam
  - Gia Lam Airport
  - Gia Lâm station
- Gia Lam Train Company, a Vietnamese railcar manufacturer
