= D12E =

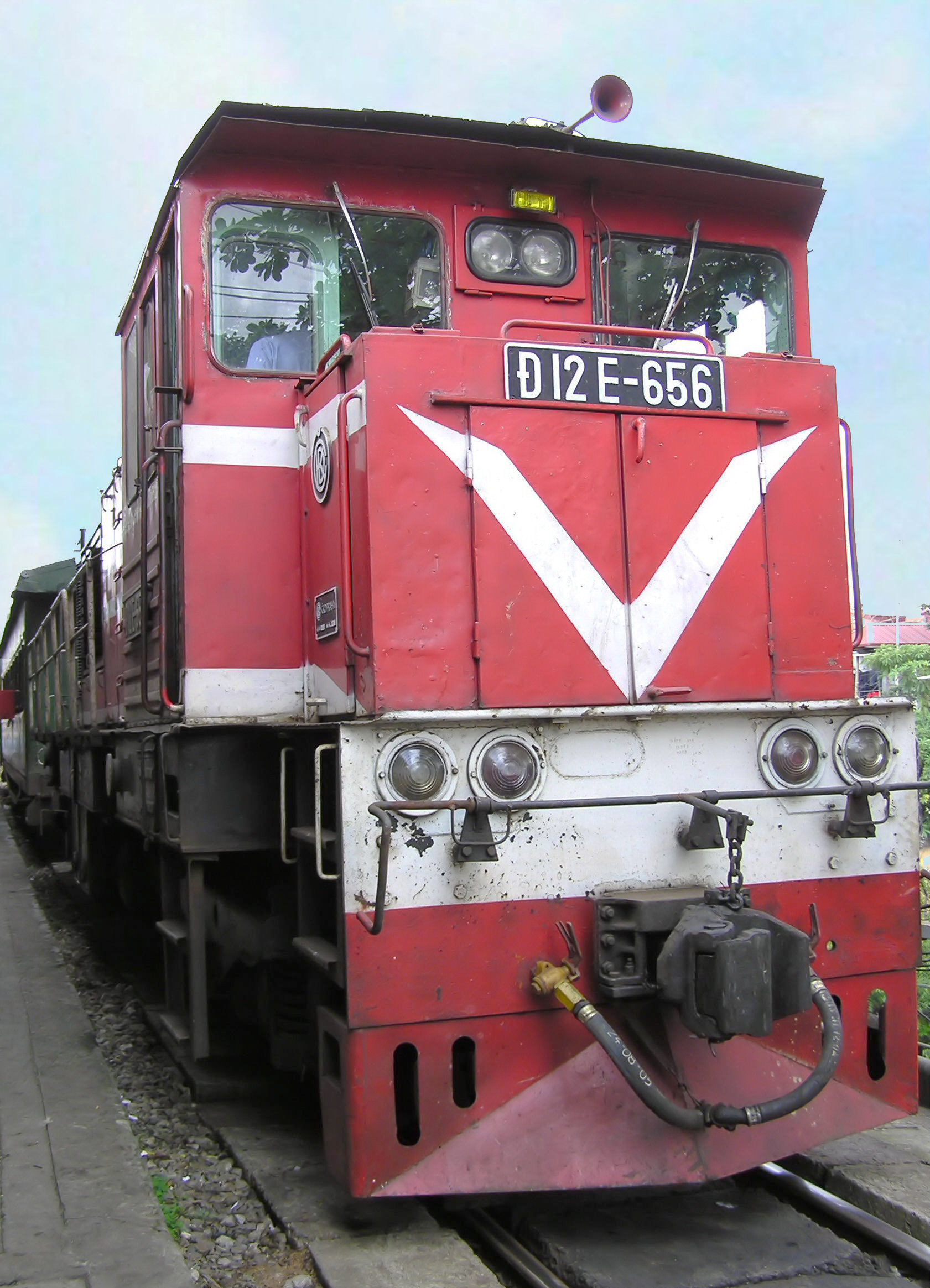
- D12E locomotive in Long Biên station
Type and origin
- Power type: Diesel
- Build date: 1986
- Total produced: 45
Specifications
- Configuration
  - UIC: Bo-Bo
- Gauge: 1,000 mm (3 ft 3 3/8 in)
- Length: 13,306 mm (43 ft 7.9 in)
- Width: 2,754 mm (9 ft 0.4 in)
- Height: 3,854 mm (12 ft 7.7 in)
- Axle load: 14 t
- Loco weight: 56 t
- Fuel type: Diesel
- Transmission: Electric DC-DC
Performance figures
- Maximum speed: 80 km/h (50 mph)
- Power output: 736 KW
Career
- Operators: Vietnam Railways
- Class: D12E
- Locale: Vietnam

The D12E is a diesel locomotive and currently used on Vietnam Railways network.

== History ==
These were built at Czechoslovakia, then, they give 25 locomotives to Da Nang Locomotive Enterprise and 15 for Hanoi Locomotive Enterprise in 1986. But since 1996, Da Nang Locomotive Enterprise has given 12 D12E locomotives to Hanoi Locomotive Enterprise and Ha Lao Locomotive Enterprise.

== Information ==
- Power type: Diesel
- Built: 1986 (Czechoslovakia)
- UIC: Bo-Bo
- Gauge: 1,000 mm (3 ft 3 3/8 in)
- Length: 13,306 mm (43 ft 7.9 in)
- Width: 2,754 mm (9 ft 0.4 in)
- Height: 3,854 mm (12 ft 7.7 in)
- Loco weight: 56 t
- Transmission: Electric DC - DC
- Maximum speed: 80 km/h (50 mph)
- Power output: 736 KW
