= Vietnam Railways =

State-owned railway company of Vietnam

Vietnam National Railways
- Native name: Tổng Công Ty Đường Sắt Việt Nam
- Type: State-owned enterprise
- Industry: Rail transport
- Headquarters: Hanoi, Vietnam
- Website: dsvn.vn

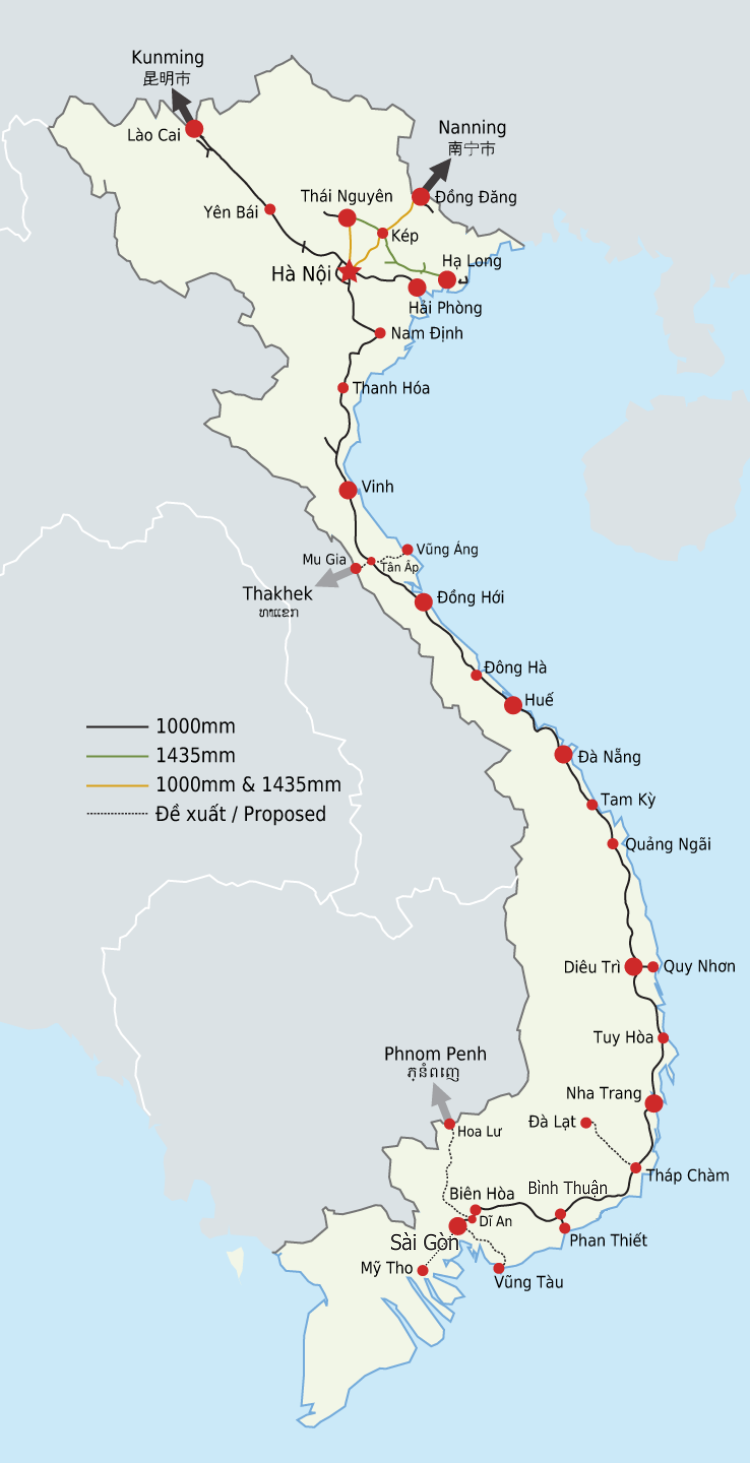
Vietnam Railways system

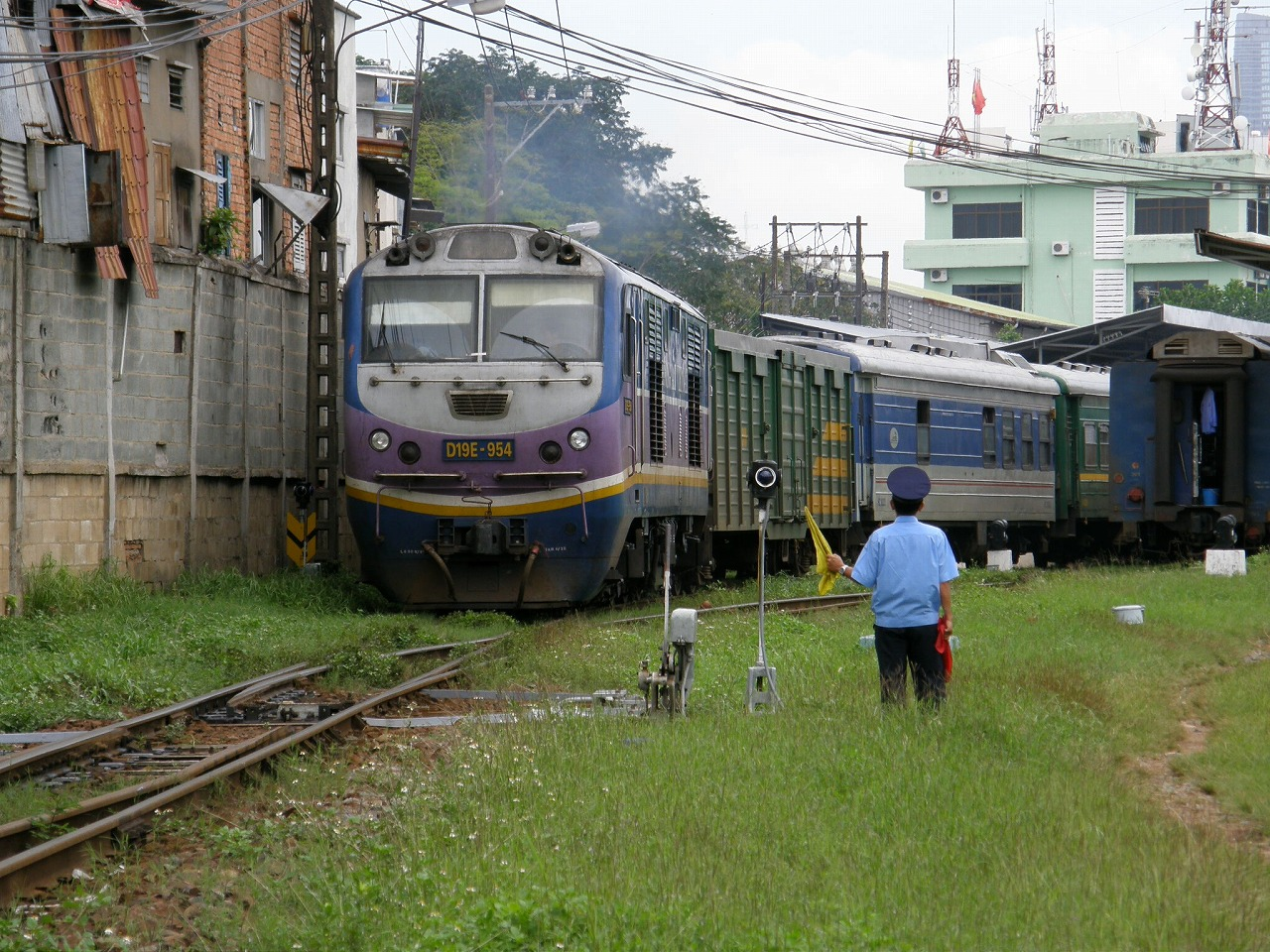
A D19E-954 locomotive hauling passenger coaches and freight leaving Sài Gòn Station

Vietnam National Railways (VNR; Vietnamese: Tổng công ty Đường sắt Việt Nam, lit. 'Vietnam Railways Corporation') is the state-owned operator of the railway system in Vietnam. The principal route is the 1,727 km (1,100 mi) single-track North–South Railway line, running between Hanoi and Ho Chi Minh City. This was built at the metre gauge in the 1880s during the French colonial rule. There are also standard gauge lines running from Hanoi to the People’s Republic of China, eventually leading to Beijing, and some mixed gauge in and around Hanoi.

== Problems ==
While the state of the country’s road network is consistently improving, the railway system makes a significant contribution to the national transport infrastructure, with multiple daily freight trains, many being movement of containers. The 29-34-hour passenger trip between Hanoi and Ho Chi Minh City is very popular both with locals and foreign visitors. Accommodations are: hard seat, soft seat, 4 berth sleeper, and 6 berth sleeper. Coastal resorts such as Huế, Hội An, and Nha Trang lie along the route and generate considerable tourist traffic. There are no travel restraints in place, and tickets for most trains can be purchased on-line. In the border region, the Sapa line to the north is a very popular tourist attraction, with first class accommodations available. East of Hanoi, the line is dual gauge, with through trains to China available. Visas are required to book cross-border trains. The Ho Chi Minh City–Hanoi line has been rebuilt and upgraded, and damage from the Vietnam War repaired until the 2000s.

== Projects ==
There is a long-term plan to build a completely new standard-gauge line to connect the two main cities. New international routes to Phnom Penh and thus via Bangkok to Singapore are also under consideration. A parliamentary resolution of 2005 proposed that foreign investors be invited to invest in Vietnam Railways. On September 11, 2008, the Cambodian Ministry of Transportation announced a new railway line with the total length of 257 km (160 miles) will connect Phnom Penh with Loc Ninh (Binh Phuoc province), Vietnam. This US$550 million project has been carefully investigated by Chinese experts and is about to be carried out in the near future. Vietnam is extending its network to Loc Ninh. In August 2010, the government announced plans to build two sections of standard-gauge railway, one from Hanoi to Vinh and the other from Ho Chi Minh City to Nha Trang.

Although on the face of things the possibility of a good return might appear small, there are precedents: the lines into China have benefited from Chinese investment and, more recently, Japanese investment was spent on the Hai Van Tunnel project, a new road tunnel alongside the north-south rail line near Da Nang.

At a more local level, the picturesque hill town and resort of Đà Lạt was once connected by a scenic little rack railway to the main north-south line at Thap Cham. Although there is now little visible trace of the trackbed in the green and fertile landscape, local businesses have secured a promise of government funding for its reinstatement, to benefit tourism in the area. Currently, the only railway at Đà Lạt is an 8 km (5 miles) remnant from the old railway connection that runs from Đà Lạt station to the nearby village of Trại Mát. This is run as a tourist attraction.

Other projects likely to receive foreign money are proposed light rail systems within Hanoi.

=== Connection with Laos ===
A project to connect the Vietnamese Railway system with Laos is currently underway. The Laos-Vietnam railway system, connecting Thakhek District in Khammouane Province, Laos, to the Laos-Vietnam border, is expected to open for public use in 2028. The new railway will enhance Laos’ socio-economic development and become a reliable source of revenue for the Lao Government's long-term budget. The railway system will also enhance Laos' connectivity as a transport and trade hub within and outside the Southeast Asia (Asean).

=== High-speed rail plans on hold ===
Vietnam Railways also planned a 1,630 km (1,013 mi) high-speed standard gauge link from its capital Hanoi in the north to Ho Chi Minh City in the south, capable of running at 250 to 300 km/h (155 to 186 mph). It was planned to have an initial travel time of 9 hours and to make a series of improvements over time to eventually reduce the time to 5 hours. The current single track line has journey times from just under thirty hours.

The funding of the $33 billion line was to come mostly from the Vietnamese government, with the help of Japanese aid (on the understanding that Japanese firms would engineer the bulk of the project). In 2010, there was an unsuccessful push to fund the project, and efforts to promote the project have fallen off since then.

The timetable called for the initial construction (the 9-hour line) to be completed in 2016, and the line improvements (the 5-hour line) by 2025. At one point, the Vietnamese prime minister had set a target to complete the line by 2013. Approval was delayed several times, and in May 2010, the plan was finally rejected by the government.

== Locomotives ==
#	Type	Units	Power	Gauge
1	D8E	2 (retired)	871 horsepower (650 kW)	1000 mm
2	D12E	32	1,200 horsepower (890 kW)	1000 mm
3	D18E	16	1,800 horsepower (1,300 kW)	1000 mm
4	LD-110-M-VN2/D11H	23	1,100 horsepower (820 kW)	1000 mm
5	CKD7F/D19E "Đối mới"	100	1,951 horsepower (1,455 kW) & 3,190 horsepower (2,380 kW)	1000 mm
6	D9E/D10E GE U8B	30	900 horsepower (670 kW) & 1,000 horsepower (750 kW)	1000 mm
7	YMD4/D13E	22	1,300 horsepower (970 kW)	1000 mm
8	D5H	13	500 horsepower (370 kW)	1000 mm
9	D10H (China Railways DFH21)	20	1,000 horsepower (750 kW)	1000 mm
10	D4H	77	400 horsepower (300 kW)	1000 mm
11	SDD3/D19Er vi	5	1,950 horsepower (1,450 kW)	1435 mm
12	CKD4D/D15E	8	5,910 horsepower (4,410 kW)	1000 mm
13	D14E	5	1,400 horsepower (1,000 kW)	1435 mm
14	SIEMENS Asiarunner AR15VR/D20E	16	2,000 horsepower (1,500 kW)	1000 mm

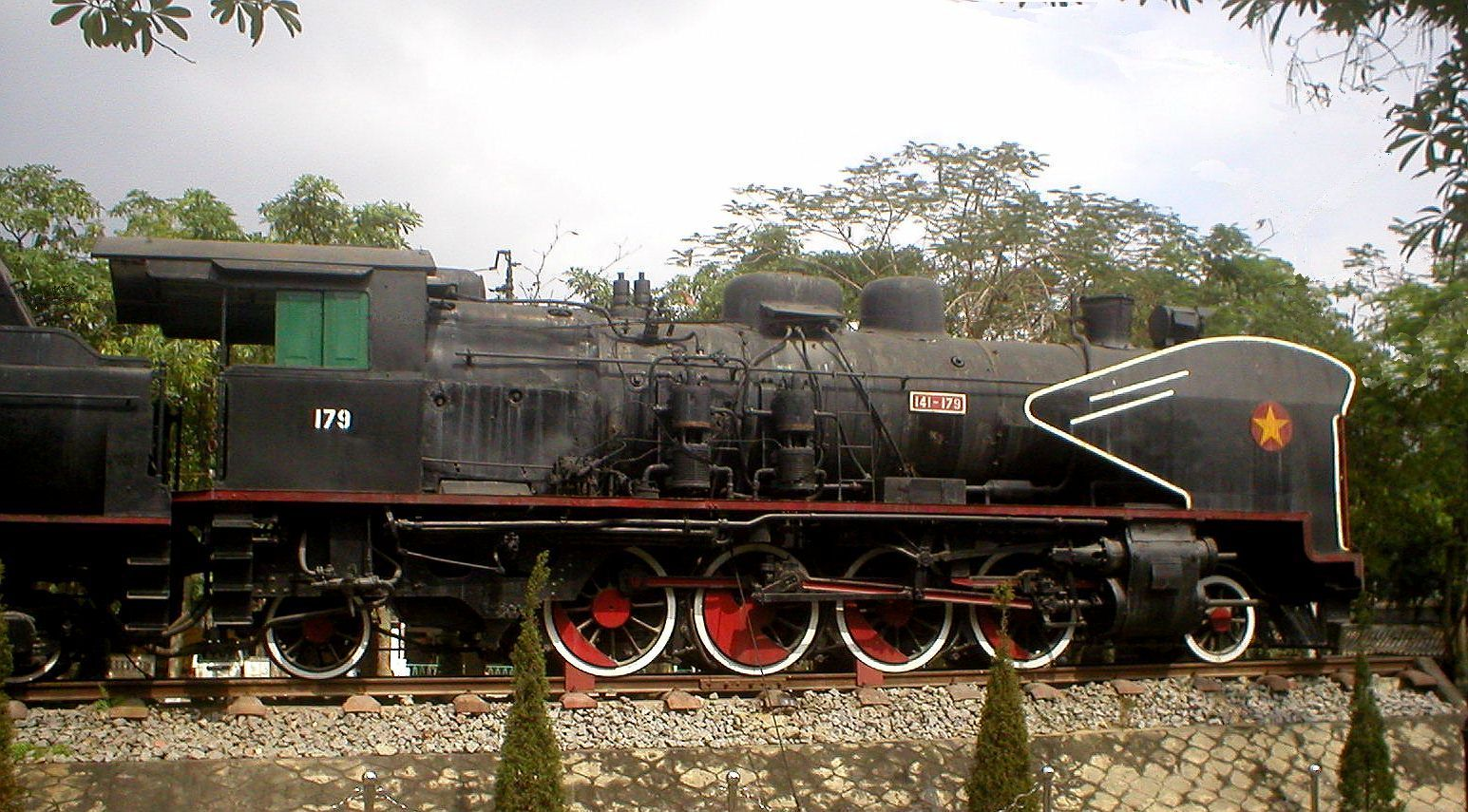
141-179 steam locomotive exhibited in Vinh railway station.

- TY8
- TY6P

== Overview ==
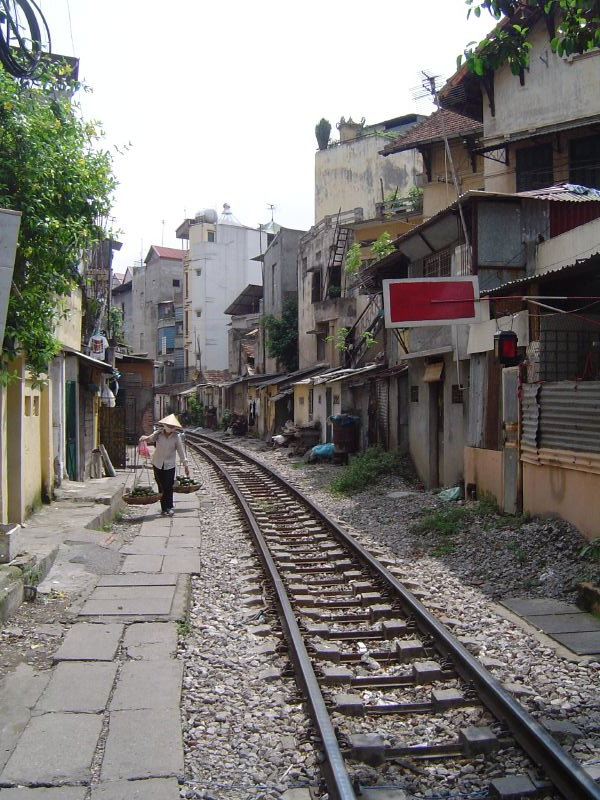
A section of metre-gauge line in Hanoi.

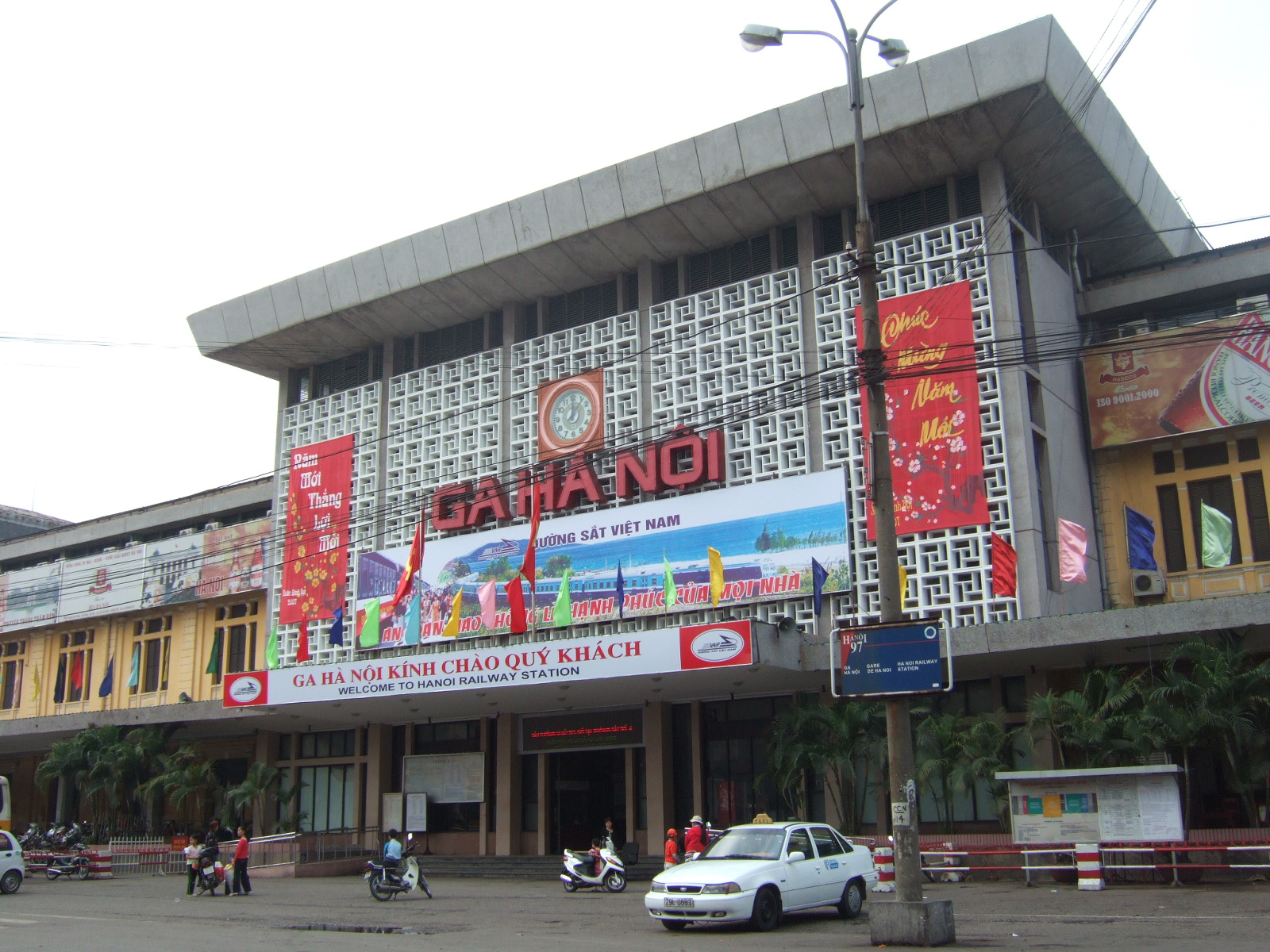
Hanoi Railway Station

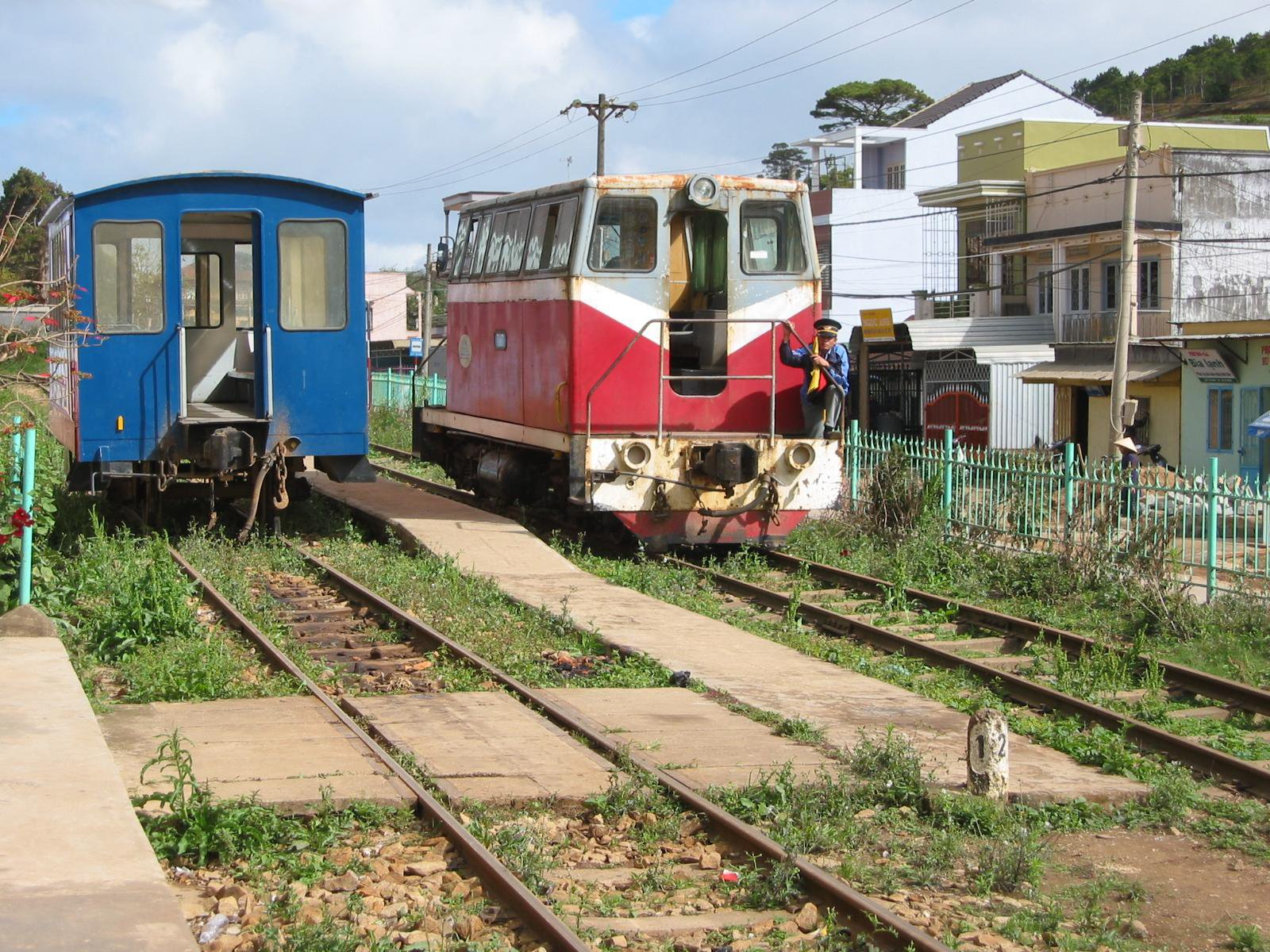
Shunting the locomotive to the other end at Trại Mát station on the Đà Lạt - Trại Mát line

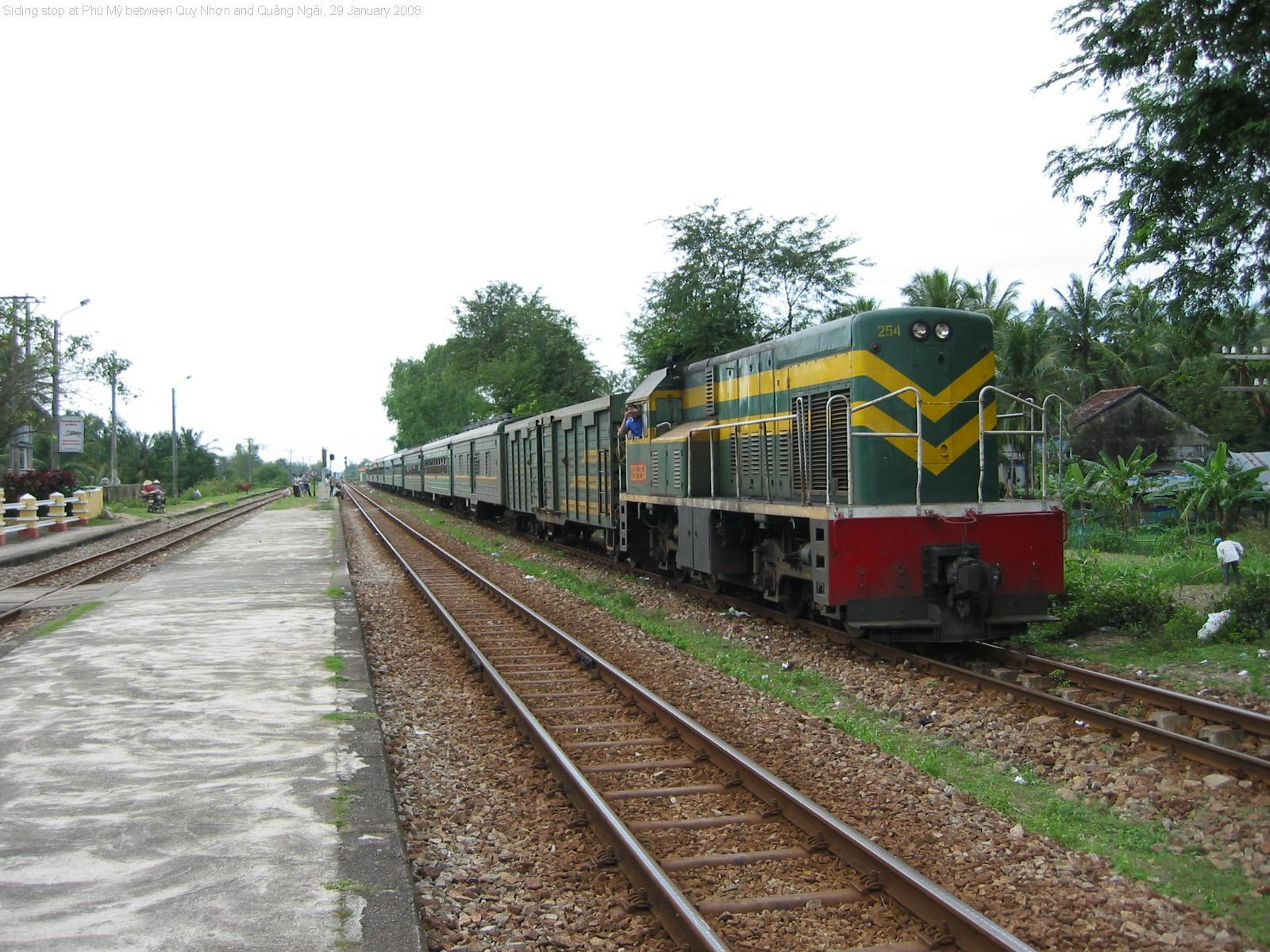
A local train hauled by a D9E/10E locomotive on a passing siding at Phù Mỹ, between Quy Nhơn and Quảng Ngãi

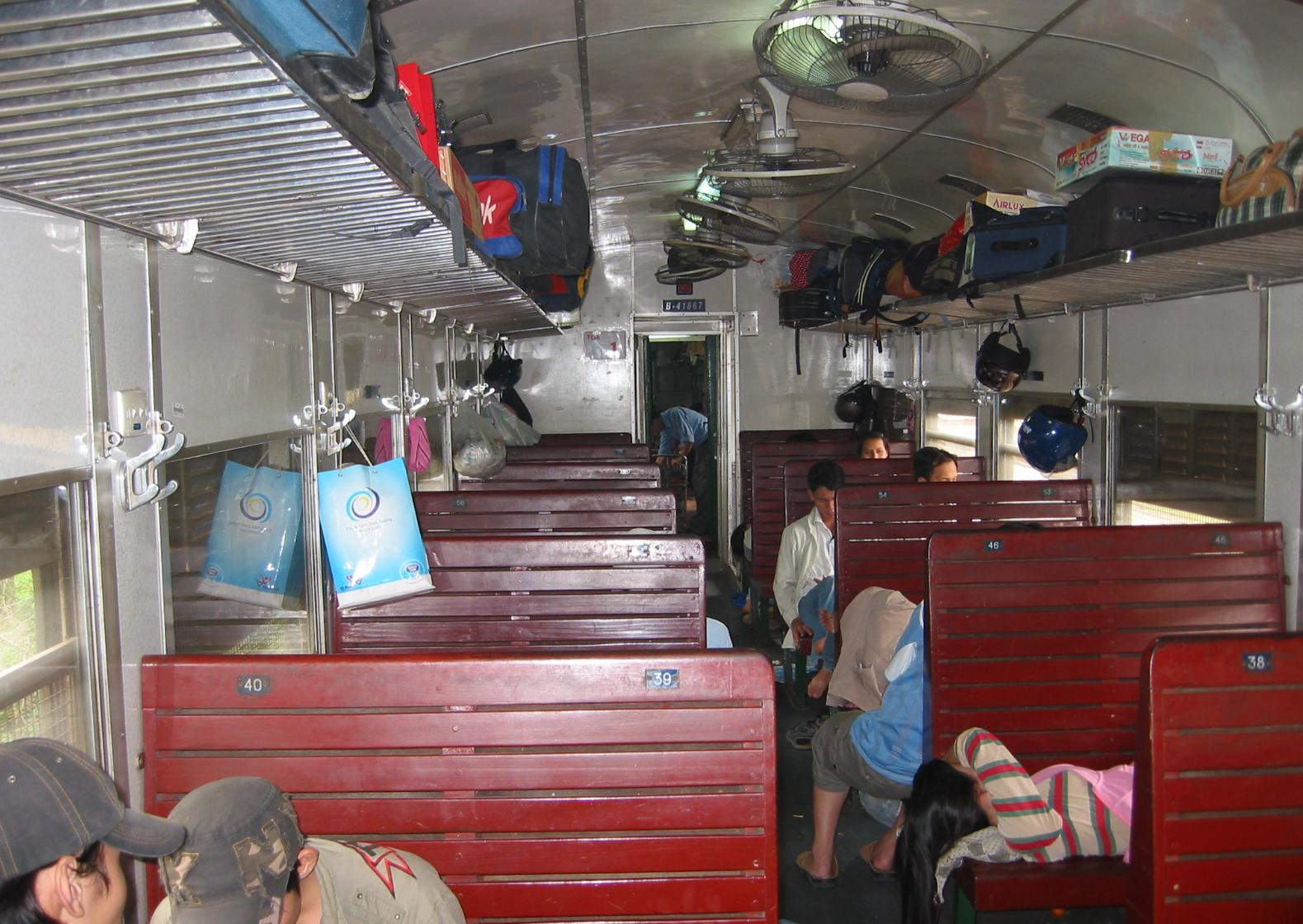
Hard seater coach of a local day train on the North-South line

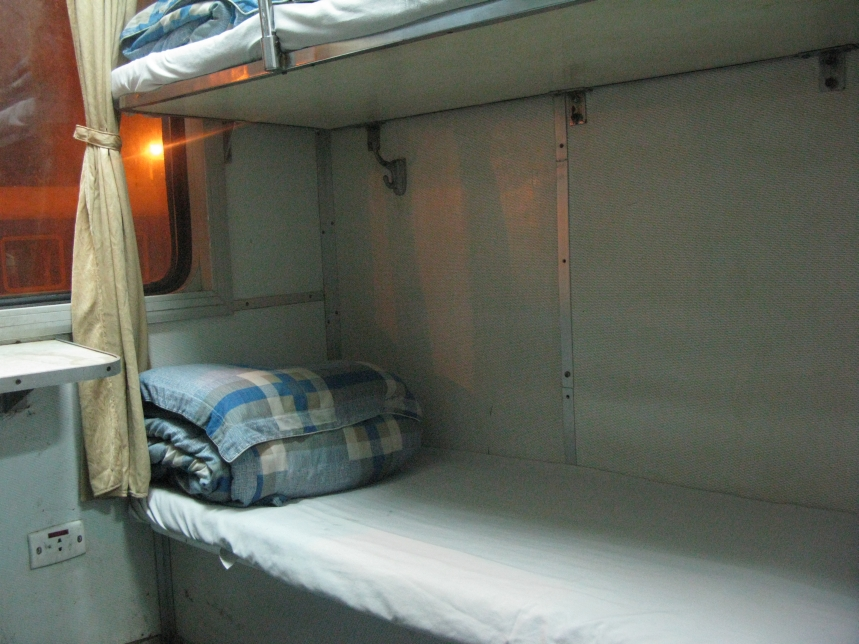
Beds in passenger coaches

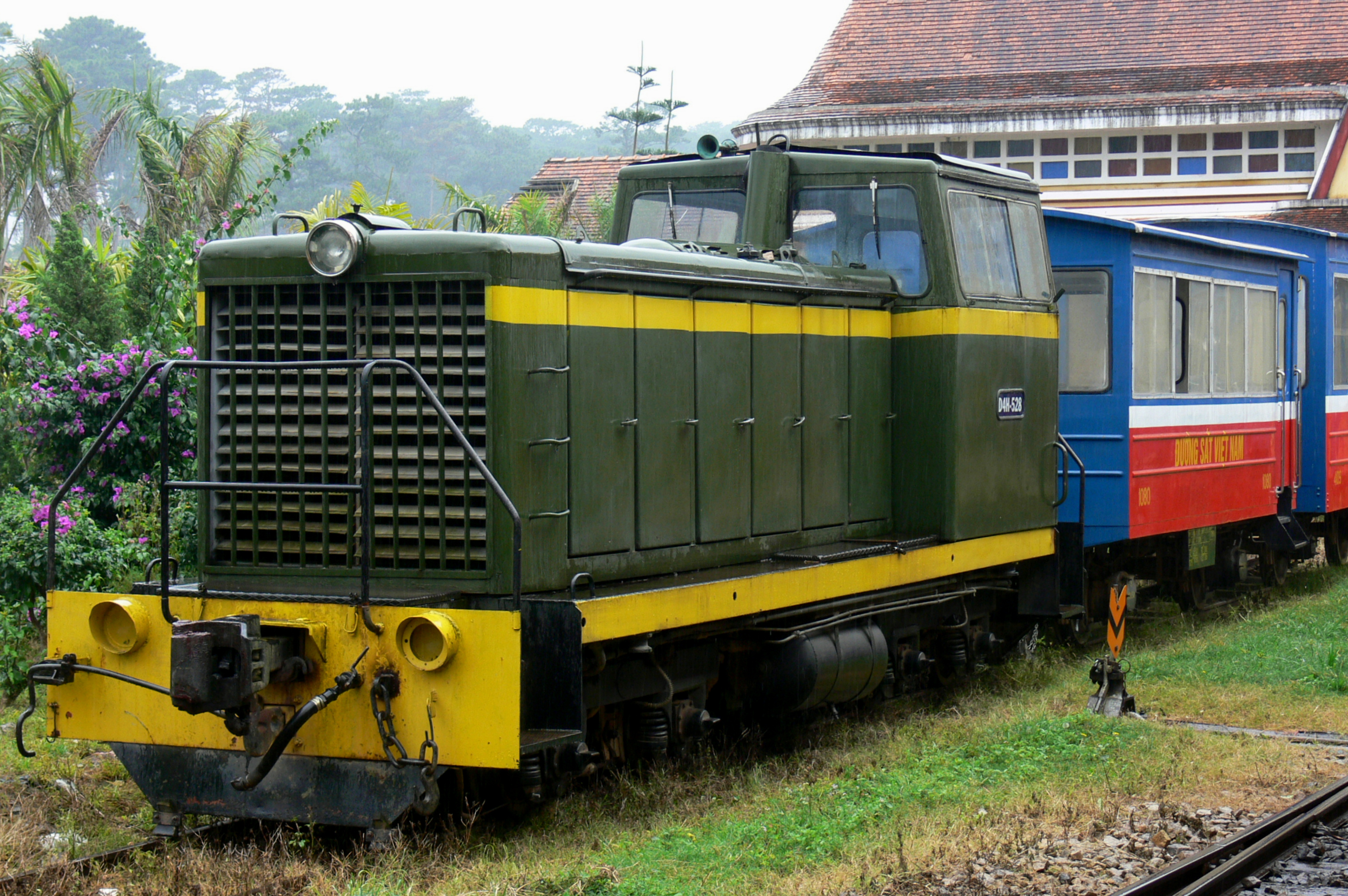
D4H-528, Da Lat–Thap Cham Railway

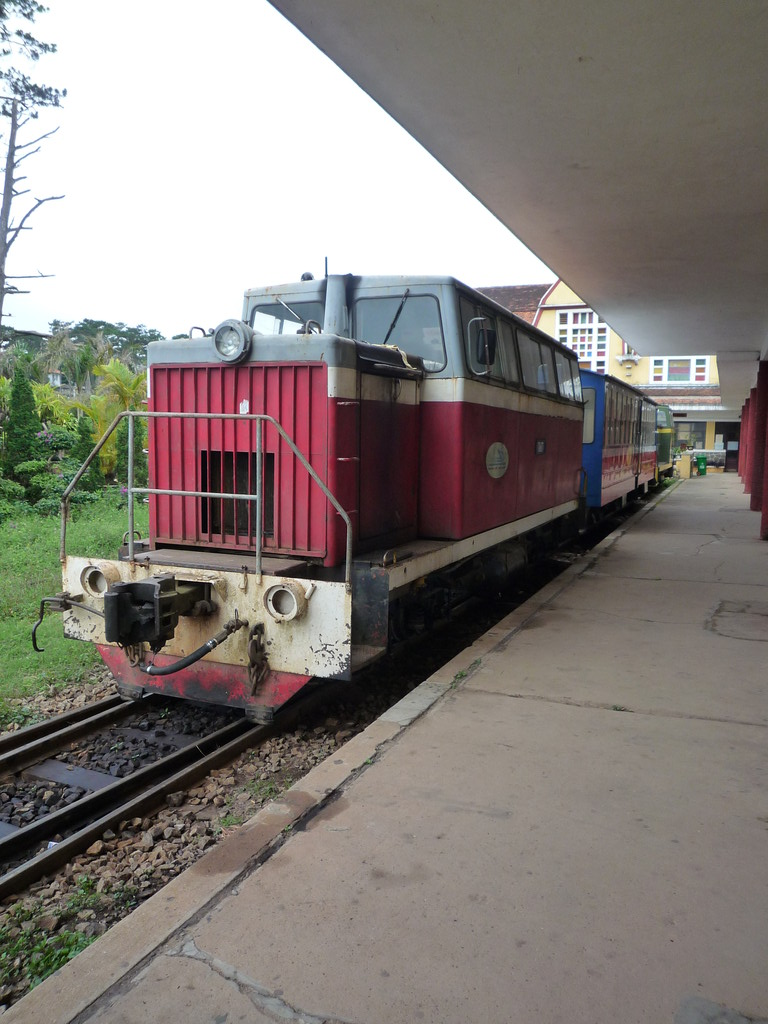
TY6P, Da Lat–Thap Cham Railway

=== Routes ===
- North-South
- Local
- Hanoi - Nanning - Beijing (operated by China Railway)

=== Lines ===
- Hanoi-Saigon Railway
- Hanoi-Lao Cai Railway
- Hanoi-Quan Trieu Railway
- Hanoi-Dong Dang Railway
- Hanoi-Haiphong Railway
- Kep-Ha Long Railway

=== Stations (in order going northbound) ===
- Saigon station
- Ninh Hòa station
- Nha Trang station
- Diêu Trì station
- Quảng Ngãi station
- Đà Nẵng station
- Huế station
- Đồng Hới station
- Vinh station
- Hải Phòng station
- Ninh Binh station
- Nam Định station
- Phủ Lý station
- Hanoi station
- Đồng Đăng station
- Lào Cai station
- Biên Hòa station
- Bồng Sơn station
- Đức Phổ station
- Núi Thành station
- Tam Kỳ station
- Trà Kiệu station
- Tháp Chàm station
- Phan Thiết station

=== Gauges ===
- 1,000 mm (3 ft 3 3/8 in) (2,169 km (1,348 mi))
- 1,435 mm (4 ft 8 1/2 in) (standard gauge, 178 km (111 mi))
- 1,435 mm (4 ft 8 1/2 in) and 1,000 mm (3 ft 3 3/8 in) (dual gauge, 253 km (157 mi))

=== Trackage ===
- Total 3,160 km (1,960 mi)
- 506 km (314 mi) of siding

=== Rolling stock ===
- 331 diesel locomotives
- 34 steam locomotives
- 852 coaches
- 3922 cars

=== Hotels ===
- Hai Can Nam Hotel
- Saigon Railway Hotel
- Kham Thien Hotel
- Mat Son Hotel
- Sam Son Hotel
- Ha Thanh Hotel
- Le Ninh Hotel
- Nha Trang Railway Hotel
- Ca Na Railway Hotel
- Da Lat Railway Hotel
- Ky Dong Hotel
- Hai Van Bac Hotel
- Mua Xuan Hotel

== See also ==
General information
- Rail transport in Vietnam
- Transport in Vietnam
- Narrow-gauge railway (heavy duty lines equivalent to standard, commercial speed of tilt-trains 160km/h)
- Metre-gauge railway (same as Vietnam)

Current Vietnamese rolling stock manufacturers

- Haiphong Carriage Company
- Gia Lam Train Company

Rapid transit projects in Vietnam

- Ho Chi Minh City Metro
- Hanoi Metro
- Hanoi BRT
