= Gia Lam Train Company =

Vietnamese railcar manufacturer

Gia Lam Train Company (Vietnamese: Công ty Cổ phần Xe lửa Gia Lâm) is a Vietnamese railcar manufacturer. The company supplies cars to Vietnam Railways. Gia Lam is also the name of the main station in Hanoi, and also an airport.

== Products ==
- Air suspension bogie for coach
- Bogie for coach
- Air-conditioned double-deck car
- Air-conditioned buffet car
- Would be used coaches

== See also ==
- Transport in Vietnam
- Gia Lâm (disambiguation)
