= Brigade 918 (Vietnam) =

The 918th Air Brigade is a major air transport unit of the Vietnam People's Air Force, formerly known as the 918th Air Regiment. It is located at Gia Lam Airport near Hanoi.

The fall of South Vietnam on April 30, 1975, opened a new era for Vietnam, setting high demands for the air force. On July 5, 1975, the Ministry of Defense decided to form the 918th Air Regiment, stationed at Tan Son Nhat Airport, using transport aircraft to be ready to fight for the defence of the Fatherland and military transport, serving national security and civil service. The 918th Air Regiment quickly began carrying out military transport between north–south.
