= Haiphong Carriage Company =

Vietnamese railcar manufacturer

Haiphong Carriage Company is a Vietnamese railcar manufacturer. The company supplies cars to Vietnam Railways.

== Products ==
- Air-conditioned soft seat coach
- Hard berth coach
- Berth coach
- Double-deck car
- Dining car
- Civil service and generator car
- Wagon G-G
- Container car
- Composite car P
- Covered car
- Air suspension bogie
- Window car
- Soft seat
- Other spare parts
