= D19E =

Series of diesel locomotives

Vietnam Railways D19E
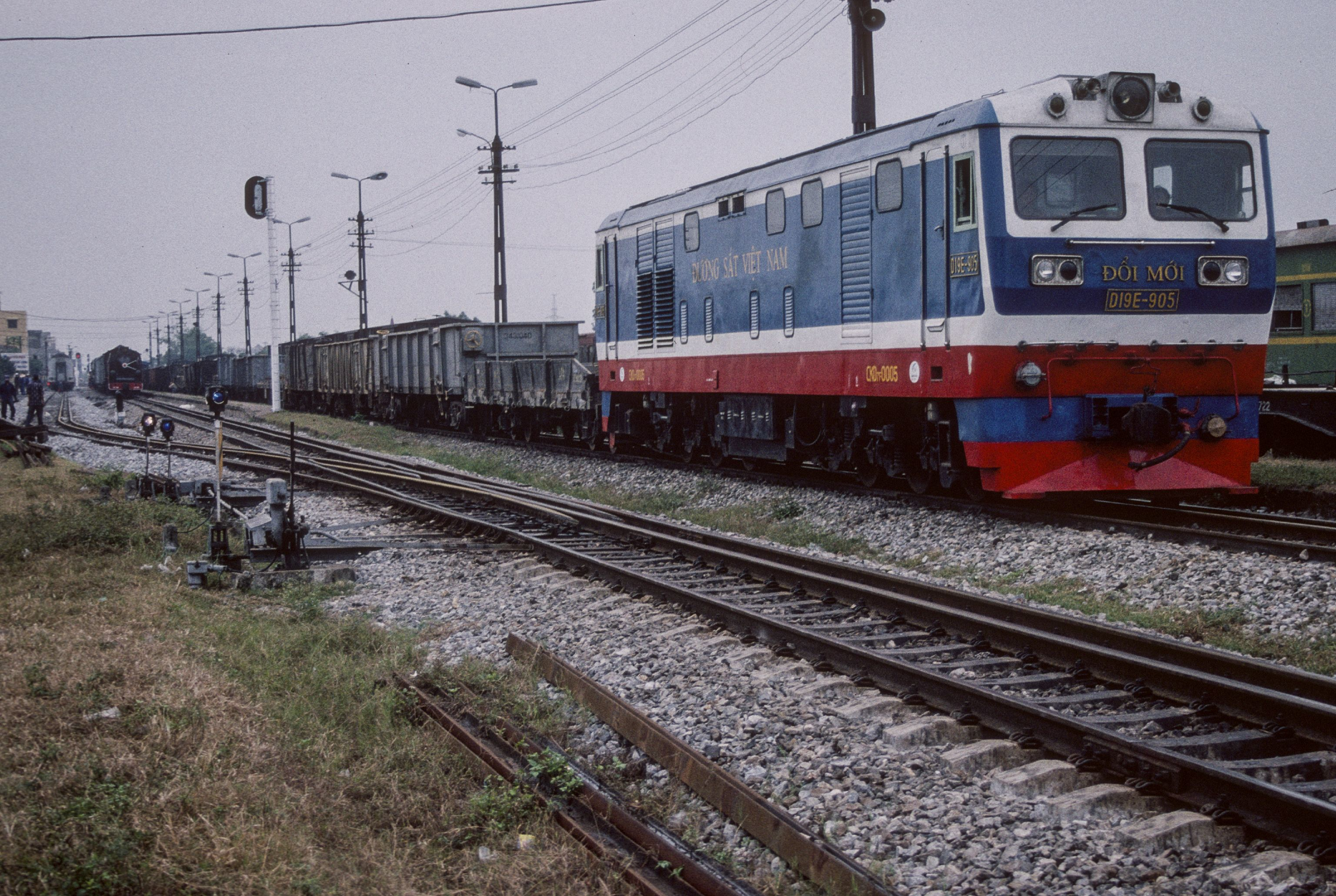
- D19E-905
Type and origin
- Power type: Diesel
- Builder: CRRC Ziyang Locomotive Co., Ltd.
- Model: CKD7F
- Build date: 2001 to present
- Total produced: 100
Specifications
- Configuration
  - UIC: Co'Co'
- Gauge: 1,000 mm (3 ft 3 3/8 in)
- Wheel diameter: 1,000 mm (39 in)
- Length: 16,892 mm (55 ft 5.0 in)
- Width: 2,900 mm (9 ft 6 in)
- Height: 3,900 mm (12 ft 10 in)
- Axle load: 13 t
- Loco weight: 81 t
- Fuel type: Diesel
- Fuel capacity: 3,500 L (770 imp gal)
- Engine type: Caterpillar 3512B
- Alternator: JF221
- Transmission: electric AC-DC
- Train brakes: air brakes
Performance figures
- Maximum speed: 120 km/h (75 mph)
- Power output: 1,455 kW (1,951 hp)
- Tractive effort: 250 kN (at μ = 0.327)
Career
- Operators: Vietnam Railways
- Class: D19E
- Locale: Vietnam
- Delivered: 2001
- First run: 2001

The D19E, also known as Đổi mới, is a series of diesel locomotives currently used on the Vietnamese railway network.

== Design ==
The series is one of the most recently acquired by state railway company Vietnam Railways; 40 were in service as of 2005, 80 in 2012. and 100 in 2026 The series, of the diesel electric locomotive CKD7F, was constructed by Chinese manufacturer CRRC Ziyang Locomotive Co. Ltd.

No. 901 to 920 (built 2001–2002) and 921 to 940 (built 2004) have a more angular body. No. 941 to 960 (built 2007–2008) were built with a rounded front; in No. 961 to 980 (built 2011–2012) the windows and headlights were modified and the front air intake omitted. From No. 941 the final assembly took place at the Gia Lâm works of Vietnam Railways. No. 981 to 1000 (built 2026) continues to utilise the CAT 3512B diesel engine producing 2,380 kW or 3,190 hp, Nevertheless, the design mirrors in part the modular concept found on CRRC's other locomotives, including the HXD1D, FXN5C, DF11G and DF8B. The main frame is one such module. The drivers cabins are also modular components at the Gia Lâm works of Vietnam Railways.

The engine is the 16V280ZJG model, similar to that used in the DF11G and DF8B, except with 12 cylinders instead of 16.

Locomotives 981, 982 and 983 are visually confirmed to have been delivered to Vietnam, having been spotted in Yen Vien station.

Locomotives 984 - 988

== Accidents and incidents ==
On March 12, 2005, locomotive No.909 was involved in an accident at Lang Co while pulling the E1 train (later renamed to SE1). 8 of the 13 coaches derailed, claiming the lives of 12 people and injuring hundreds. The cause for the accident was over-speeding.

On 10 March 2015 locomotive No.968 collided with a lorry on a level crossing near Dien Sanh while pulling the SE5.

On May 24, 2018, locomotive No. 927 towing the SE19 carrying 400 passengers had an accident in Thanh Hoa because of a collision with a truck, causing two deaths: driver Nguyen The Hung (born 1976) and Nguyen Xuan De (born 1985) The accident investigated was caused by two guards who forgot to close the barriers.

On January 27, 2022, locomotive No. 946 hauling the SE4 was involved in an accident where the train smashed into a lorry carrying wood at Km 46+270 which made a driver injured.

On January 14, 2023, locomotive No. 908 pulling the train SE3 bumped into a van on a level crossing near Giap Bat, Hanoi. The result was bad damage to the van, and other express trains including the one involved had to cross the section slowly.

On January 28, 2023, locomotive No. 908 pulling the train SE5 was damaged in an accident in Cho Tia, Hanoi, when the express collided with a truck that was stuck on level crossing.

On March 13, 2024, locomotive No. 921 pulling the SE8 crashed into a lorry on level crossing.

== Galleries ==
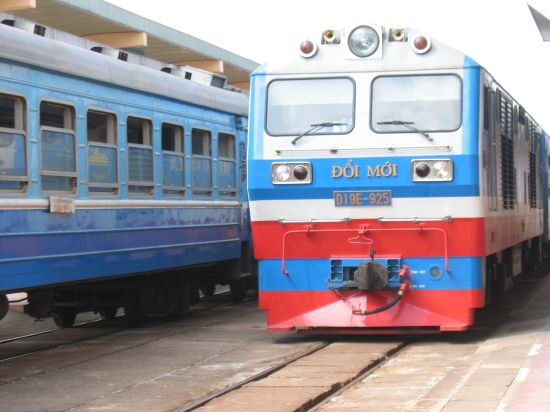
D19E-925

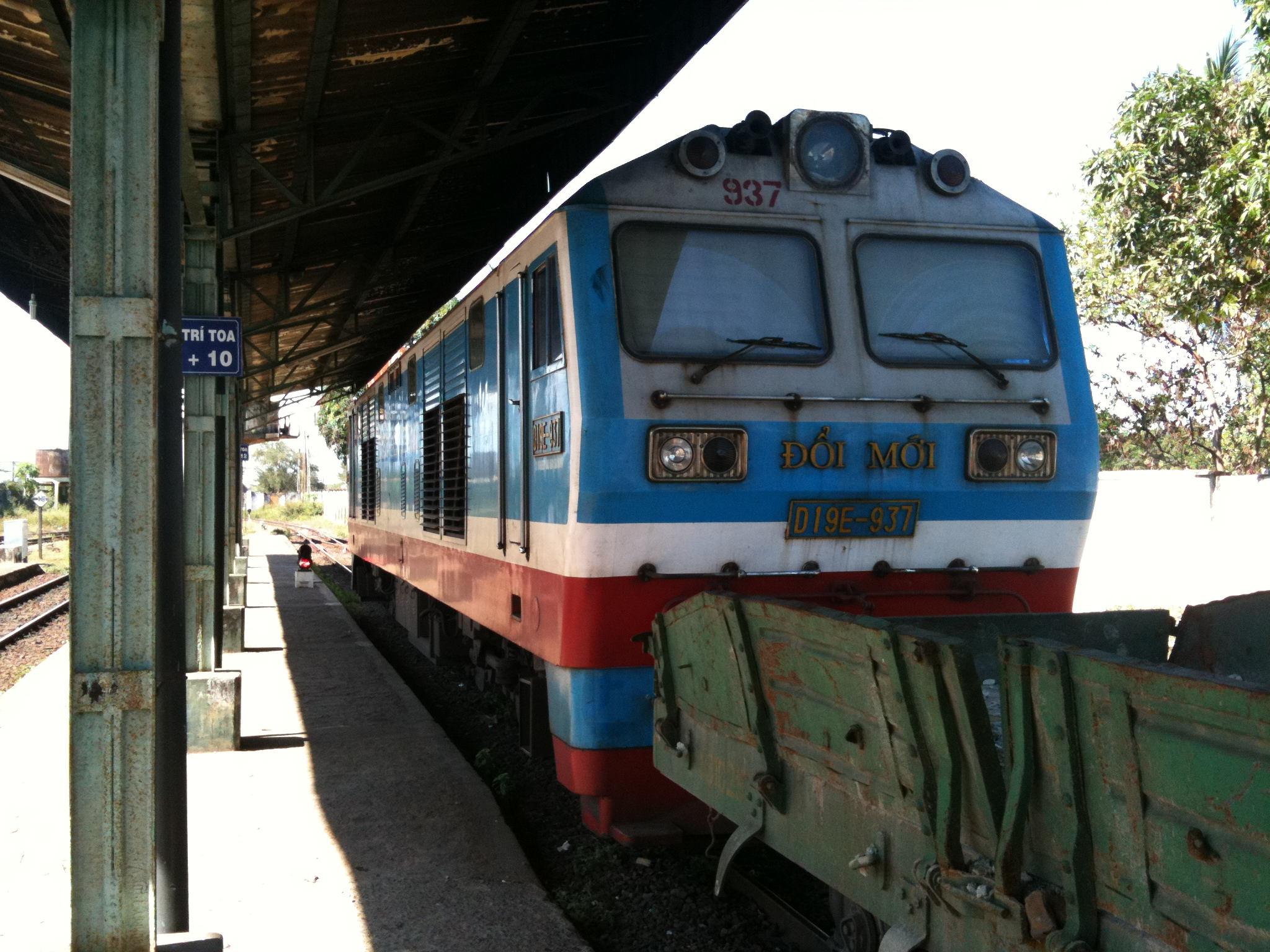
D19E-937 at Binh Thuan Station

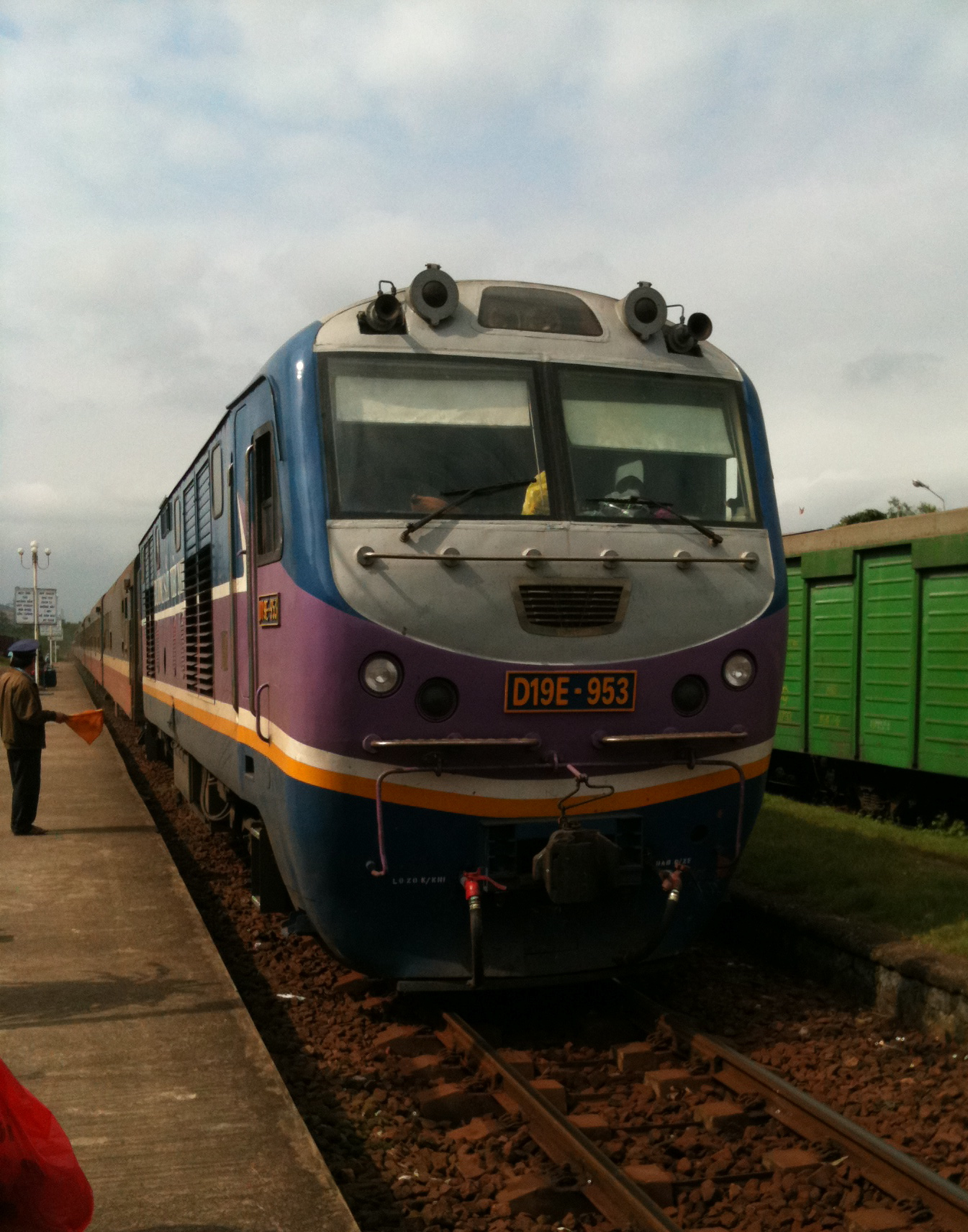
D19E-951 at Diêu Trì station on February 15, 2011

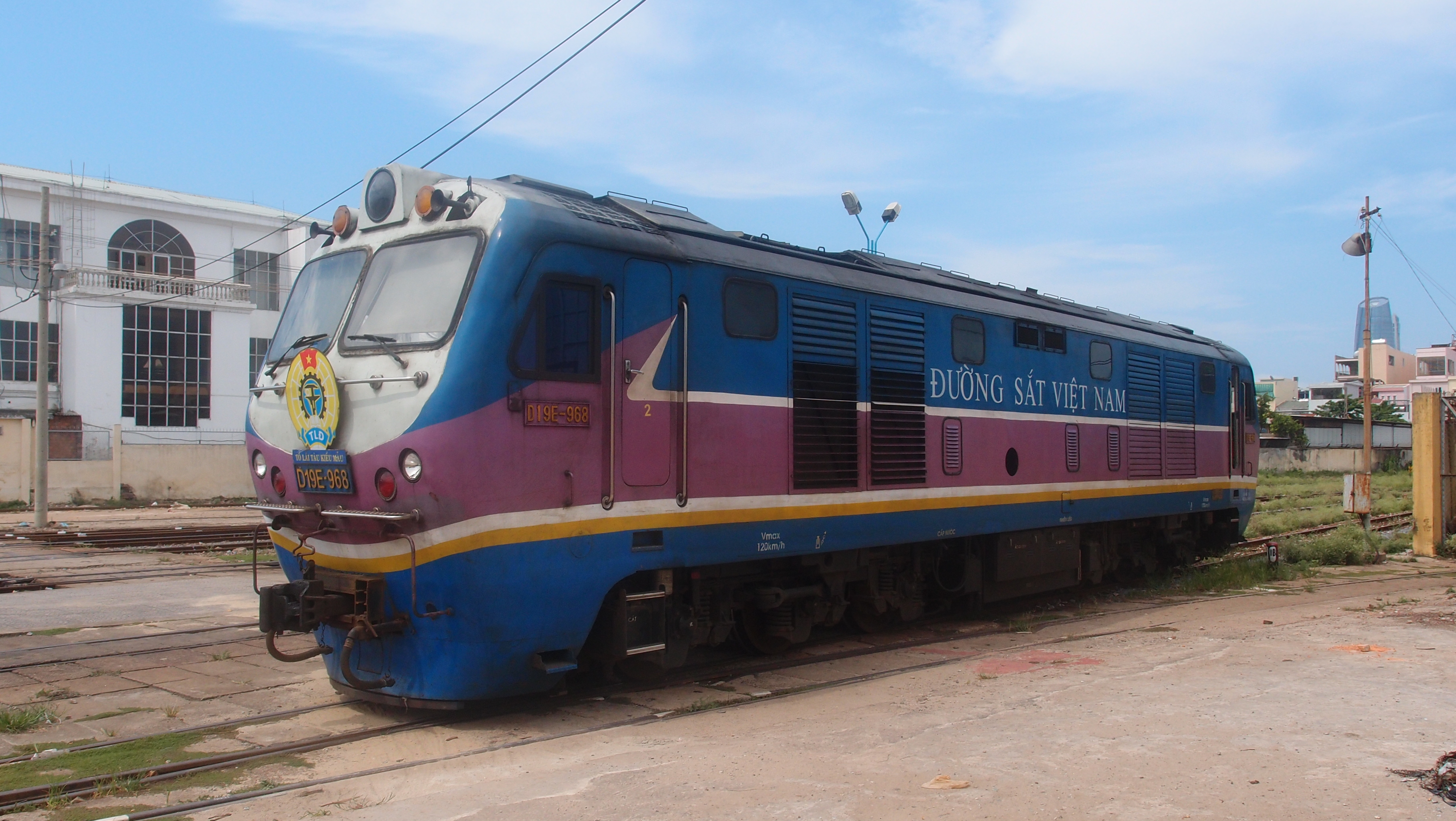
D19E-968 at Đà Nẵng station on May 7, 2014 – Note different windows and headlights

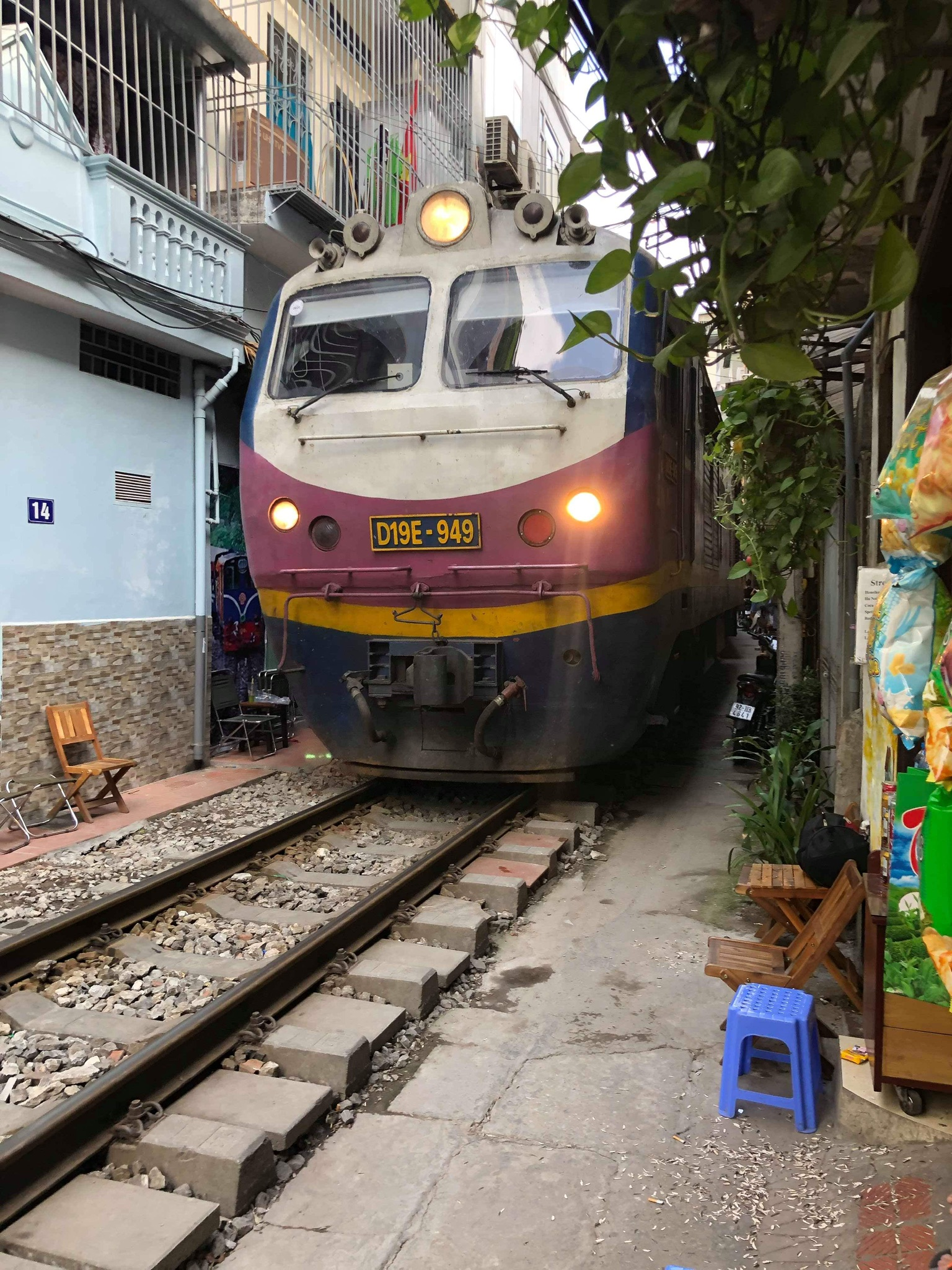
D19E-949 arriving into Hanoi Station
