= Asiarunner =

Diesel-electric locomotive

Siemens Asiarunner AR15, AR20
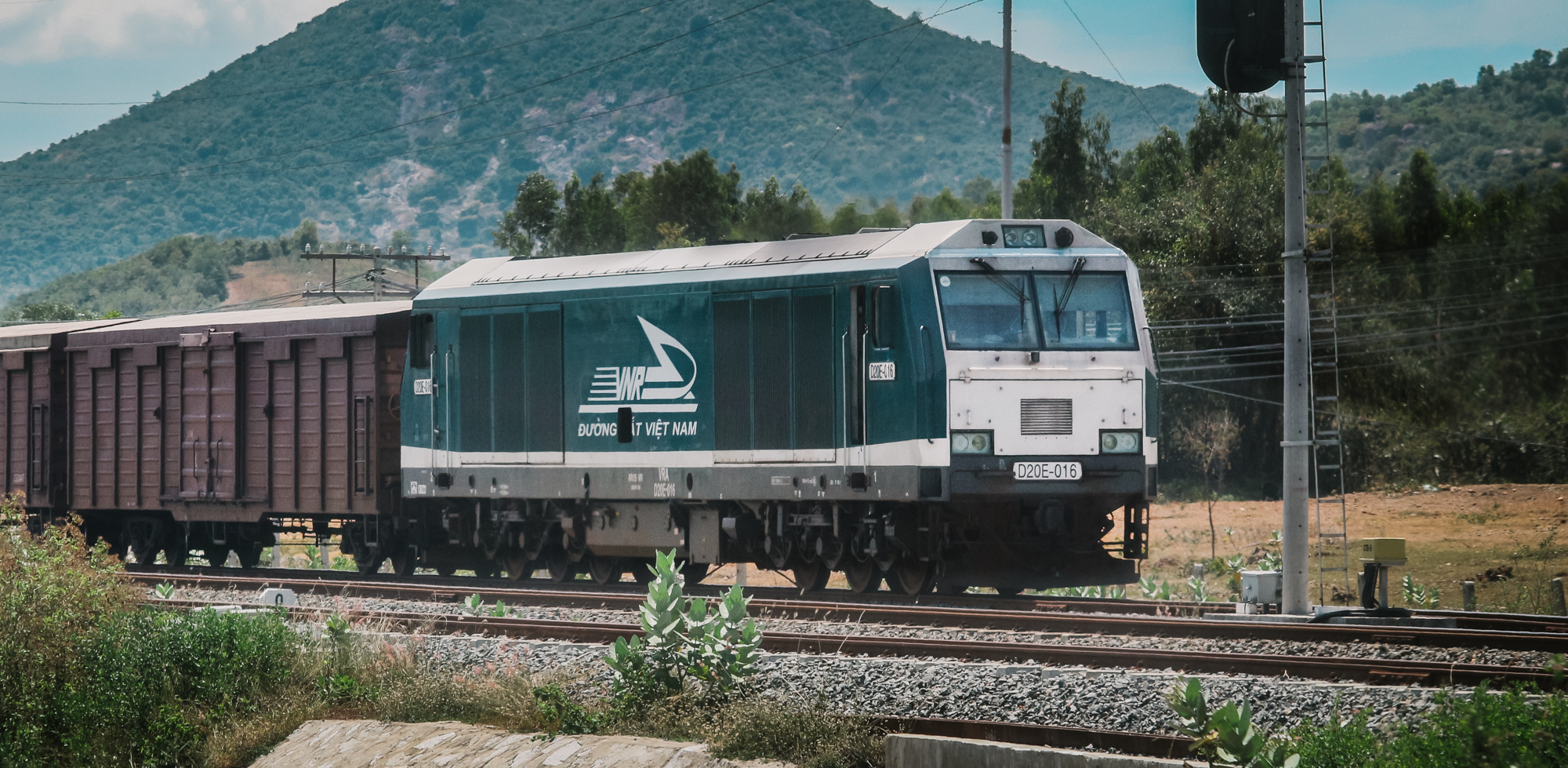
- A Vietnam Railways D20E pulling freight along National Route 1 (Vietnam) in 2024
Type and origin
- Power type: Diesel
- Build date: 2006? (Ordered 2004)
- Total produced: AR15 VR: 16 (for Vietnam Railways)
Specifications
- Configuration
  - UIC: Co′Co′
- Gauge: AR15: 1,000 mm (3 ft 3 3/8 in) metre gauge to 1,676 mm (5 ft 6 in); AR20: 1,067 mm (3 ft 6 in)
- Length: 19,180 mm (62 ft 11 1/8 in)
- Width: 2,688 mm (8 ft 9 7/8 in); 2,950 mm (9 ft 8 1/8 in) including mirrors
- Height: 3,945 mm (12 ft 11 3/8 in)
- Axle load: AR15: 3.5 to 16 t (3.4 to 15.7 long tons; 3.9 to 17.6 short tons); AR20: 16 t (16 long tons; 18 short tons)
- Loco weight: AR15 VR: 81t
- Fuel type: Diesel
- Fuel capacity: 4,000 L (880 imp gal; 1,100 US gal)
- Prime mover: MTU 12V4000R41
- Engine type: V12 diesel engine
Performance figures
- Maximum speed: 120 km/h (75 mph)
- Power output: AR15 1,500 kW (2,000 hp); AR20 2,000 kW (2,700 hp); AR15 ~1,220 kW (1,640 hp) at wheel
- Tractive effort: AR15: 260–320 kN (58,000–72,000 lb_{f}) starting AR20: 320 kN (72,000 lb_{f}) starting
Career
- Locale: Vietnam Railways

The Siemens Asiarunner locomotives are contemporaries to the Eurorunner class and are designed specifically for the South-East Asian market - in particular metre gauge - key features are a Co'Co' wheel arrangement (resulting in low axle loads) and good clearance (see Loading gauge)

== Development ==
Much of the development of the Asiarunner locomotive had to be done from scratch, since Siemens had no contemporary example of a narrow gauge, or of a locomotive that was built to a smaller loading gauge that UIC 505-1.

Nevertheless, the design mirrors in part the modular concept found in Siemens other locomotives (the Eurosprinter and Eurorunner). The main frame is one such module. The drivers cabins are also modular components.

Access to the main engine compartment is via the roof, which has three removable segments, there is a single side corridor which allows an escape route in the event of certain emergencies (compare the wide gauge Eurorunners which have two passageways)

The engine is a 12-cylinder MTU model - similar to that used in the Eurorunner except with 12 instead of 16 cylinders.

The locos can work in multiple with up to three connected.

== Operators ==
Whilst the Asiarunner was designed for use in Asia, Africa, South America and Australia, its only operator is Vietnam Railways, with 16 AR15s running passenger and freight services on its Hanoi – Da Nang – Ho Chi Minh City route.

== See also ==
- Siemens Eurorunner
- Siemens Eurosprinter
- Narrow gauge railways
- Rail transport in Vietnam
