= Gia Lam Airport =

Airport serving Hanoi, Vietnam

Gia Lam Airport Sân bay Gia Lâm
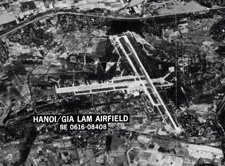
- Gia Lam Airfield in 1967

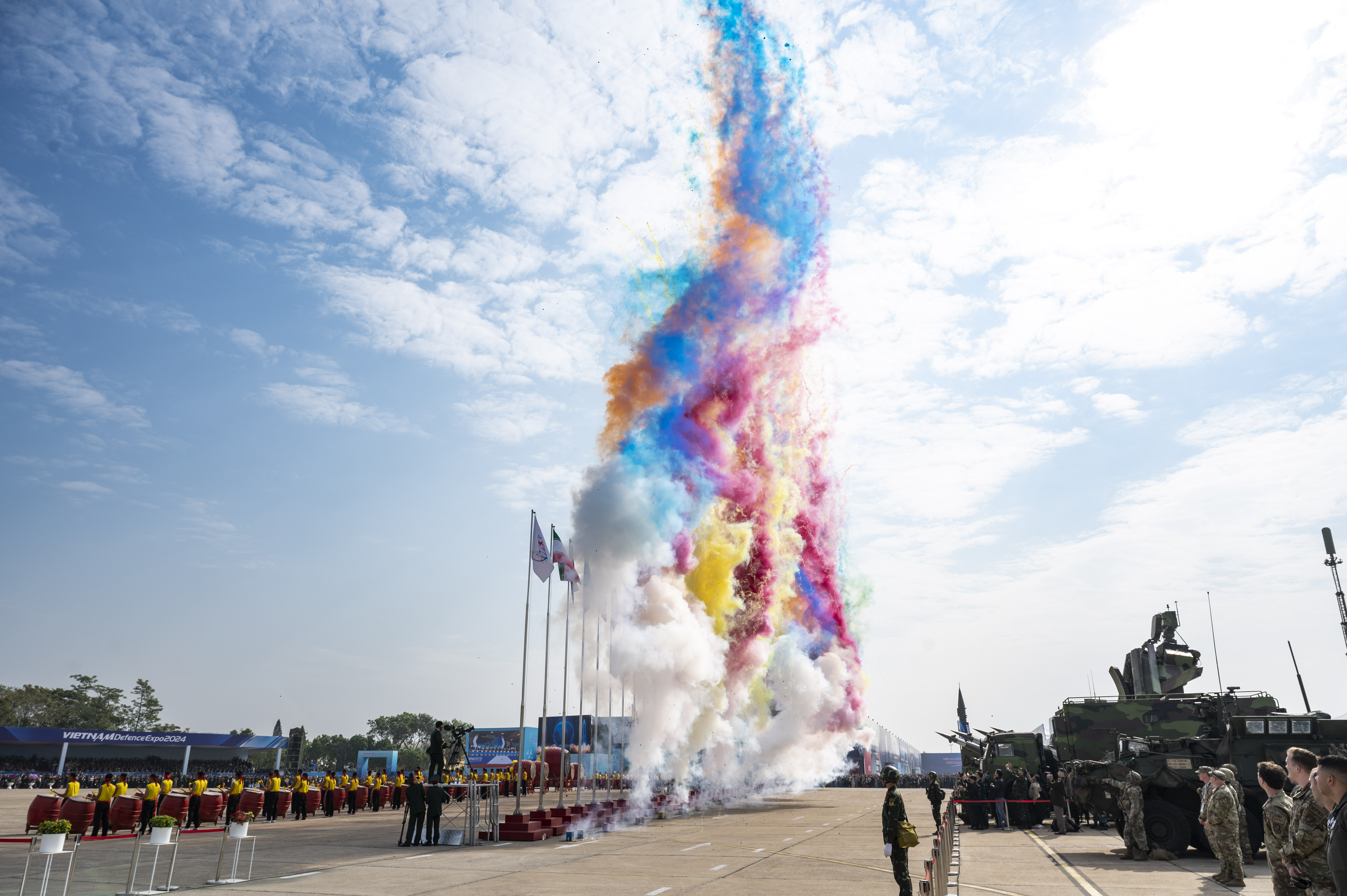
- Gia Lam hosting Vietnam Defence Expo in 2024.
- IATA: none; ICAO: VVGL

Summary
- Airport type: Public / Military
- Serves: Hanoi
- Location: Long Biên Ward
- Elevation AMSL: 15 m (49 ft)
- Coordinates: 21°02′27.51″N 105°53′09.64″E
- Interactive map of Gia Lam Airport

Runways
Direction	Length		Surface
Direction	m	ft	Surface
02/20	2,001	6,565	Asphalt

Gia Lam Airport (ICAO: VVGL) (Vietnamese: Sân bay Gia Lâm) is an airport in Hanoi, Vietnam, located in Long Biên Ward, on the eastern bank of the Red River. It is primarily a military field, used by the Vietnam Air Defence - Air Force. It is home to Brigade 918 (vi:Lữ_đoàn_Không_quân_918_(Việt_Nam)) carrying out air transport flights. The airfield was inaugurated in 1936, before the Japanese occupation of French Indochina. The airport is currently used for military training activities, as well as for chartered helicopter taxi flights for tourists visiting nearby attractions such as Ha Long Bay. There are plans to convert Gia Lam to a civilian airport, serving short flights to and from locations in Northern Vietnam.

== History ==
=== 1936–40 ===
Gia Lam Airfield (French: Aérogare de Gia Lam) was built in 1936 (90 years ago), according to an urban plan laid out by French architect Ernest Hébrard over a decade earlier. Hébrard was hired by the city of Hanoi's Urban Planning and Architecture Services department in 1923 to supervise a number of urban renewal projects, including a new industrial area in Gia Lâm District, on the eastern bank of the Red River. Hébrard's plan for Gia Lam included a renovated railway station, along with space for factories, industrial establishments, and the new airfield. Upon its completion, it was one of two major airfields in the Hanoi area, the other being the (now-disused) Bach Mai Airfield. The airfield itself was constructed according to a design by French architect Félix Godard.

=== 1940–46 ===
On September 26, 1940, as part of the Invasion of French Indochina, Japanese forces took possession of the airfield, maintaining control throughout World War II, until their surrender to the Việt Minh during the August Revolution. During the Japanese occupation period from early-on, Gia Lam had faced attacks from the combined forces of the RoCAF bombers escorted by AVG fighters, including a major offensive-strike operation on 22 January 1942, where RoCAF Tupolev SB-2 bombers from Taipingsi air base in Sichuan, rendezvoused with AVG fighter escort enroute to attacking the occupying Japanese forces stationed at Gia Lam. Soon after the end of WWII, the Democratic Republic of Vietnam was proclaimed following the August Revolution, with Việt Minh leader Hồ Chí Minh as head of government. France initially accepted the new government, but this position changed when negotiations about the future of Vietnam as a state within the French Union collapsed. Guerrilla fighting began between Việt Minh fighters and the French, and on December 19, 1946, in response to attacks on French installations in and around Hanoi, French troops re-occupied the airfield.

=== First Indochina War ===
Gia Lam and Bach Mai later became the two major logistics bases supporting French operations at the Battle of Dien Bien Phu. Much of the equipment sent to the remote French military base at Dien Bien Phu passed through Gia Lam airfield, including the ten French M24 Chaffee tanks assigned to the isolated stronghold in northwestern Vietnam, which were each dismantled into 180 individual parts and flown to Dien Bien Phu on heavy cargo aircraft. After their defeat at Dien Bien Phu and the following 1954 Geneva Peace Accords, French forces, obliged to leave Vietnam, handed over the airfield to the Viet Minh. Gia Lam airfield was thereafter taken over by Ho Chi Minh's North Vietnamese government and used by the VPAF as their main airbase in the Hanoi area.

=== Vietnam War ===
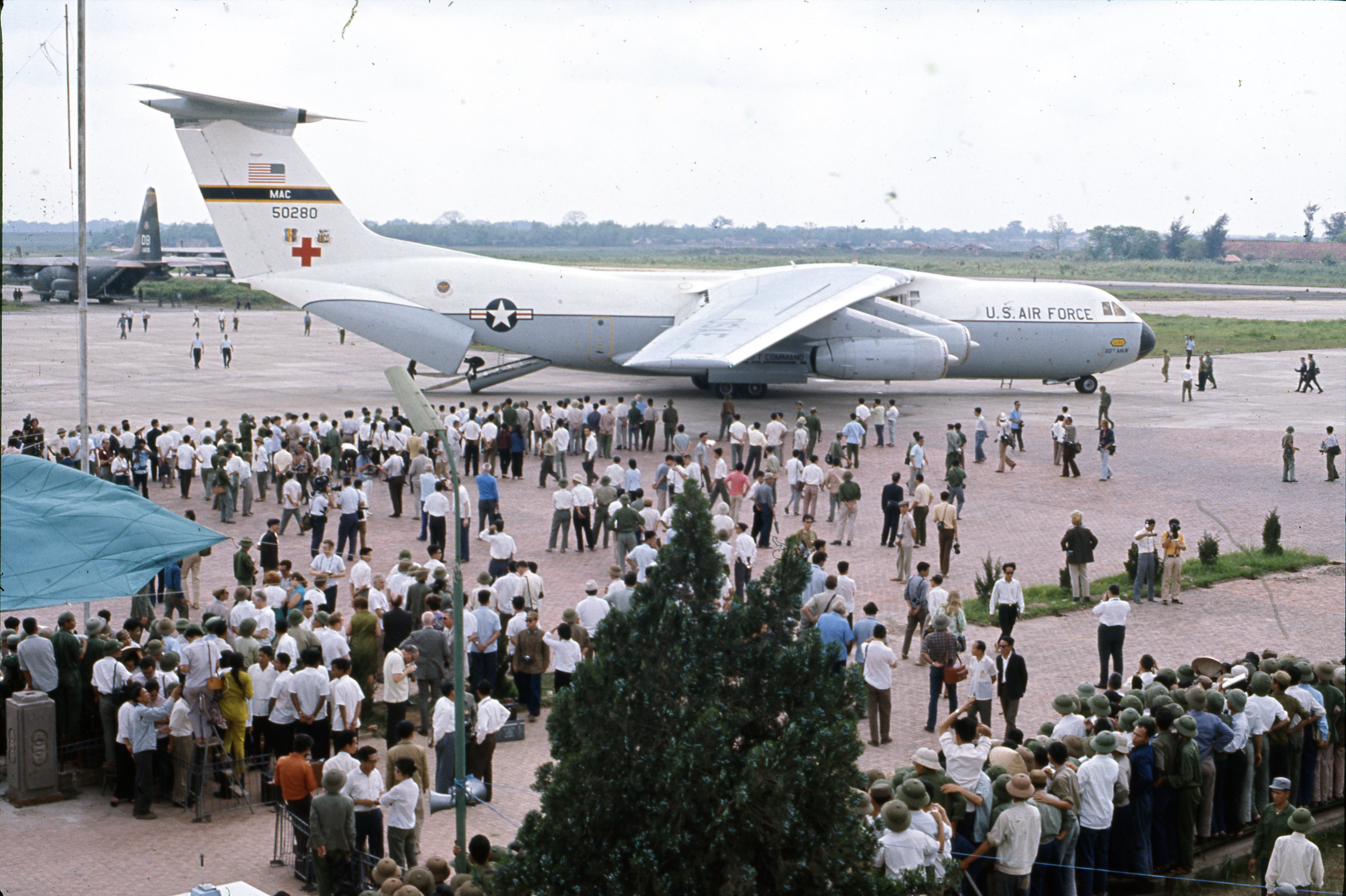
United States Air Force's airlifters at Gia Lam in 1970 to repatriate POWs.

During the Vietnam War, the American Joint Chiefs of Staff placed Gia Lam on a list of 94 recommended bombing targets in North Vietnam, identifying it as a major airbase and as a storage location for petroleum, oil and lubricants (POL). All North Vietnamese airfields were removed from the USAF's "restricted target" list in April 1967, and Gia Lam was one of six deemed suitable for fast jet operations. As a result, it sustained heavy damage as part of Operation Rolling Thunder, suffering repeated bomber attacks.

Following the cease-fire mandated by the Paris Peace Accords in January 1973, Gia Lam was the site of Operation Homecoming, the return of American POWs held by the North Vietnamese. The first repatriation, effected by the United States Air Force's Military Airlift Command, happened on February 12, 1973, when C-141s of the 63d Military Airlift Wing, flying from Clark Air Base in the Philippines, flew to Gia Lam and returned with a total of 116 former POWs. The first C-141 to return came to be known as the Hanoi Taxi, named after the writing on the flight engineer's panel by the POWs aboard the plane for the freedom flight. Arizona Senator John McCain was one of the POWs who flew home from Gia Lam on the Hanoi Taxi. From February 12 to April 4, there were 54 C-141 missions flying out of Hanoi, bringing the former POWs home.

== Facilities ==
At one time, the headquarters of national flag carrier Vietnam Airlines were located at Gia Lam Airport.

== Former airlines and destinations (until 1978) ==
Airlines	Destinations
Aeroflot	Moscow-Domodedovo, Moscow-Sheremetyevo
Air France	Akyab, Allahabad, Athens, Baghdad, Bangkok, Bushehr, Calcutta, Kastellorizo, Corfu, Damascus, Dezful, Jask, Jodhpur, Karachi, London-Croydon, Marseille, Naples, Paris-Orly, Rangoon, Vientiane
CAAC Airlines	Beijing-Capital, Guangzhou, Jakarta-Kemayoran, Kunming/Wujiaba, Nanning, Phnom Penh, Shanghai-Longhua, Shanghai-Hongqiao
Interflug	Berlin-Schönefeld
Pathet Lao Airlines	Vientiane
Royal Air Lao	Vientiane
Vietnam Civil Aviation	Bangkok, Beijing-Capital, Berlin-Schönefeld, Phnom Penh, Vientiane, Vinh

== Incidents and accidents ==
On April 8, 2008, a Soviet-built Antonov An-26 turboprop aircraft on a training mission crashed into a field in Thanh Trì District, in the outskirts of Hanoi, killing five Vietnamese military pilots. The plane took off from Gia Lam Airport, and crashed on its way back. The cause of the accident was unknown. A Vietnamese military official who declined to be named said the plane belonged to Vietnam's 918th Air Transport Regiment.

== Cancelled renovations ==
Because of its proximity to the center of Hanoi compared to Noi Bai International Airport, part of Gia Lam Airport was expected to become a civilian airport in the near future, reserved for regional domestic airlines. This would have allowed passengers flying on short-haul flights, such as from Hanoi to Điện Biên, Vinh, or Nà Sản Airport in the northern province of Sơn La, to depart from Gia Lam airport, only 10 minutes away from the centre of Hanoi, rather than Noi Bai, which is located about an hour's drive away from the city.

Gia Lam's 2000m by 45m runway is suitable for small, short-haul aircraft such as ATR 72 twin-turboprops or Fokker 70 jets, which are already operated by Vietnam Airlines as part of their fleet. Under the development plan, the parking yard will be upgraded to receive three ATR 72 or Fokker 70 aircraft by 2015, increasing to five by 2025. Its annual capacity was projected to be 162,000 passengers in 2015, increasing further to 300,000 passengers by 2025. The airport is about the same size as Nà Sản and Điện Biên airports, and will not be able to receive larger Airbus or Boeing aircraft, which will continue to be received at Noi Bai.

The renovations, which would have allowed the airport to meet the standards of the International Civil Aviation Organization, were estimated to cost VND 287 billion (US$17.3 million). These included: building a new parking yard covering 13,720 square metres (3.39 acres) in 2015 and 20,750 square metres (5.13 acres) by 2025; building the new terminal, which was expected to serve 270 passengers an hour during peak hours; and other adjustments such as the expansion of Nguyen Son road, which is the main route into the airport from the city. The renovated airport would've been managed by the Northern Airport Administration.

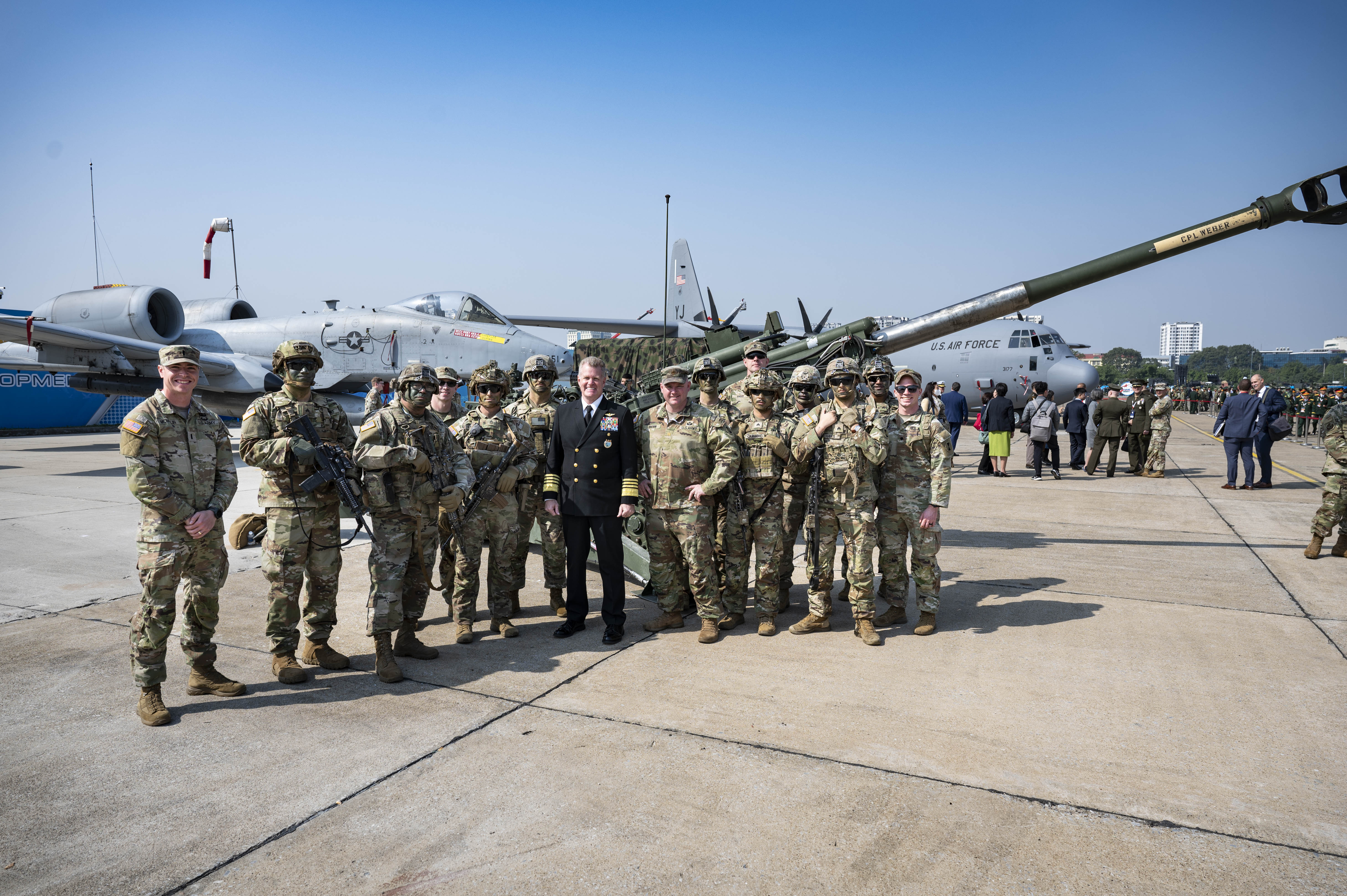
Admiral Samuel J. Paparo, Commander, Indo-Pacific Command, and United States Army personnel at Gia Lam for the 2024 Vietnam Defence Expo.

On February 23, 2018, the Prime Minister issued Decision No. 236/QĐ-TTg on adjusting the air transport development plan up to 2020, in which Gia Lam Airport was not part of the national airport network system. On April 3, 2023, Decision No. 980/QĐ-BGTVT formally abolished the airport master plan and renovation work stopped indefinitely. The airport would continue to host military flights.

In 2020, Vietnamese authorities reaffirmed to leave Gia Lâm outside of the commercial aviation network, effectively abandoned any renovating proposals to support civilian operations. The airport remains under the sole authority of Vietnam Air Defence - Air Force, mainly hosting the Vietnamese Air Force's airlifting operations and serving as ground to host events like Vietnam Defence Expo. In the 2024 Vietnam Defence Expo, the Pacific Air Forces sent a number of Fairchild Republic A-10 Thunderbolt II and Lockheed Martin C-130J Super Hercules carrying combat vehicles to the airport, marking first United States Air Force's comeback to Gia Lam since the Vietnam War.
