= Vietnam Railways SE1/2 train =

SE1/2 is a Reunification Express train in Vietnam, that runs between Hanoi and Saigon, branded train under Vietnam Railways Hanoi.

SE1/2 runs through the north–south railway for 1,726 kilometres (1,072 miles), with the journey from Hanoi to Saigon running for 31 hours and 25 minutes under the train number SE1, and the Saigon to Hanoi running for 31 hours and 35 minutes under the train number SE2.

== Schedule ==
- Timetable from 25 May 2019：

SE1				Stops	SE2			
Distance	Day	Arrival	Departure	Stops	Arrival	Departure	Day	Distance
0	Day 1		22:20	Hanoi	05:30	—	Day 3	1726
56	Day 1	23:22	23:25	Phủ Lý	04:23	04:26	Day 3	1670
87	Day 1	23:56	23:59	Nam Định	03:49	03:52	Day 3	1639
115	Day 2	↓	↓	Ninh Bình	03:17	03:20	Day 3	1611
175	Day 2	01:25	01:31	Thanh Hóa	02:14	02:17	Day 3	1551
319	Day 2	03:42	03:56	Vinh	23:25	23:42	Day 2	1407
340	Day 2	04:19	04:22	Yên Trung	↑	↑	Day 2	1386
387	Day 2	05:16	05:19	Hương Phố	22:16	22:19	Day 2	1339
436	Day 2	↓	↓	Đồng Lê	21:13	21:16	Day 2	1290
522	Day 2	07:52	08:04	Đồng Hới	19:20	19:40	Day 2	1204
622	Day 2	09:39	09:42	Đông Hà	17:38	17:41	Day 2	1104
688	Day 2	10:52	10:59	Huế	16:19	16:26	Day 2	1038
791	Day 2	13:25	13:45	Đà Nẵng	13:35	13:55	Day 2	935
865	Day 2	14:53	14:56	Tam Kỳ	12:24	12:27	Day 2	861
928	Day 2	15:56	16:01	Quảng Ngãi	11:17	11:22	Day 2	798
1096	Day 2	18:36	16:51	Diêu Trì	08:27	08:39	Day 2	630
1198	Day 2	20:26	20:29	Tuy Hòa	06:48	06:51	Day 2	528
1315	Day 2	22:19	22:26	Nha Trang	04:47	04:54	Day 2	411
1408	Day 2	↓	↓	Tháp Chàm	03:16	03:19	Day 2	318
1551	Day 3	02:32	02:37	Bình Thuận	01:05	01:10	Day 2	175
1697	Day 3	05:04	05:07	Biên Hòa	22:31	22:34	Day 1	29
1726	Day 3	05:45	—	Sai Gon		21:55	Day 1	0
