= Tân Ấp station =

Railway station in Vietnam

Tân Ấp Ga Tân Ấp

General information
- Location: Tân Ấp; Quảng Bình Province; Vietnam
- Coordinates: 18°2′1″N 105°51′15″E
- Owner: Vietnam Railways
- Operator: Vietnam Railways
- Platforms: 1
- Tracks: 2

Construction
- Structure type: Ground

Services
Preceding station	Vietnam Railways	Following station
Đồng Hới towards Hanoi	North–South	Vinh towards Saigon
Location

Tân Ấp station is a railway station on the North–South railway (Reunification Express) line in Vietnam. It serves the town of Tân Ấp in Quảng Bình Province. From 1933, the station also served as a terminus of the Tân Ấp–Xóm Cục railway, the only stretch of railway opened as part of the aborted Thakhek–Tân Ấp railway.

It is uncertain when this stretch of railway was closed, but part, if not all of the railway was reopened by North Vietnam in the 1960s as part of their efforts to aid Vietcong guerillas travelling southwards along the Hồ Chí Minh trail, which begins just south of Xóm Cục in the Mụ Giạ Pass.
