= Tháp Chàm station =

Railway station in Vietnam

Tháp Chàm
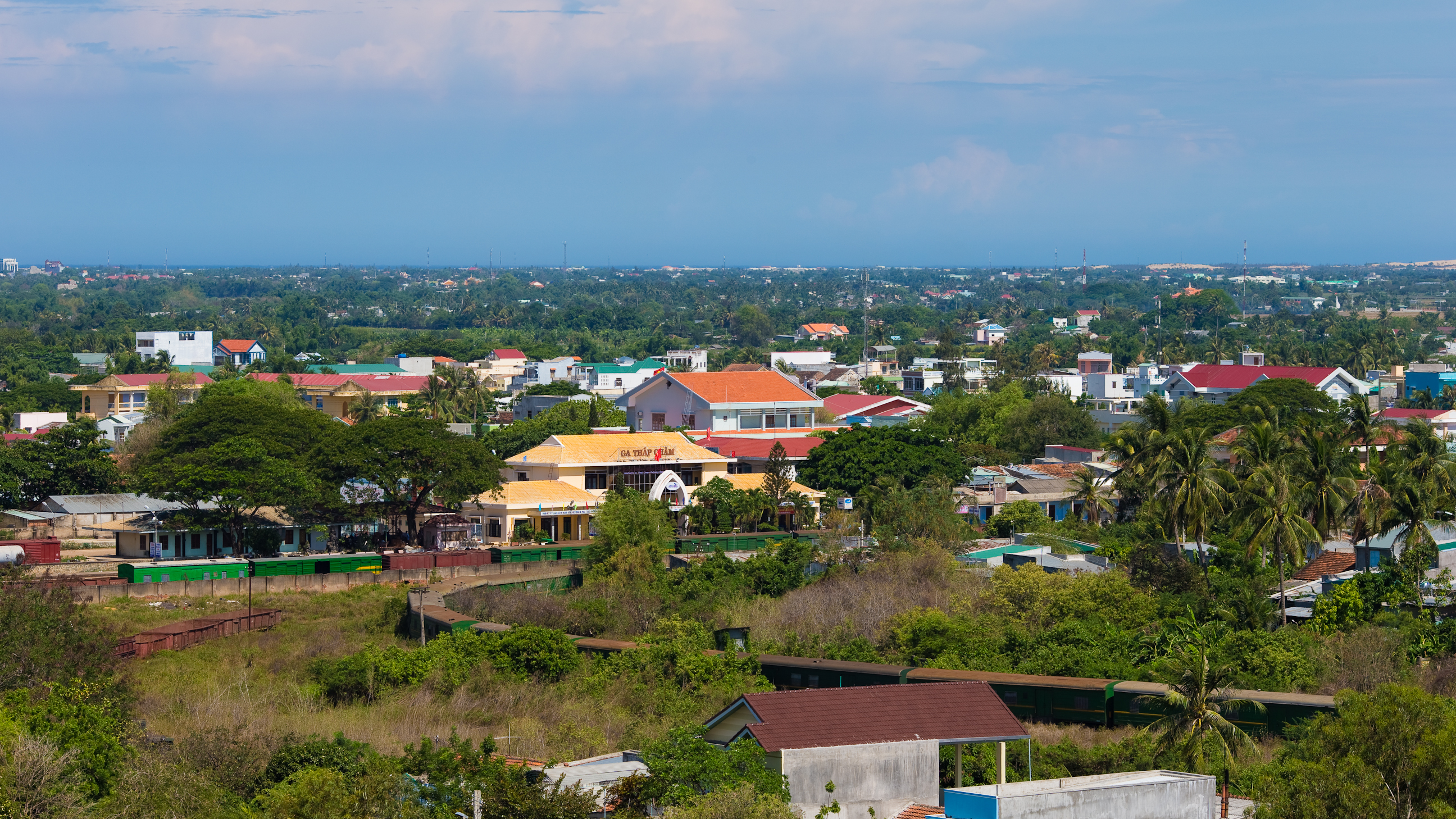

General information
- Location: Phan Rang–Tháp Chàm, Ninh Thuận Province; Vietnam
- Coordinates: 11°35′50″N 108°57′00″E
- Owner: Vietnam Railways
- Operator: Vietnam Railways
- Platforms: 2
- Tracks: 4

Construction
- Structure type: Ground

Services
Preceding station	Vietnam Railways	Following station
Bình Thuận towards Hanoi	North–South	Nha Trang towards Saigon
Terminus	Thap Cham–Da Lat	Tân Mỹ towards Đà Lạt
Location

Tháp Chàm station is a railway station on the North–South railway (Reunification Express) line in Vietnam. It serves the city of Phan Rang–Tháp Chàm in Ninh Thuận Province. A branch line to Da Lat once started here.
