= Nha Trang station =

Railway station in Nha Trang, Vietnam

Coordinates: 12°14′54″N 109°11′03″E

Nha Trang railway station Ga Nha Trang
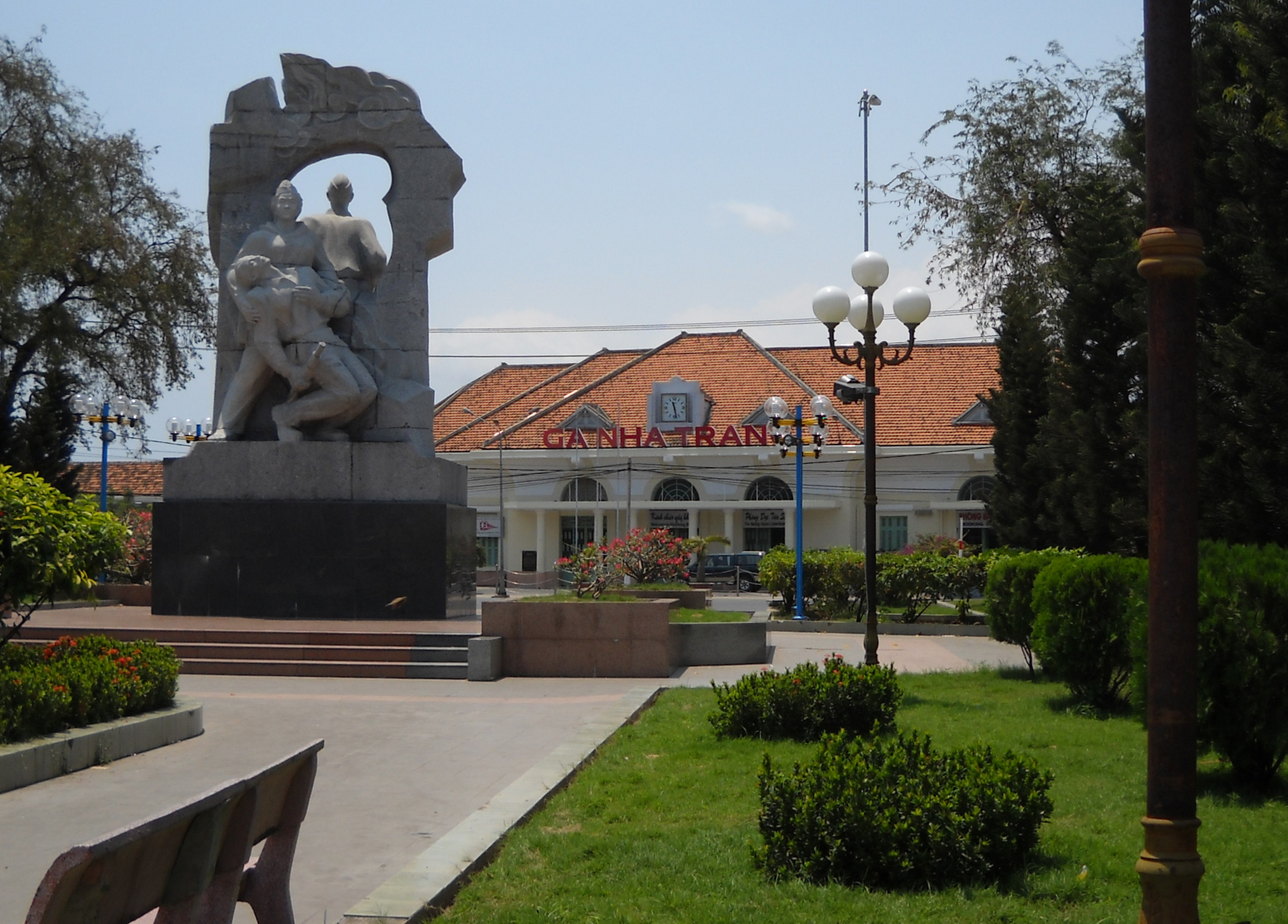
- Nha Trang station from Vo Van Ky park

General information
- Location: 17 Thái Nguyên st., Nha Trang, Khánh Hòa; Vietnam
- System: North-South Railway station
- Owner: Vietnam Railways
- Operator: Vietnam Railways
- Line: North-South Railway
- Platforms: 2
- Tracks: 5

Construction
- Structure type: Concrete
- Parking: Available

History
- Opened: September 2, 1936

Services
Preceding station	Vietnam Railways	Following station
Tháp Chàm towards Hanoi	North–South	Tuy Hòa towards Saigon
Location

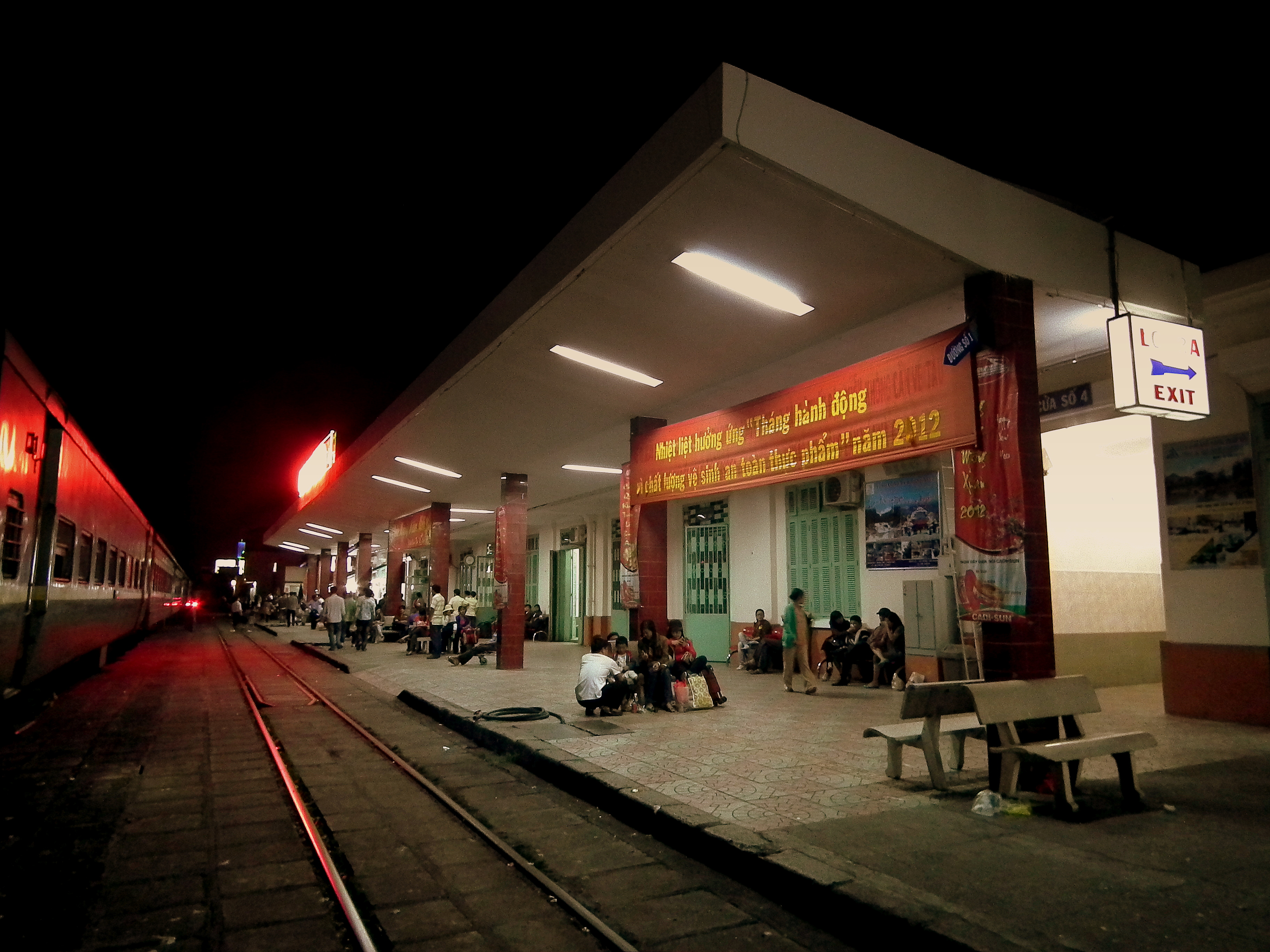
The first platform in Nha Trang station at night

Nha Trang Station is one of the main station on the North–South railway (Reunification railways). This station is located at 17 Thai Nguyen street, Nha Trang ward, Khánh Hòa province. It serves the former city of Nha Trang.

== History ==
The railway between Saigon and Nha Trang was opened in 1913, and the terminal station of Nha Trang was Phu Vinh Station which located 5 km from the city center at that time. The North–South Railway was completed on September 2, 1936, the current Nha Trang Station was built near the center of Nha Trang, and Phu Vinh Station became a freight only station. Phu Binh Station was abolished in 2018.

Nha Trang station is the place that people of Nha Trang start to fight against the French Indochina. Now, Nha Trang station still keeps the French architecture. In front of the station, there is a park named Vo Van Ky park; at the time this station was opened, this park is a large garden of the railway station. There are two same building on the two sides of the station.

== Station relocation ==
Now, this station can be relocate. There are two options to relocate the station:

1. Keep the station as the passenger trains station and build another new freight trains station in the suburbs area.
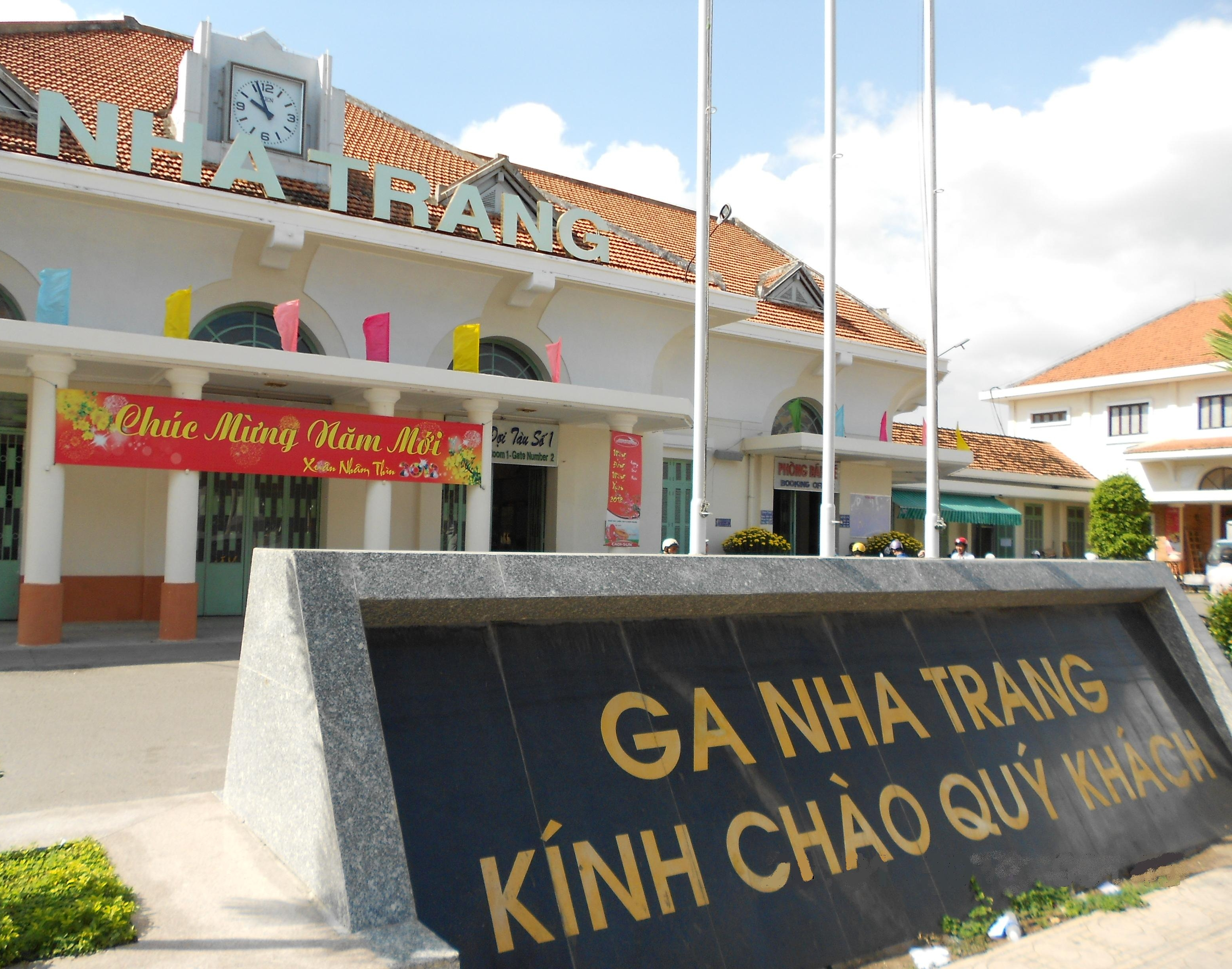
2. Nha Trang Station, building with decoration at Chinese New Year 2012
  Move all of the station to the new railway station in Vĩnh Trung, Nha Trang, Khánh Hòa.
