= Đồng Hới station =

Railway station in Vietnam

Đồng Hới
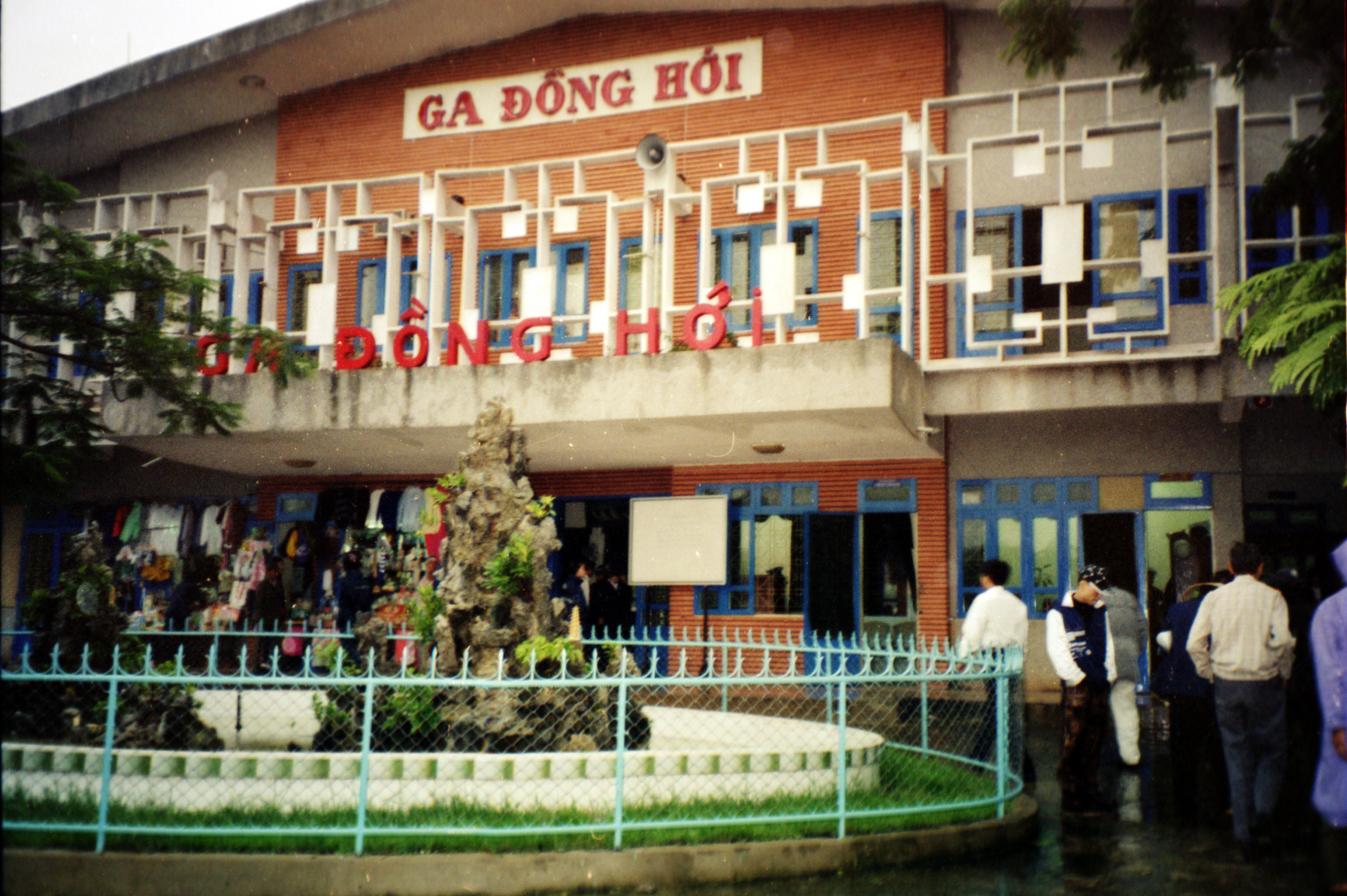

General information
- Location: Hoang Dieu Street, Đồng Hới; Quảng Bình Province; Vietnam
- Coordinates: 17°28′12″N 106°36′0″E
- Owner: Vietnam Railways
- Operator: Vietnam Railways
- Platforms: 2
- Tracks: 8

Construction
- Structure type: Ground

Services
Preceding station	Vietnam Railways	Following station
Tân Ấp towards Hanoi	North–South	Đông Hà towards Saigon
Location

Đồng Hới station is one of the main railway stations on the North–South railway (Reunification Express) in Vietnam. It serves the city of Đồng Hới, the provincial capital of Quảng Trị Province, (formally of Quảng Bình Province). The station is 450 km south of Hanoi, 160 km north of Huế, 1280 km north of Saigon station. The station is located 3 km West, inland, from the coast and downtown.
