= Quy Nhơn station =

Railway station in Vietnam

Quy Nhơn
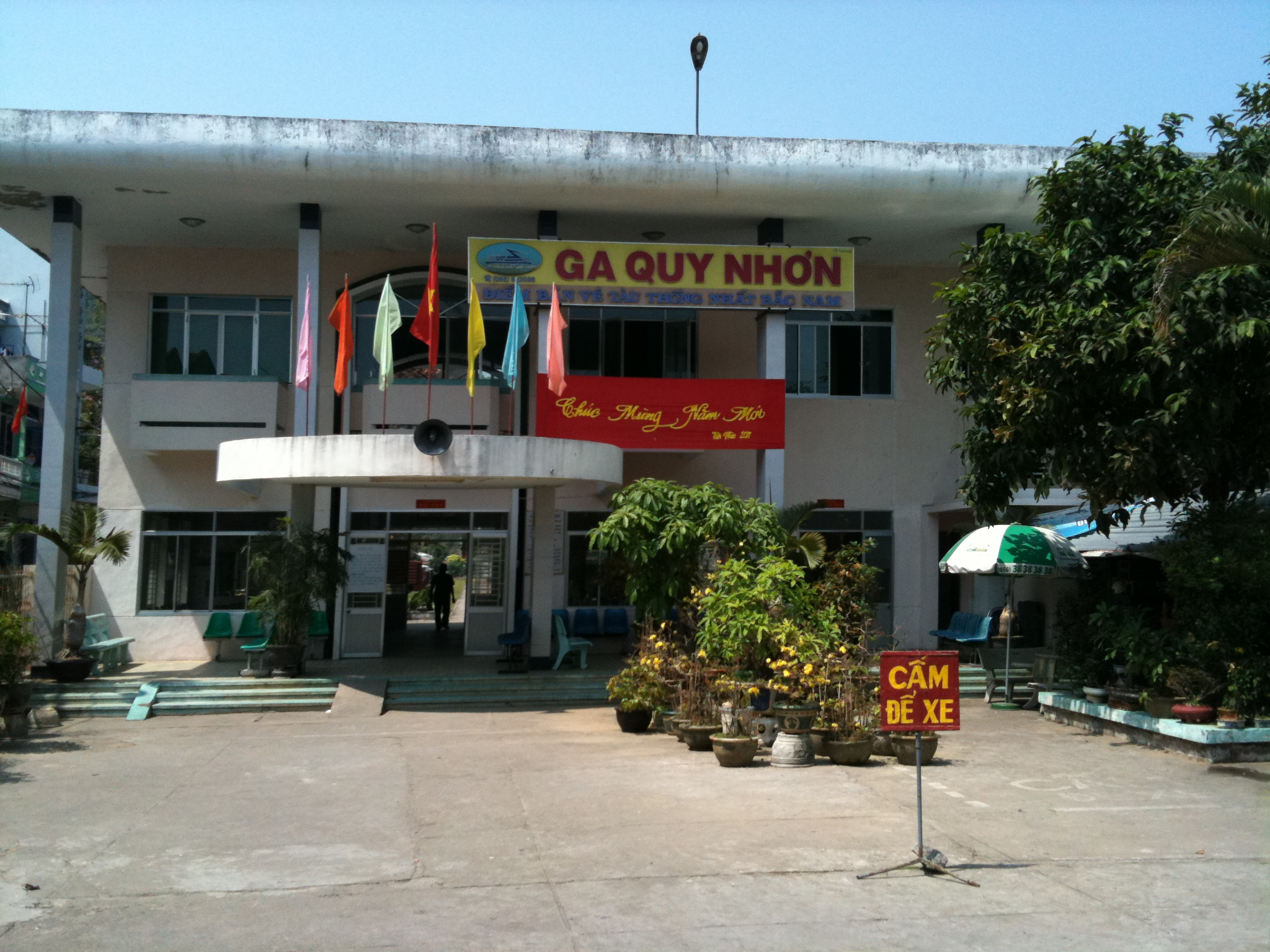

General information
- Location: Vietnam
- Coordinates: 13°46′39″N 109°13′31″E
Location

Quy Nhơn station is a railway station on the North–South railway in Vietnam. It serves the city of Quy Nhon, in Bình Định province.

The city is not very important so the unification express does not stop, it does stop at Diêu Trì railway station nearby. But from Hồ Chí Minh City the SE 35 stops at Quy Nhon.
