= Bình Thuận station =

Railway station in Vietnam

Coordinates: 10°58′07″N 108°00′11″E

Binh Thuan Ga Bình Thuận
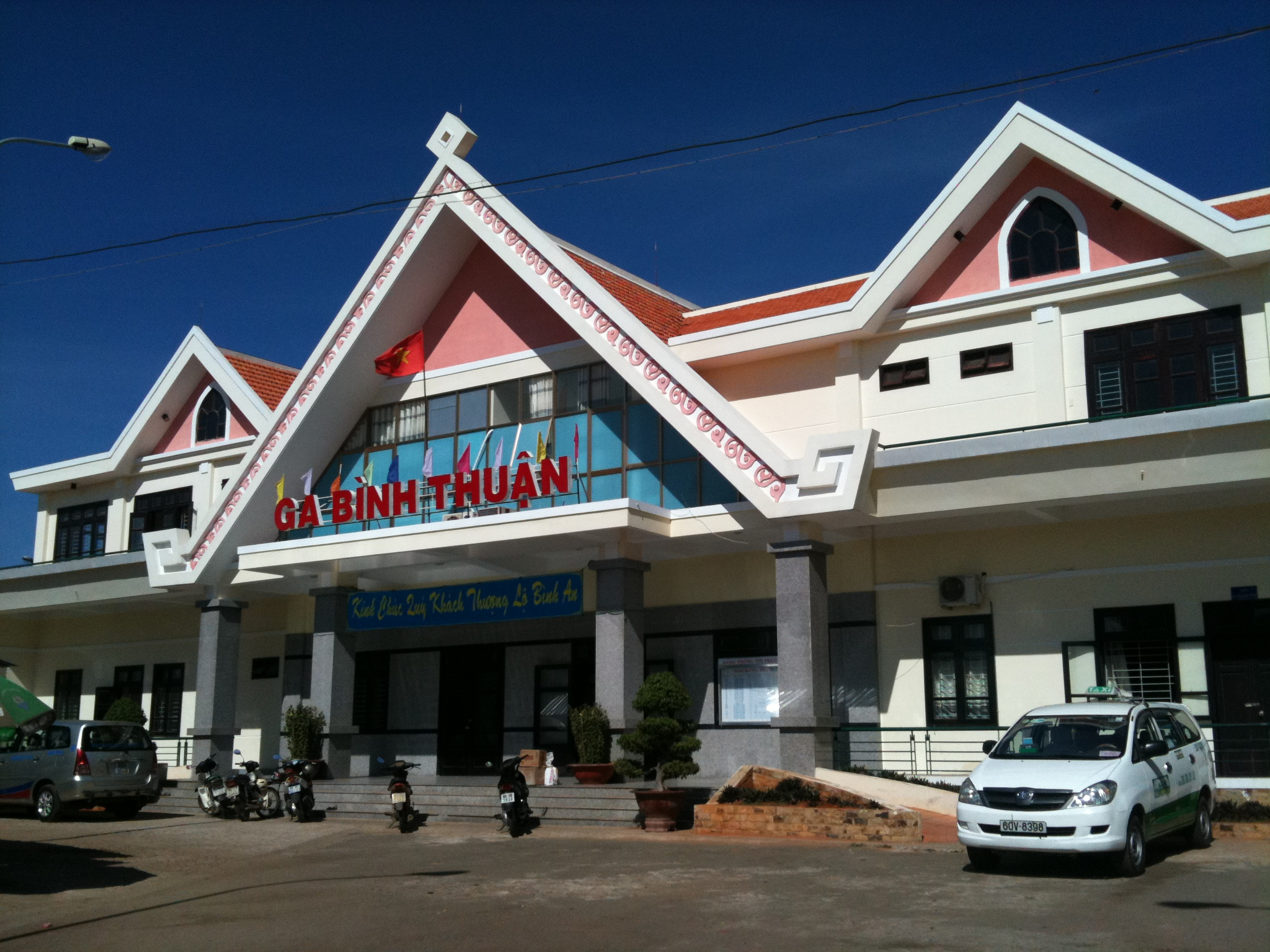

General information
- Location: Hàm Thuận Nam, Bình Thuận Province; Vietnam
- Line: North–South Railway

Services
Preceding station	Vietnam Railways	Following station
Hàm Liêm towards Hanoi	North–South	Hàm Cường Tây towards Saigon
Location

Bình Thuận station (Ga Bình Thuận) is one of the main railway stations on the North–South railway in Vietnam. It serves the city of Phan Thiết. Phan Thiết has its own railway station (Phan Thiet station), but it is not located on the main North–South Railway. The old name of this station is Mương Mán station. Some Reunification Express trains stop only at Mương Mán.
