= Phủ Lý station =

Railway station in Vietnam

Phủ Lý
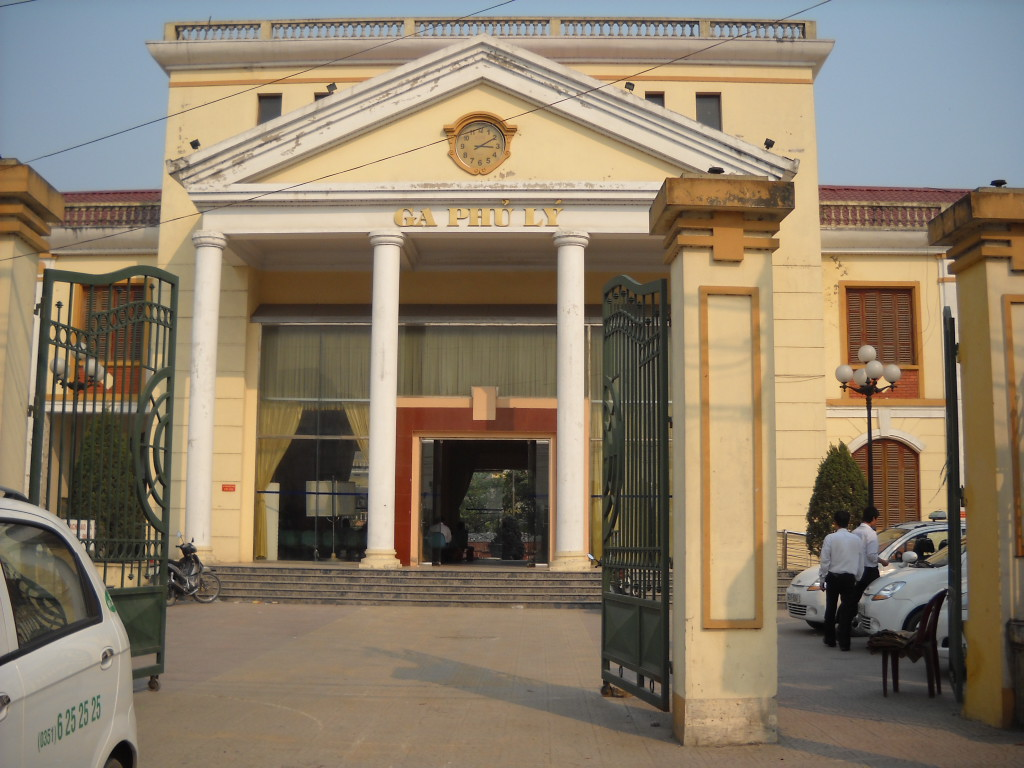

General information
- Location: Vietnam
- Coordinates: 20°32′26″N 105°54′47″E
Location

Phủ Lý station is one of the main railway stations on the North–South railway (Reunification Express) in Vietnam. It serves the city of Phủ Lý, Hà Nam province.

It serves daily train services to the capital, Hà Nội, as well as to the south, up to Ho Chi Minh City (Sài Gòn). Going northbound, it is usually the last station before Hà Nội. The previous station is usually Năm Định.
