= Giáp Bát station =

Railway station in Hoàng Mai, Vietnam

Giáp Bát
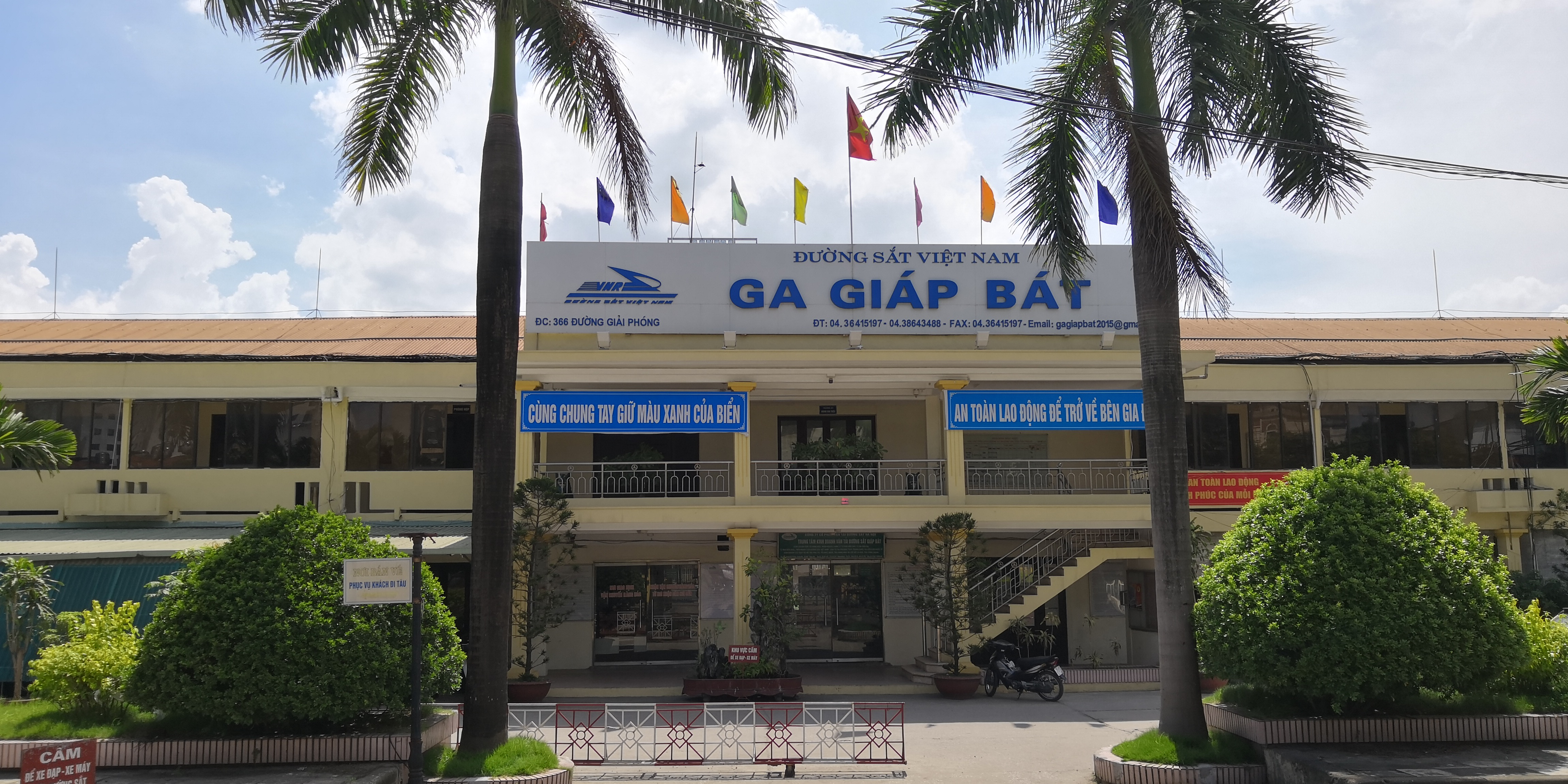

General information
- Location: 366 Giai Phong Street, Dinh Cong Ward, Hoang Mai District, Hanoi; Vietnam
- Coordinates: 20°58′43″N 105°50′25″E
Location

Giáp Bát station is a railway station on the North–South railway (Reunification Express) in Vietnam. It serves the city of Hanoi.
