= Ninh Bình station =

Railway station in Ninh Bình, Vietnam

Ninh Bình Ga Ninh Bình
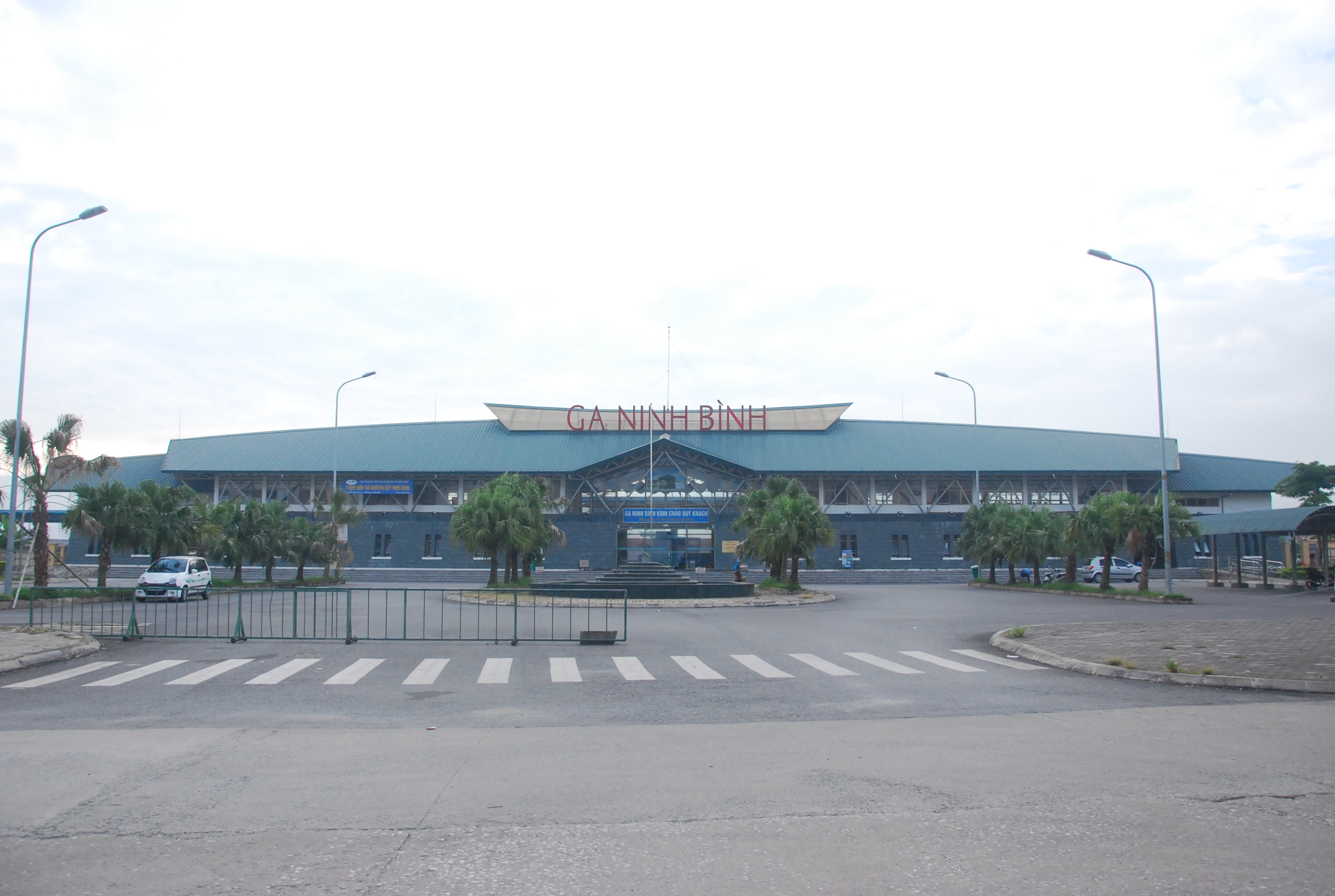
- The new Ninh Bình station

General information
- Location: Vietnam
- Coordinates: 20°14′31″N 105°58′30″E
- Line: North - South Railway
- Platforms: 2
- Tracks: 11

History
- Rebuilt: 2015
Location

Ninh Bình station is a railway station in the center of Hoa Lư, Ninh Bình Province, Vietnam. It lies on the North–South railway. In 2015, VTC commented that Ninh Bình station was the most beautiful and modern railway station in Vietnam.

== History ==
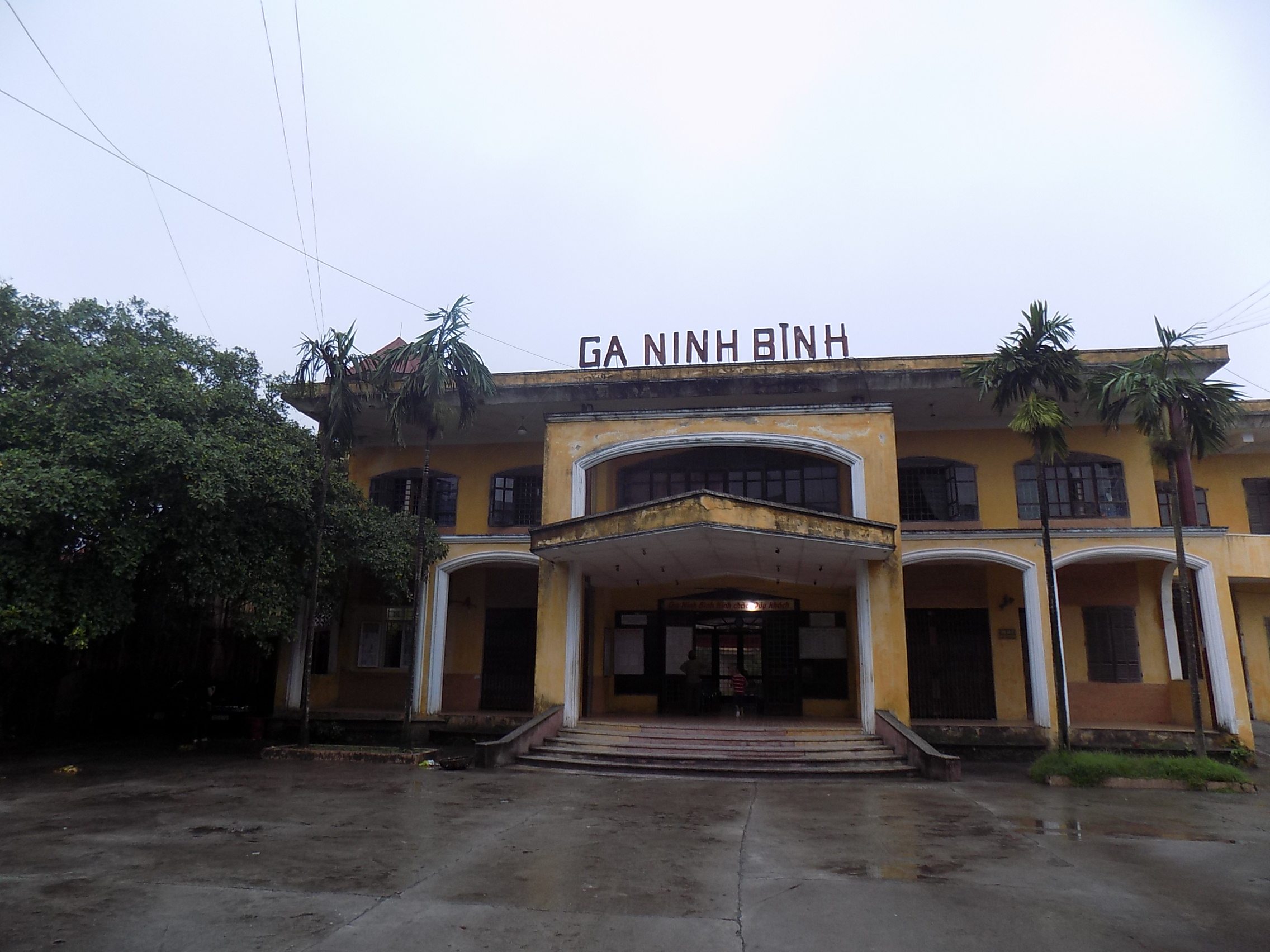
The old Ninh Bình station

The old station was built near Ninh Bình bridge and Đáy River. In the past, it accommodated passenger and freight trains. In the First Indochina War, the station was closed. Despite the fierce bombing, many trains still operated in order to carry soldiers, food and weapons to fight against the French.

A new station opened in June 2015 to replace the old one.

== Site ==
The new station is 1.35 km (0.84 mi) from the old station. The station was upgraded from 4 to 11 tracks to serve more passengers, freight trains and to allow repairs.
