= Diêu Trì station =

Railway station in Vietnam

Diêu Trì Ga Diêu Trì
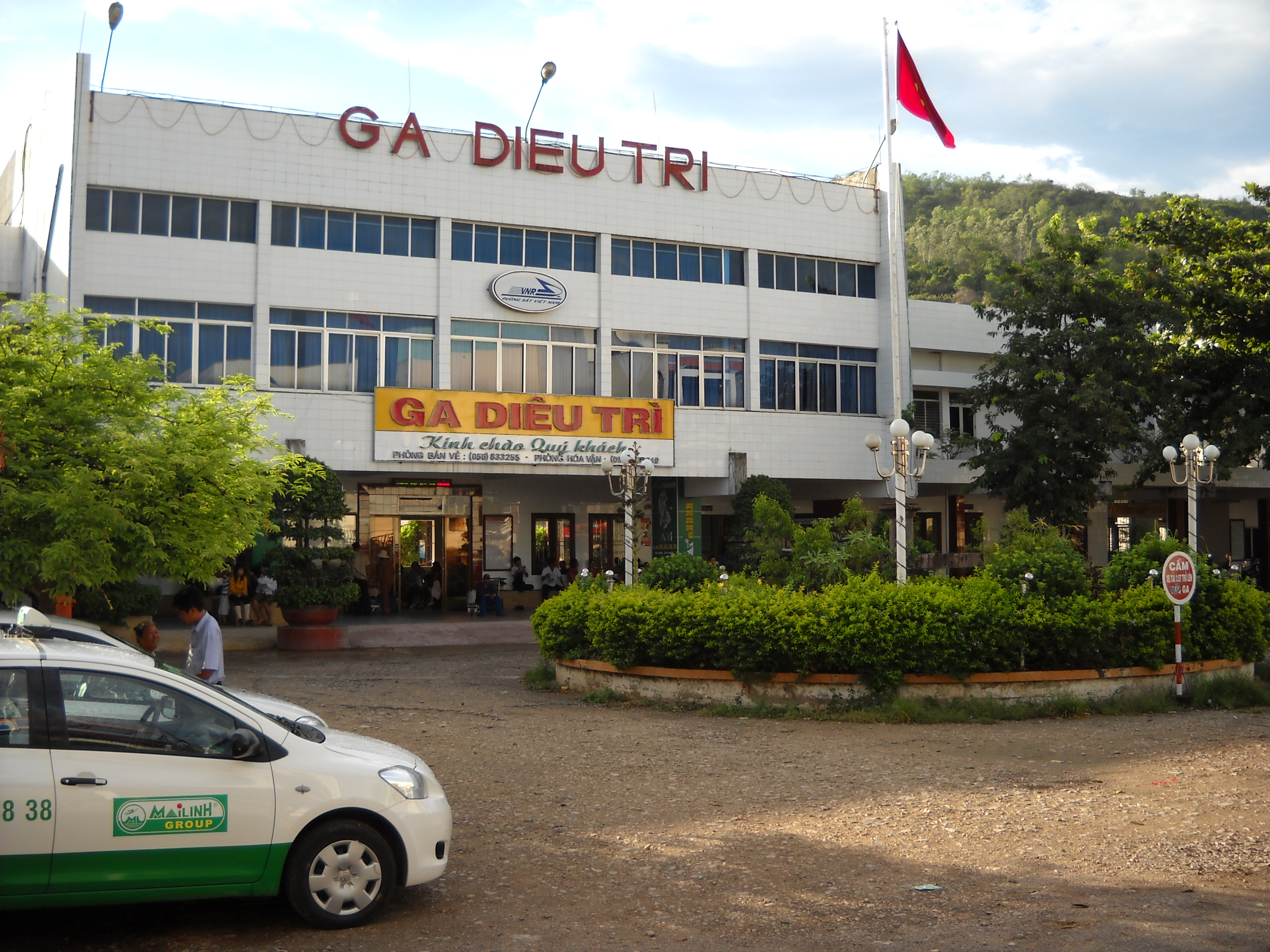

General information
- Location: Vietnam
- Coordinates: 13°48′26″N 109°08′37″E
- Owner: Vietnam Railways
Location

Diêu Trì station is one of the main railway stations on the North–South railway (Reunification Express) in Vietnam. It serves the town of Diêu Trì and connects by a branch line to Quy Nhon Railway Station and the city of Quy Nhon, ten kilometres to the east.
