= Vinh station =

Railway station in Minh, Vietnam

Vinh
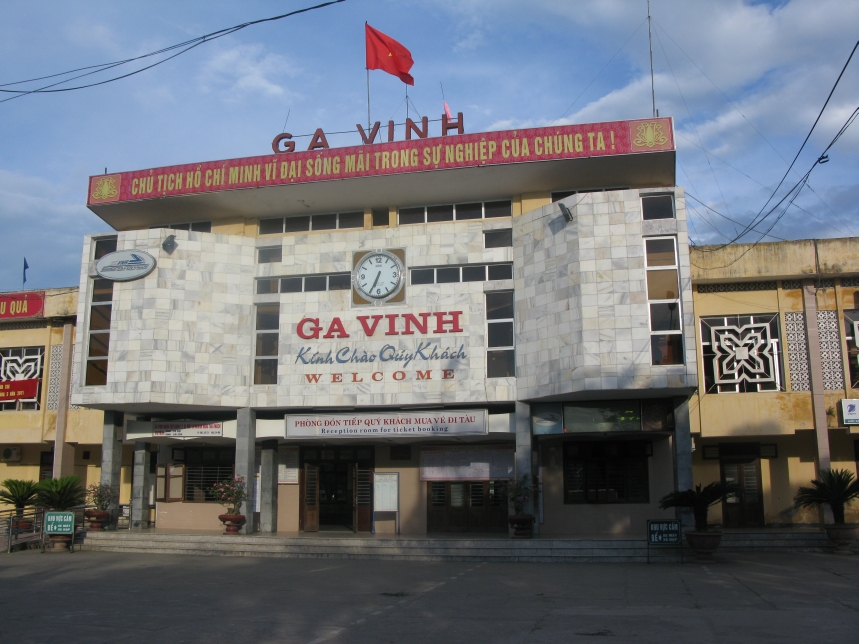

General information
- Location: Vietnam
- Coordinates: 18°41′18″N 105°39′52″E
Location

Vinh station is one of the main railway stations on the North–South railway (Reunification Express) in Vietnam. It serves the city of Vinh.
