= North–South railway (Vietnam) =

Trunk railway line in Vietnam

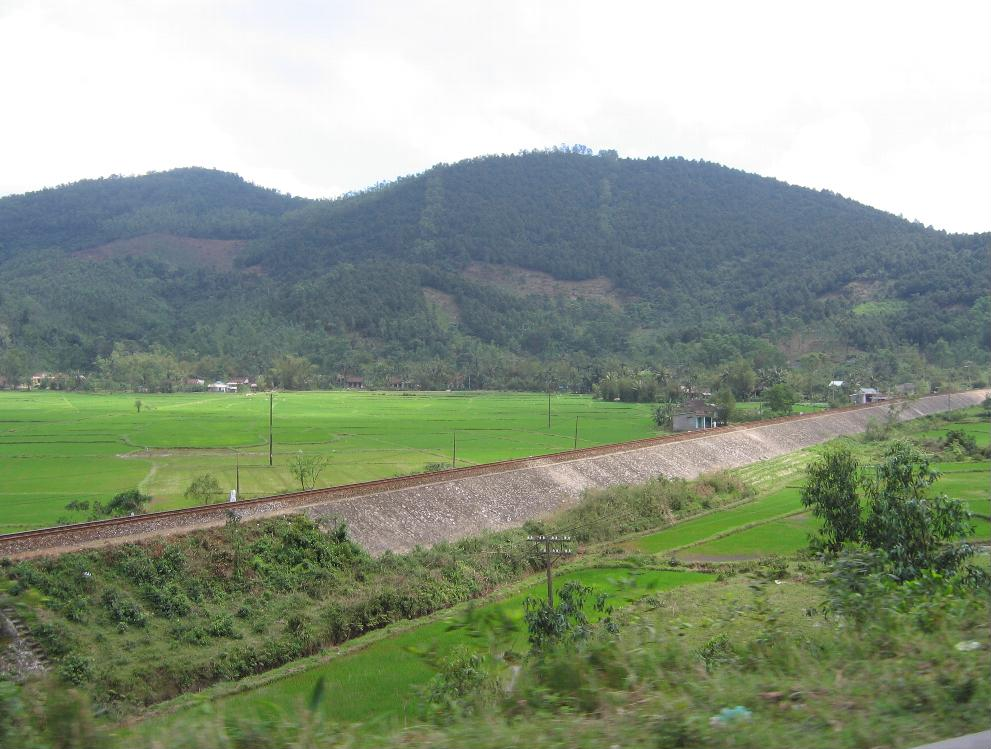
- The North–South railway line through Quang Nam

Overview
- Status: Operational
- Owner: Vietnam Railways
- Locale: Vietnam
- Termini: Hà Nội; Sài Gòn
- Stations: 175
- Website: https://dsvn.vn/

Service
- Type: Inter-city rail; Regional rail; Freight rail
- System: Vietnam Railways
- Services: 16 trains per day (80-85 trains per day for holidays, Tết)
- Route number: ĐSBN
- Operator: Vietnam Railways
- Depot(s): Hà Nội; Vinh; Đồng Hới; Đà Nẵng; Diêu Trì; Nha Trang; Bình Thuận; Sài Gòn
- Rolling stock: D9E, D13E, D19E, D20E

History
- Opened: 1936
- Built by: French Colonial Administration

Technical
- Line length: 1,726 km (1,072 mi)
- Num of tracks: Single-track railway
- Character: At-grade
- Track gauge: 1,000 mm (3 ft 3 3/8 in) metre gauge
- Minimum radius: ≥800m/≥400m
- Electrification: No
- Operating speed: 100 km/h (62 mph)
- Signalling: ETCS Level 2
- Maximum incline: ≤6‰/≤9‰

The North–South railway (Vietnamese: Đường sắt Bắc–Nam, Vietnamese pronunciation: [ɗɯə̀ŋ ʂɐ̌t ɓǎk nāːm], French: Chemin de fer Nord-Sud) is the principal railway line serving the country of Vietnam. It is a single-track metre gauge line connecting the capital Hanoi in the north to Ho Chi Minh City in the south, for a total length of 1,726 km (1,072 mi). Trains travelling this line are sometimes referred to as the Reunification Express (Vietnamese: Đường sắt Thống Nhất, referring to the Reunification of Vietnam), although no particular train carries this name officially. The line was established during French colonial rule, and was completed over a period of nearly forty years, from 1899 to 1936. As of 2005, 191 of Vietnam's 278 railway stations were located along the North–South line.

From World War II through to the Vietnam War, the entire North–South railway sustained major damage from bombings and sabotage. Owing to this damage, and to a subsequent lack of capital investment and maintenance, much of the infrastructure along the North–South railway remains outdated or in poor condition; in turn, lack of infrastructure development has been found to be a root cause of railway accidents along the line, including collisions at level crossings and derailments. Recent rehabilitation projects, supported by official development assistance, have improved the safety and efficiency of the line. As of 2007, 85% of the network's passenger volume and 60% of its cargo volume was transported along the line. The national railway company, Vietnam Railways, owns and operates the line.

In 2024, Lonely Planet named the Reunification Express "one of Southeast Asia’s best-loved railways – and one of the most epic overnight train journeys in the world."

== Overview ==
Huế station in 2026, yellow marks on the platforms warning people not to stay too near to the tracks

For the most part, this 1,726 km (1,072 mi) long metre gauge line follows the coastline of Vietnam, beginning in Hà Nội, passing through the provinces and municipalities of Ninh Bình, Thanh Hóa, Nghệ An, Hà Tĩnh, Quảng Trị, Huế, Đà Nẵng, Quảng Ngãi, Gia Lai, Đắk Lắk, Khánh Hòa, Lâm Đồng and Đồng Nai before coming to an end in Ho Chi Minh City. Trains taking this route pass through a number of areas recognized for their beauty, such as the Hải Vân Pass and Lăng Cô Peninsula near Huế, and Vân Phong Bay near Nha Trang ward. Typical journeys from one end of the line to the other last about 30 hours. Passengers arriving in Hà Nội are able to transfer to several other railway lines, leading to Hải Phòng, Hạ Long Bay, Thái Nguyên, Lào Cai, Lạng Sơn and the People's Republic of China.

As of 2007, 85% of the network's passenger traffic and 60% of its cargo traffic was transported along the North–South line, corresponding to 3,960.6 million person-km and 2,329.5 million ton-km, respectively. (Note: Transport statistics for rail transport in 2007 report a traffic volume of 4,659.5 million person-km for passenger rail traffic and 3,882.5 million ton-km for freight rail traffic. Volume of freight traffic by type of transport, Volume of passengers traffic by type of transport. General Statistics Office of Vietnam.) These proportions are only slightly different from those recorded in the early 1990s; 1993 figures reported 82% of passenger traffic and 66% of cargo traffic along the line.

=== Passenger service ===
Daily passenger service is provided along the entire North–South railway by state railway company Vietnam Railways. Express service links Hanoi and Ho Chi Minh City, making stops at major stations; local service is also provided along shorter portions of the line, such as from Hanoi to Vinh, Vinh to Đồng Hới, Vinh to Quy Nhon, and so on. The following trains run regularly along the line (each line represents a pair of trains, one southbound and the other northbound):

Train	Type	From	To	Length	Notes	
SE1/SE2	Express	Hà Nội	Hồ Chí Minh City	33 hrs	Stops at Nam Định, Thanh Hóa, Vinh, Đồng Hới, Đông Hà, Huế, Lăng Cô, Đà Năng, Tam Kỳ, Quảng Ngãi, Diêu Trì, Tuy Hòa, Nha Trang, Tháp Chàm, Bình Thuận,...	
SE3/SE4	Express	Hà Nội	Hồ Chí Minh City	33 hrs, 40 mins	Stops at Vinh, Đồng Hới, Huế, Đà Nẵng, Diêu Trì, Nha Trang,...	
SE5/SE6	Express	Hà Nội	Hồ Chí Minh City	34 hrs, 25 mins	Stops at Phủ Lý, Nam Định, Ninh Bình, Thanh Hóa, Vinh, Đồng Hới, Huế, Đà Nẵng, Quảng Ngãi, Diêu Trì, Nha Trang, Tháp Chàm, Bình Thuận, Biên Hòa,...	
SE7/SE8	Express	Hà Nội	Hồ Chí Minh City	34 hrs, 40 mins	Stops at Phủ Lý, Nam Định, Ninh Bình, Thanh Hóa, Vinh, Đồng Hới, Huế, Đà Nẵng, Quảng Ngãi, Diêu Trì, Nha Trang, Tháp Chàm, Bình Thuận, Biên Hòa,...	
TN1/TN2 (Now SE9/SE10)	Local	Hà Nội	Hồ Chí Minh City	40 hrs, 50 mins		
TN3/TN4	Local	Hà Nội	Hồ Chí Minh City	40 hrs, 45 mins		
TN5/TN6	Local	Hà Nội	Hồ Chí Minh City	40 hrs, 10 mins		
TN7/TN8	Local	Hà Nội	Hồ Chí Minh City	40 hrs, 25 mins		Out of service
NA1/NA2	Express	Hà Nội	Vinh			
NA3/NA4	Express	Hà Nội	Vinh			
TH1/TH2	Local	Giáp Bát	Thanh Hóa			
VD31/VD32	Local	Vinh	Đồng Hới		Out of service	
DH41/DH42	Local	Đồng Hới	Huế		Out of service	
VQ1/VQ2	Local	Vinh	Quy Nhon			

=== Freight service ===
Vietnam Railways provides daily freight transport, mainly between Hanoi and Ho Chi Minh City; freight service ending at Da Nang is also offered. The following trains run regularly along the line (each line represents a pair of trains, one southbound and the other northbound):

Train	From	To	Notes
GS1/GS2	Giáp Bát (Hà Nội)	Sóng Thần (HCMC)	4-day itinerary
SBN1/SBN2	Giáp Bát (Hà Nội)	Sóng Thần (HCMC)	4-day itinerary
HBN1/HBN2	Giáp Bát (Hà Nội)	Sóng Thần (HCMC)	
HBN3/HBN4	Giáp Bát (Hanoi)	Sóng Thần (HCMC)	
ASY1/ASY2	Giáp Bát (Hanoi)	Sóng Thần (HCMC)	
AH1/AH2	Giáp Bát (Hanoi)	Sóng Thần (HCMC)	
HSD1/HSD2	Da Nang	Ho Chi Minh City	
HSK1/HSK2	Kim Lien (Da Nang)	Sóng Thần (HCMC)	
4 digits number	Giáp Bát (Hanoi)	Sóng Thần (HCMC)	

== History ==
The progressive construction of Vietnam's railway system, 1881–1966.

In 1895, outgoing Governor-General of French Indochina Jean Marie de Lanessan, convinced of the necessity of building railways to connect the different parts of Indochina, urged his successors to give priority to the construction of a north–south railway connecting Hanoi and Saigon, calling it "the backbone of Indochina" from which all other routes would radiate. (Note: "De la voie principale s'étendant ainsi de la frontière de Chine à Saïgon et représentant en quelque sorte l'épine dorsale de l'Indo-Chine, toutes les autres routes ou voies ferrées partent naturellement pour s'enfoncer en toutes directions jusqu'aux limites du pays, les unes pénétrant du côté de la Chine, les autres vers le Mékong, à travers le Laos." (La Colonisation française en Indo-Chine. Jean Marie Antoine de Lanessan. 1895. p.329.)) It was Paul Doumer, appointed as Governor-General in 1897, who put de Lanessan's call into action. Soon after his appointment, Doumer submitted an overarching proposal for railway development in Indochina, including plans for what would eventually become the Yunnan–Vietnam Railway and the North–South railway. The French government approved the construction of the entire Yunnan line and several sections of the North–South line, approving a loan of 200 million francs within the following year. Work began swiftly thereafter, with the Phu Lang Thuong—Lạng Sơn line being upgraded and extended from Hanoi to the Chinese border at Dong Dang by 1902, and the first section of the Yunnan line between Hanoi and Haiphong opening in the same year.

Construction of the first sections of the North–South railway itself began in 1899, and lasted over thirty years, with individual sections completed serially. The first section to be laid down was the Hanoi–Vinh section, built from 1899 to 1905. Next to be built was the Nha Trang–Saigon section from 1905 to 1913; the Saigon–Tan Linh portion was opened in 1908, followed by the Tan Linh–Nha Trang portion in 1913. During this time, tracks were also laid around the city of Huế, leading south to Tourane, and north to Đông Hà. The Huế–Tourane section opened in 1906, and the Huế–Dong Ha line opened in 1908. The Vinh-Huế section was constructed from 1913 to 1927, and finally, the remaining Huế–Nha Trang section was constructed from 1930 to 1936. On 2 October 1936, the entire 1,726 km (1,072 mi) Hanoi–Saigon link was formally put into full operation.

As elsewhere in the world, the railways were the sites of active union and labor organization.

The first journeys from end to end of the newly completed line, dubbed the Transindochinois ("Trans-Indochinese"), generally took about 60 hours, or two days and three nights. This decreased to about 40 hours by the late 1930s, with trains travelling at an average speed of 43 km/h (27 mph). Trains were generally pulled by French Pacific or Mikado locomotives, and included dining cars and sleeping cars (voitures-couchettes).

=== Wartime ===
After the Japanese invasion of French Indochina during World War II, Japanese forces used the Vietnamese railway system extensively, inviting sabotage by the Viet Minh as well as American bombing from the air. Following the exit of the Japanese at the end of the war, efforts were made to repair the seriously damaged North–South line.

Shortly after World War II ended, however, the First Indochina War began, and the Viet Minh's sabotage of the rail system continued, this time against the armies of the French Union. In response, the French began using the armed armoured train La Rafale as both a cargo-carrier and a mobile surveillance unit. In February 1951 the first Rafale was in service on the Saigon-Nha Trang section of the North–South line. Use of the Rafale failed to deter the Viet Minh guerrillas, however, who continued sabotaging the line, making off with its rails under cover of night and creating a 300 km (190 mi) rail network between Ninh Hoa and Da Nang, in a Viet Minh-controlled area. In 1953, the guerrillas attacked La Rafale itself, mining and destroying stone bridges as they passed by. In 1954, following the signature of Geneva Accords, Vietnam was temporarily divided into two parts: the communist North and anti-communist South. The North–South railway was bisected accordingly at Hiền Lương Bridge, a bridge over the Bến Hải River in Quảng Trị Province.

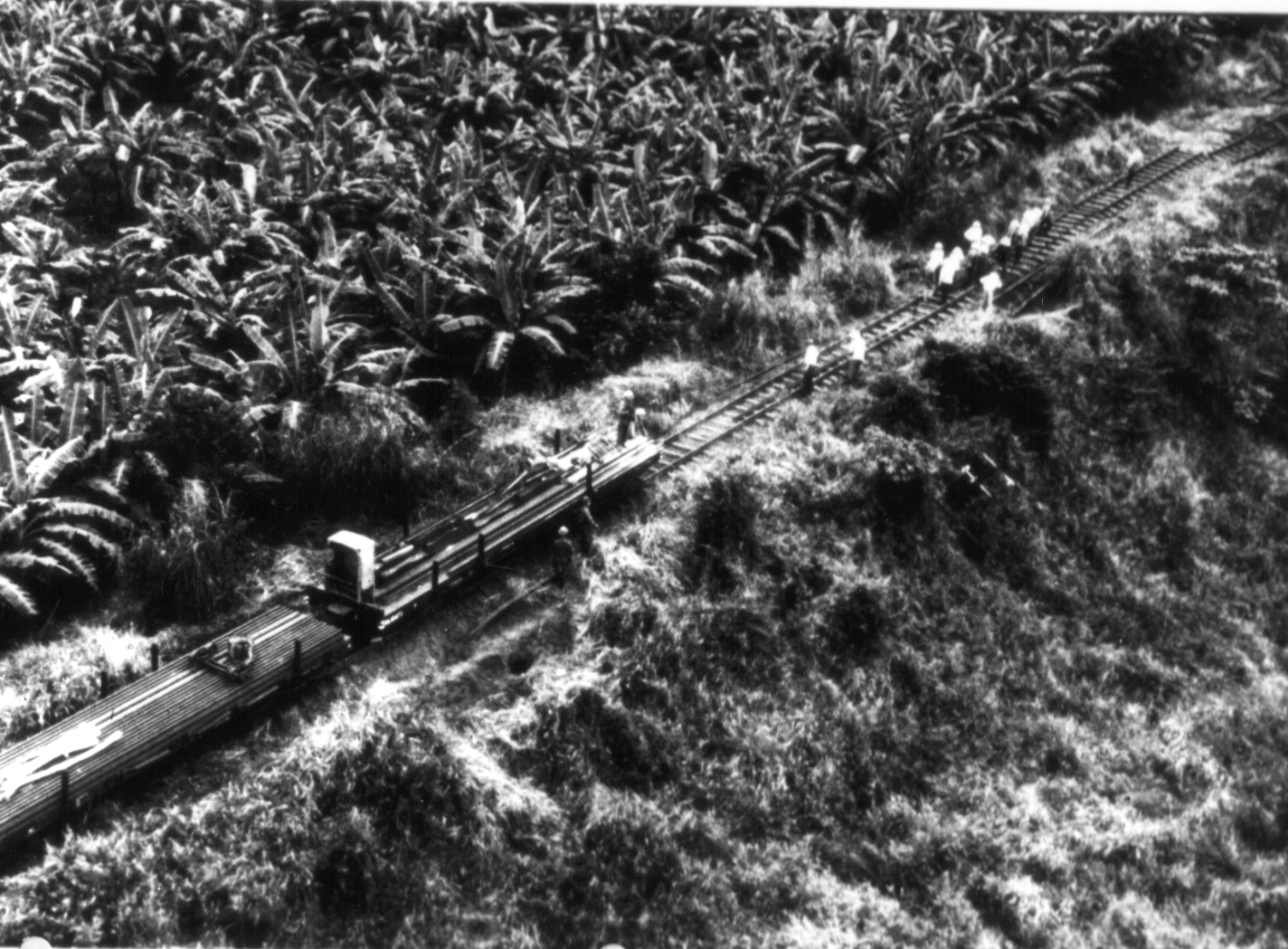
A repair crew installs new railway tracks in South Vietnam.

Throughout the Vietnam War, the North–South railway was a target of bombardments and sabotage by both North Vietnamese and South Vietnamese forces. The South, supported with the United States, reconstructed the track between Saigon and Huế in the late 1950s, a distance of 1,041 km (647 mi). Nevertheless, a relentless campaign of intense bombing and sabotage by the Viet Cong and North Vietnamese regular units resulted in the South Vietnamese railway system being unable to carry significant tonnages. 795 attacks were launched between 1961 and 1964 alone, eventually forcing the South to abandon many large sections of the track. The U.S. Army operating in South Vietnam had considerable interest in the North–South line because of the potential it offered in the bulk movement of cargo at low rates. The system was used to support the Military Assistance Command, Vietnam, construction program and transported hundreds of thousands of tons of rock and gravel to air base and highway sites.

In North Vietnam, American bombing of railways was concentrated on key targets such as railway bridges, both along the North–South railway and along the lines north of Hanoi, such as the Hanoi–Lào Cai and Hanoi–Dong Dang lines. Operation Rolling Thunder was the first large-scale bombing campaign carried out by the U.S. Air Force, taking place from 2 March 1965 until 1 November 1968, when US President Lyndon B. Johnson temporarily called off air raids. Large-scale air raids resumed from 9 May to 23 October 1972, for Operation Linebacker, and again from 18 December to 29 December 1972, for Operation Linebacker II, with fewer target restrictions than Rolling Thunder.

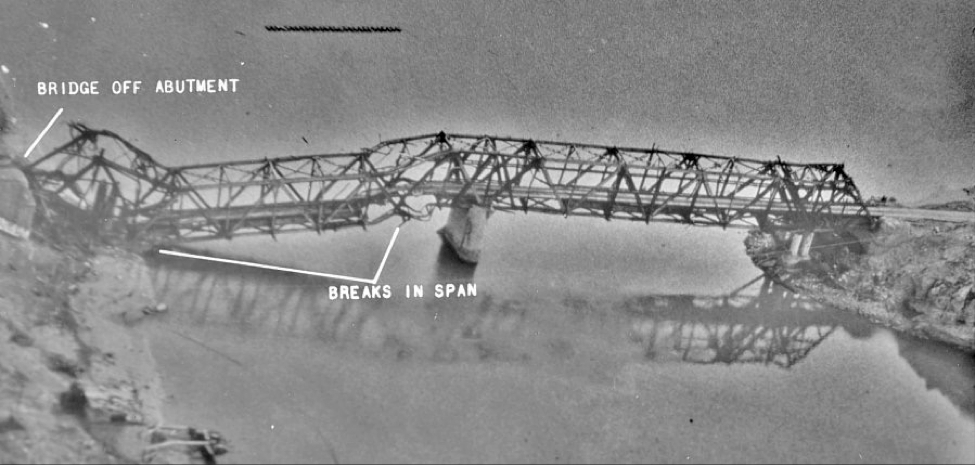
Thanh Hóa Bridge, damaged by smart bombs

A particularly difficult target for the U.S. Air Force was the Thanh Hóa Bridge, a well-defended combined road/rail bridge in Thanh Hóa Province. One of the first attacks on the bridge took place on 3–4 April 1965. Despite dropping 239 tons of bombs on the bridge during the raid, the bridge remained serviceable; additionally, three American F-105 aircraft were shot down during the raid. The U.S. Navy also conducted Alpha strikes on the bridge. Several times, traffic over the bridge was interrupted, but every time, the North Vietnamese dutifully repaired the damage. The bridge was eventually destroyed by laser-guided smart bombs during separate raids on 27 April and 13 May 1972, as part of Operation Linebacker.

After the Fall of Saigon on 30 April 1975, the Communist government of the newly unified Vietnam took control of the former South Vietnamese railway. Heavily damaged, the war-torn North–South railway line was nevertheless restored and returned to service on 31 December 1976, promoted as a symbol of Vietnamese unity. In the short time between the surrender of the South and the reopening of the line, 1334 bridges, 27 tunnels, 158 stations and 1370 switches had been repaired. Other railway lines that once existed, such as the Da Lat–Thap Cham Railway, were dismantled during this period to provide materials for the repair of the main line.

=== Accidents and incidents ===
On 10 March 2015, D19E locomotive No. 968 was written off in an accident near Dien Sanh when it was hauling a passenger train that was in collision with a lorry on a level crossing.

On 7 August 2023, rocks collapsed at km 455 in Quảng Bình province (now is Quảng Trị provice)n a tunnel, leading to massive delays (up to 16 hours 26 minutes). This happened during maintenance of the tunnel.

=== Timeline ===
- 9 January 1903: Hanoi – Ninh Bình
- 20 December 1903: Ninh Bình – Hàm Rồng
- 30 October 1904: Xuân Lộc – Sài Gòn
- 17 March 1905: Hàm Rồng – Vinh
- 25 August 1905: Gia Ray – Xuân Lộc
- 15 December 1906: Huế – Đà Nẵng
- 15 April 1908: Hiền Sỹ – Huế
- 15 June 1908: Mỹ Chánh – Hiền Sỹ
- 5 September 1908: Quảng Trị – Mỹ Chánh
- 10 December 1908: Đông Hà – Quảng Trị
- 15 January 1910: Bình Thuận – Gia Ray
- 16 July 1913: Nha Trang (Phú Vinh) – Bình Thuận
- 10 October 1927: Vinh – Đông Hà
- 17 January 1935: Đà Nẵng – Quảng Ngãi
- 1 July 1935: Quảng Ngãi – Diêu Trì – Quy Nhơn
- 7 January 1936: Diêu Trì – Tuy Hòa
- 1 October 1936: Tuy Hòa – Nha Trang (Phú Vinh)

== Stations ==
=== List of stations ===
This abridged list includes all major stations (Note: For the purpose of this list, major stations are defined as stations at which SE5/SE6-class passenger trains make regular stops lasting two or more minutes. Freight terminals have also been included. See Passenger Transport Business and Vận tải hàng hoá (Cargo transport) (Vietnam Railways), as well as the official Vietnam Railways timetable (Page 1, Page 2, Page 3, Page 4, Page 5 (in Vietnamese)).) with timetabled services. As of 2005, there were 278 stations on the Vietnamese railway network, of which 191 were located along the North–South line.

Km	Station	Region	Province/Municipality	Ward/Commune	Opened	Notes	Photo
0	Hà Nội	Red River Delta	Hà Nội	Văn Miếu – Quốc Tử Giám ward	1902	Interchange for Hà Nội –Hải Phòng, Hà Nội–Thái Nguyên, Hà Nội–Lào Cai, Hà Nội–Đồng Đăng lines	Hanoi Railway Station
5	Giáp Bát	Red River Delta	Hà Nội	Định Công ward		Freight station	
56	Phủ Lý	Red River Delta	Ninh Bình	Phủ Lý ward			Phủ Lý Railway Station
87	Nam Định	Red River Delta	Ninh Bình	Nam Định ward			Photo
115	Ninh Bình	Red River Delta	Ninh Bình	Thanh Bình Ward, Hoa Lư			Ninh Bình Railway Station
176	Thanh Hóa	North Central Coast	Thanh Hóa	Tân Sơn Ward, Thanh Hóa			Thanh Hóa Railway Station
319	Vinh	North Central Coast	Nghệ An	Lê Lợi Ward, Vinh	1905		Vinh Railway Station
522	Đồng Hới	North Central Coast	Quảng Trị	Nam Lý Ward, Đồng Hới			Đồng Hới Railway Station
622	Đông Hà	North Central Coast	Quảng Trị	Đông Hà			
688	Huế	North Central Coast	Huế	Thuận Hóa	1906		Huế Railway Station
777	Kim Liên	South Central Coast	Da Nang	Liên Chiểu District		Freight station	
791	Đà Nẵng	South Central Coast	Da Nang	Thanh Khê District	1902		Đà Nẵng Railway Station
865	Tam Kỳ	South Central Coast	Quảng Nam	An Xuân Ward, Tam Kỳ			Tam Kỳ Railway Station
928	Quảng Ngãi	South Central Coast	Quảng Ngãi	Quảng Phú Ward, Quảng Ngãi			Quảng Ngãi Railway Station
1096	Diêu Trì	South Central Coast	Gia Lai	Tuy Phước commune		For Quy Nhơn	Dieu Tri Railway Station
1096*	Quy Nhơn	South Central Coast	Gia Lai	Quy Nhơn			Quy Nhơn Railway Station
1198	Tuy Hòa	South Central Coast	Đắk Lắk	Ward 2, Tuy Hòa			Tuy Hòa Railway Station
1315	Nha Trang	South Central Coast	Khánh Hòa	Phước Tân, Nha Trang	1936		Nha Trang Railway Station
1408	Tháp Chàm	South Central Coast	Ninh Thuận	Đô Vinh Ward		Interchange for Da Lat–Thap Cham line (Note: Defunct or partially defunct line.)	Thap Cham Railway Station
1551	Bình Thuận	South Central Coast	Bình Thuận	Hàm Kiệm commune		For Phan Thiết. Also known as Mương Mán Station	Bình Thuận Railway Station
1697	Biên Hòa	Southeast	Đồng Nai	Trấn Biên ward			
1706	Dĩ An	Southeast	Hồ Chí Minh City	Dĩ An			Ga_Di_An
1711	Sóng Thần	Southeast	Hồ Chí Minh City	An Bình, Dĩ An		Freight station	Photo
1726	Saigon	Southeast	Hồ Chí Minh City	Nhiêu Lộc ward	1983 (Note: The original Saigon Station, located at Bến Thành Market, was built in 1881. ("120-Year History of Vietnam Railways". Archived from the original on 2011-06-29.) The station currently in use as "Saigon Railway Station", located in Ho Chi Minh City's District 3, was originally known as Hoa Hung Depot, and was used mainly as a freight station; it was converted for use as a passenger station in 1983. ("Ga Sài Gòn" (in Vietnamese). Archived from the original on 2010-05-05.))		Saigon Railway Station

== Infrastructure ==
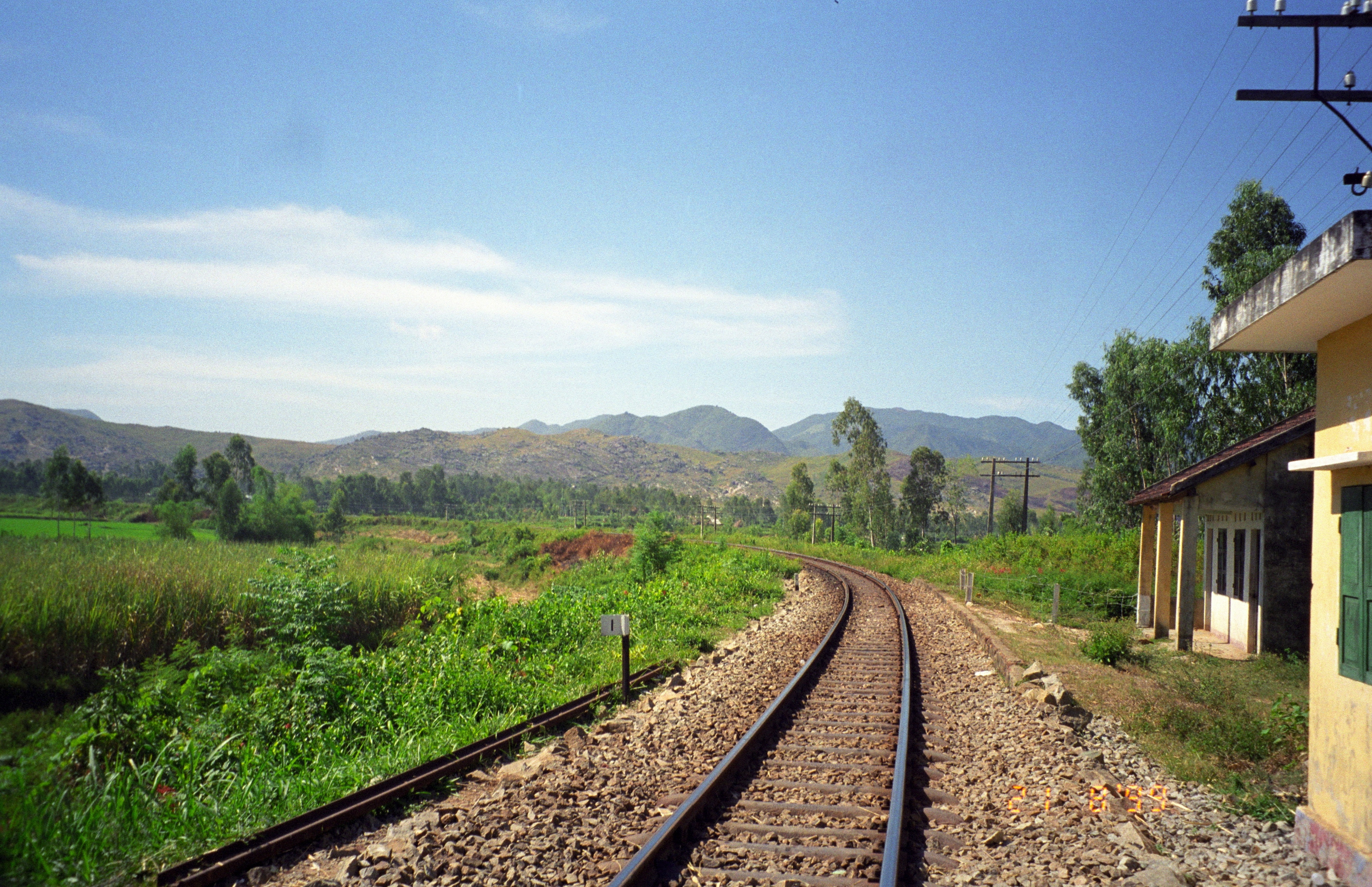
Tracks at a level crossing near Mỹ Sơn

Most of Vietnam's railway infrastructure—including bridges, rail trucks, track beds, rolling stock, signals and communication equipment, and maintenance facilities—has suffered severe deterioration, mainly due to damage inflicted during the Vietnam War and a subsequent lack of capital investment and maintenance. More recently, rehabilitation projects sustained by official development assistance have allowed some of the most critical pieces of infrastructure along the line to be replaced, although much work still remains to be done. Complicating rehabilitation work is seasonal flooding, which, depending on its severity, may cause significant infrastructure damage. For instance, heavy rains falling on Vietnam's north central coast in October 2010 swept away several sections of track in Hà Tĩnh and Quảng Bình provinces; the flooding of many of the nearby provincial roads, which remained several metres underwater, prevented repair crews from reaching the affected sections for weeks.

=== Tracks ===
The North–South railway line uses metre gauge, as was commonly used on local railways in France around the time of its construction.

=== Bridges ===
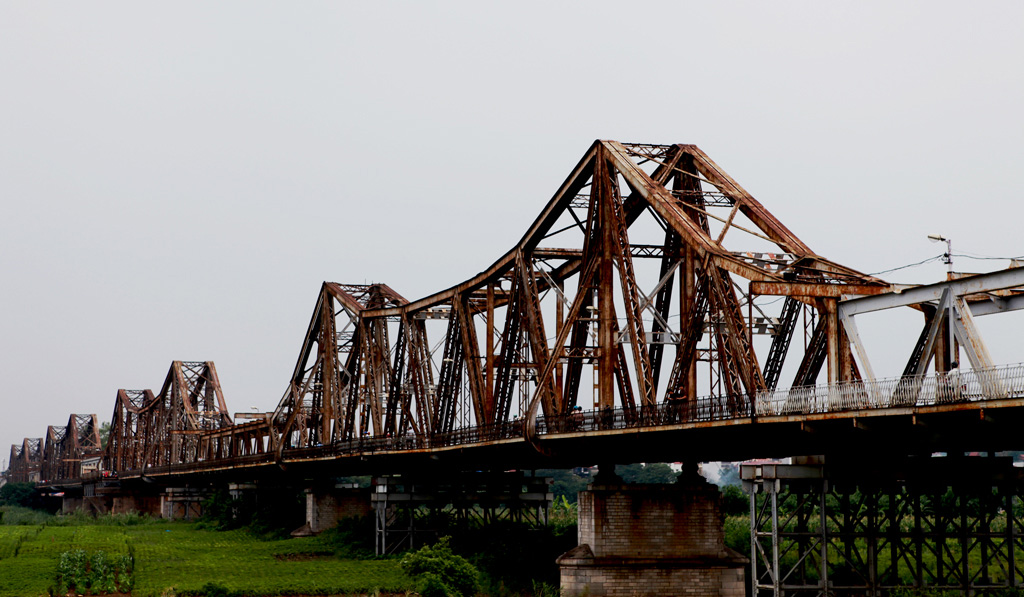
Long Biên Bridge, a famous railway bridge in Vietnam in Hanoi

Vietnam Railways reports the number of railway bridges along the North–South line to be 1,300, totalling about 28,000 m (92,000 ft), or about 63% of the national total. Considering both standard rail bridges and combined bridges, the total length along the North–South line is about 36,000 m (118,000 ft). Many railway bridges are severely worn from age and have damage dating from the Vietnam War, despite temporary restoration following the war. As of 2007, 278 bridges requiring major rehabilitation remain along the North–South Railway line.

=== Tunnels ===
A Vietnam Railways train passes through a tunnel north of Quy Nhơn.

There are 27 railway tunnels along the North–South line, amounting to a total length of 8,335 m (27,346 ft). Certain tunnels are inadequately drained and suffer from deterioration in the tunnel lining, causing water leaks that necessitate reductions in speed.

=== Signalling ===
The North–South railway line uses a semi-automatic block system, which allows individual signals to work either as automatic signals or manual signals. According to a joint Japanese-Vietnamese evaluation team, the recent installation of additional auto-signal systems at key crossings along the line has contributed to a decline in railway accidents.

=== Communications ===
Since 1998, microband Asynchronous Transfer Mode technology has been used along the North–South railway line to send television signals; 64 kbit/s transmission lines are leased from the Vietnam Post and Telecommunications Corporation (VPTC). Along some sections of the line—for example, from Hanoi to Vinh and from Nha Trang to Ho Chi Minh City—a fiber-optic network has been deployed; Vietnam Railways intends to extend the network along the remaining distance from Vinh to Nha Trang. A switching system featuring digital exchanges is in place, connected via the existing transmission system and the public telephone network. As the modernization of the telecommunication system progresses, manual exchanges are gradually being replaced with digital exchanges.

== Safety ==
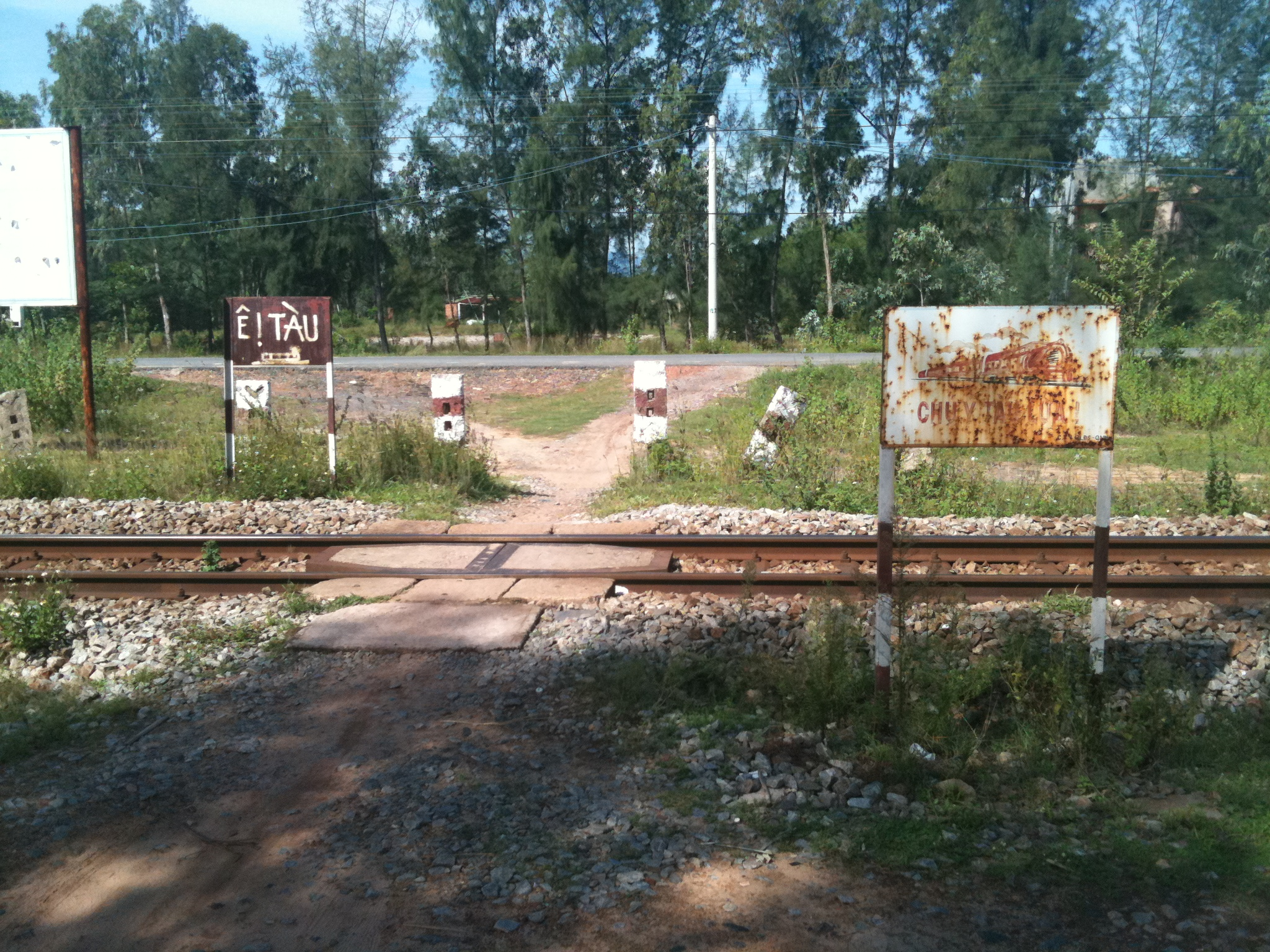
An unprotected level crossing in Da Nang.

Along the North–South railway line, 3,650 level crossings were counted, 3,000 (or 82%) of which had no barriers, alarm systems or guards. As a result, accidents involving vehicles and pedestrians have occurred. A researcher from Villanova University noted "There are numerous safety issues with level crossings...usually, an accident occurs every day." Many rail bridges and tunnels have suffered deterioration since the 1970s, requiring trains passing over or through them to reduce speeds as low as 15 kilometres per hour (9.3 mph). In addition, the center of the country is subject to violent annual flooding and bridges are often swept away, causing lengthy closures.

Along with recent efforts aimed at infrastructure rehabilitation, the recent adoption of safety measures by Vietnam Railways has led to a decline in railway accidents. These measures include: public awareness campaigns on railway safety in the media; construction of fences and safety barriers at critical level crossings in major cities; mobilization of volunteers for traffic control at train stations and level crossings, especially during holiday seasons; the installation of additional auto-signal systems; and the construction of flyovers and underpasses to redirect traffic.

=== Infrastructure rehabilitation ===
The condition of railway infrastructure in Vietnam, although improving, is still poor enough overall to require rehabilitation. Rail transport only became a national priority for the Vietnamese government around the mid-1990s, at which point most of the railway network was severely degraded, having received only temporary repair from damages suffered during decades of war.

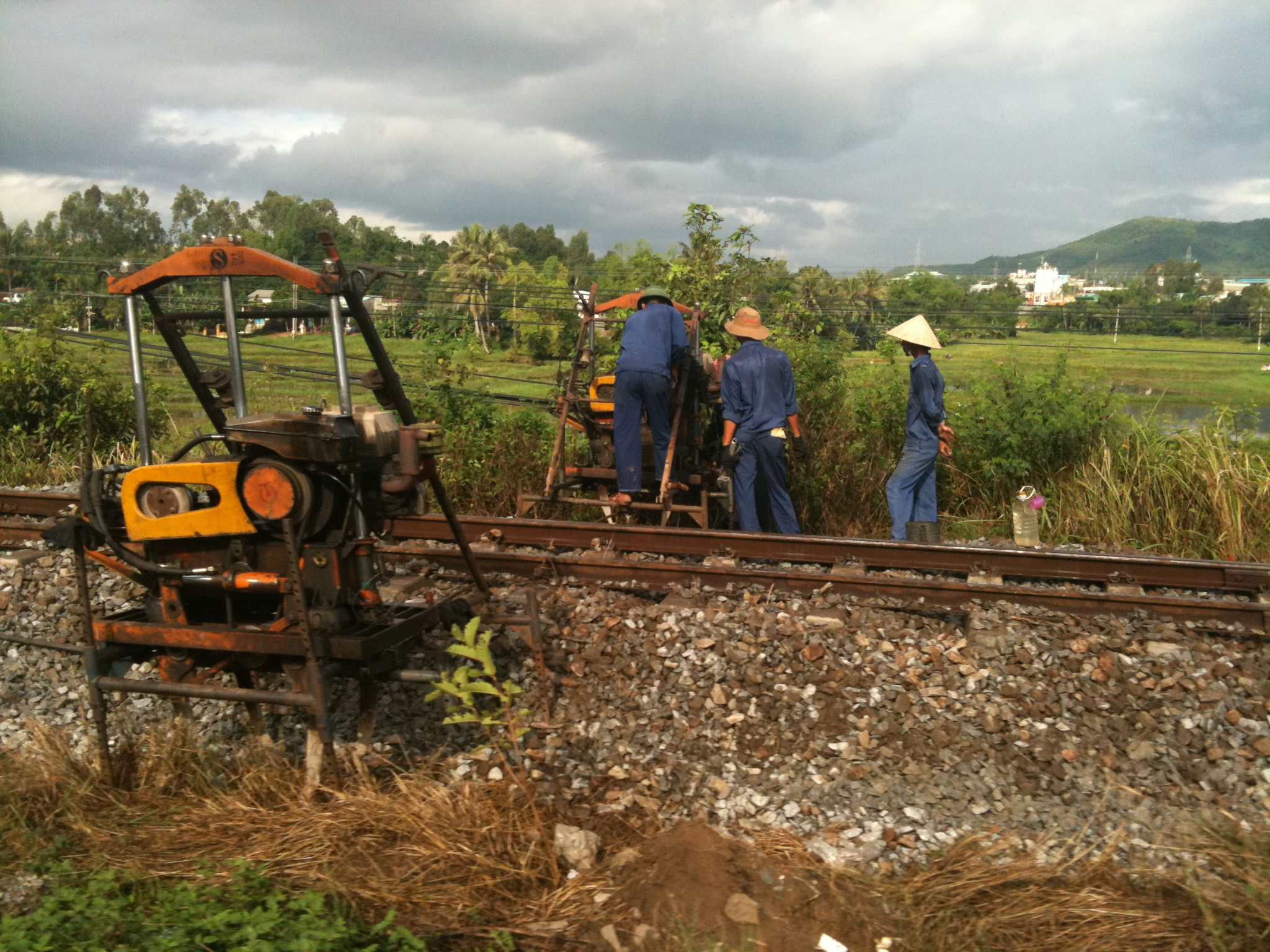
Railroad workers in Da Nang.

From 1994 to 2005, a major bridge rehabilitation project took place on the North–South railway line, with the Pacific Consultants International Group and Japan Transportation Consultants providing consultancy services. The overall project cost was JPY 11,020 million, or 18% less than the budgeted cost. The overall results of the project included a reduction in running hours from one end of the line to the other (from 36 hours in 1994 to 29 hours in 2007); an increase of speed limits on rehabilitated bridges (from 15 to 30 km/h (9.3 to 18.6 mph) to 60 to 80 km/h (37 to 50 mph), which contributed to the reduction in running hours; and a reduction in the number of railway accidents throughout the line.

In 2007, Vietnam Railways awarded an additional VND 150 billion (US$9.5 million) five-year contract for consultancy services to Japan Transportation Consultants, the Pacific Consultants International Group, and the Japan Railway Technical Service (Jarts), regarding a VND 2.47 trillion project to further improve bridge and railway safety on the North–South line. The project's goals include the refurbishment of 44 bridges and 37.6 km (23.4 mi) of railway tracks, the building of two new railway bridges and a new railway station at Ninh Bình, and the purchase of 23 track machines. The project was expected to be completed in 2010.

== Development ==
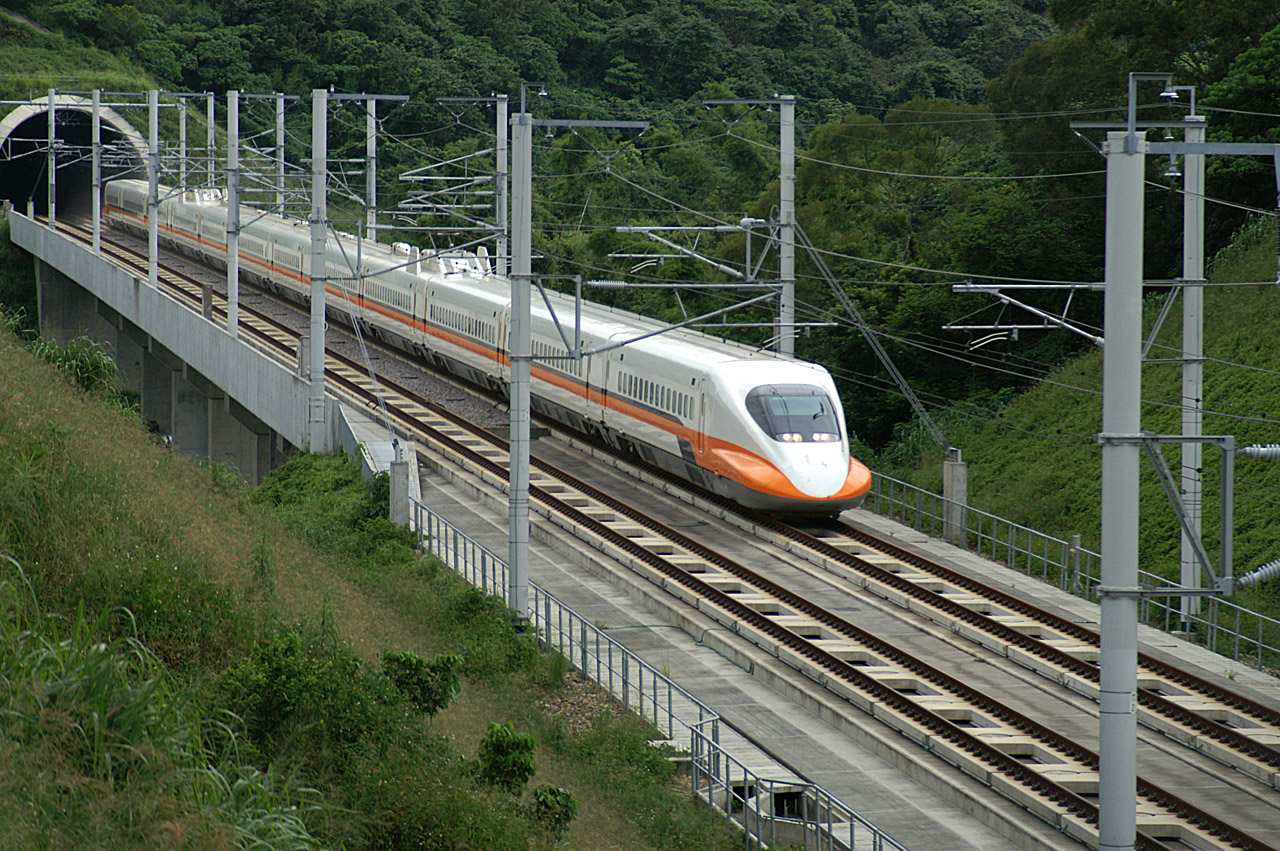
Japanese Shinkansen technology has been suggested for use on the proposed North–South Express Railway. (Photo: Taiwan High Speed Rail)

=== North–South Express Railway ===
National railway company Vietnam Railways has proposed a high-speed rail link between Hanoi and Ho Chi Minh City, capable of running at 300 to 350 km/h (186 to 217 mph). Funding of the $56 billion line would mainly come from the Vietnamese government; reports suggest Japanese development aid could be made available in stages, conditioned on the adoption of Shinkansen technology. Once completed, the high-speed rail line would allow trains to complete the Hanoi-Ho Chi Minh City journey in approximately 6 hours. Vietnam's National Assembly rejected the existing plan for the line in June 2010, and asked for further study of the project. In 2023, the Chinese Government submitted a similar proposal, which would see a new High Speed railway between Ho Chi Minh City & Hanoi, continuing northward into China and linking up to China’s existing high speed rail system in Nanning, allowing for through running of International Chinese rail services and also Vietnam Domestic Rail services. This plan was also rejected by the National Assembly.

But already in 2024, there was an agreement with China to build the North–South railway with Chinese help and a connection to the Chinese rail network. A publication of February 20, 2026 tells of a decision of the National Assembly for an investment equivalent to over 67 billion USD in public-private partnership, and that the new line shall comprise 23 passenger stations and 5 cargo stations.

== Gallery ==
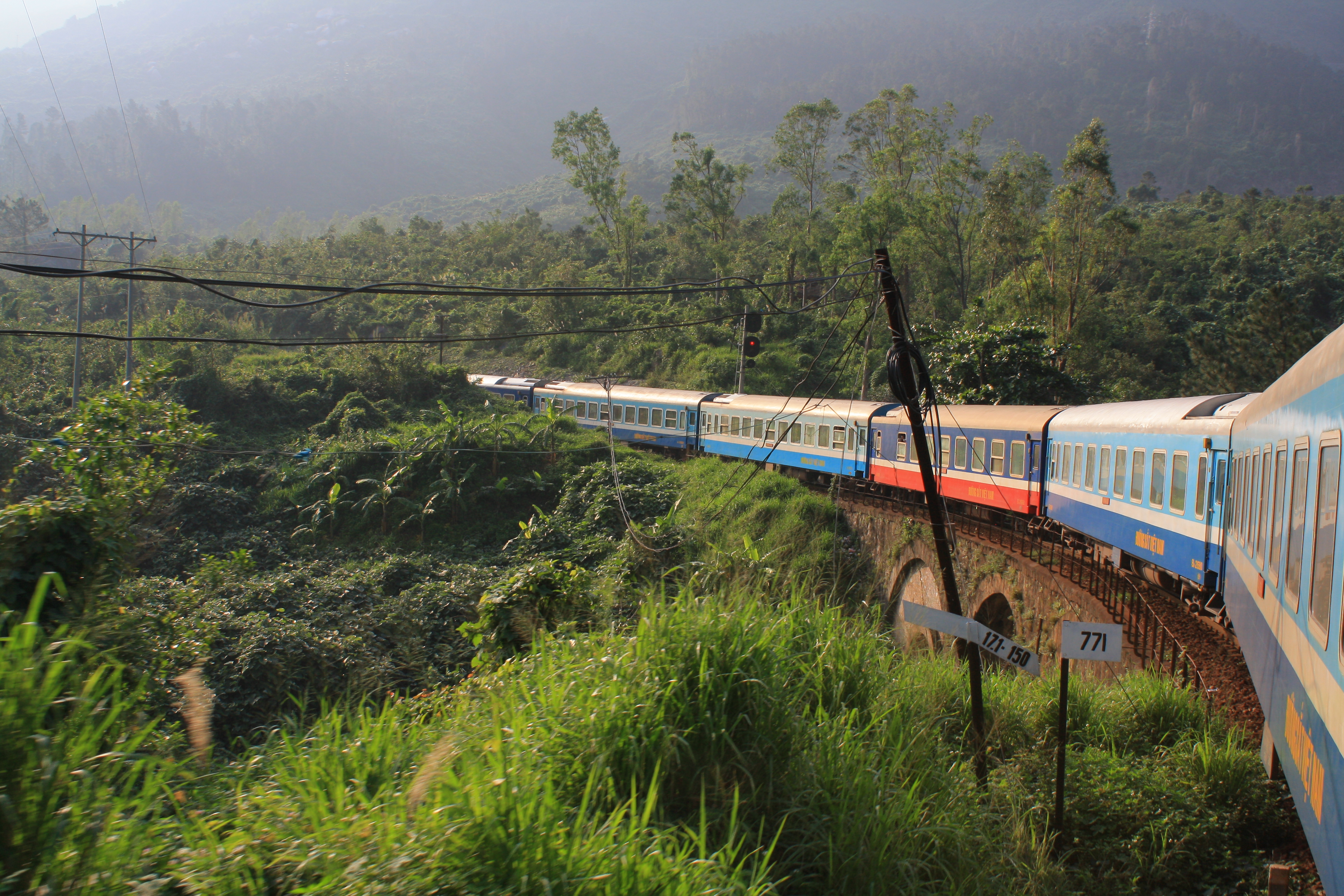
Travelling from Hội An to Hanoi.

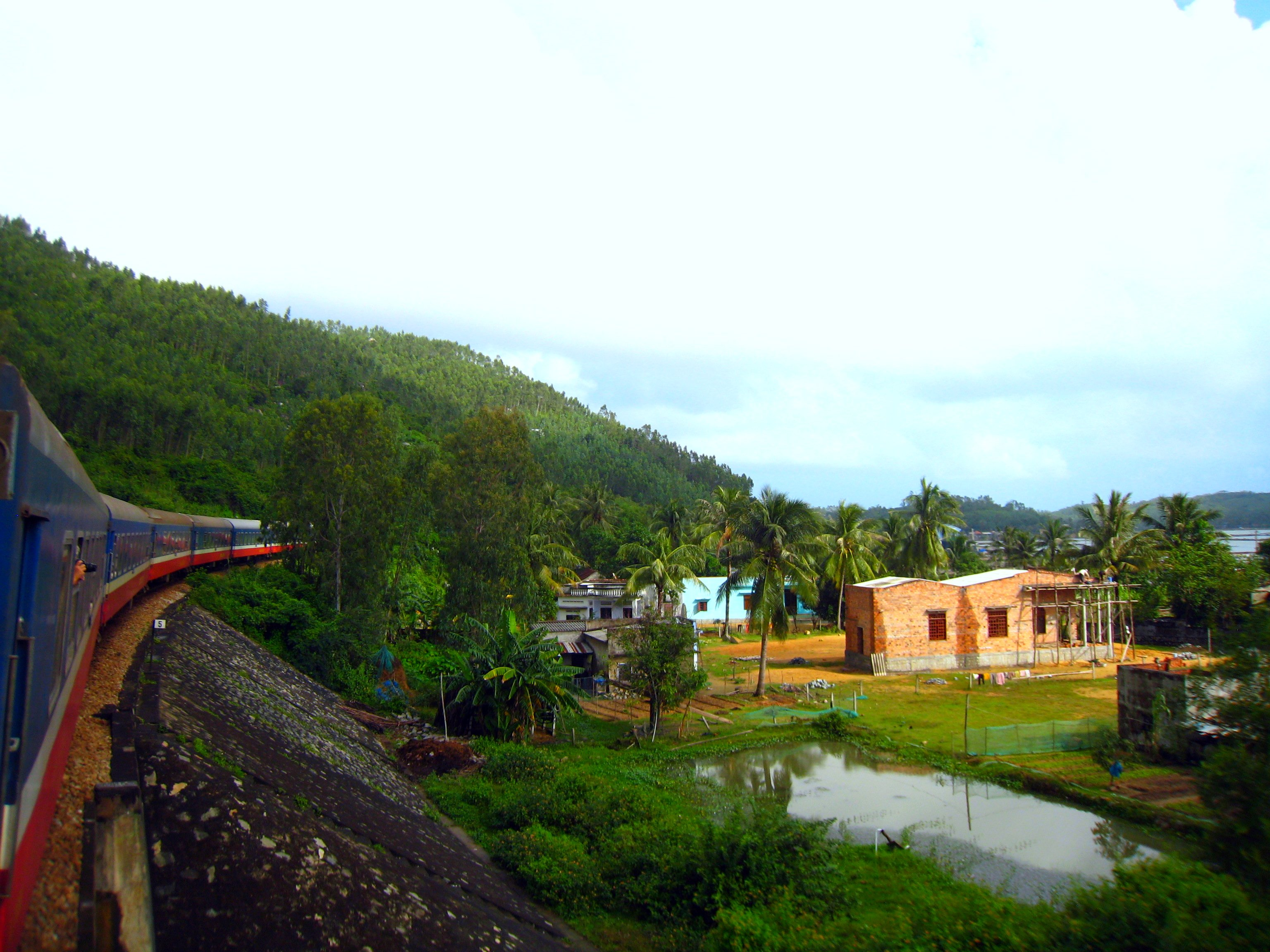
Travelling northward from Ho Chi Minh City to Da Nang.

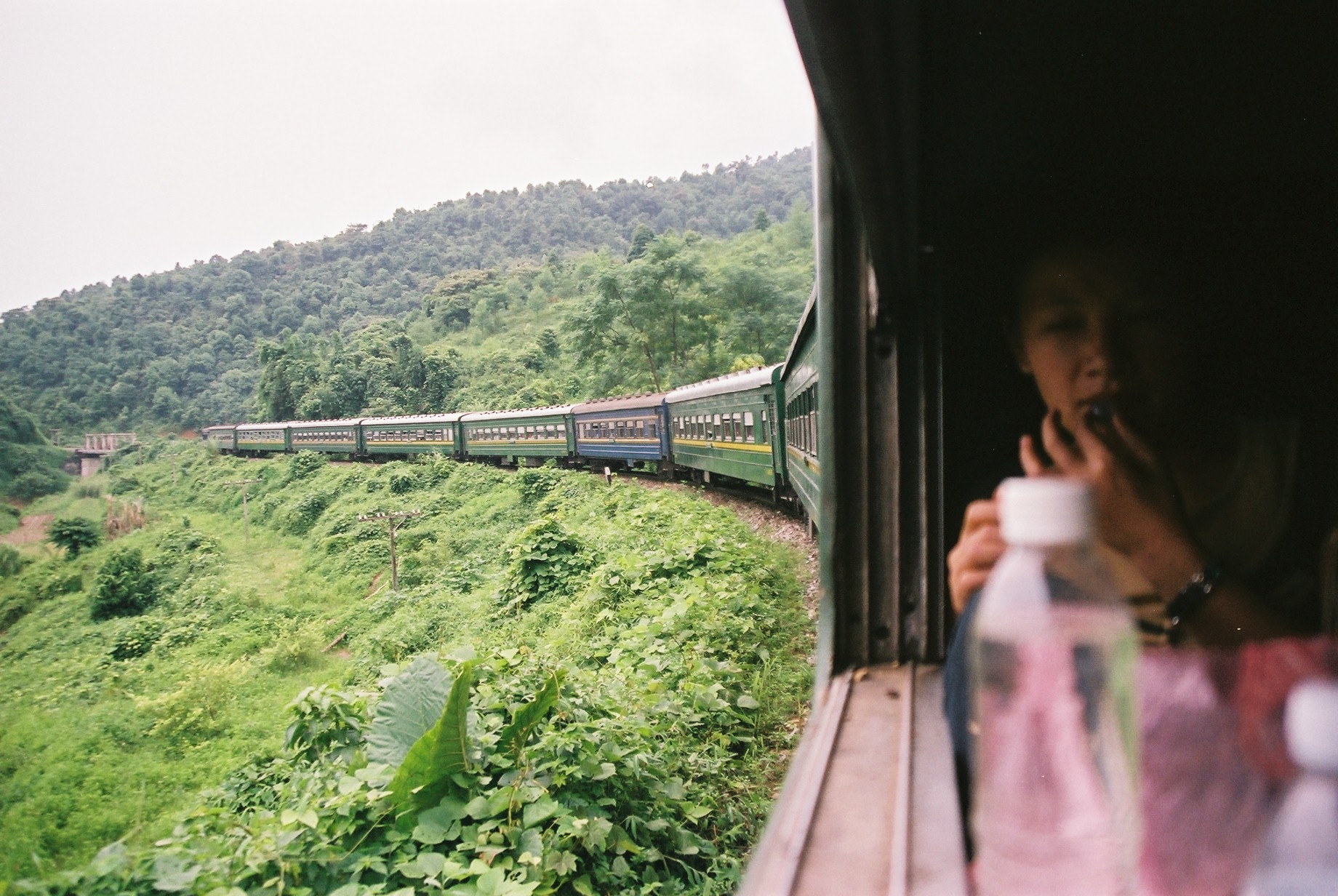
A passenger observes the scenery from her seat.

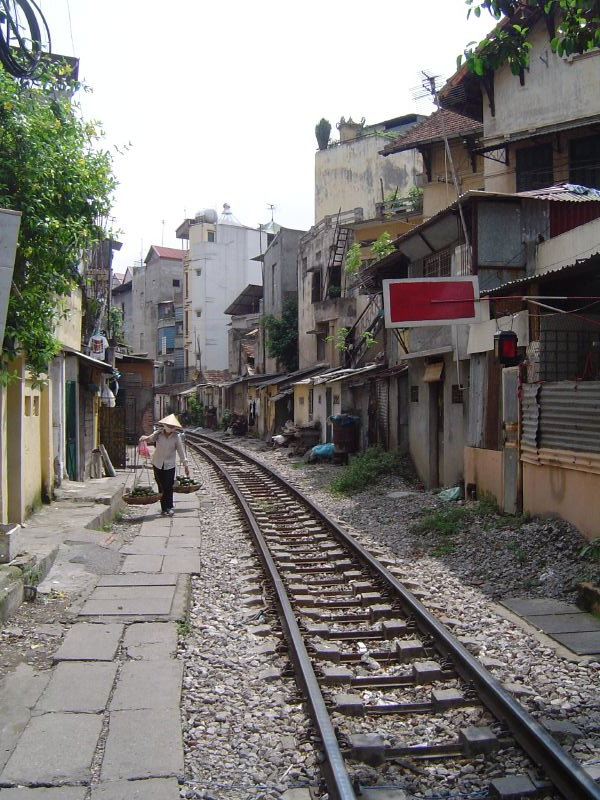
Railway tracks in Hanoi. The last km of both, northern and southern, lines to the main station (with 10 platform side tracks) looks like this.

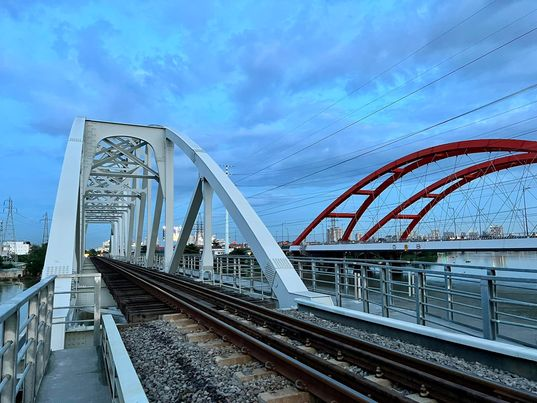
Bình Lợi Railway Bridge next to the same name bridge on Phạm Văn Đồng Boulevard crosses Saigon River in Ho Chi Minh City.

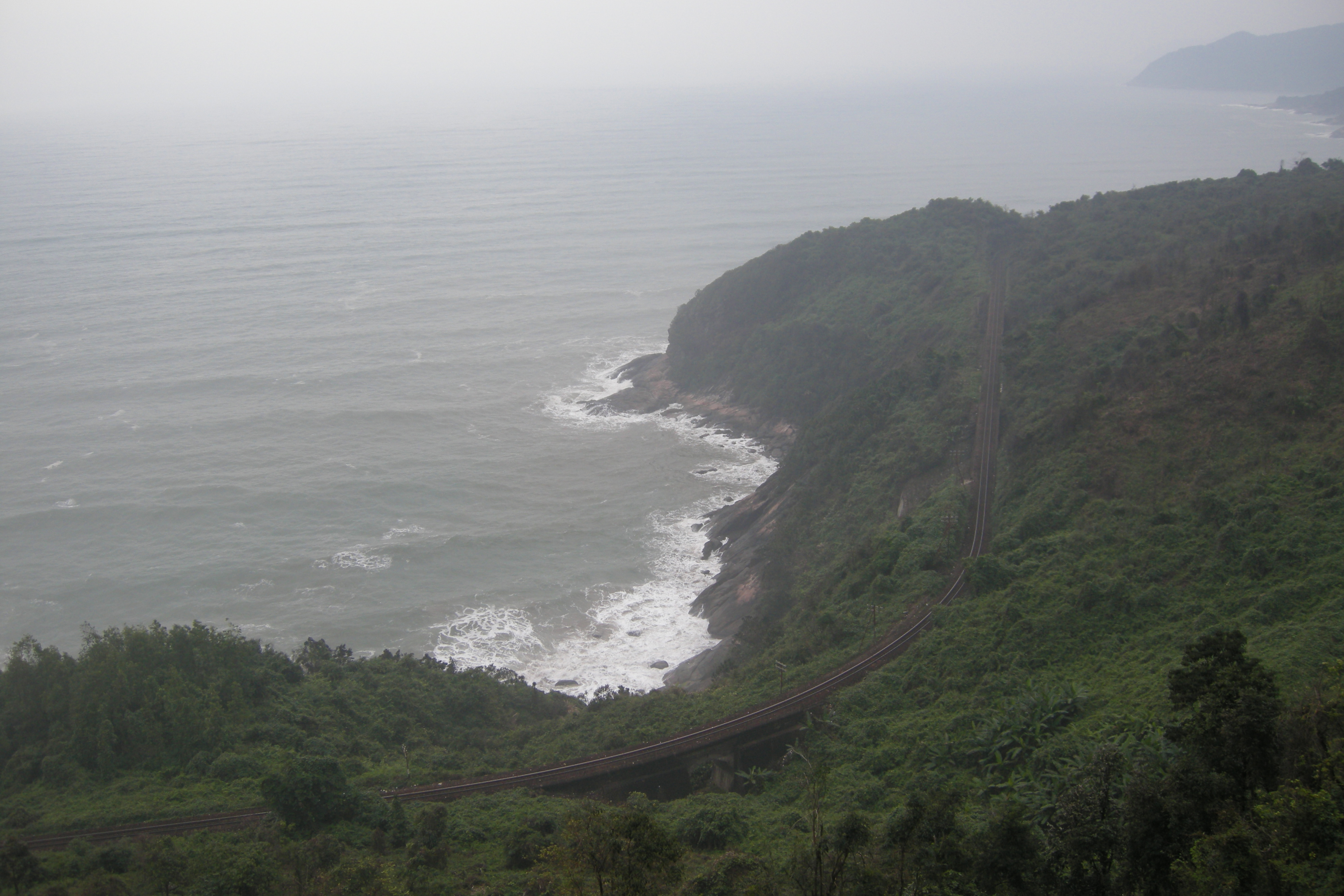
Railway track beneath the Hải Vân Pass between Huế and Da Nang.

== See also ==
- List of railway lines in Vietnam
- North–South Express Railway (Vietnam)
- Vietnam Railways

== Notes and references ==
Notes

Bibliography

- Hulot, Frédéric. Les chemins de fer de la France d'outre-mer, tome 1 l'Indochine, le Yunnan. La Régordane. 1990.
- Heiser, Joseph M. Jr. (1991). Logistic Support. Washington, D. C.: United States Army Center of Military History.
