= Hanoi railway station =

Railway station in Hanoi, Vietnam

Hanoi central station Ga Hà Nội
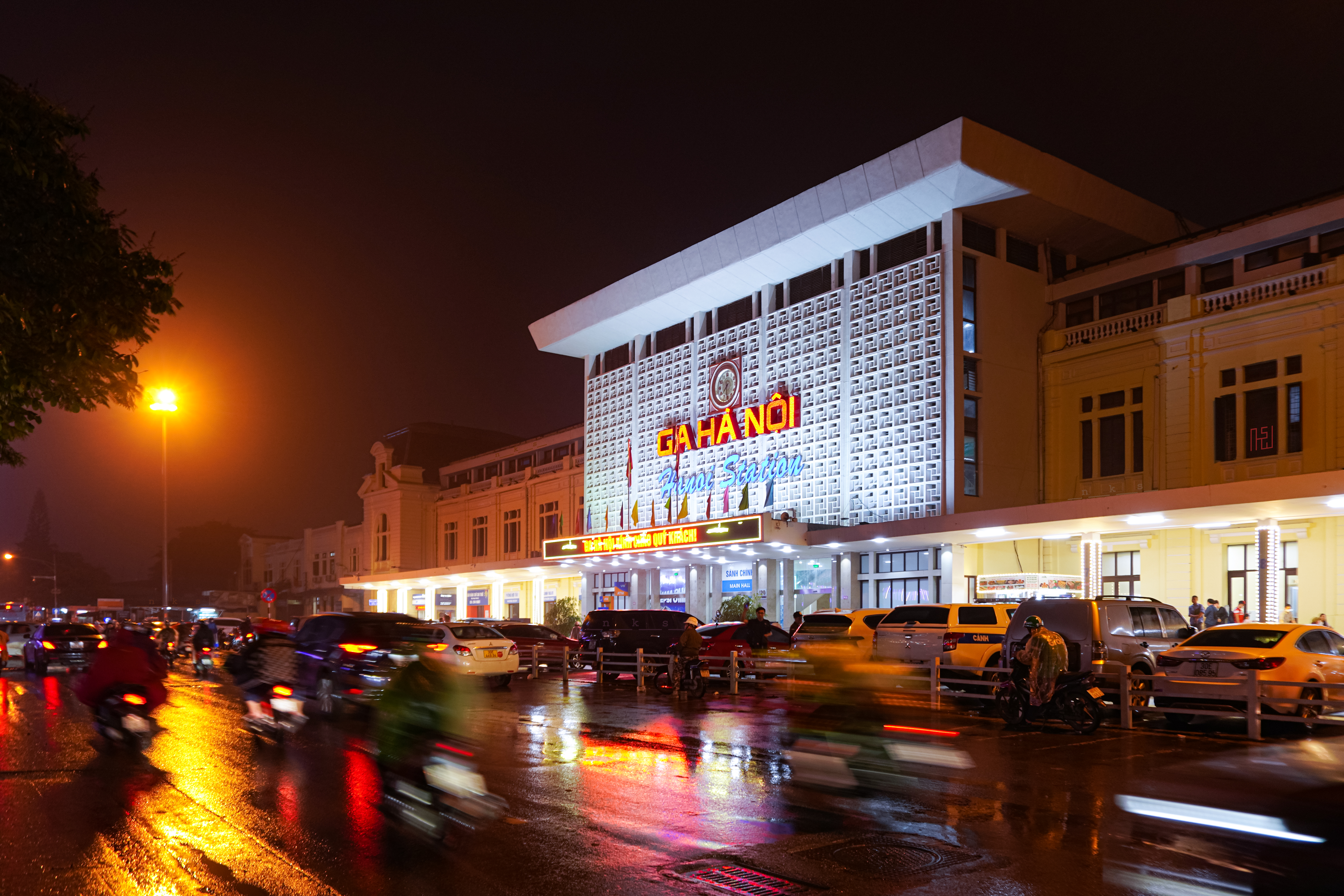
- Hanoi railway station at night

General information
- Location: 120 Lê Duẩn; Hoàn Kiếm District, Hanoi; Vietnam
- Coordinates: 21°01′27.9″N 105°50′27.9″E
- Owner: Vietnam Railways
- Operator: Vietnam Railways
- Lines: North-South railway Hanoi–Lào Cai railway Hanoi–Haiphong railway Hanoi–Đồng Đăng railway Hanoi–Quán Triều railway
- Platforms: 5 platforms
- Tracks: 15 tracks
- Connections: Hanoi Bus, Hanoi Metro

Other information
- Website: http://www.gahanoi.com.vn

History
- Opened: 1902

Passengers
- 3,500,000

Services
Preceding station	Vietnam Railways	Following station
Terminus	North–South	Giáp Bát towards Saigon
Terminus	Hanoi–Dong Dang	Long Biên towards Đồng Đăng
Terminus	Hanoi–Lao Cai	Long Biên towards Lào Cai
Terminus	Hanoi–Haiphong	Long Biên towards Hai Phong
Terminus	Hanoi–Quan Trieu	Long Biên towards Quán Triều
Preceding station	Hanoi Metro	Following station
Van Mieu T3 S11 towards Nhon	Line 3	Terminus
Phùng Hưng 07 towards Yên Viên	Line 1	Thống Nhất Park 09 towards Ngọc Hồi
Route map
North-South railway
Line 3
Location

Hanoi central station or simply Hanoi station (Vietnamese: Ga Hà Nội) is one of the main stations of Vietnam Railways, serving as the terminus of five of seven active routes in the national network, including the North–South railway (Reunification Express), the Hanoi–Lào Cai railway, the Hanoi–Haiphong Railway, the Hanoi–Đồng Đăng Railway, and the Hanoi–Quán Triều Railway. The station serves the capital city of Hanoi. The station is located at 120 Lê Duẩn Street, Cua Nam Ward, Hoan Kiem District in central Hanoi.

== History ==
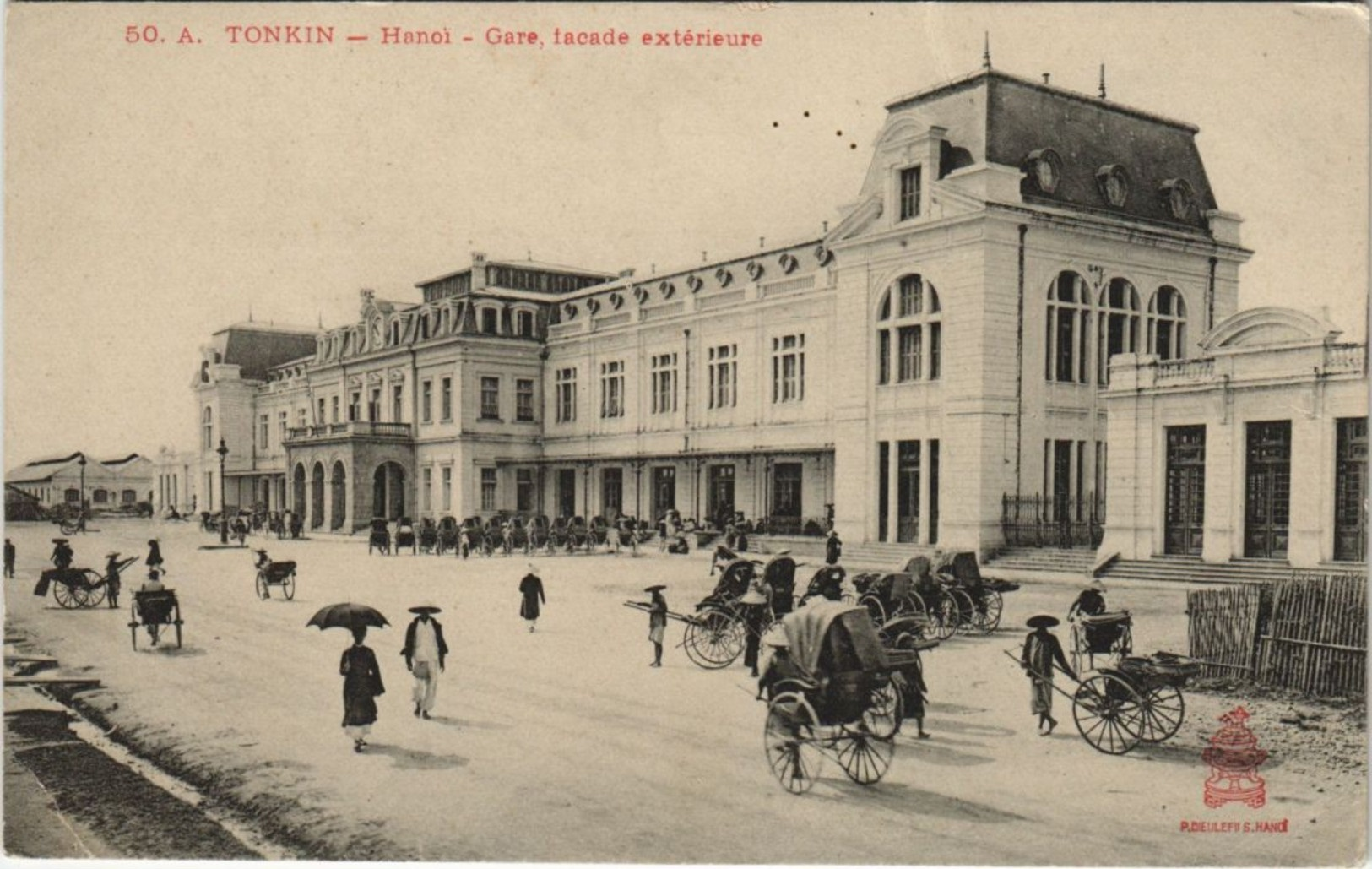
The old Hanoi station (Hang Co station)

In 1895, the Government of French Indochina choose the Hang Co Market area to build the main station of Hanoi. The old name of this station is Hang Co railway station. Hanoi railway station was built by France and opened in 1902. That time, Hanoi station had a Western-style design and It was design by Henri Vildieu. Hanoi railway station is also one of the largest station in South East Asia at that time. The building was damaged in the Vietnam War 1972 and in 1976 the central hall was rebuilt in modern style, preserving the historic side wings (only the middle was bombed).

== Services ==
Passenger services departing from Hanoi Main station:

To Đồng Đăng (for Beijing)
Train number:	M1 (T6 in China)	DD5
Hanoi depart:	18:30 Tuesdays & Fridays only	07:05

The train to Dong Dang is metre gauge and cannot continue on the Chinese railway network. Passengers destined for China must connect to a Chinese train at Pingxiang. Standard gauge tracks have been laid to Gia Lâm Railway Station, about 6 kilometres (3.7 mi) across the river from the main Hanoi Railway Station. Through trains to China depart from Gia Lâm rather than the main Hanoi Railway Station.

To Hải Phòng
Train number:	HP1	LP3	LP5	LP7
Hanoi Depart:	06:00	09:25	15:15	18:10

Trains to Hai Phong reach Hanoi Station on weekends and holidays only.

To Lao Cai (For Sapa)
Train Number:	SP3	SP7
Hanoi Depart:	22:00	22:40

To Saigon, The North - South route
Train number:	SE7	SE5	SE9	SE3	SE11	SE1
Hanoi depart:	6:00	8:00	13:00	19:20	20:40	21:45

, Other train
Train number:	SE19(To Da Nang)	QB1(To Dong Hoi)	NA1(To Vinh)	SE17(To Da Nang)
Hanoi depart:	19:45	20:00	22:45	20:25

The train to Nanning departs from Hanoi's Gia Lam station, along with two more trains to Haiphong.

== Gallery ==
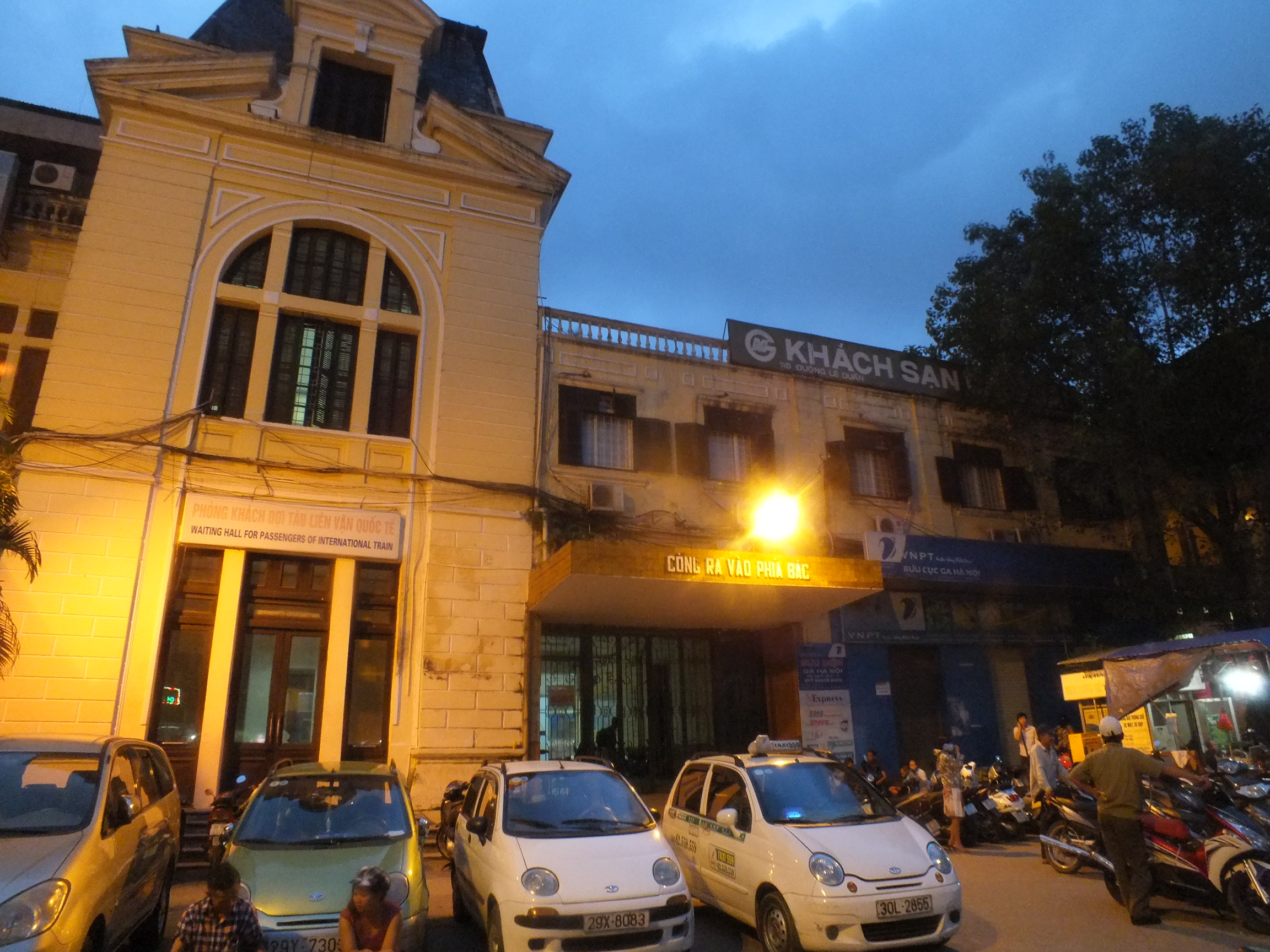
Old part of Hanoi railway station

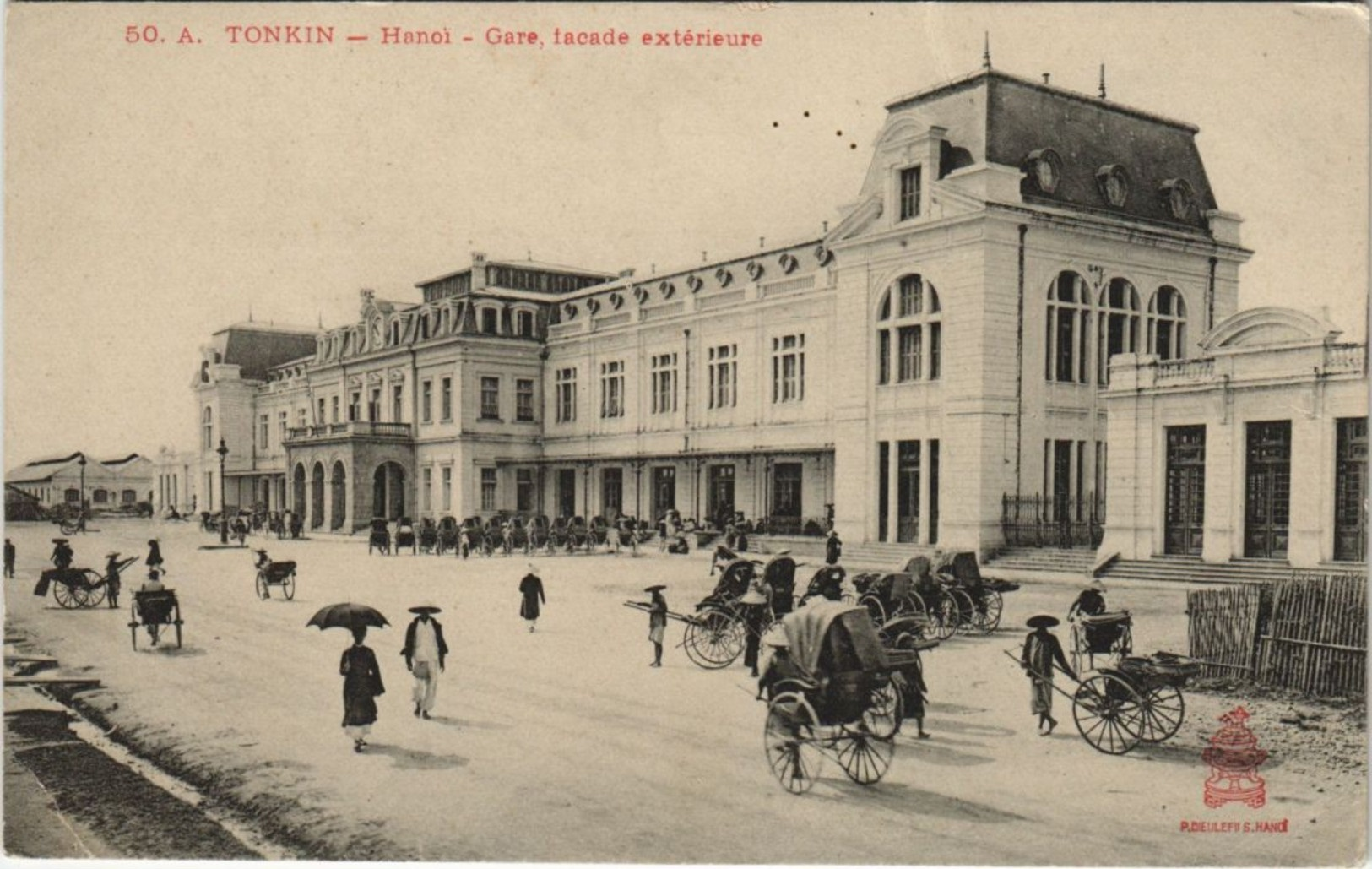
Gare d'Hanoï, 1912
