= Saigon station =

Railway station in Ho Chi Minh City, Vietnam

Coordinates: 10.7822°N 106.677°E

Saigon station Ga Sài Gòn
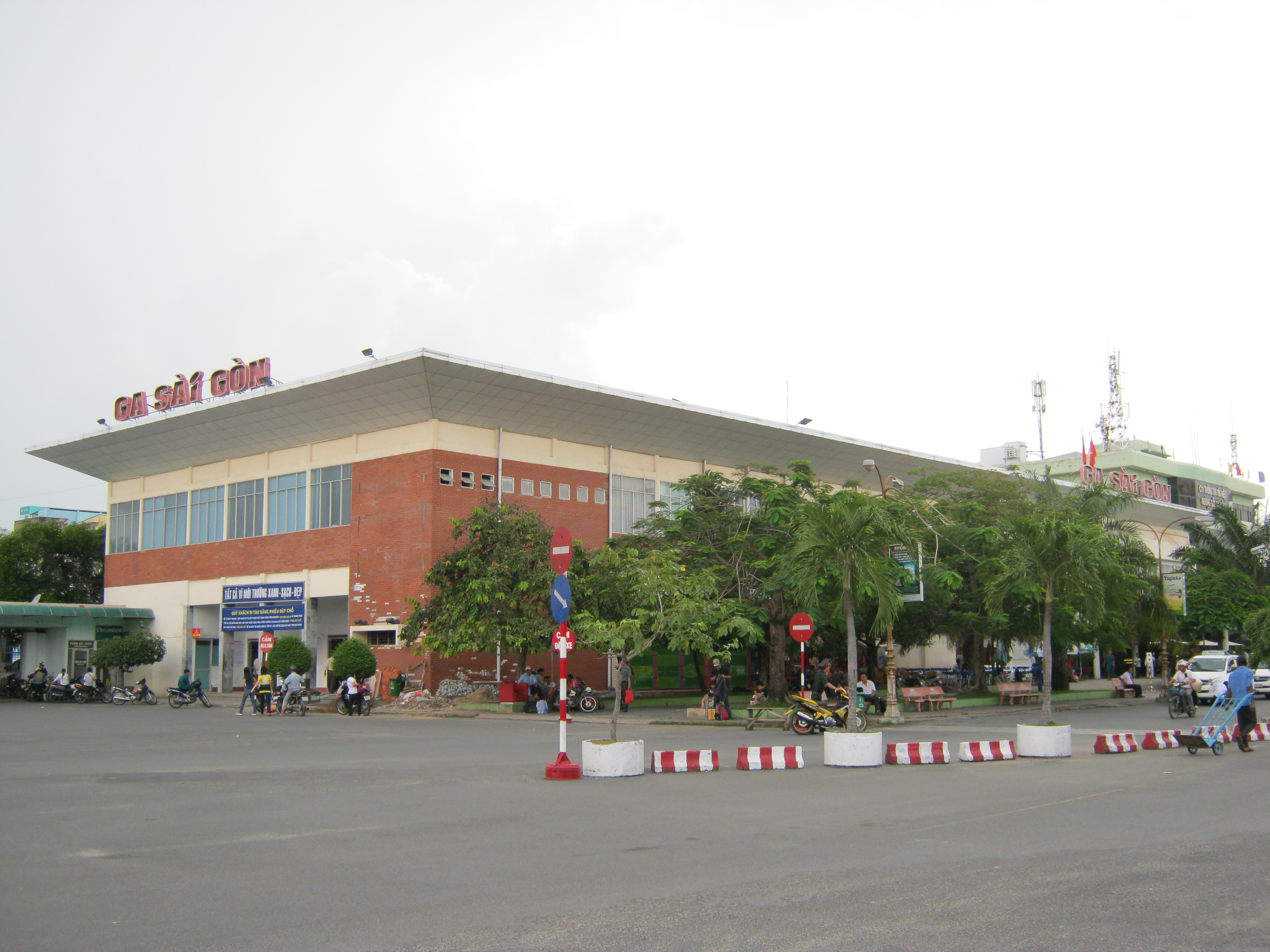

General information
- Other names: Hòa Hưng station (Pre-1983)
- Location: 1 Nguyen Thong Street, Ward 9 District 3, Ho Chi Minh City; Vietnam
- Operator: Vietnam Railways
- Line: North-South Railway
- Platforms: 3
- Tracks: 6
- Connections: Taxis, buses, L2 L8 L9 Hòa Hưng station (only Line 2 is under construction, the others are proposed)

Construction
- Structure type: Ground
- Parking: Yes
- Cycle facilities: Yes

History
- Opened: 1885

Services
Preceding station	Vietnam Railways	Following station
Gò Vấp towards Hanoi	North–South	Terminus
Location

Saigon station (previously Hòa Hưng station) is a railway station in District 3, Ho Chi Minh City, Vietnam. The station is a major hub in the national railway network. Located about 1 km from the city center, Saigon railway station is the final station on the North–South railway, and the southernmost point of the Vietnamese railways. The name of the station has remained the same despite the name of the city of Saigon being changed after the Vietnam War to Ho Chi Minh City (to honor the revolutionary leader who had declared independence back in 1945).

== History ==
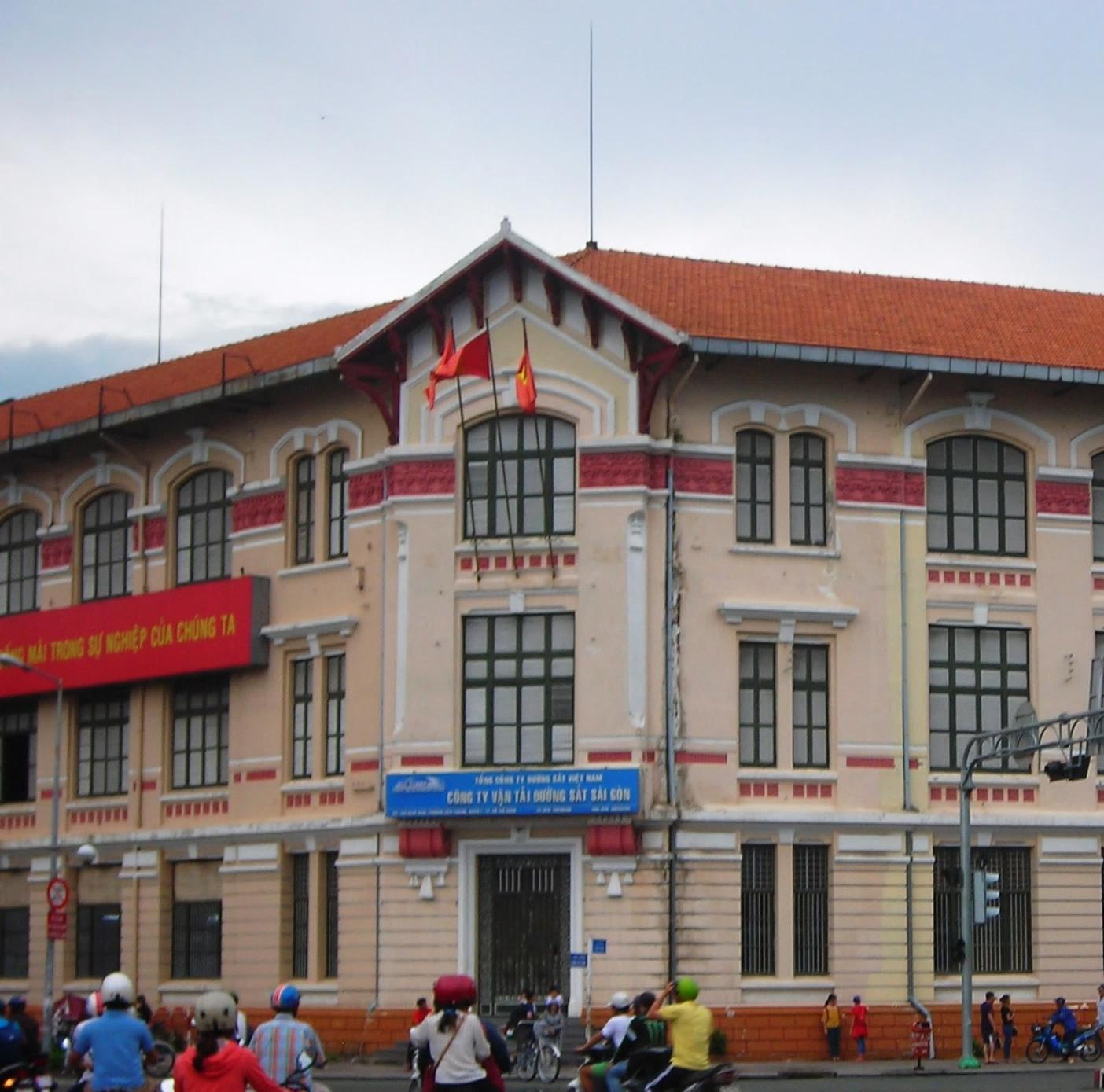
The colonial railway head office which is located in front of the former Saigon Station, now is the Vietnam Railways main booking office of HCMC.

The first Saigon station, which opened in 1885 as part of the Saigon–Mỹ Tho Railway, was located near the Quách Thị Trang Square in District 1. In 1904, Hanoi-Nha Trang Railway was opened but the first Saigon station was too small, so the colonial authorities decided to move the station. The second Saigon station was located at the southwest of the Bến Thành Market and constructed in 1915, now is the September 23 Park with Lê Lai Street and Phạm Ngũ Lão Street run along. The third and current Saigon station was opened in 1983 at Hòa Hưng, District 3.

Every year, one or two months before Tết, thousands of people queue all day at the station to buy tickets home, because it is the main booking office of Vietnam Railways. Though electronic booking machines have been adopted, the queues continue, due to the monopoly of the railway.

The head office is in 136 Hàm Nghi Boulevard, Ben Thanh Ward, District 1, Ho Chi Minh City.

== Binh Trieu station ==
Due to the requirements of urban planning, the city government is considering the relocation of the station to the city outskirts at Binh Trieu (Binh Trieu Railway Station).
