= List of railway lines in Vietnam =

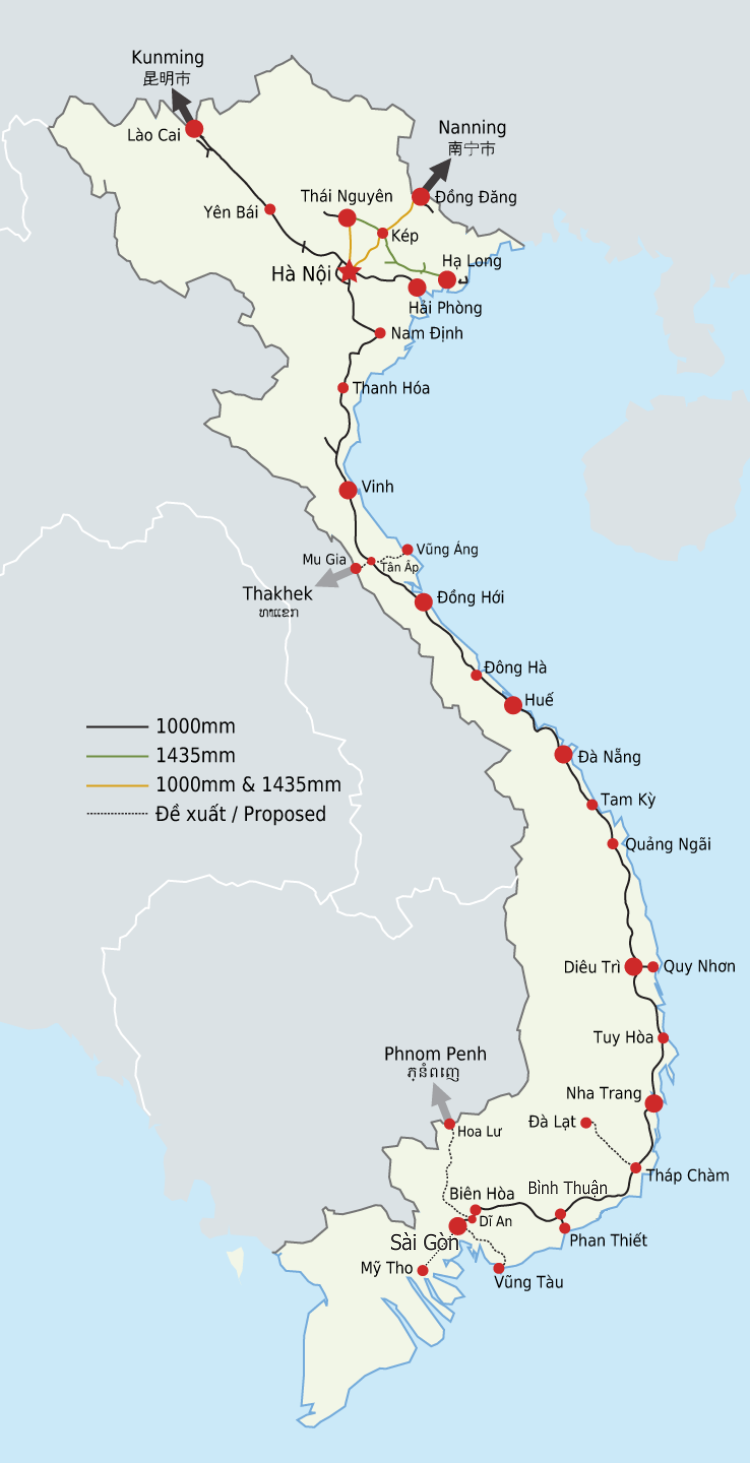
The Vietnamese railway network.

This list enumerates railway lines in Vietnam. The Vietnamese railway system is owned and primarily operated by the state-owned Vietnam Railways (Vietnamese: Đường sắt Việt Nam), although private railway companies also offer special service to key destinations. Its principal route is the 1,726 km (1,072 mi) single track North–South Railway line running between Hanoi and Ho Chi Minh City; as of 2007, 85% of the network's passenger volume and 60% of its cargo volume is transported along this line. Besides this one, the system includes lines connecting Hanoi to the People's Republic of China, to surrounding cities such as Thái Nguyên, Hai Phong and Hạ Long.

Most existing Vietnamese railway lines use metre gauge, although standard gauge (used in China) and mixed gauge are used northeast of Hanoi. As of 2005, approximately 2,600 km (1,600 mi) of track was in use throughout Vietnam—2,169 km (1,348 mi) meter gauge, 178 km (111 mi) standard gauge and 253 km (157 mi) mixed gauge. As of 2005, there were 278 stations on the Vietnamese railway network, 191 of which are located along the North-South Railway line.

New railway lines have been proposed for construction, such as the 1,570 km (980 mi) high-speed North–South express railway connecting Hanoi and Ho Chi Minh City, which would reduce travel times from 30 hours to 6 hours. Other proposals aim to restore or completely rebuild previously existing lines that fell into disuse after the French Indochina War and the Vietnam War, such as the Da Lat–Thap Cham line, which now serves only to ferry tourists between Đà Lạt and the nearby village of Trại Mát. International links to Cambodia and Laos are also under consideration.

== Current lines ==
Description	Established	Length	Stations	Travel time	Gauge
North–South railway	1936	1,726 km (1,072 mi)	191	30 hrs	Metre gauge
Railroad tracks on the North–South railway near Mỹ Sơn, in central Vietnam. The Hanoi–Ho Chi Minh City line is the primary railway line serving Vietnam. Trains travelling this line are sometimes referred to as the 'Reunification Express'. This line should not be confused with the proposed North–South express railway (see below). Major stations: Hanoi station (Hanoi); Phủ Lý station (Phủ Lý, Hà Nam Province); Nam Định station (Nam Định, Nam Định Province); Thanh Hóa station (Thanh Hóa, Thanh Hóa Province); Vinh station (Vinh, Nghệ An Province); Tân Ấp station (Tân Ấp, Quảng Bình Province); Đồng Hới station (Đồng Hới, Quảng Bình Province); Đông Hà station (Đông Hà, Quảng Trị Province); Huế station (Huế, Thừa Thiên–Huế Province); Da Nang station (Da Nang); Tam Kỳ station (Tam Kỳ, Quảng Nam Province); Quảng Ngãi station (Quảng Ngãi, Quảng Ngãi Province); Diêu Trì station (Qui Nhơn, Bình Định Province); Tuy Hòa station (Tuy Hòa, Phú Yên Province); Nha Trang station (Nha Trang, Khánh Hòa Province); Bình Thuận station (Phan Thiết, Bình Thuận Province); Saigon station (Ho Chi Minh City)
Hanoi–Lào Cai railway	1906	296 km (184 mi)	40	10 hrs	Metre gauge
Travelling on the Hanoi–Lào Cai line. The railway link from Hanoi to Lào Cai was originally built by the French administration of Indochina in the early 20th century, as part of an international railway link between Haiphong and the Chinese city of Kunming. Major stations: Hanoi station (Hanoi); Long Biên station (Hanoi); Gia Lâm station (Hanoi); Yên Viên station (Hanoi); Đông Anh station (Hanoi); Việt Trì station (Việt Trì, Phú Thọ Province); Phú Thọ station (Phú Thọ, Phú Thọ Province); Yên Bái station (Yên Bái, Yên Bái Province); Lào Cai station (Lào Cai, Lào Cai Province); International links: Hekou North, China (freight only); Kunming, China (currently suspended)
Hanoi–Đồng Đăng railway	1902	163 km (101 mi)	23	4.25 hrs	Mixed gauge
Friendship Pass, on the China–Vietnam border near Dong Dang. Đồng Đăng is a station at the Vietnamese border with China, forming a part of the international Hanoi-Nanning rail link. There is direct international passenger service on the line (the Beijing-Nanning-Hanoi Through Train). Major stations: Hanoi station (Hanoi); Long Biên station (Hanoi); Gia Lâm station (Hanoi); Yên Viên station (Hanoi); Bắc Ninh station (Bắc Ninh, Bắc Ninh Province); Bắc Giang station (Bắc Giang, Bắc Giang Province); Kép station (Kép, Bắc Giang Province); Lạng Sơn station (Lạng Sơn, Lạng Sơn Province); Đồng Đăng station (Đồng Đăng, Lạng Sơn Province); International links: Nanning, China; Beijing, China
Kép–Hạ Long railway	1950s	106 km (66 mi)	12	4.5 hrs	Standard gauge
Major stations: Kép station (Kép, Bắc Giang Province); Lan Mẫu station (Lan Mẫu, Bắc Giang Province); Mạo Khê station (Mạo Khê, Quảng Ninh Province); Uông Bí station (Uông Bí, Quảng Ninh Province); Yên Cư station (Yên Cư, Quảng Ninh Province); Hạ Long station (Hạ Long, Quảng Ninh Province)
Bắc Hồng–Văn Điển railway	1982	39.2 km (24.4 mi)	5	??	Metre gauge
Major stations: Bắc Hồng station (Hanoi); Văn Điển station (Hanoi)
Hanoi–Haiphong railway	1902	102 km (63 mi)	18	2.5 hrs	Metre gauge
Hai Phong station. The railway link from Hanoi to Haiphong was originally built by the French administration of Indochina in the early 20th century, as part of an international railway link between Haiphong and the Chinese city of Kunming. Major stations: Hanoi station (Hanoi); Long Biên station (Hanoi); Gia Lâm station (Hanoi); Hải Dương station (Hải Dương, Hải Dương Province); Hai Phong station (Hai Phong)
Hanoi–Thái Nguyên railway	1962	75 km (47 mi)	14	3 hrs	Mixed gauge
Also known as the Hanoi-Quan Trieu line or the Dong Anh-Quan Trieu line. Major stations: Hanoi station (Hanoi); Long Biên station (Hanoi); Gia Lâm station (Hanoi); Yên Viên station (Hanoi); Đông Anh station (Hanoi); Lưu Xá station (Thái Nguyên, Thái Nguyên Province); Thái Nguyên station (Thái Nguyên, Thái Nguyên Province); Quán Triều station (Quán Triều, Thái Nguyên Province)
Thái Nguyên–Kép	1966	57 km (35 mi)	6? (Note: Assuming Lưu Xá and Kép stations had already been built prior to 1966. "The First Division had to construct four tunnels, ... four train stations, and several bridges along the Kép-Thái Nguyên [or Ke-Tai, central] line." Col. Hou Zhenlu, quoted in Xiaobing Li, Robert McMahon (2010). Voices from the Vietnam War: Stories from American, Asian, and Russian Veterans. University Press of Kentucky. p. 221. ISBN 978-0-8131-2592-3.)	??	Standard gauge
The Thái Nguyên–Kép railway line was a strategic, standard-gauge line constructed between October 1965 and December 1966 by a railroad engineering division of the Chinese People's Liberation Army, who operated in North Vietnam repairing railway lines at the request of Ho Chi Minh. Major stations: Lưu Xá station (Thái Nguyên, Thái Nguyên Province); Kép station (Kép, Bắc Giang Province)
Phố Lu–Pom Hán railway	??	25 km (16 mi)	2	??	Metre gauge
The Pho Lu–Xuan Giao branch crossing the Bo River on a bridge shared with the National Route 4E Also called the Pho Lu–Pom Han line. A branch line connected to the Yunnan–Vietnam Railway at Phố Lu, south of Lào Cai, used to carry apatite from the mines located along the line to the fertilizer factory located at Tien Kien.
Tien Kien–Bai Bang	??	10.5 km (6.5 mi)	??	??	Metre gauge?
A branch line connected to the Yunnan–Vietnam Railway, near Phú Thọ.
Da Lat–Trại Mát	1932	7 km (4.3 mi)	2	??	Metre gauge
Part of the rack railway that once connected the towns of Đà Lạt and Tháp Chàm. Since the line's abandonment after the Vietnam War, only a 7 km section remains in use, running from Da Lat station to the nearby village of Trại Mát, operated as a tourist attraction. See Đà Lạt–Tháp Chàm railway below. Major stations: Da Lat station (Đà Lạt); Trại Mát station (Trại Mát)
Tien Kien–Lam Thao	??	4.1 km (2.5 mi)	??	??	Metre gauge
A branch line connected to the Yunnan–Vietnam Railway, near Phú Thọ. Originally served a military complex.

== Proposed lines ==
Several railway lines have been proposed for construction in Vietnam in recent years. The largest such project is the high-speed North–South express railway connecting Ha Noi and Ho Chi Minh City, valued at approximately US$56 billion. Due to its cost, plans for the line are currently on hold pending further study of the project. Other projects involve the restoration of previously existing lines, such as the Da Lat–Tháp Chàm line and the Ho Chi Minh City–Lộc Ninh, both of which were originally built in the 1930s, but fell into disuse after decades of war. The Ho Chi Minh City–Loc Ninh line, along with a new Mu Gia–Vung Ang line, would permit new international railway links to Cambodia and Laos, respectively.

The metric lines are able to speeds up to 140km/h (130km/h used in Taiwan metric railways), and 160km/h with pendular trains (done in New Zealand), depending on curve radius and maintenance.

Description	Length	Gauge
North–South express railway	1,570 km (980 mi)	Standard gauge
Ho Chi Minh City–Cần Thơ express railway	139 km (86 mi)	Standard gauge
Japanese Shinkansen technology has been suggested for use on the proposed North–South express railway (Photo: Taiwan High Speed Rail). National railway company Vietnam Railways has proposed a high-speed rail link between Hanoi and Ho Chi Minh City, capable of running at 300 to 350 km/h (186 to 217 mph). Funding of the $56 billion line would mainly come from the Vietnamese government; reports suggest Japanese development aid could be made available in stages, conditioned on the adoption of Shinkansen technology. Once completed, the high-speed rail line would allow trains to complete the Hanoi-Ho Chi Minh City journey in approximately 6 hours. Vietnam's National Assembly rejected the existing plan for the line in June 2010, and asked for further study of the project. Major stations: Hanoi station (Ha Noi); Phủ Lý station (Phủ Lý, Hà Nam Province); Nam Định station (Nam Định, Nam Định Province); Thanh Hóa station (Thanh Hóa, Thanh Hóa Province); Haiphong station (Hai Phong); Vinh station (Vinh, Nghệ An Province); Đồng Hới station (Đồng Hới, Quảng Bình Province); Đông Hà station (Đông Hà, Quảng Trị Province); Huế station (Huế, Thừa Thiên–Huế Province); Da Nang station (Da Nang); Tam Kỳ station (Tam Kỳ, Quảng Nam Province); Quảng Ngãi station (Quảng Ngãi, Quảng Ngãi Province); Dieu Tri station (Qui Nhơn, Bình Định Province); Tuy Hòa station (Tuy Hòa, Phú Yên Province); Nha Trang station (Nha Trang, Khánh Hòa Province); Muong Man station (Phan Thiết, Bình Thuận Province); Saigon station (Ho Chi Minh City)
Da Lat–Thap Cham	127 km (79 mi)	Metre gauge
A locomotive travels on the Đà Lạt–Tháp Chàm line. The town of Đà Lạt was once connected by a rack railway to the main north-south line at Tháp Chàm. Construction of the line initially began in 1908. The 38 km (24 mi) Tháp Chàm–Sông Pha section opened in 1919, and the second section, running 43 km (27 mi) from Sông Pha to Đà Lạt, opened in 1932. Since the line's abandonment after the Vietnam War, only a 7 km section remains in use, running from Da Lat station to the nearby village of Trại Mát, operated as a tourist attraction. A proposed renewal project, backed by provincial and local governments, aims to restore the original Đà Lạt–Tháp Chàm railway to handle both passenger and cargo transportation. Major stations: Da Lat station (Đà Lạt); Trại Mát station (Trại Mát); Song Pha Railway Station; Tháp Chàm station (Tháp Chàm)
Ho Chi Minh City–Vũng Tàu	110 km (68 mi)	Metre gauge
A new railway line connecting Ho Chi Minh City to Vũng Tàu, a port on the South China Sea, has been proposed. The line would serve both freight and passenger transport. Major stations: Saigon station (Ho Chi Minh City); Biên Hòa station (Biên Hoà); Vũng Tàu station (Vũng Tàu)
Dĩ An–Lộc Ninh Railway	128.5 km (79.8 mi)	Metre gauge
A locomotive waits at Lộc Ninh station during the French colonial era. In 1933, a private railroad connecting Lộc Ninh in Bình Phước Province to Ben Dong Xo was opened. The line was connected to the main North–South line in 1937, connecting Loc Ninh to Saigon via Dĩ An. The route from Dĩ An to Lộc Ninh had 17 railway stations. The line was abandoned after 1959, and was dismantled at the conclusion of the Vietnam War. Many portions of the line still exist, although they are largely used by local farmers as access roads to reach their fields; two portions of track near Phu Cuong and Dĩ An have been removed to accommodate urban development. A proposal to refurbish the line was presented in September 2007. The line would begin with a junction of the North–South Railway at Dĩ An station, and would end in Lộc Ninh, close to the Cambodian border. The railway's cost is estimated at US$438 million. In the same year, the Cambodian Ministry of Transportation announced plans to build a railway line to connect Loc Ninh to Phnom Penh, reportedly with Chinese assistance. The line would be part of the proposed Trans-Asian Railway. So far, the project will consist of 11 stations with the cost of 4,624 million Yuan to be financed by China. Major stations: Saigon station (Ho Chi Minh City); Dĩ An station (Dĩ An); Lộc Ninh station (Lộc Ninh); International links Phnom Penh, Cambodia
Mụ Giạ–Vung Ang Railway	??	??
Plans for a line connecting the Vietnamese railway network to Laos were originally researched at the turn of the 20th century. In the 1930s, a limited amount of work was done on a railway line connecting Tan Ap, south of Vinh on the North–South line, to Thakhek in Laos, where tin deposits were being exploited at the time. The first 17.5 km (10.9 mi) had been constructed west of Tan Ap by 1933, but construction was eventually abandoned due to poor economic forecasts. The completed line would have been 187 km (116 mi) long, travelling under the Mụ Giạ Pass via a tunnel. In 2007, the Laotian Ministry of Transportation entered into discussion with Vietnam to discuss the possibility of completing the Thakhek–Tan Ap line, and adding an extension to Vung Ang, a port in Hà Tĩnh Province which the Vietnamese Government plans to expand. Both Laos and Thailand have expressed interest in the project as a shorter export gateway to the Pacific Ocean. Major stations: Mụ Giạ station (Mụ Giạ, Quảng Bình Province); Tân Ấp station (Tân Ấp, Quảng Bình Province); Vung Ang station (Vung Ang, Hà Tĩnh Province); International links Thakhek, Laos

== Defunct lines ==
Description	Established	Length	Gauge
Phu Lang Thuong–Lạng Sơn	1895	31 km (19 mi)	600mm
A strategic line connecting Lạng Sơn to Phu Lang Thuong (now known as Bắc Giang), and the first railway line to be built in Tonkin. Construction took place from 1890 to 1895, costing around 20 million francs. Originally built at 600 mm (1 ft 11 5/8 in) gauge, the line was converted to metre gauge and expanded south to Hanoi and north to the Chinese border at Dong Dang. See Hanoi–Dong Dang Railway above.
Cầu Giát – Nghĩa Đàn	—	30 km (19 mi)	Metre gauge
An incomplete line that was abandoned before World War II, intended to serve quarries around the town of Nghia Dan. Some traces of the line still exist.
Gia Dinh–Hoc Mon	??	20 km (12 mi)	??
Originally built as a branch line to the Saigon–Cholon tramway, the line fell into disrepair during World War II, and was completely dismantled during the First Indochina War. The line was originally intended to form a link between Saigon and Phnom Penh in Cambodia.
Tan Ap–Thakhek	—	17.5 km (10.9 mi)	Metre gauge?
An incomplete line branching off the North–South Railway towards Laos. See the proposed Mu Gia–Vung Ang line above.
Don Dien Coudoux–Xom Cuc	1960s	17 km (11 mi)	Metre gauge
A strategic line built in the 1960s to accelerate the provision of logistical military support on the Ho Chi Minh trail, which began at Xom Cuc and continued south into the Mụ Giạ Pass.
Đồng Đăng–Na Sam	??	15 km (9.3 mi)	Metre gauge or 600mm
A strategic line branching off the Hanoi–Đồng Đăng Railway, following Colonial Road No. 4 towards Cao Bằng. Dismantled soon after the First Indochina War.
Mai Pha–Dong	??	7 km (4.3 mi)	Standard gauge
A branch line on the Hanoi–Đồng Đăng Railway, serving as a bypass of the town of Lạng Sơn to allow Chinese military trains to enter Vietnam during the Vietnam War.
Trang Bom–Ap Thanh Lam	—	??	??
An incomplete line east of Saigon, near Xuân Lộc, intended to serve an area of rubber plantations. The line is indicated on certain detailed maps of the era.

== See also ==
- Rail transport in Vietnam
- Transport in Vietnam

== Notes and references ==
Notes

Bibliography

- "Vietnam: Transport Infrastructure" (PDF). World Bank. May 2004.
