= Gia Lâm station =

Railway station in Hanoi, Vietnam

Coordinates: 21°03′09″N 105°52′52″E

Gia Lam Ga Gia Lâm
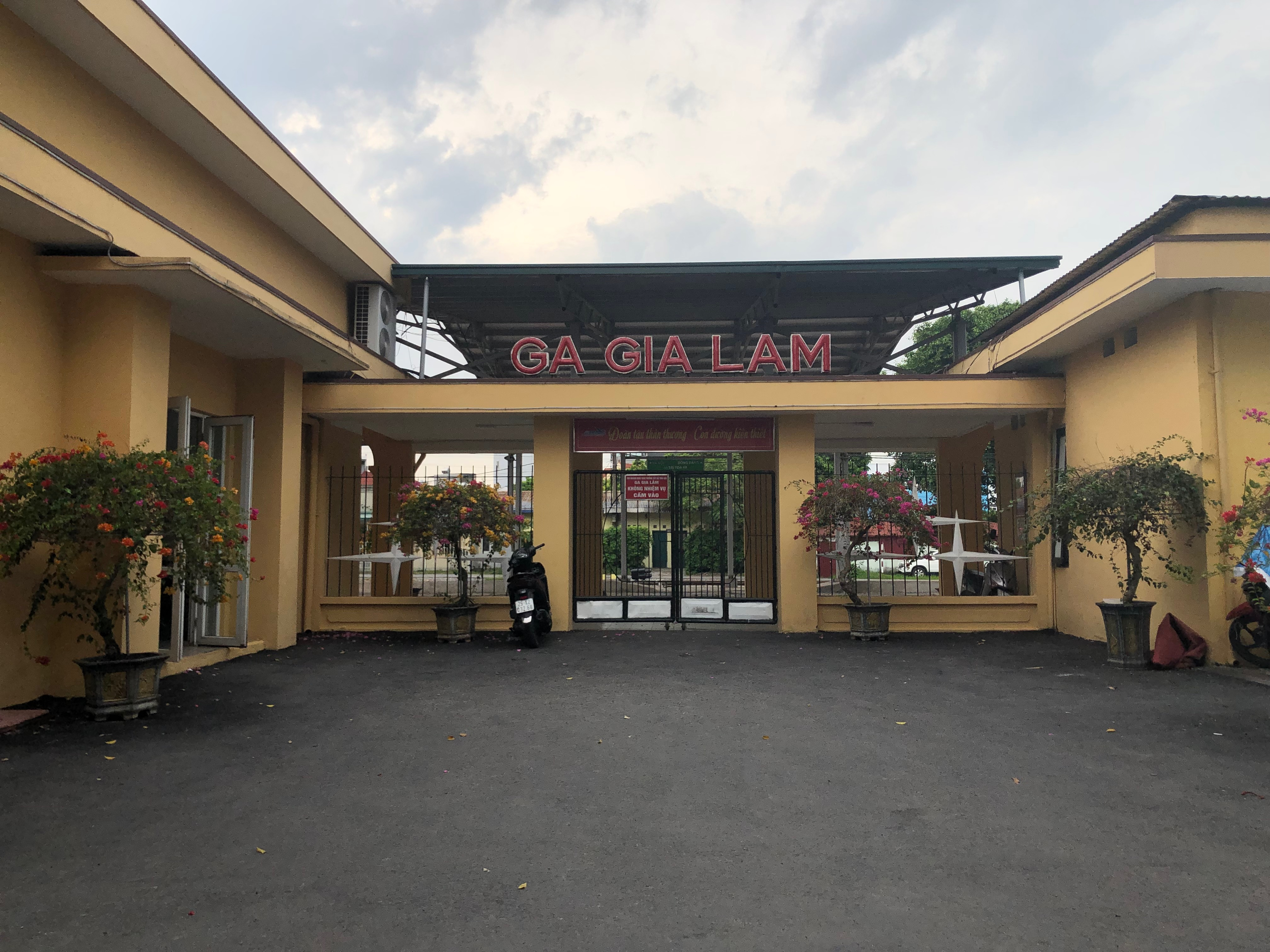

General information
- Location: Long Biên, Hà Nội; Vietnam
- Owner: Vietnam Railways
- Operator: Vietnam Railways
- Lines: Hanoi–Lào Cai Railway; Hanoi–Haiphong Railway; Hanoi–Đồng Đăng Railway
- Platforms: 1
- Tracks: 6

Construction
- Structure type: Ground

Services
Preceding station	Vietnam Railways	Following station
Terminus	Beijing–Nanning–Hanoi	Bắc Giang towards Beijing (China)
Long Biên towards Hanoi	Hanoi–Dong Dang	Yên Viên towards Đồng Đăng
Long Biên towards Hanoi	Hanoi–Lao Cai	Yên Viên towards Lào Cai
Long Biên towards Hanoi	Hanoi–Haiphong	Yên Viên towards Hai Phong
Long Biên towards Hanoi	Hanoi–Quan Trieu	Yên Viên towards Quán Triều
Location

Gia Lâm station is a railway station in Vietnam, in the north eastern Long Biên District of Hanoi. It serves the city of Hanoi. It is the terminus of the standard-gauge railway linking Vietnam to China, known as the Hanoi–Đồng Đăng railway. The daily train to Nanning (610 km) departs from this station instead of the main Hanoi railway station, which is served only by metre gauge tracks, as does the Beijing–Nanning–Hanoi through train.

The station served as the terminus of Vietnam's first luxury train called SJourney.
