= Long Biên station =

Railway station in Hoàn Kiếm, Vietnam

Coordinates: 21°02′23″N 105°51′01″E

Long Bien station Ga Long Biên
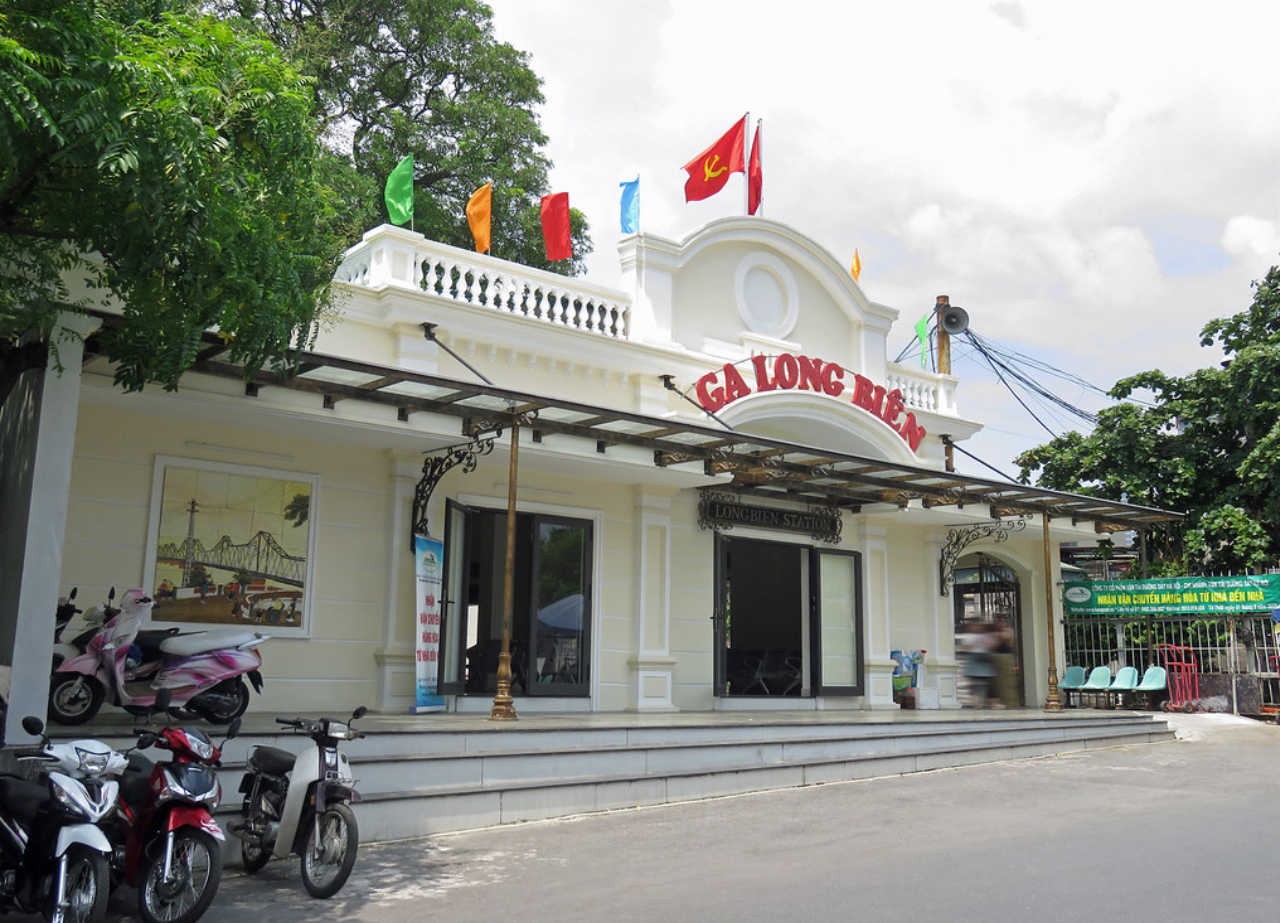
- Front gate of Long Bien station, at the end of Long Bien Bridge in 2020

General information
- Location: Đồng Xuân Ward, Hoàn Kiếm District, Hà Nội; Vietnam
- Line: Hanoi–Đồng Đăng Railway
- Platforms: 1
- Tracks: 1

Construction
- Structure type: Ground
- Platform levels: III

History
- Opened: 1902

Services
Preceding station	Vietnam Railways	Following station
Hanoi Terminus	Hanoi–Dong Dang	Gia Lâm towards Đồng Đăng
Hanoi Terminus	Hanoi–Lao Cai	Gia Lâm towards Lào Cai
Hanoi Terminus	Hanoi–Haiphong	Gia Lâm towards Hai Phong
Hanoi Terminus	Hanoi–Quan Trieu	Gia Lâm towards Quán Triều
Location

Long Biên station is a railway station in Hoàn Kiếm District, Hanoi, Vietnam, at the western end of Long Biên Bridge. It is one of the two main railway stations of Hanoi, the other being the Hanoi central station which mostly serves the north-south route (to Ho Chi Minh City) and the north-west route (to Lao Cai). Long Biên railway station serves destinations to the North and East including Hai Phong and Đồng Đăng.
