= Kép station =

Railway station in Lạng Giang, Vietnam

Coordinates: 21°25′1″N 106°17′27″E

Kep Ga Kép
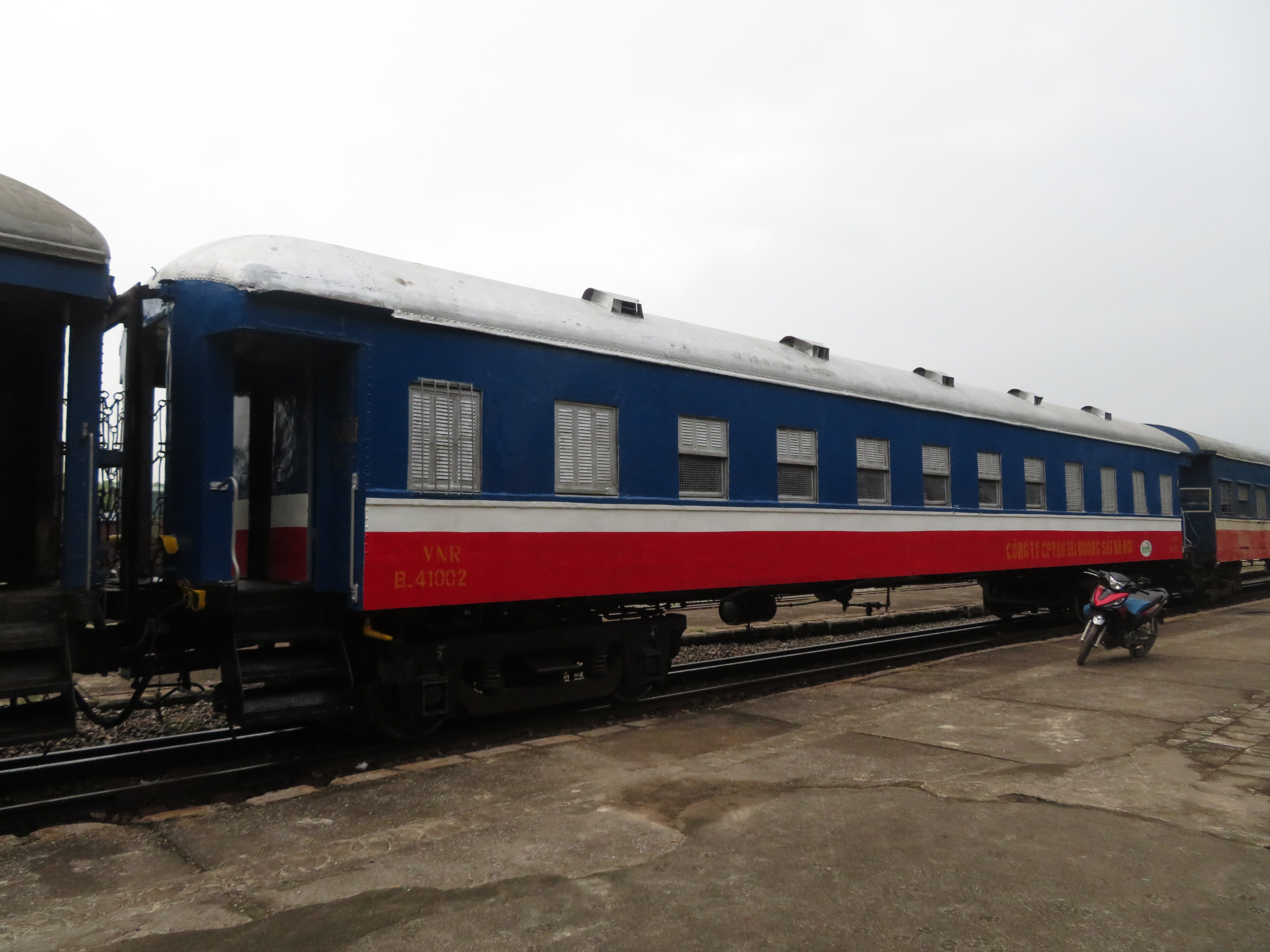

General information
- Location: Kép, Bắc Ninh; Vietnam
- Owner: Vietnam Railways
- Operator: Vietnam Railways
- Line: Hanoi–Đồng Đăng Railway
- Platforms: 1

Construction
- Structure type: Ground

Services
Preceding station	Vietnam Railways	Following station
Bắc Giang towards Hanoi	Hanoi–Dong Dang	Lạng Sơn towards Đồng Đăng
Terminus	Kep–Ha Long	Lan Mẫu towards Hạ Long
Location

Kép station is a railway station in Vietnam. It serves Kép ward in Bắc Ninh city. There is also a branch line to Hạ Long.
