= Yên Viên station =

Railway station in Gia Lâm, Vietnam

Yen Vien Ga Yên Viên
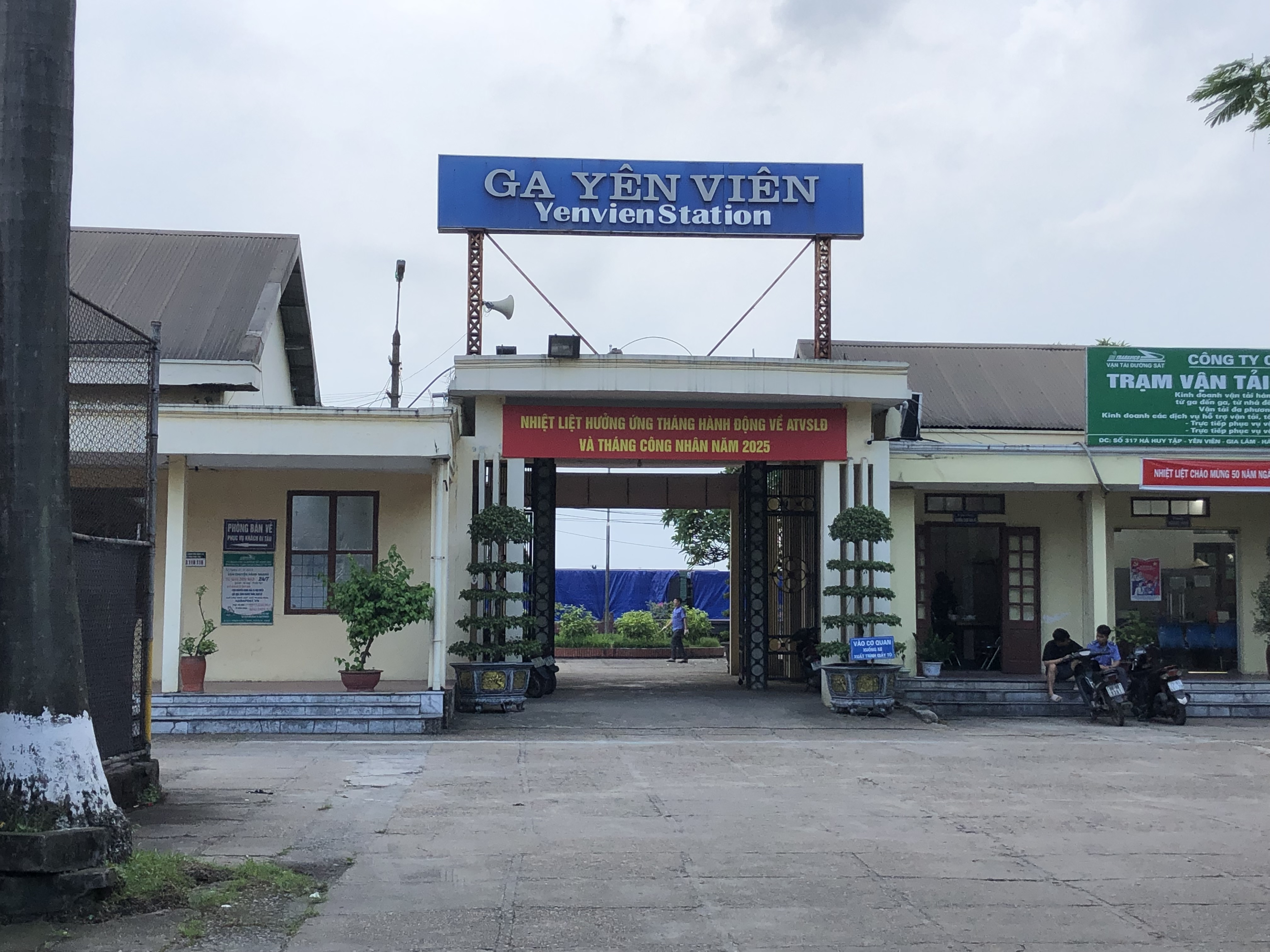

General information
- Location: Gia Lâm, Hà Nội; Vietnam
- Coordinates: 21°05′07″N 105°54′58″E
- Lines: Hanoi–Lào Cai Railway; Hanoi–Đồng Đăng railway Hanoi–Quán Triều railway
Location

Yen Vien station is a railway station in Vietnam. It serves the city of Hanoi.
