= Hương Sơn =

Hương Sơn may refer to:

- Hương Sơn District, Hà Tĩnh Province, Vietnam
- Hương Sơn, Bắc Giang, Vietnam
