= Mạo Khê station =

Railway station in Vietnam

Coordinates: 21°3′45″N 106°36′17″E

Mao Khe Ga Mạo Khê

General information
- Location: Đông Triều, Quảng Ninh Province; Vietnam
- Line: Kep–Ha Long Railway
Location

Mạo Khê station is a railway station in Vietnam. It is located in Đông Triều District in Quảng Ninh Province. It serves the town of Mạo Khê.
