= Phú Thọ station =

Railway station in Phú Thọ, Vietnam

Phu Tho Ga Phú Thọ

General information
- Location: Phú Thọ, Phú Thọ Province; Vietnam
- Coordinates: 21°24′09″N 105°13′27″E
- Line: Hanoi–Lào Cai Railway
Location

Phú Thọ station is a railway station in Vietnam. It serves the town of Phú Thọ, in Phú Thọ Province.
