= Đông Anh station =

Railway station in Đông Anh, Vietnam

Dong Anh Ga Đông Anh
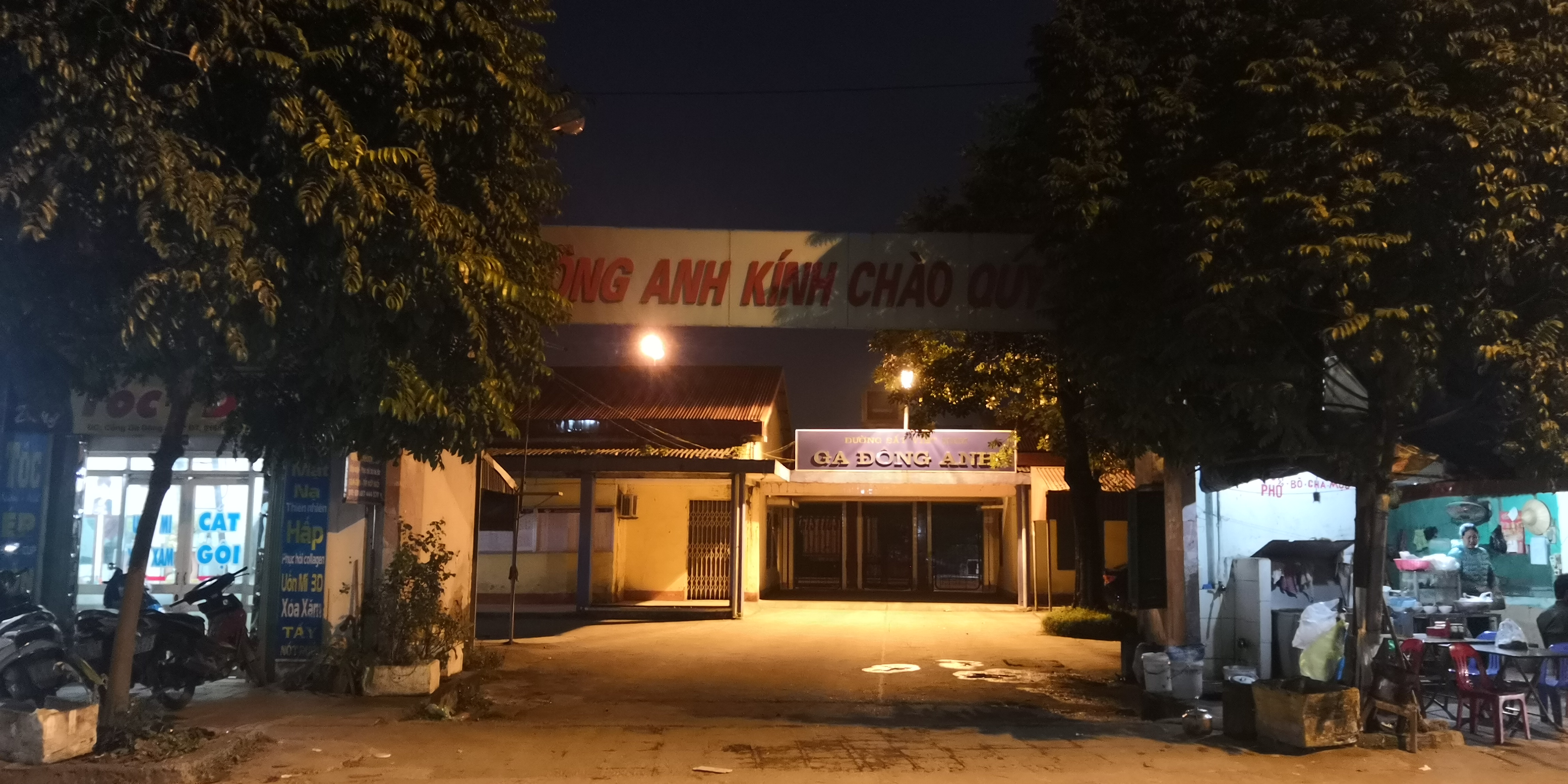

General information
- Location: Đông Anh District, Hanoi; Vietnam
- Coordinates: 21°09′13″N 105°51′06″E
- Lines: Hanoi–Lào Cai Railway; Hanoi–Quan Triều Railway
Location

Đông Anh station is a railway station in Vietnam. It serves the Đông Anh district of Hanoi.

The station was the site of a military hospital for the Lính tập soldiers during the French colonial period.
