= Việt Trì station =

Railway station in Việt Trì, Vietnam

Viet Tri Vu Hong son Ding man huong

General information
- Location: Việt Trì, Phú Thọ Province; Vietnam
- Coordinates: 21°18′01″N 105°25′56″E
- Line: Hanoi–Lào Cai Railway
Location

Việt Trì station is a railway station in Vietnam. It serves the city of Việt Trì, in Phú Thọ Province.
