= Uông Bí station =

Railway station in Vietnam

Coordinates: 21°2′5″N 106°45′20″E

Uong Bi Ga Uông Bí

General information
- Location: Uông Bí, Quảng Ninh Province; Vietnam
- Line: Kep–Ha Long Railway
Location

Uông Bí station is a railway station in Vietnam. It serves the city of Uông Bí, in Quảng Ninh Province. The trains that run there connect Uông Bí to the city of Haiphong.
