= Lưu Xá station =

Railway station in Thái Nguyên, Vietnam

Luu Xa Ga Lưu Xá
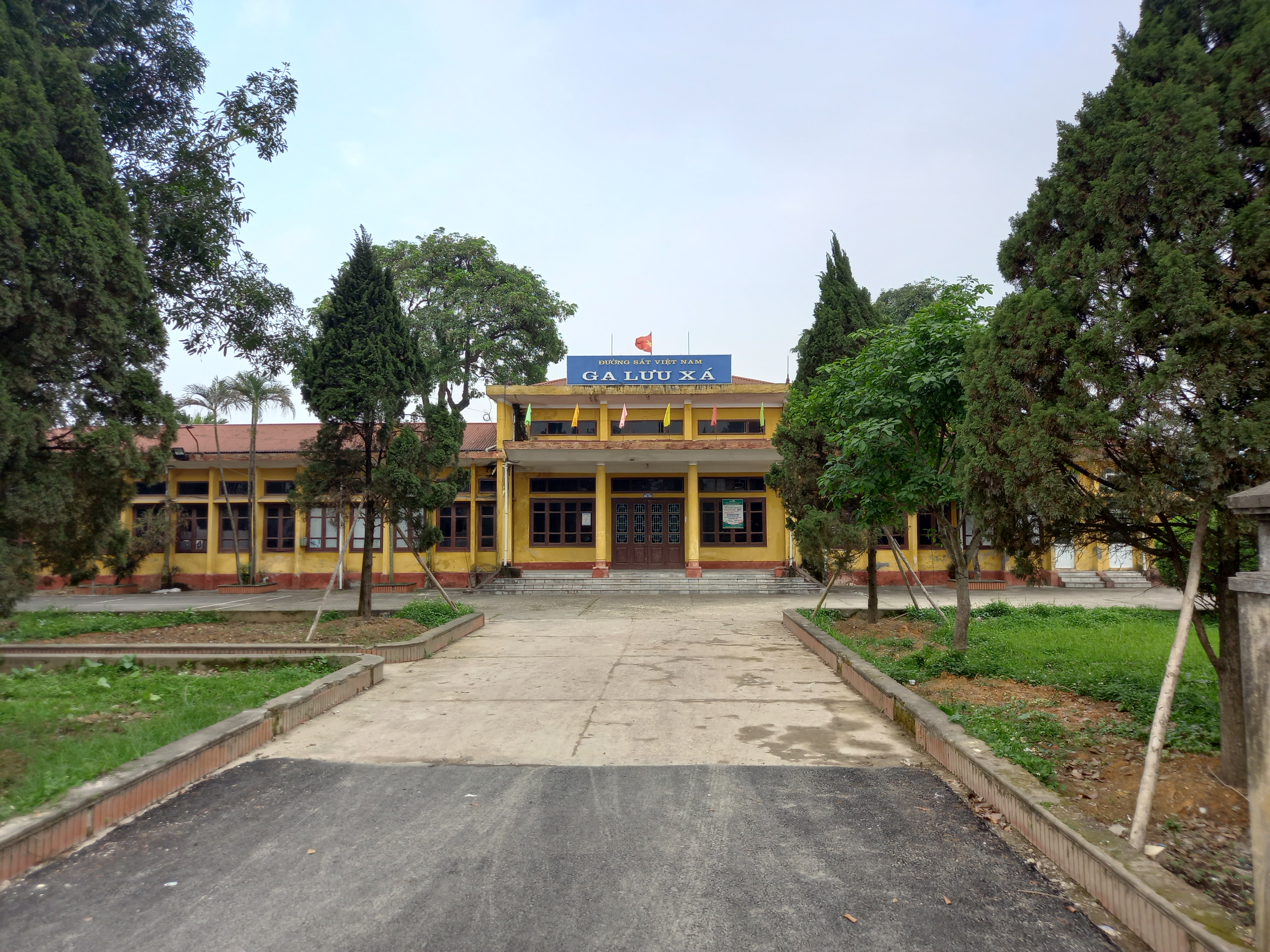

General information
- Location: Thái Nguyên, Thái Nguyên Province; Vietnam
- Coordinates: 21°33′44″N 105°50′48″E
- Line: Hà Nội–Quán Triều Railway
Location

Luu Xa station (Vietnamese: ga Lưu Xá) is a railway station in Vietnam. It serves the area southern of Thái Nguyên city, in Thái Nguyên Province.

== In popular culture ==
The station became the first setting in the movie Red Rain, released in 2025. In the movie, the station was renamed fictionally as Luu Trieu Station.
