= Thái Nguyên station =

Railway station in Thái Nguyên, Vietnam

Thai Nguyen Ga Thái Nguyên
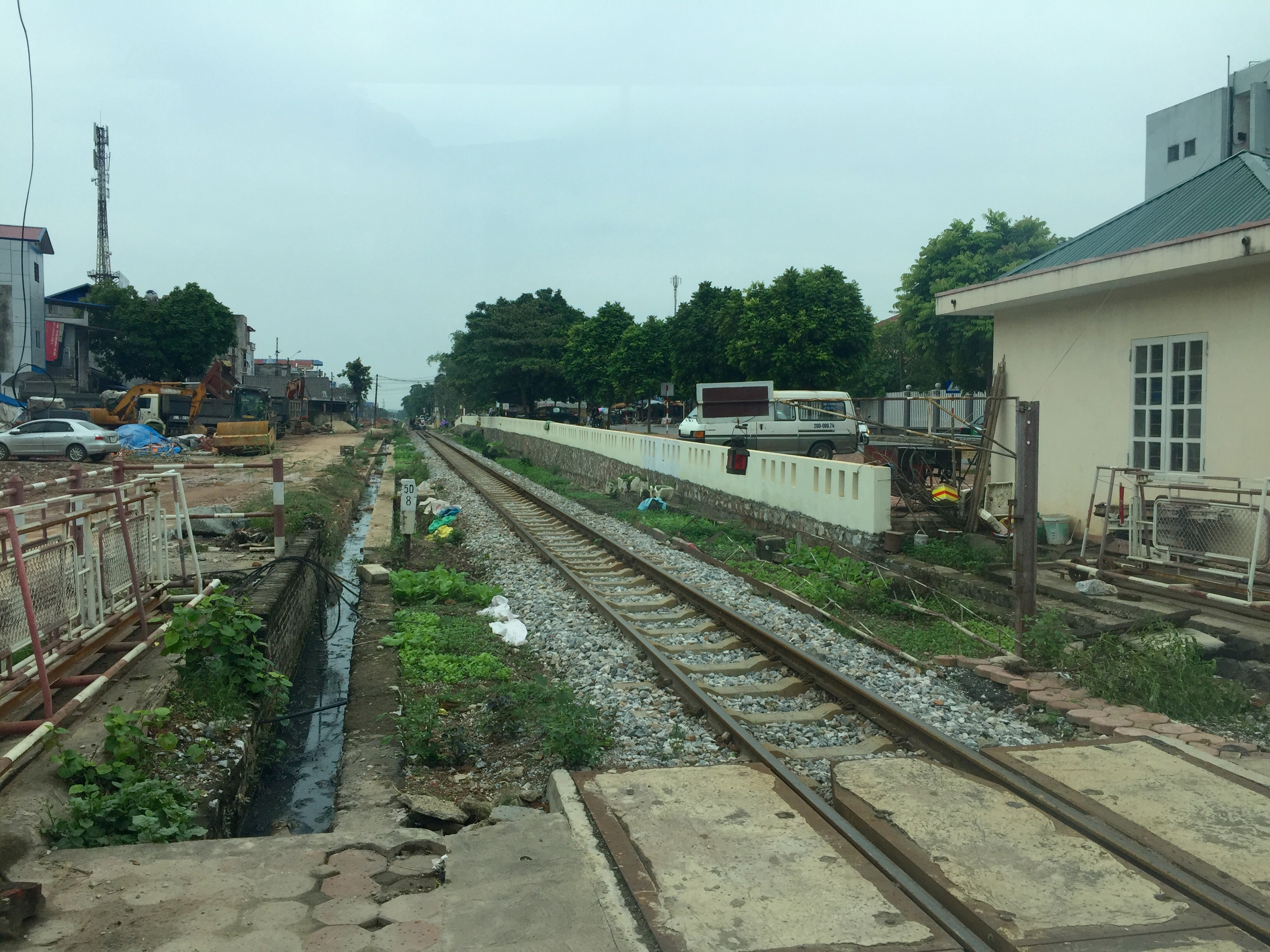

General information
- Location: Thái Nguyên, Thái Nguyên Province; Vietnam
- Coordinates: 21°35′12″N 105°49′25″E
- Line: Hà Nội–Quán Triều Railway
Location

Thái Nguyên station is a railway station in Vietnam. It serves the area center of Thái Nguyên City, in Thái Nguyên Province.
