= Yên Bái station =

Railway station in Yên Bái, Vietnam

Yen Bai Ga Yên Bái

General information
- Location: Yên Bái, Yên Bái Province; Vietnam
- Coordinates: 21°42′8″N 104°52′50″E
- Line: Hanoi–Lào Cai Railway
Location

Yên Bái station is a railway station in Vietnam. It serves the town of Yên Bái, in Yên Bái Province.
