= Phố Lu–Pom Hán railway =

Railway line in Lào Cai province, Vietnam

Phố Lu – Pom Hán railway
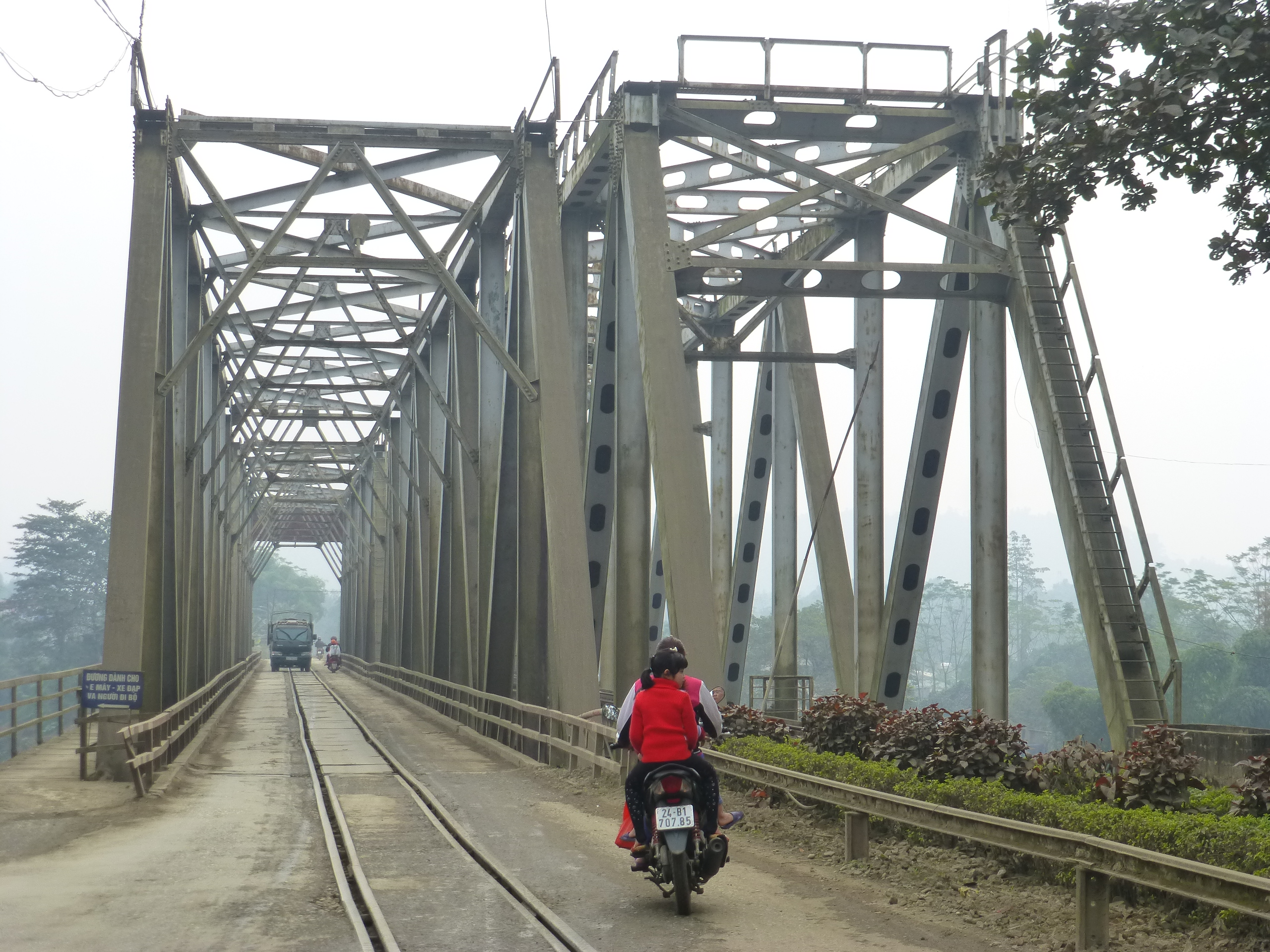
- The combined road-rail bridge on Phố Lu – Pom Hán railway in Bảo Thắng, Lào Cai

Overview
- Native name: Đường sắt Phố Lu – Pom Hán
- Owner: Vietnam Railways
- Termini: Phố Lu station; Pom Hán station

Technical
- Line length: 25 km
- Number of tracks: 1
- Track gauge: 1.000 mm

Phố Lu – Pom Hán railway (Vietnamese: Đường sắt Phố Lu – Pom Hán) is a railway line serving the country of Vietnam in Lào Cai province. It has a total length of 25 km (16 mi) from Phố Lu station in Bảo Thắng, Lào Cai to Pom Hán station at Lào Cai city, Lào Cai. It can connect to Hanoi–Lào Cai railway.
