= Đà Nẵng station =

Railway station in Da Nang, Vietnam

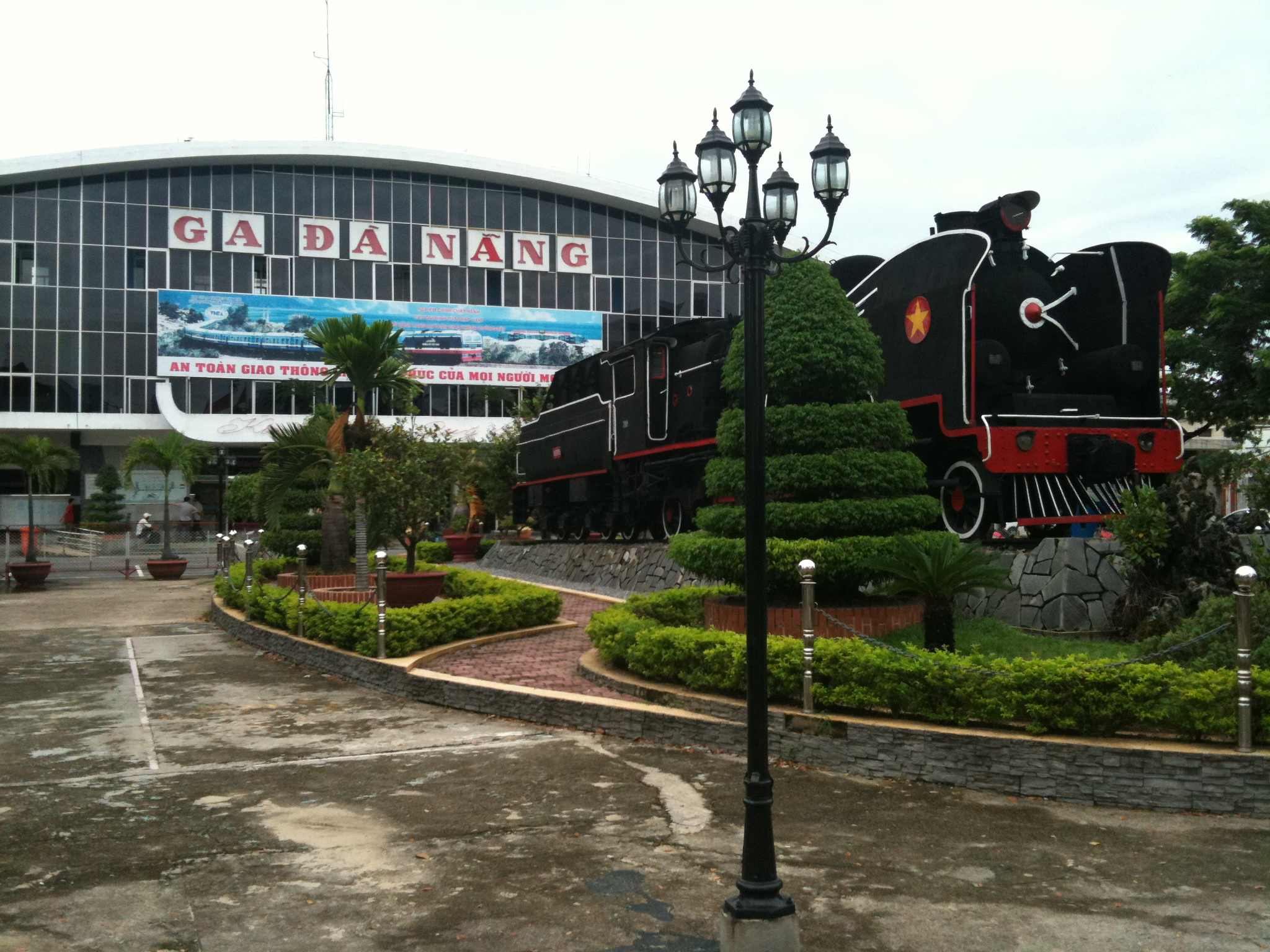

General information
- Location: Đà Nẵng, Hải Châu District; South Central Coast; Vietnam
- Coordinates: 16°4′17.76″N 108°12′33.12″E
- Owner: Vietnam Railways
- Operator: Vietnam Railways
- Platforms: 2
- Tracks: 3
- Connections: Taxi

Construction
- Structure type: Ground
- Parking: Yes
- Cycle facilities: Yes

Services
Preceding station	Vietnam Railways	Following station
Tam Kỳ towards Hanoi	North–South	Thanh Khê towards Saigon
Location

Đà Nẵng station is one of the main railway stations on the North–South Railway (Reunification Express) in Vietnam and one of the five largest stations in Vietnam. It serves the city of Đà Nẵng.

Đà Nẵng station is one of the three largest train stations of Vietnam serving daily trains from the north to the south and vice versa that stop for long enough for a relatively large number of passengers to get on or off. The facilities of Đà Nẵng station are relatively modern, secure and hygienic. Besides North–South routes, the station serves provincial routes such as to Huế, Quảng Bình, Vinh, Quy Nhon, and Ho Chi Minh City. Passengers have diverse options with different classes to any of these stations: odd numbers (E1, S1, S3, S5, S7 and SD1) go from the north to the south coded, even numbers (E2, S2, S4, S6 and S8) go from the south to the north.

== History ==
Đà Nẵng station was opened for the first time in 1902, and has been repaired and rebuilt many times. Due to this, the train station now looks completely different than it did in 1902, and no trace of the old architecture remains.
