= Lạng Sơn station =

Railway station in Lạng Sơn, Vietnam

Lang Son Ga Lạng Sơn
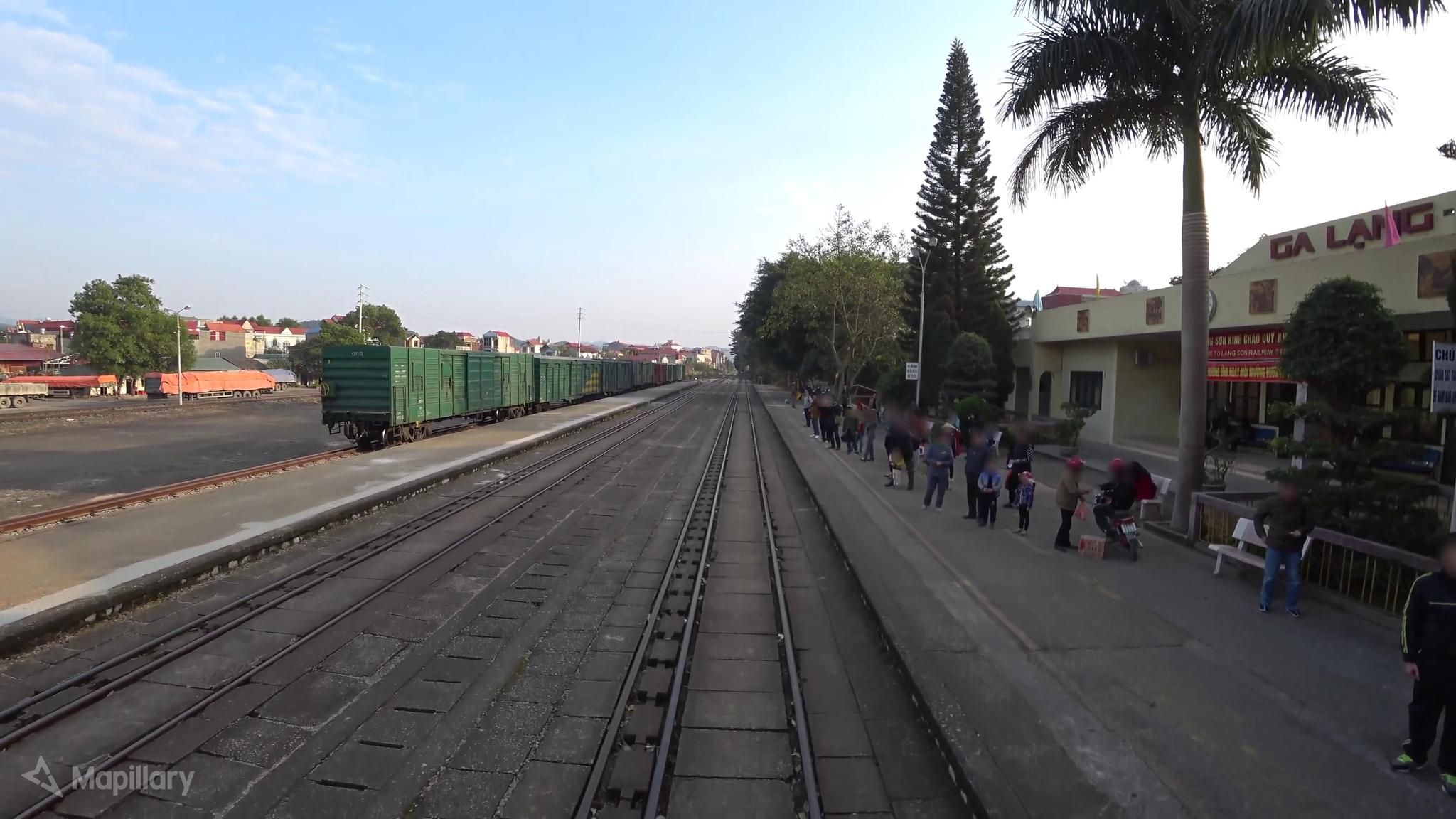

General information
- Location: Lạng Sơn, Lạng Sơn Province; Vietnam
- Coordinates: 21°51′21″N 106°46′08″E
- Line: Hanoi–Đồng Đăng Railway
Location

Lạng Sơn station is a railway station in Vietnam. It serves the town of Lạng Sơn, in Lạng Sơn Province.
