= Quảng Ngãi station =

Railway station in Vietnam

Quảng Ngãi
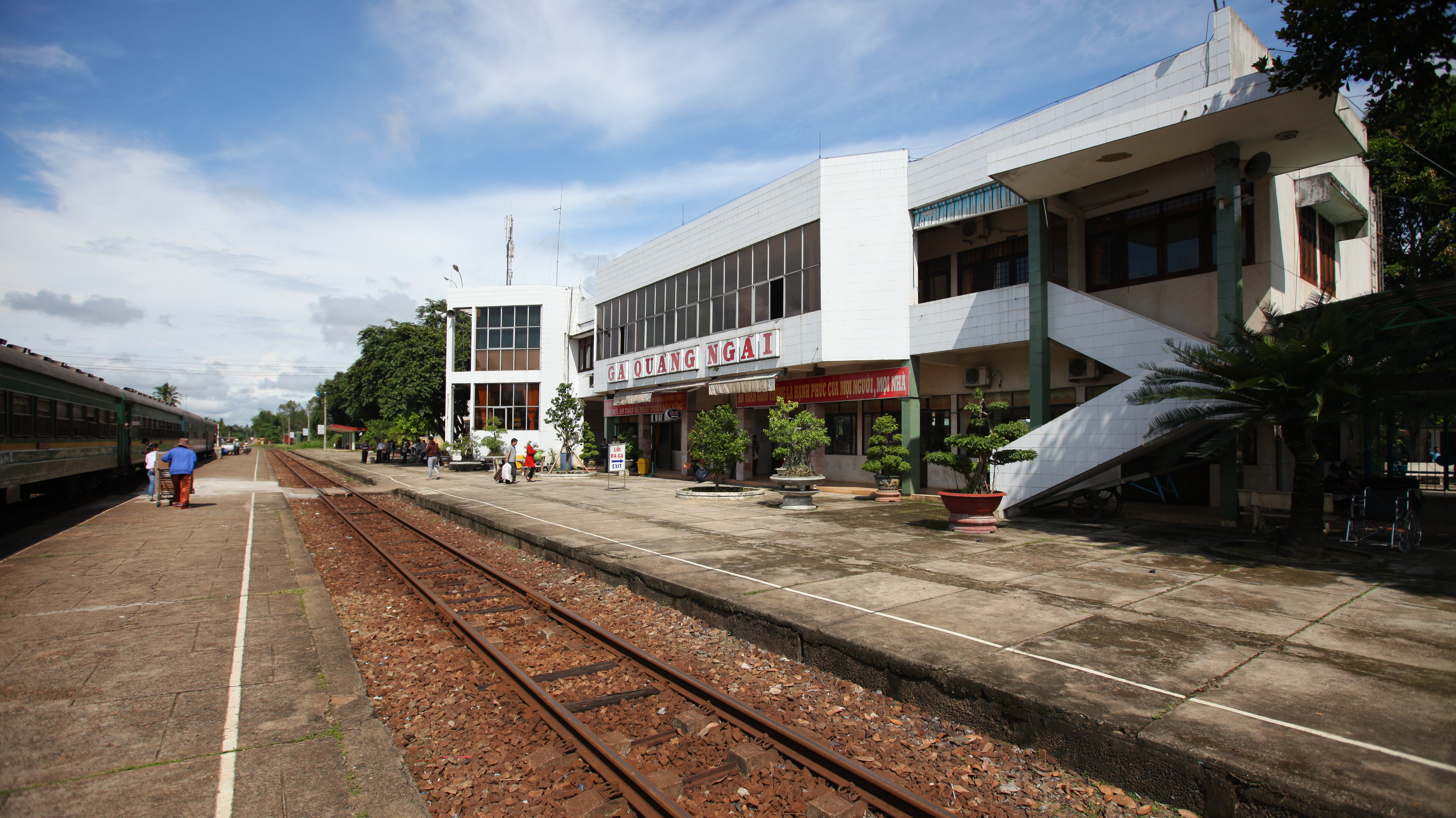

General information
- Location: Vietnam
- Coordinates: 15.1209°N 108.7813°E
Location

Quảng Ngãi station is one of the main railway stations on the North–South railway (Reunification Express) in Vietnam. It serves the city of Quảng Ngãi, lying 1.5 kilometres west of the main centre.
