= Thanh Hóa station =

Railway station in Vietnam

Thanh Hóa
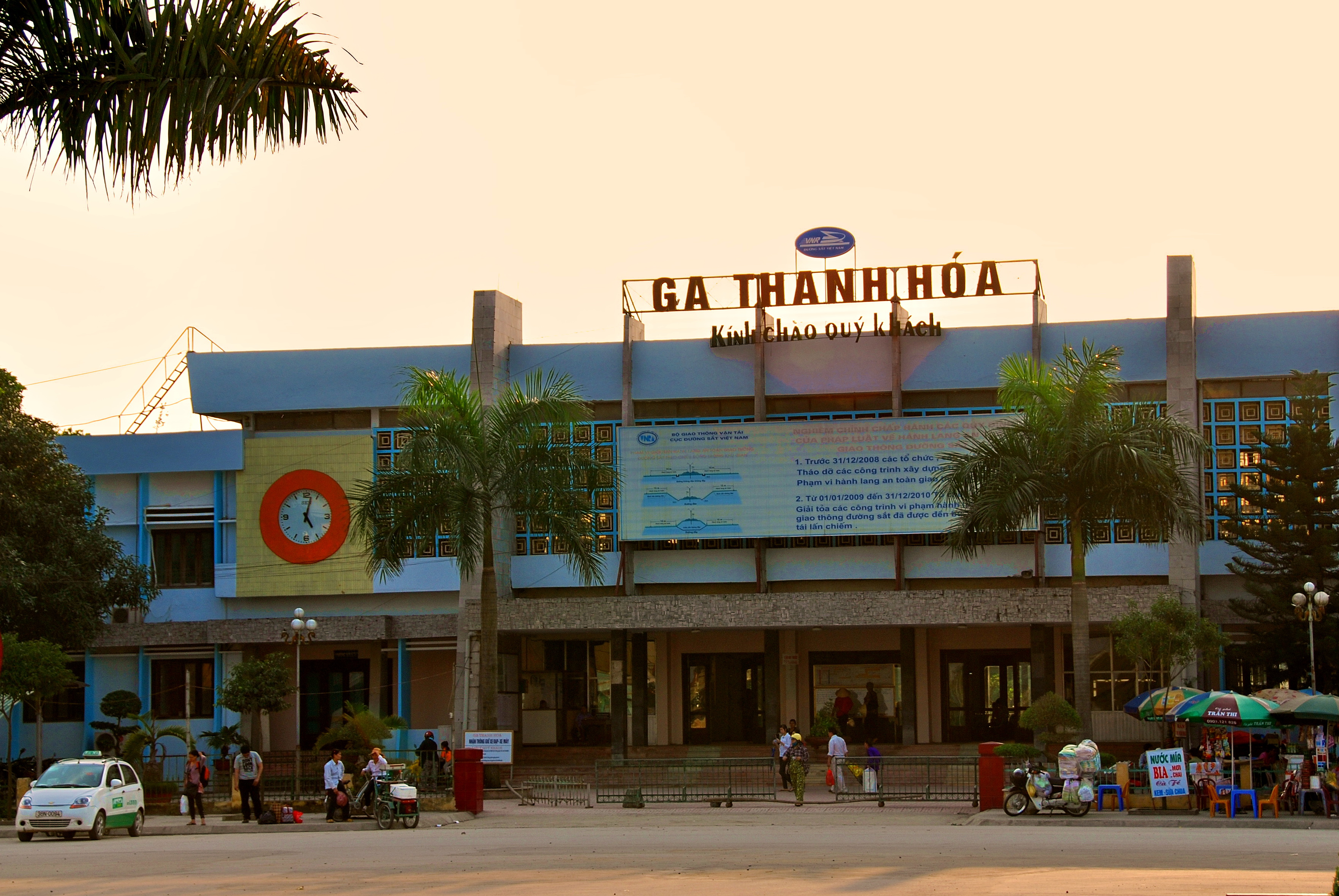

General information
- Location: Vietnam
- Coordinates: 19°48′46″N 105°46′04″E
Location

Thanh Hóa station is one of the main railway stations on the North–South railway (Reunification Express) in Vietnam. It serves the city of Thanh Hóa. It is one of the largest train stations in Vietnam, offering relatively modern facilities compared to other stations in the North. The main storey of the station includes a comfortable waiting room with a capacity of 100 seats, convenient ticket booths, and a shop selling a variety of drinks and snacks.

For travelers heading to Sam Son Beach, the station provides a direct bus service with over 70 trips per day, priced at VND 5,000 (approximately USD 0.25). From Thanh Hóa Station, passengers can travel to major destinations across Vietnam, including Hanoi, Ninh Binh, Hue, Da Nang, Nha Trang, and Ho Chi Minh City.
