= Hải Dương station =

Railway station in Hải Dương, Vietnam

Hai Duong Ga Hải Dương
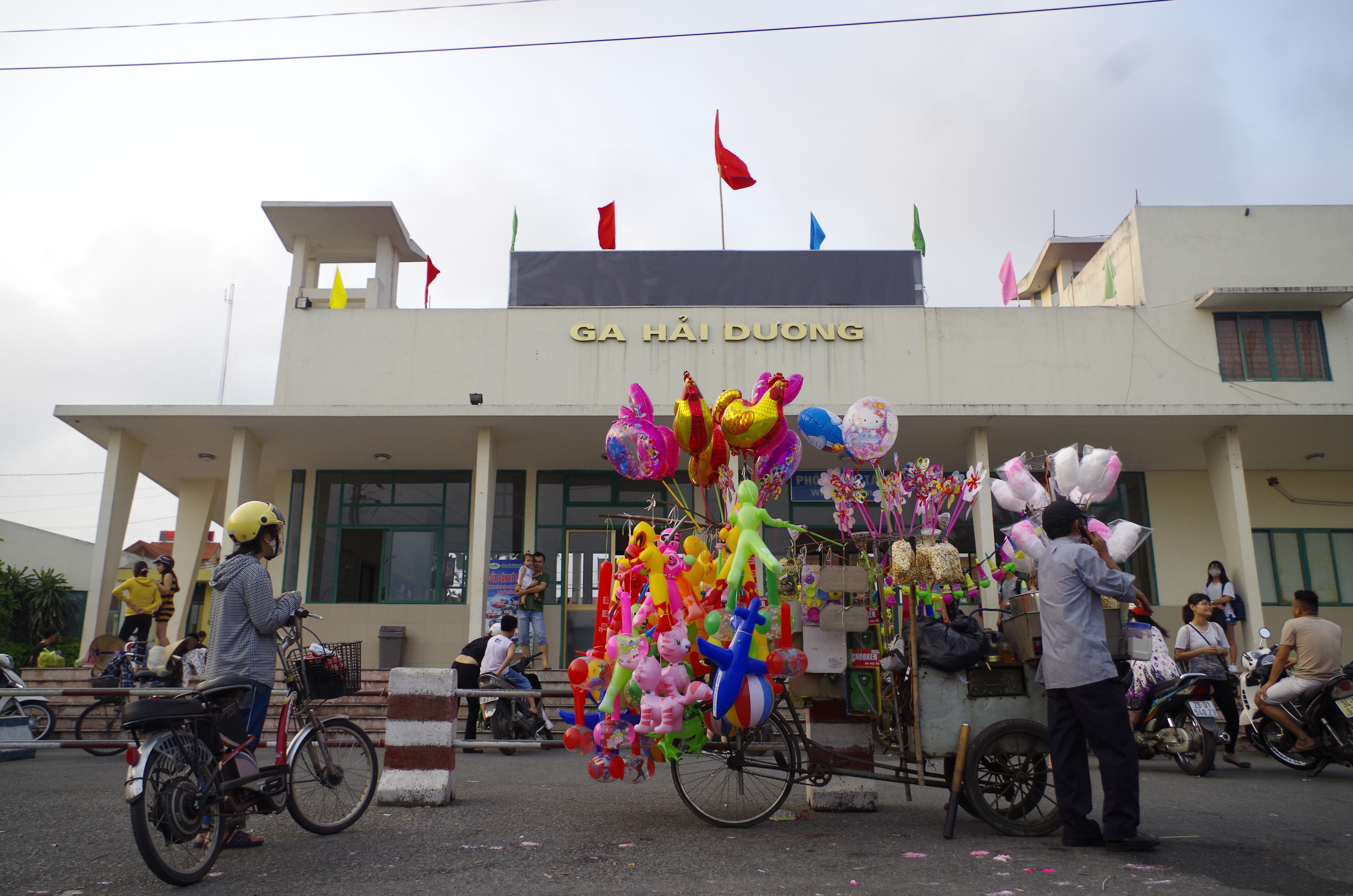

General information
- Location: Hải Dương, Hải Dương Province; Vietnam
- Coordinates: 20°56′50″N 106°19′48″E
- Line: Hanoi–Haiphong Railway
Location

Hải Dương station is a railway station in Vietnam. It serves the town of Hải Dương, in Hải Dương Province.
