= Đông Hà station =

Railway station in Vietnam

Đông Hà

General information
- Location: Vietnam
- Coordinates: 16°48′40″N 107°06′43″E
Location

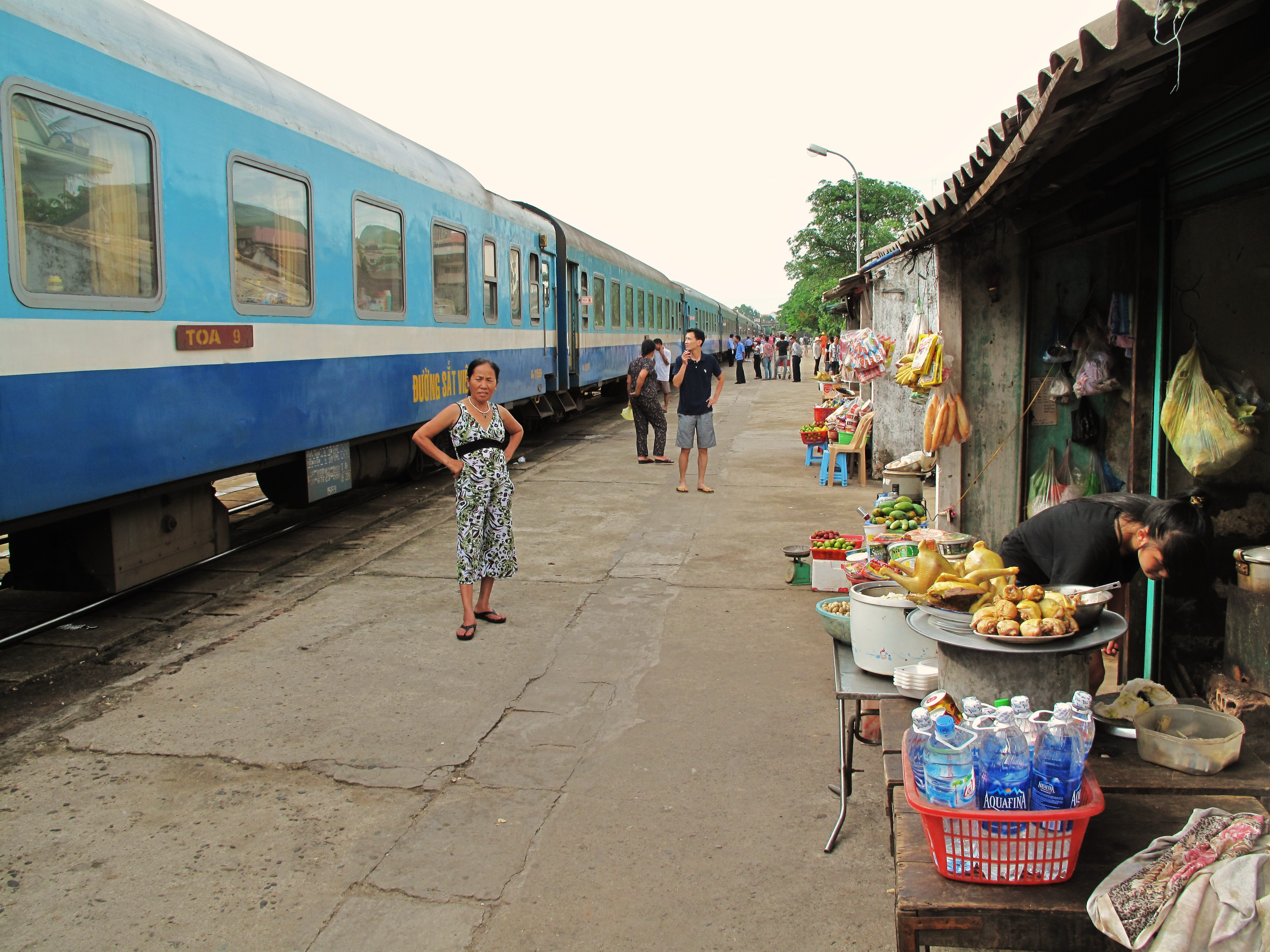
Train stop at Dong Ha, Quang Tri province, Vietnam

Đông Hà station is one of the main railway stations on the North–South railway (Reunification Express) in Vietnam. It serves the city of Đông Hà.
