= Bắc Giang station =

Railway station in Bắc Giang, Vietnam

Coordinates: 21°16′44″N 106°11′29″E

Bac Giang Ga Bắc Giang
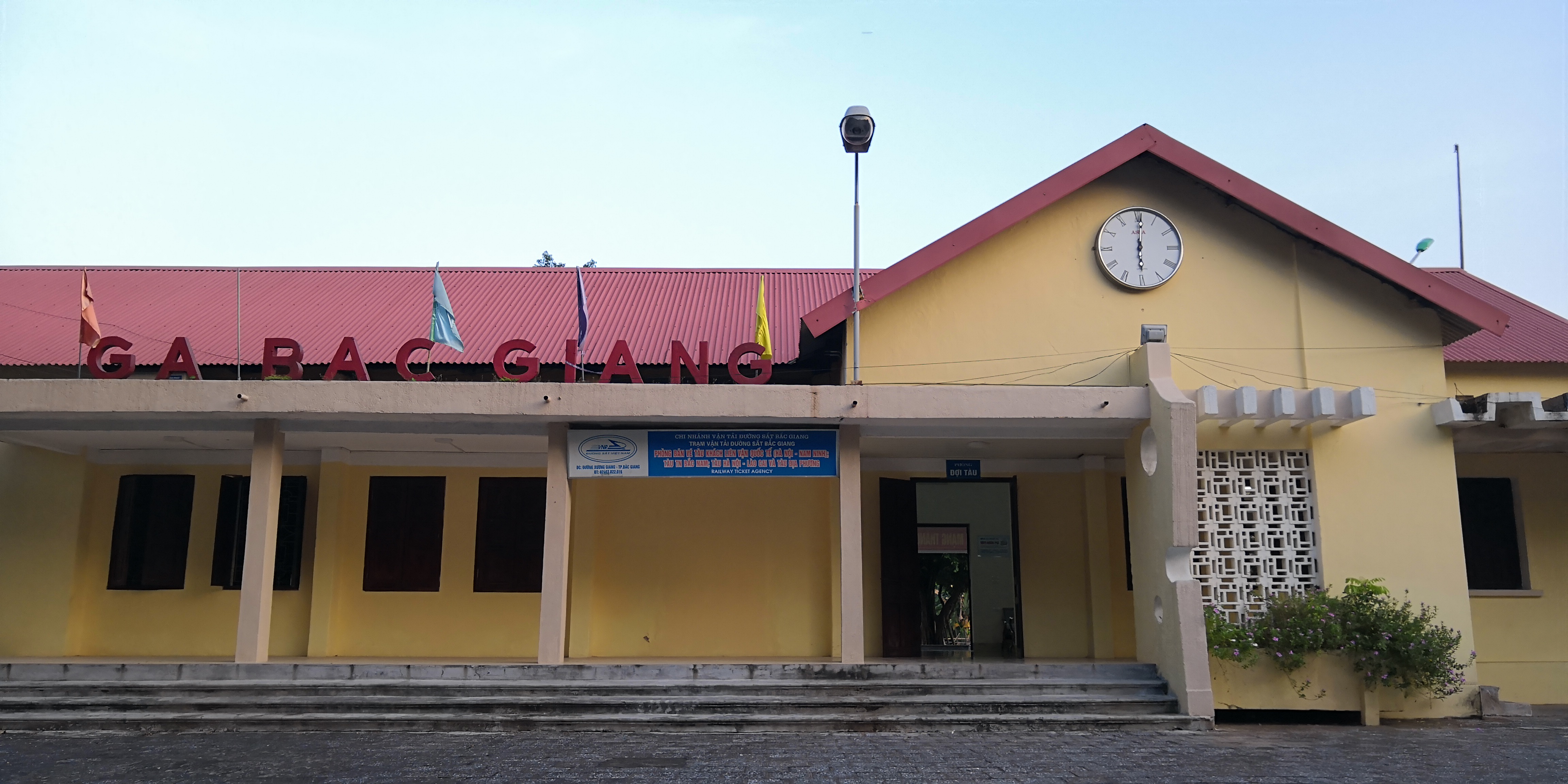

General information
- Location: Bắc Giang, Bắc Giang Province; Vietnam
- Line: Hanoi–Đồng Đăng Railway

Services
Preceding station	Vietnam Railways	Following station
Gia Lâm Terminus	Beijing–Nanning–Hanoi	Đồng Đăng towards Beijing (China)
Location

Bắc Giang station is a railway station in Vietnam. It serves the town of Bắc Giang, in Bắc Giang Province.
