= Lan Mẫu station =

Railway station in Vietnam

Coordinates: 21°17′25″N 106°20′15″E

Lan Mau Ga Lan Mẫu

General information
- Location: Lan Mẫu, Lục Nam, Bắc Giang Province; Vietnam
- Line: Kep–Ha Long Railway
Location

Lan Mẫu station is a railway station in Vietnam. It serves the town of Lan Mẫu, in Bắc Giang Province.
