= Cầu Giát – Nghĩa Đàn railway =

Railway line in Nghệ An province, Vietnam

Overview
- Native name: Đường sắt Cầu Giát – Nghĩa Đàn
- Owner: Vietnam Railways
- Termini: Cầu Giát station; Nghĩa Đàn station

Technical
- Line length: 30.5 km
- Track gauge: 1000 mm

Cầu Giát – Nghĩa Đàn railway is a railway line in Nghệ An province, Vietnam. It has a total length of 30.5 km from Cầu Giát station, Quỳnh Lưu to Nghĩa Đàn station, Nghĩa Đàn. It was built in 1966. This railway line can connect to North–South railway. Currently, the Cầu Giát – Nghĩa Đàn railway has stopped operating for passenger train since 2006 and freight train in 2012.
