= Trại Mát station =

Railway station in Vietnam

Ga Trại Mát
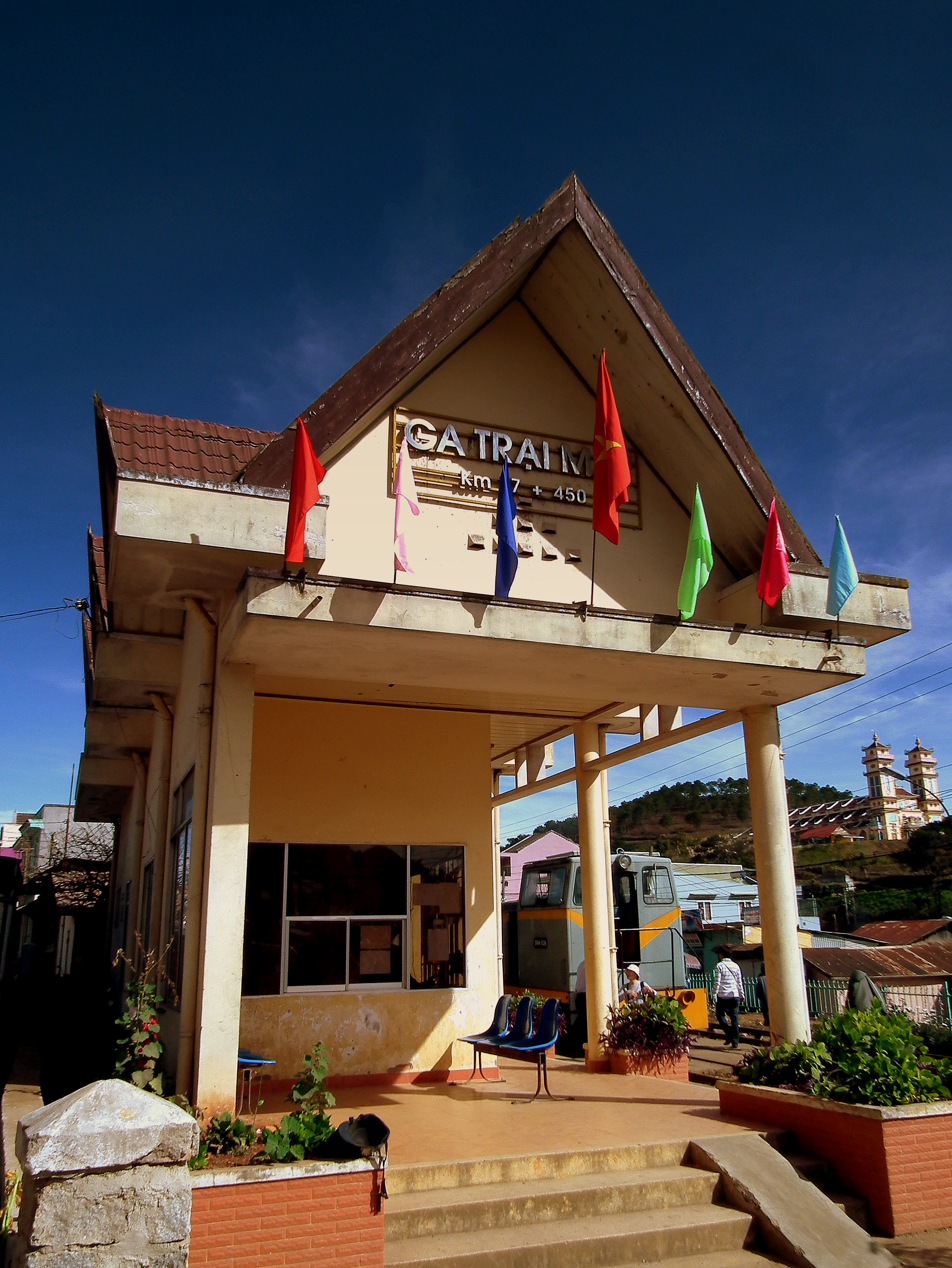

General information
- Location: Da Lat, Lâm Đồng province Vietnam
- Coordinates: 11°56′46″N 108°30′5″E
- Line: Đà Lạt–Tháp Chàm railway

History
- Closed: Đang hoạt động
Location

Trại Mát station is a railway station in Vietnam on Đà Lạt–Tháp Chàm railway in Đà Lạt, Lâm Đồng.
