= Kép =

- Ward
- Location in Vietnam
- Coordinates: 21°23′59″N 106°16′0″E
- Country: Vietnam
- City: Bắc Ninh
- Time zone: UTC+07:00

Kép is a ward (phường) of Bắc Ninh city, in north-eastern Vietnam. It is the location of the Kép Railway Station.
