= Hạ Long station =

Railway station in Vietnam

Ha Long Ga Hạ Long
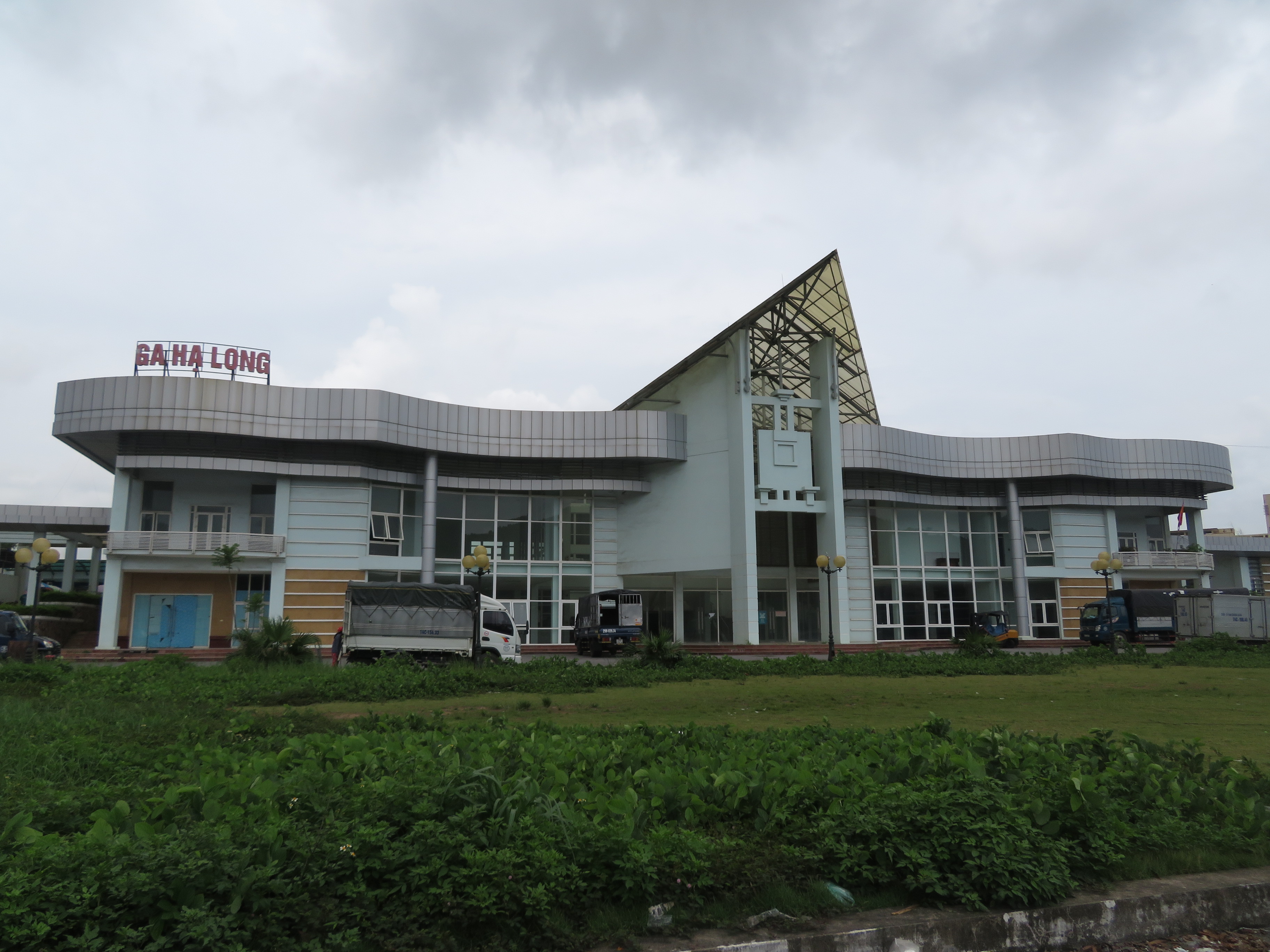

General information
- Location: Hạ Long, Quảng Ninh; Vietnam
- Coordinates: 20°58′28″N 107°00′37″E
- Line: Kep–Ha Long Railway
Location

Hạ Long station is a railway station in Vietnam. It serves the ward of Hạ Long, in Quảng Ninh. It's located in Giếng Đáy, Quảng Ninh.
