= Haiphong station =

Railway station in Haiphong, Vietnam

Hai Phong Ga Hải Phòng
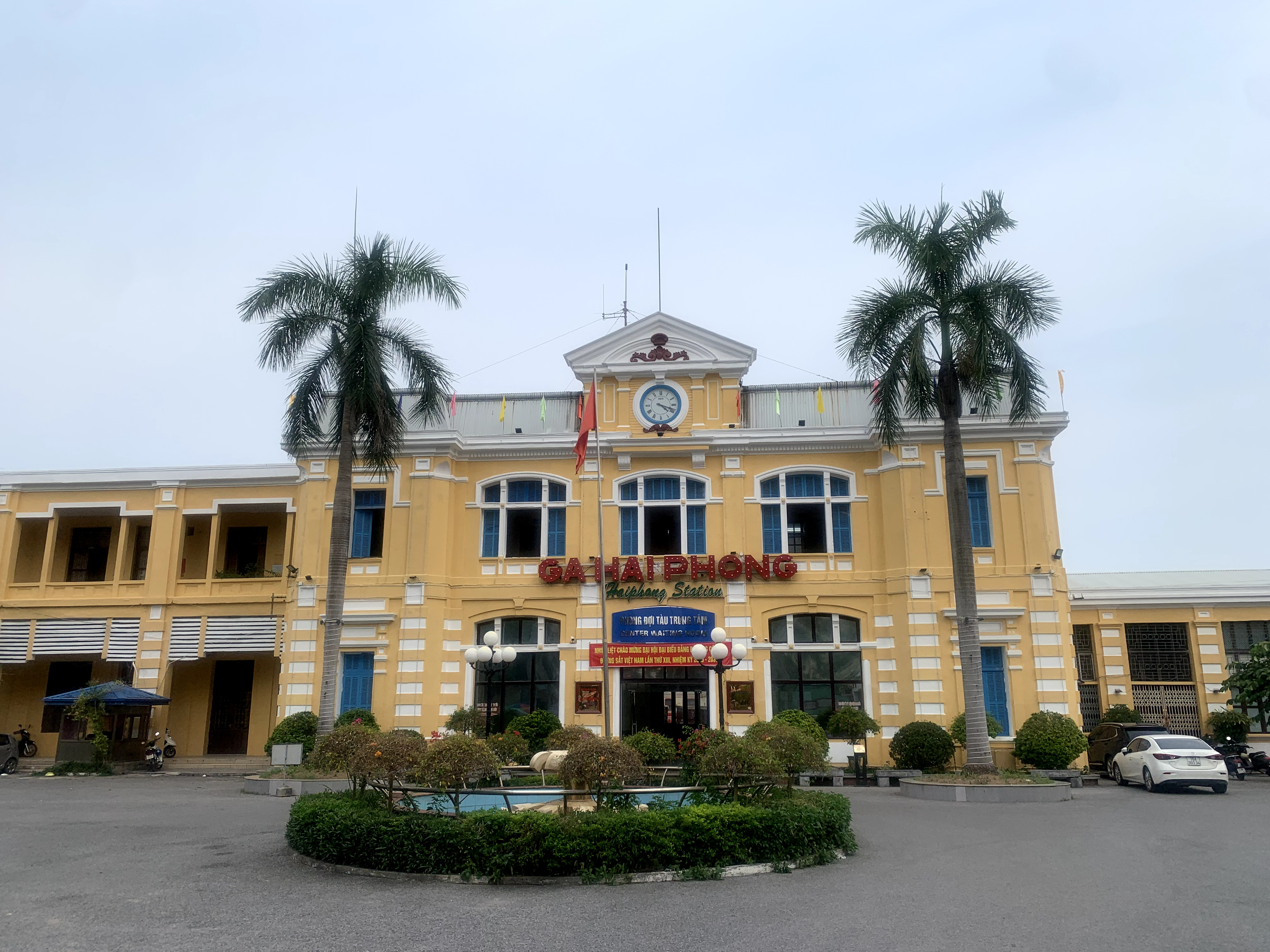

General information
- Location: Ngô Quyền District, Hải Phòng; Vietnam
- Coordinates: 20.8560°N 106.6875°E
- Owner: Vietnam Railways
- Operator: Vietnam Railways
- Platforms: 2
- Tracks: 2

Construction
- Structure type: Concrete building
- Parking: Yes

History
- Opened: 1902

Services
Preceding station	Vietnam Railways	Following station
Hải Dương towards Hanoi	Hanoi–Haiphong Part of Kunming–Haiphong railway	Terminus
Location

Hải Phòng station is one of the main railway stations on the Hanoi–Hai Phong railway in Vietnam. It serves the city of Hai Phong and opened in 1902. It is a terminus of the Sino-Vietnamese Railway, a French engineered narrow gauge railway completed in 1910, which was the first railway line to the Chinese city of Kunming.
