= Kép–Hạ Long railway =

Railway line in Vietnam

Overview
- Owner: Vietnam Railways
- Locale: Vietnam
- Termini: Kép station; Hạ Long station
- Website: www.vr.com.vn/en

Service
- Type: Heavy rail

History
- Opened: 1950s

Technical
- Line length: 106 km (66 mi)
- Track gauge: 1,435 mm (4 ft 8 1/2 in)

Kép–Hạ Long railway (Vietnamese: Đường sắt Kép–Hạ Long) is the railway line serving the country of Vietnam. It is a single-track standard-gauge line connecting from Kép to Hạ Long, Quảng Ninh, for a total length of 106 km (66 mi).

== See also ==
- List of railway lines in Vietnam
