= Hanoi–Haiphong railway =

Railway line in Vietnam

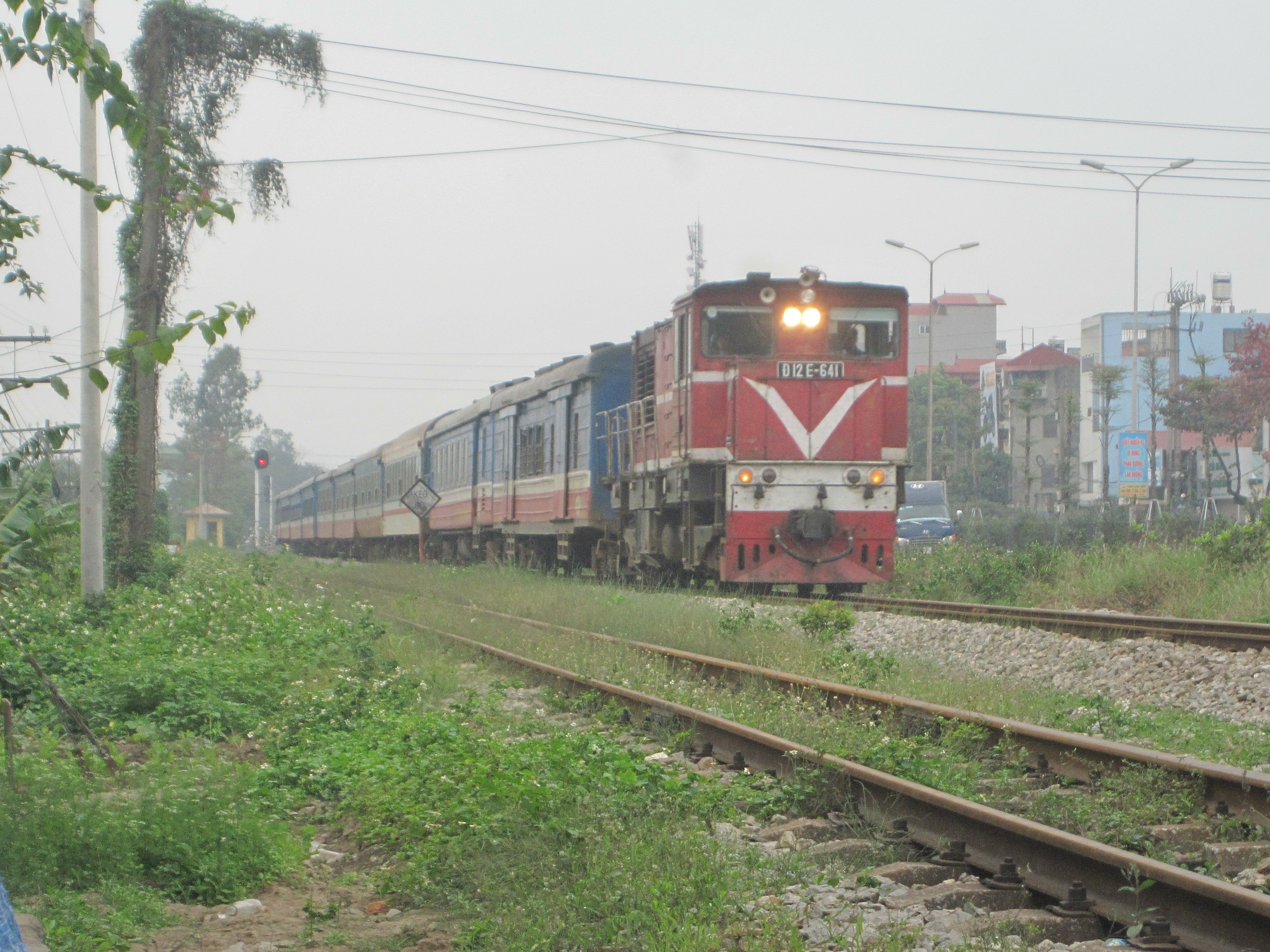
- A train on Hanoi-Haiphong railway

Overview
- Owner: Vietnam Railways
- Locale: Vietnam
- Termini: Hanoi Railway Station; Haiphong Railway Station
- Website: http://www.vr.com.vn/en

Service
- Type: Heavy rail

History
- Opened: 1902

Technical
- Line length: 102 km (63 mi)
- Track gauge: 1,000 mm (3 ft 3 3/8 in)

The Hanoi–Haiphong railway (Vietnamese: Đường sắt Hà Nội–Hải Phòng) is a railway line serving the country of Vietnam. It is a single-track metre-gauge line connecting from Hanoi to Haiphong, for a total length of 102 km (63 mi).

== See also ==
- List of railway lines in Vietnam
- Kunming–Haiphong railway
