= Quán Triều station =

Railway station in Thái Nguyên, Vietnam

Quan Trieu Ga Quán Triều

General information
- Location: Thái Nguyên, Thái Nguyên Province; Vietnam
- Coordinates: 21°36′13″N 105°48′11″E
- Line: Hà Nội–Quán Triều Railway
Location

Quan Trieu station is a railway station in Vietnam. It serves the area northern of Thái Nguyên City, in Thái Nguyên Province.
