= Hanoi–Quán Triều railway =

Railway line in Vietnam

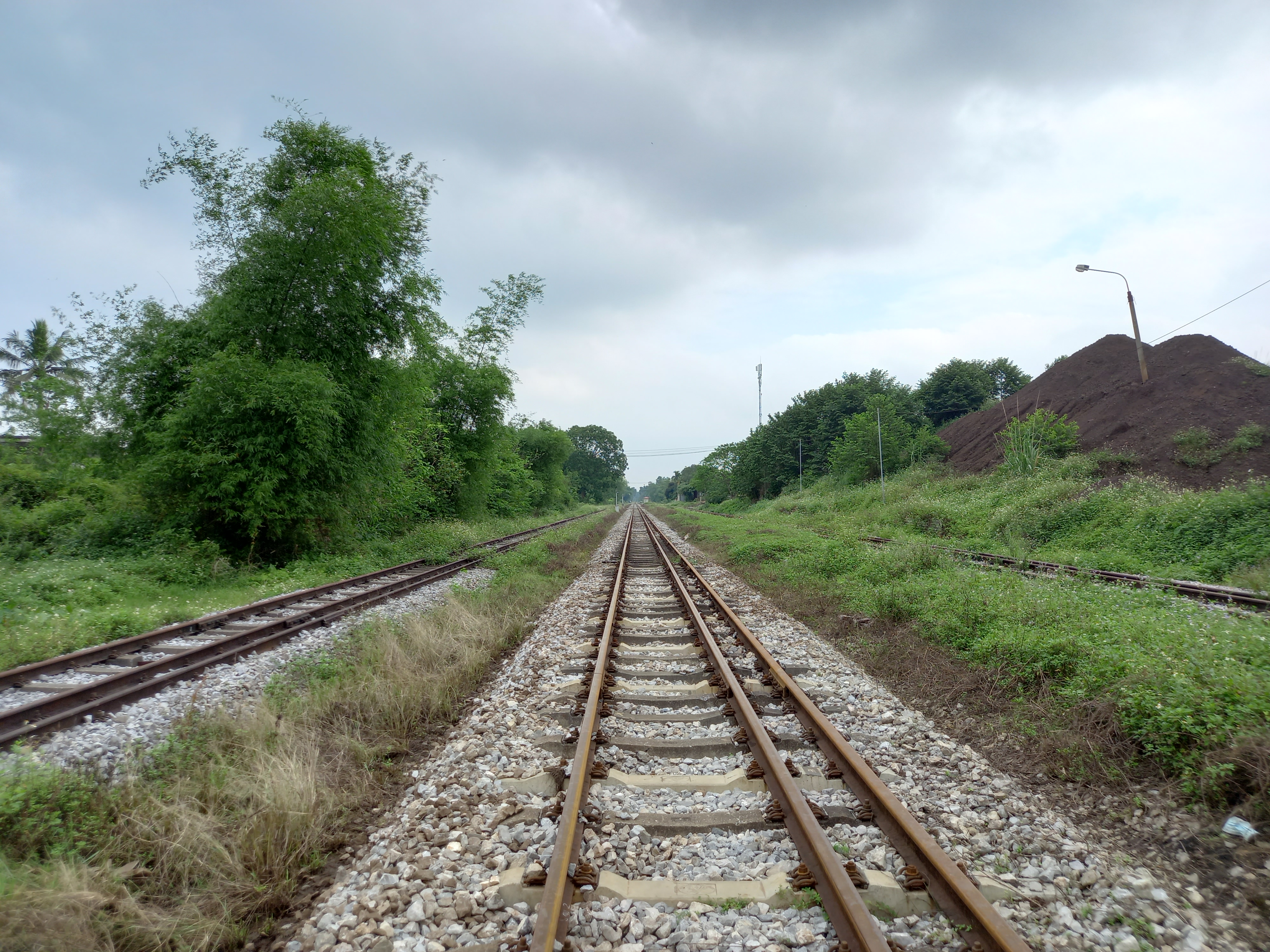
- Hanoi–Quán Triều railway (dual gauge)

Overview
- Owner: Vietnam Railways
- Locale: Vietnam
- Termini: Hanoi station; Quán Triều station
- Website: http://www.vr.com.vn/en

Service
- Type: Heavy rail

History
- Opened: 1962

Technical
- Line length: 120 km (75 mi)
- Track gauge: 1,435 mm (4 ft 8 1/2 in); 1,000 mm (3 ft 3 3/8 in)

The Hanoi–Quán Triều railway (Vietnamese: Đường sắt Hà Nội–Quán Triều) is a railway line serving the country of Vietnam. It is a single-track standard-gauge and metre-gauge line connecting from Hanoi to Thái Nguyên, for a total length of 120 km (75 mi).

== Gallery ==
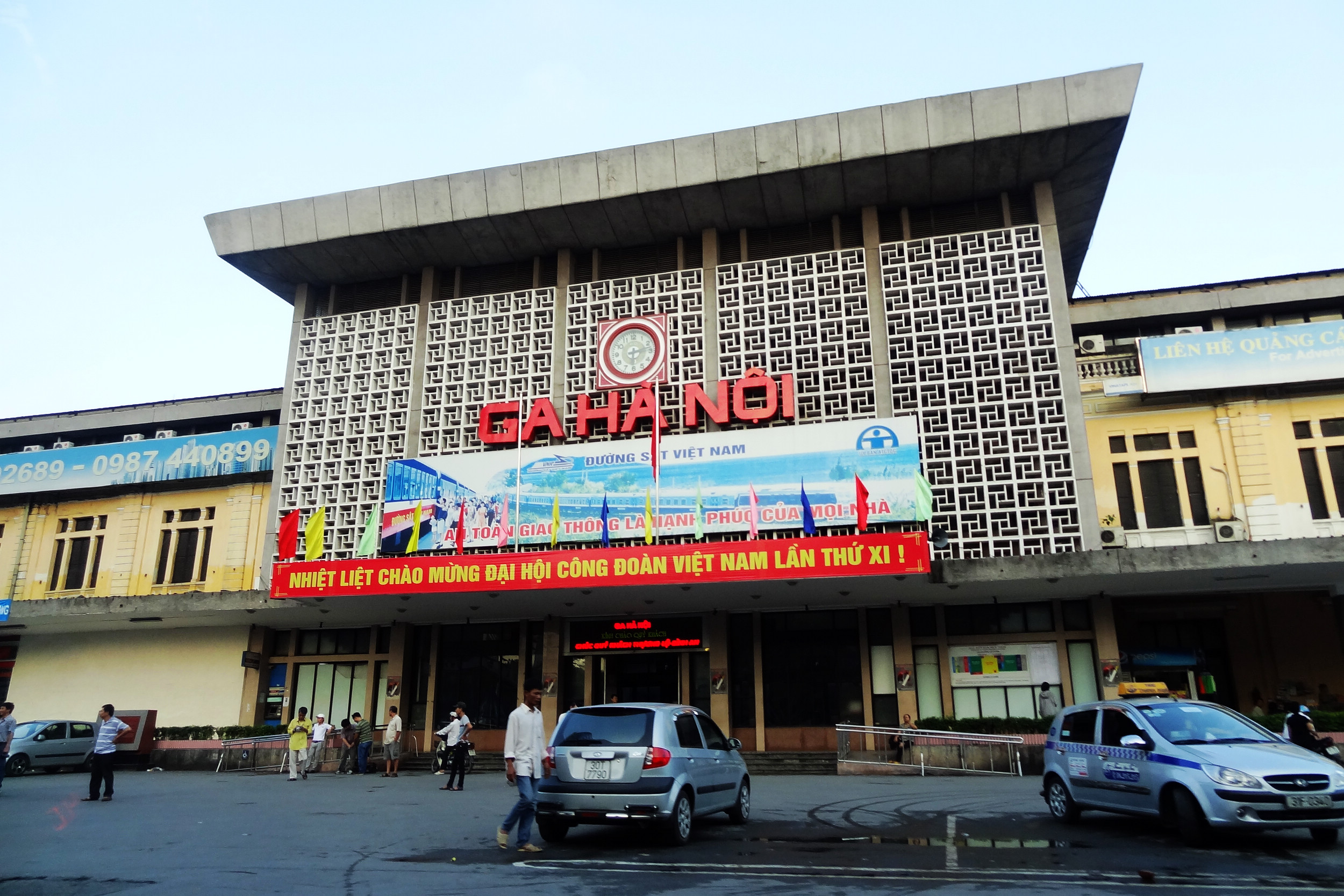
Hanoi station

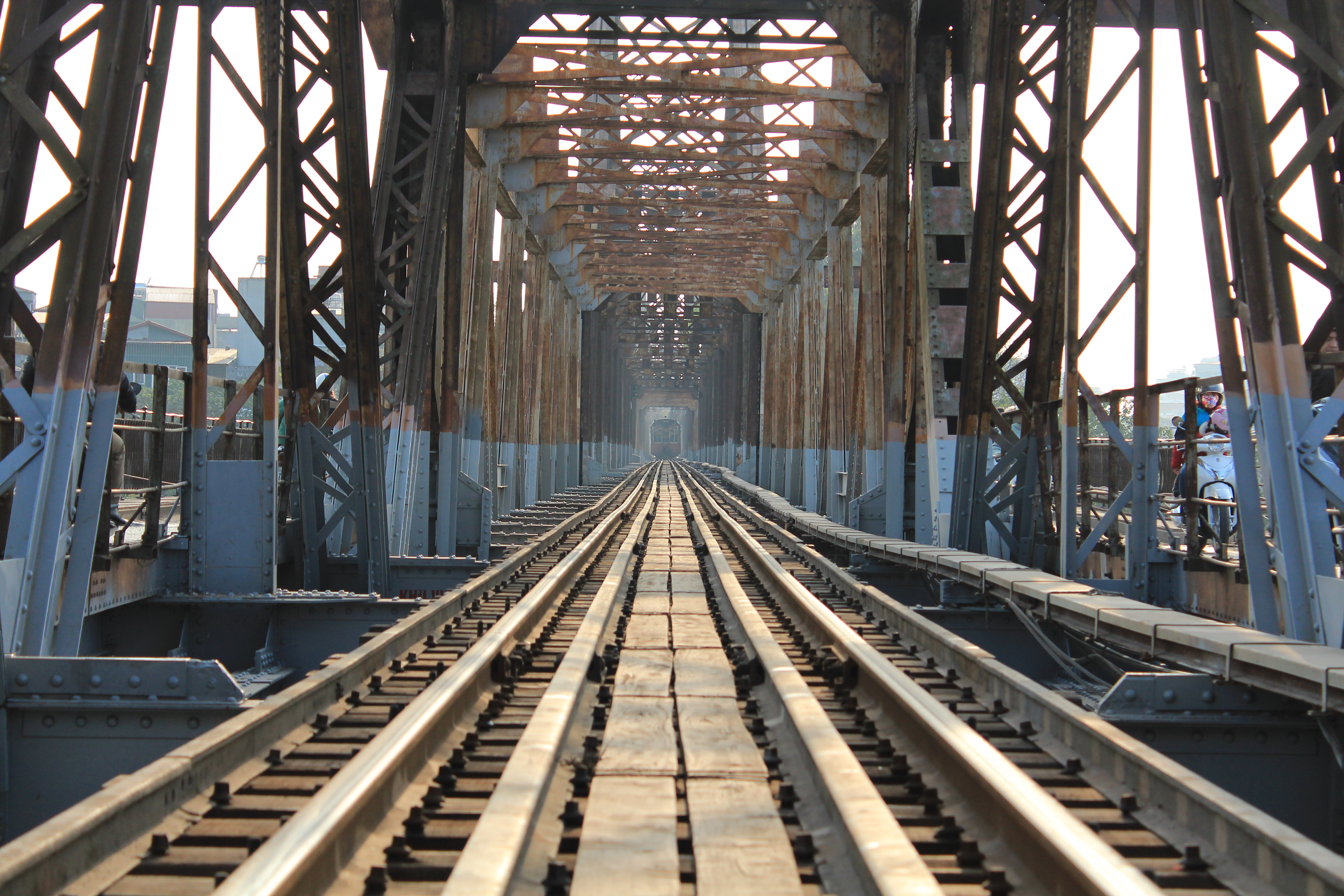
Long-Biên-Bridge

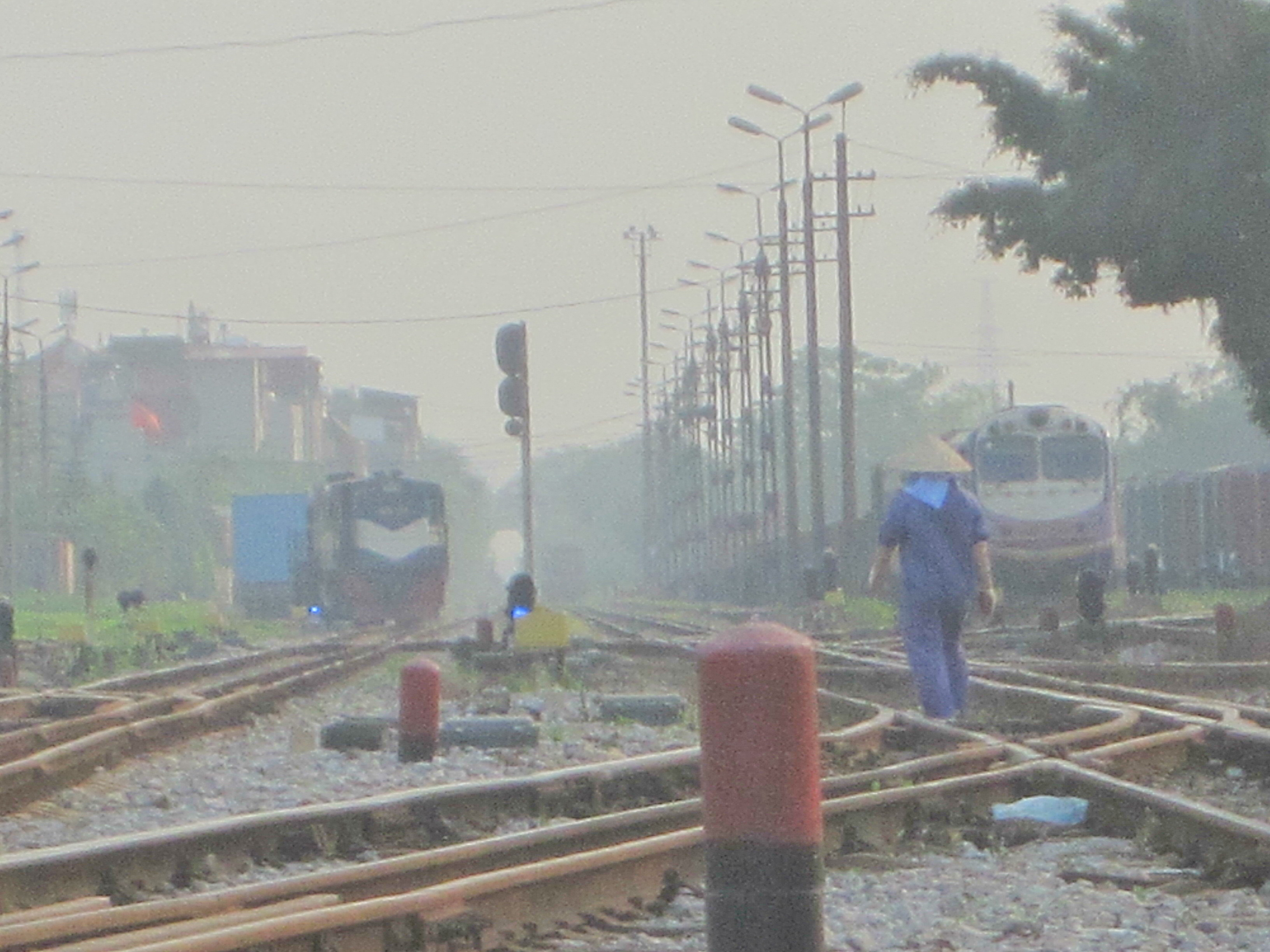
Yên Viên station

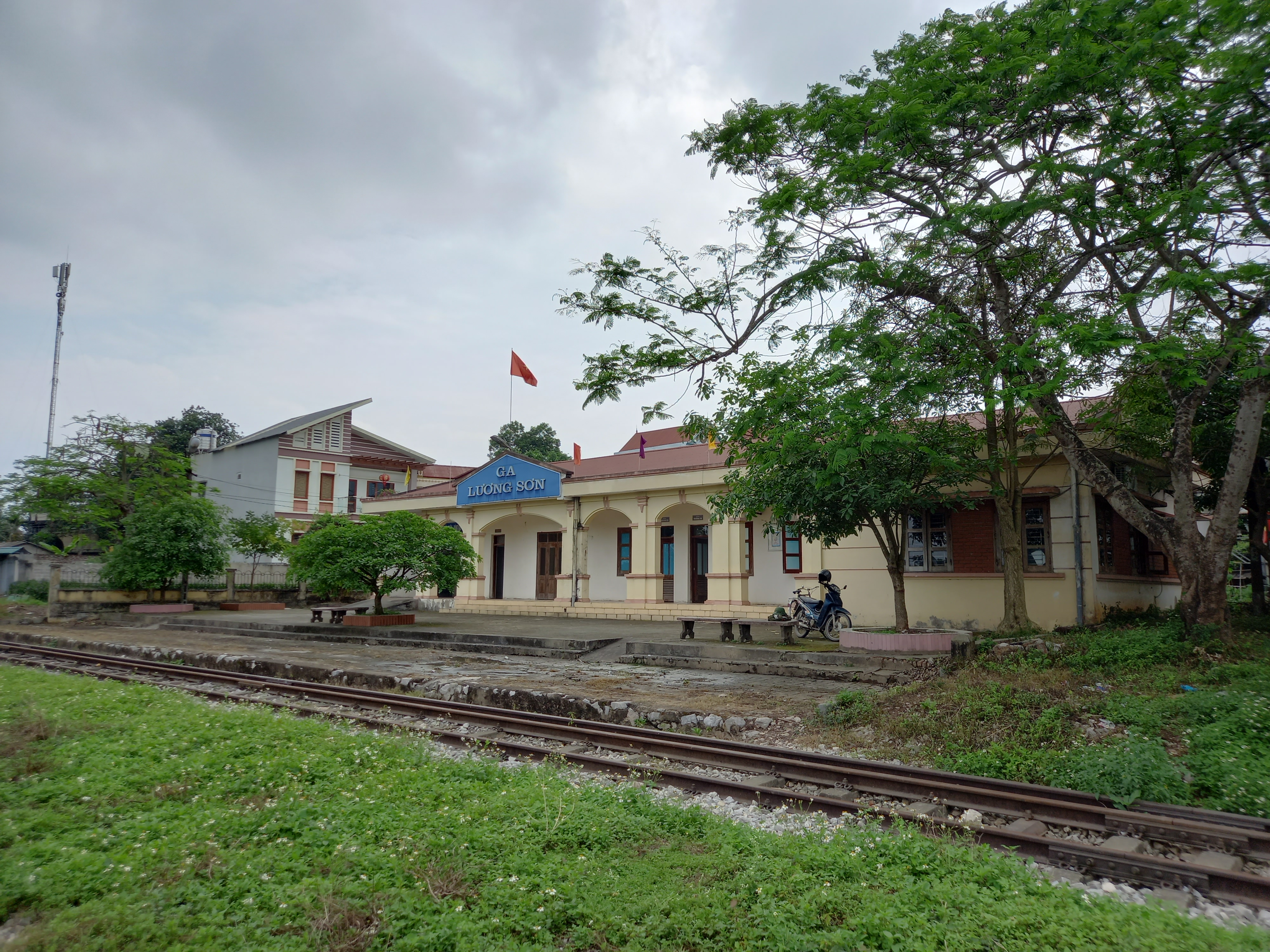
Lương Sơn station

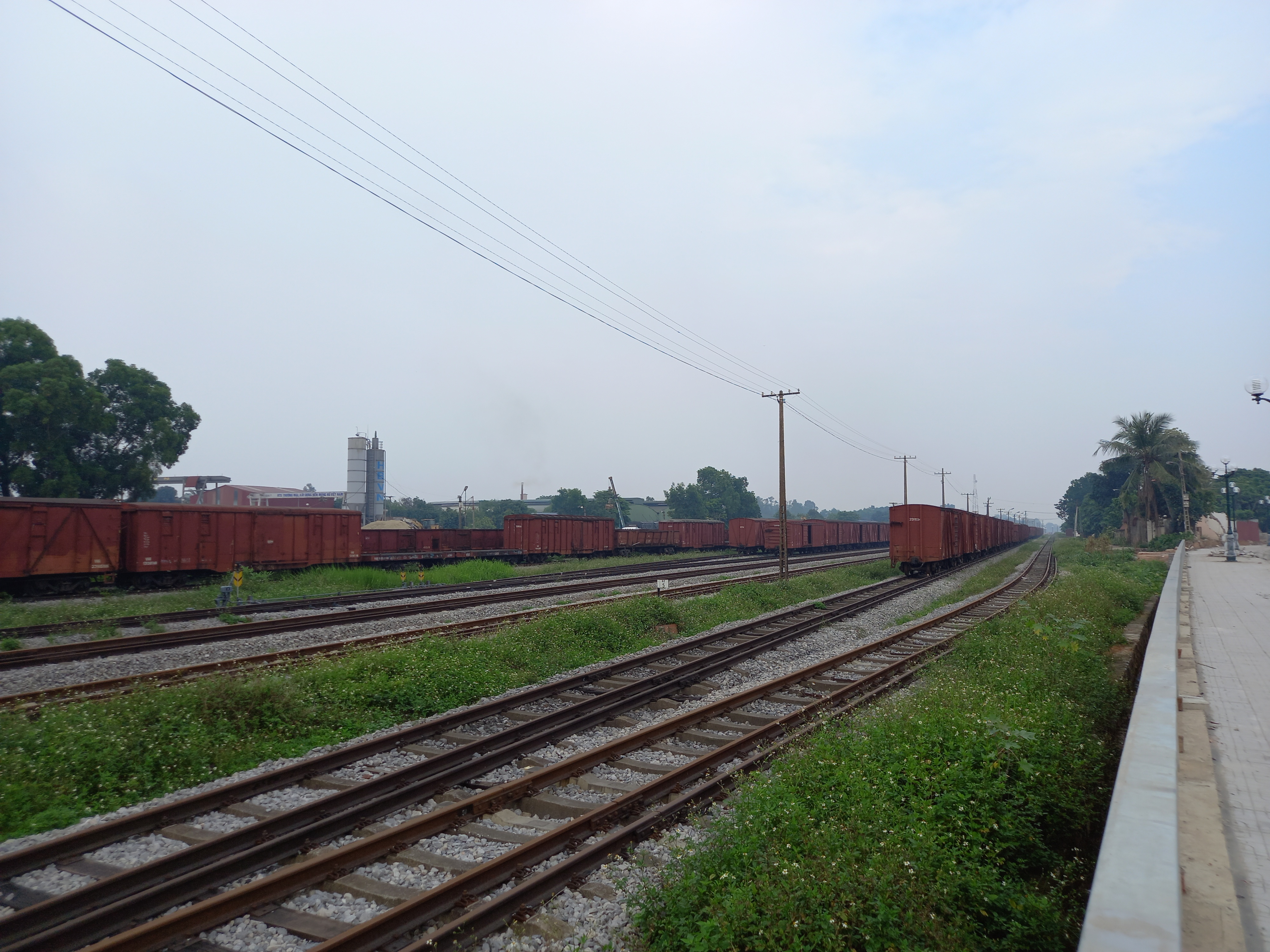
Lưu Xá station

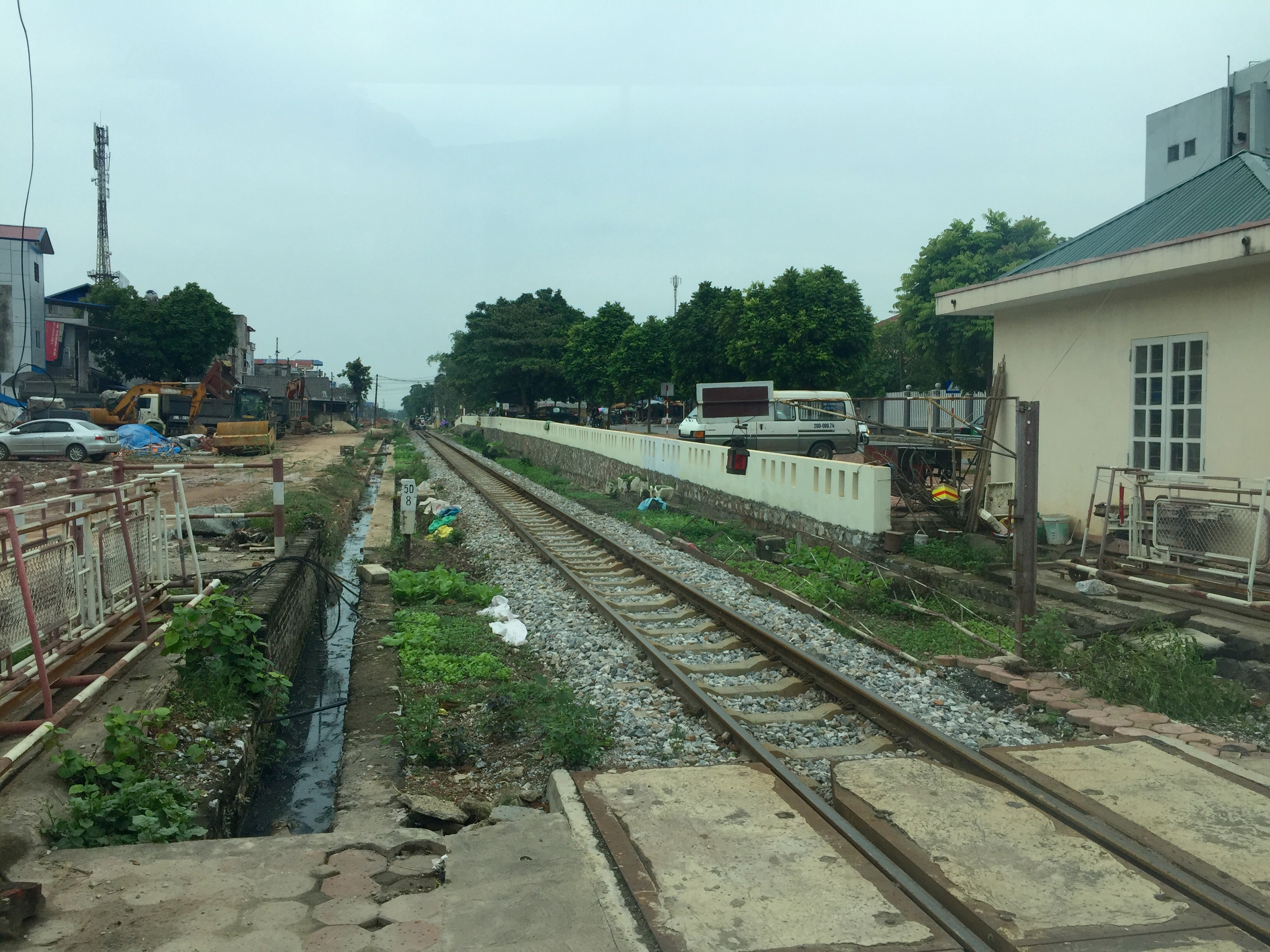
Thái Nguyên station

== See also ==
- List of railway lines in Vietnam
