= Hanoi–Đồng Đăng railway =

Railway line in Vietnam

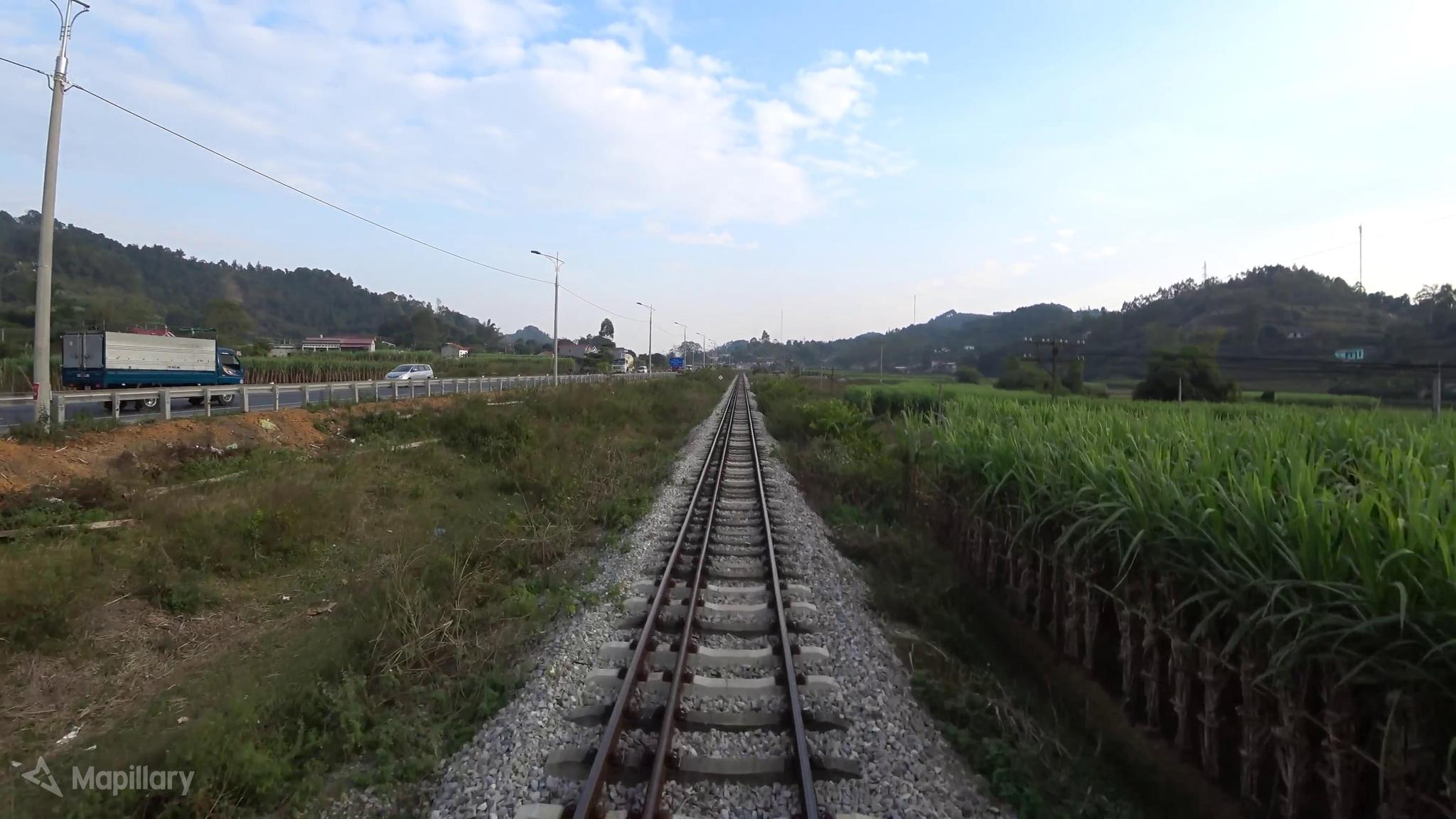
- Hanoi–Đồng Đăng railway (dual gauge)

Overview
- Owner: Vietnam Railways
- Locale: Vietnam
- Termini: Hanoi station; Đồng Đăng station
- Website: http://www.vr.com.vn/en

Service
- Type: Heavy rail

History
- Opened: 1902

Technical
- Line length: 162 km (101 mi)
- Track gauge: 1,435 mm (4 ft 8 1/2 in); 1,000 mm (3 ft 3 3/8 in)

Hanoi–Đồng Đăng railway (Vietnamese: Đường sắt Hà Nội–Đồng Đăng) is a railway line in the country of Vietnam. It is a single-track standard-gauge and metre-gauge (dual-gauge) line connecting the capital Hanoi to Đồng Đăng, on the China-Vietnam border in Lạng Sơn Province. It has a total length of 162 km (101 mi).

At the border, the Hanoi–Đồng Đăng railway connects with the Hunan–Guangxi railway in China. The station on the Chinese side of the Friendship Pass is Pingxiang.

Along with the North–South railway, the Hanoi–Đồng Đăng railway line is part of a rail system across the Eurasian continent.

== History ==
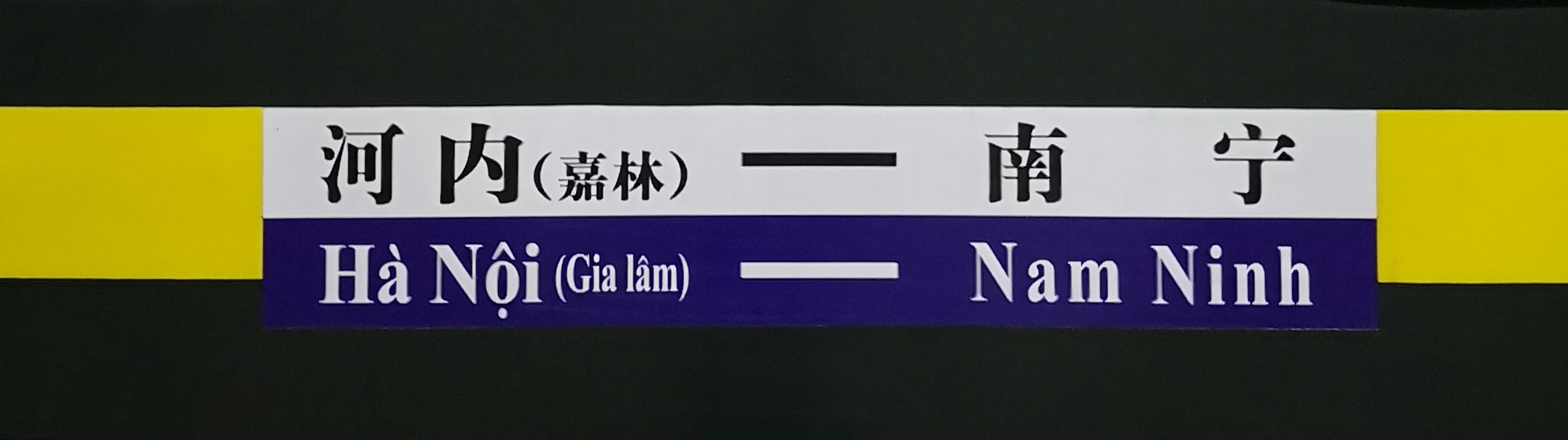
Hanoi-Nanning train sign

The railway was built under the French colonial rule. The first section from Lạng Sơn to Bắc Giang was built between 1890 and 1894, originally adopting a 600 mm narrow gauge. Under the rule of governor Paul Doumer the railway was converted to metre gauge and extended to Hanoi (in 1900), and to Đồng Đăng (in 1902). In 1954 the line was renovated with help from China, and connected to the Chinese Hunan–Guangxi railway. During the Vietnam War, the PLA Railway Corps repaired the railway from wartime damage and converted it to the present dual gauge.

On 1 January 2009 through passenger service between Nanning (China) and Gia Lâm (Hanoi) started.
