= Hanoi–Lào Cai railway =

Railway line in Vietnam

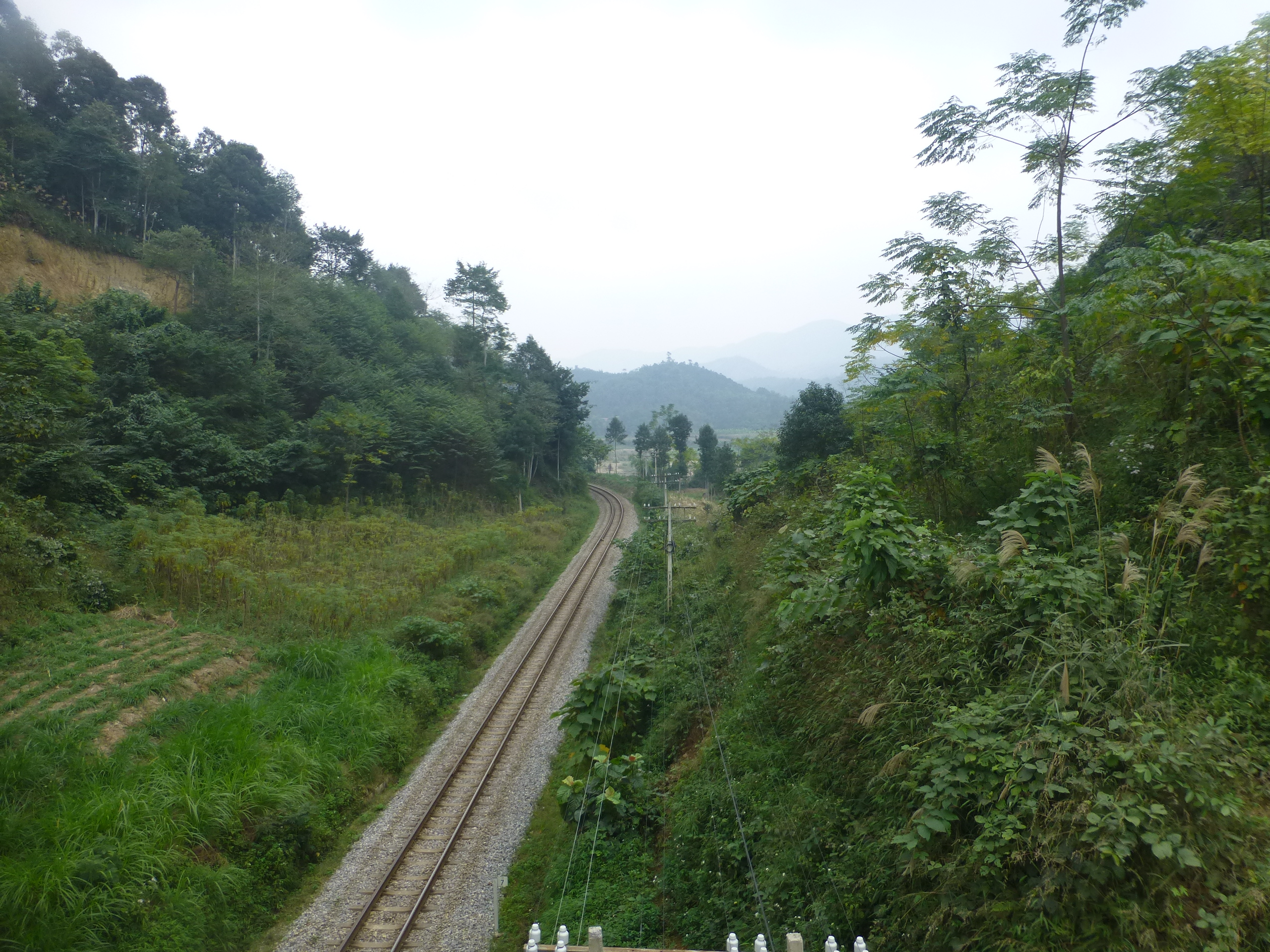

Overview
- Owner: Vietnam Railways
- Locale: Vietnam
- Termini: Hanoi Railway Station; Lào Cai Railway Station
- Website: http://www.vr.com.vn/en

Service
- Type: Heavy rail

History
- Opened: 1902

Technical
- Line length: 296 km (184 mi)
- Track gauge: 1,000 mm (3 ft 3 3/8 in)

Hanoi–Lào Cai Railway (Vietnamese: Đường sắt Hà Nội–Lào Cai) is a 296 km (184 mi) railway line serving northern Vietnam. It is a single-track metre gauge line connecting Hanoi with Lào Cai, on the China-Vietnam border in Lào Cai Province. It is the Vietnamese section of the metre gauge Kunming–Haiphong railway.

At the border, the Hanoi–Lào Cai railway connects with Kunming–Hekou railway of China.

== See also ==
- List of railway lines in Vietnam
