= Da Lat station =

Railway station in Da Lat, Vietnam

Coordinates: 11.942°N 108.455°E

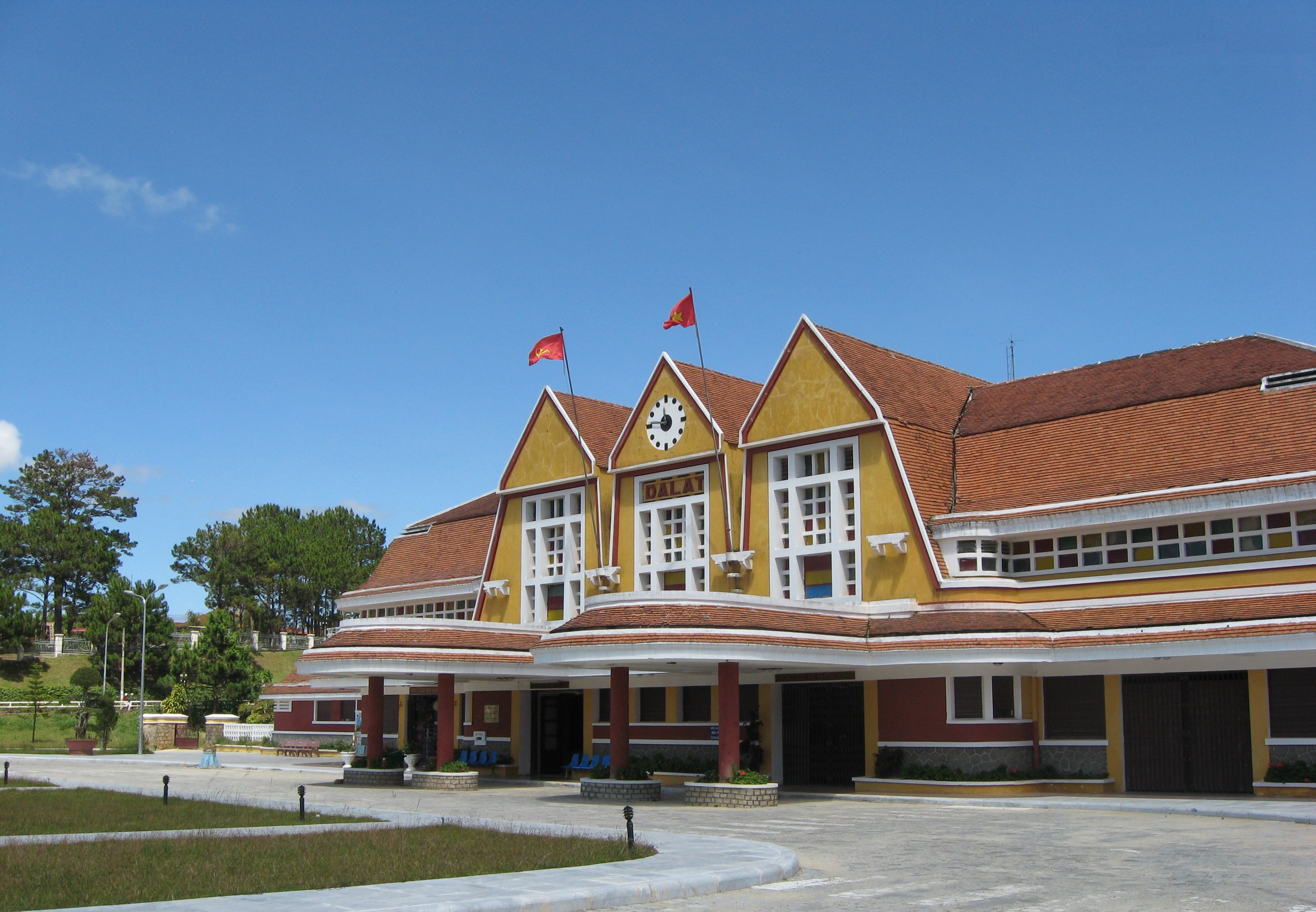
- Da Lat station

General information
- Location: Xuân Hương – Đà Lạt ward, Lâm Đồng Province; Vietnam
- Operator: Vietnam Railways
- Line: Da Lat–Thap Cham Railway
- Platforms: 1
- Tracks: 3

Construction
- Structure type: Ground

History
- Opened: 1932
- Rebuilt: 1938

Services
Preceding station	Vietnam Railways	Following station
Trai Mat towards Tháp Chàm	Thap Cham–Da Lat	Terminus
Location

Da Lat station (Vietnamese: Ga Đà Lạt) is a railway station on the Da Lat–Thap Cham Railway line in Vietnam, serving the town of Da Lat in Lâm Đồng Province. It was designed in 1932 by French architects Moncet and Reveron, and opened in 1938. Largely unused since abandonment of the railway during the later years of the Vietnam War, it was returned to a limited level of service in the 1990s with the reopening of a 7 km (4.3 mi) section of track leading to the nearby village of Trai Mat, operated as a tourist attraction. It is notable for its unique architectural style, which incorporates an overall Art Deco theme with elements of native Cao Nguyen communal houses from Vietnam's Central Highlands.

== History ==
Construction of the Da Lat–Thap Cham Railway began in 1908, a decade after it had first been proposed by Paul Doumer, then Governor General of French Indochina, and proceeded in stages. Due to the difficulty of the mountainous terrain west of Sông Pha—where the Ngoan Muc Pass rose into the Central Highlands—construction proceeded slowly, requiring several rack railway sections and tunnels to be built. The railway was 84 km (52 mi) long, and rose almost 1,400 metres (4,600 ft) along a winding route with three rack rail sections and five tunnels. The railway tracks finally reached Da Lat in 1932, 24 years after construction had begun. Another railway station existed at the time, operated by the SGAI, a company that had managed the operation of the railway until that time. The job of designing and constructing a new railway station to replace the old one was given to French architects Moncet and Reveron, who submitted a proposal designed by Reveron in 1932. The new station would follow the Art Deco style popular at the time, but would incorporate some characteristics of a Cao Nguyen communal house of Vietnam's Central Highlands, specifically with its high, steep roofs. Construction of the new station began in 1935, directly supervised by Moncet, and was completed three years later in 1938, becoming one of the first colonial-style buildings to be erected in the area.

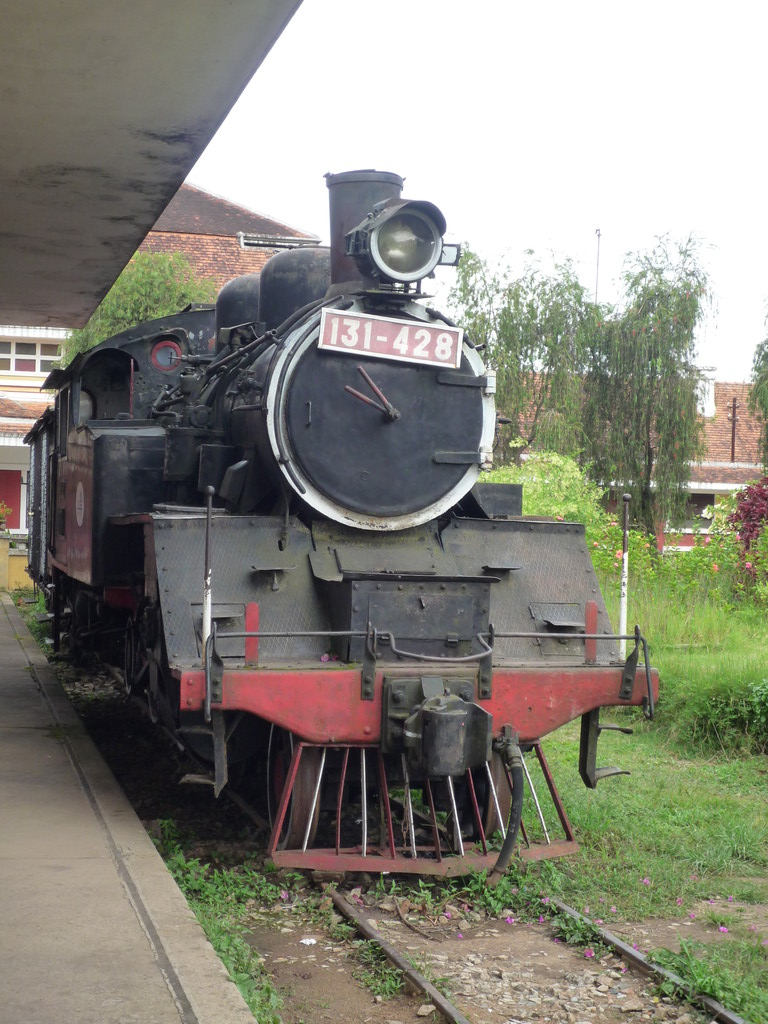
A JNR Class C12 steam locomotive at Da Lat railway station

Throughout the Vietnam War, the Da Lat–Thap Cham line—as with the entire Vietnamese railway network—was a target of bombardments and sabotage. Relentlessly sabotaged and mined by the Viet Cong, the line gradually fell out of use, with regular operations coming to an end in 1968. Following the Fall of Saigon in April 1975, the railway was dismantled to provide materials for the repair of the main line. In the 1990s, however, a 7 km (4.3 mi) section of the line between Da Lat railway station and the nearby village of Trại Mát was restored and returned to active use as a tourist attraction.

A 2002 planning document listed the restoration of the entire Da Lat–Thap Cham railway as a priority for infrastructure development for Da Lat and Lâm Đồng Province, including the upgrading of Da Lat railway station to handle passenger and cargo transportation. The proposed renewal received the backing of provincial and local governments, and the national government indicated that private companies would also be allowed to participate in the reconstruction of the railway. The project would also include a connection to the North–South Railway at Thap Cham, allowing trains to circulate between Da Lat and the rest of the country for the first time since the Vietnam War. In December 2009, four rail cars restored to look like the rail cars used on the Da Lat–Thap Cham line in the 1930s were put into use on the Da Lat–Trai Mat tourist railroad, carrying signage reading "Dalat Plateau Rail Road".

== Architecture ==
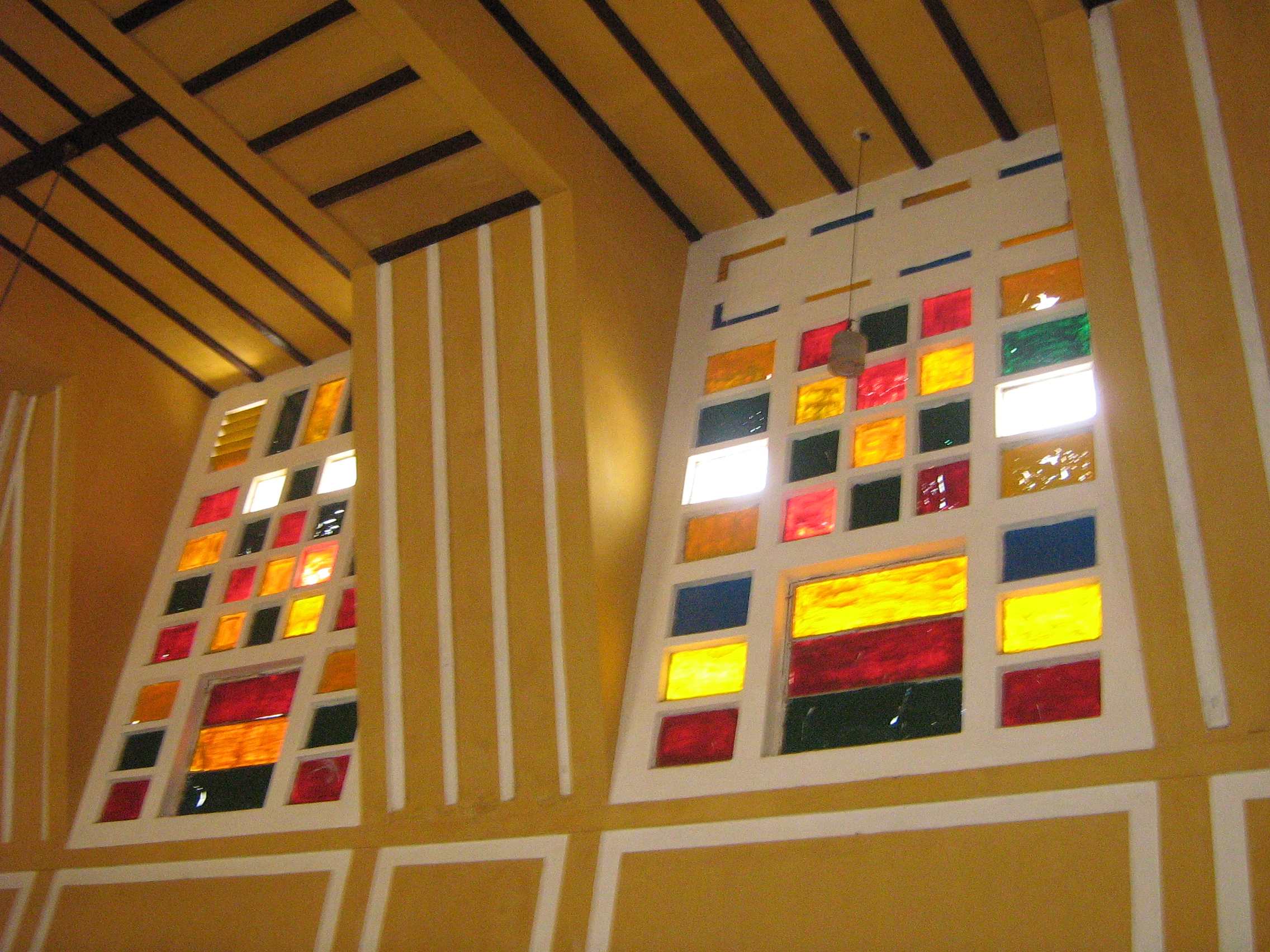
The station's coloured glass windows

Built in 1938, Da Lat railway station was designed in the Art Deco architectural style by French architects Moncet and Reveron, although it incorporates the high, pointed roofs characteristic of the Cao Nguyen communal buildings of ethnic minorities from Vietnam's Central Highlands. The three roofs, said to represent the three peaks of Dalat's iconic Lang Biang mountain, are also reminiscent of Normandy's Trouville-Deauville Station.

Under each roof is a multicoloured glass window, and under the central roof is a large clock, which has recently been restored. Inside the station, the elevated roofs create a raised ceiling. At the front of the station is a porte-cochère (coach gate), supported by two rows of twelve columns each. The station's unique design earned it recognition as a national historical monument in 2001.

== See also ==
- Rail transport in Vietnam
- Da Lat–Thap Cham Railway

== Notes and references ==
Bibliography

- Nguyễn Tấn Dũng (2002-05-27). "Ratifying the Readjusted General Planning of Da Lat City, Lam Dong Province, and its Adjacent Areas to 2020". AsianLII.
