= Ngoạn Mục Pass =

Mountain pass in Vietnam

Coordinates: 11.8340°N 108.6450°E

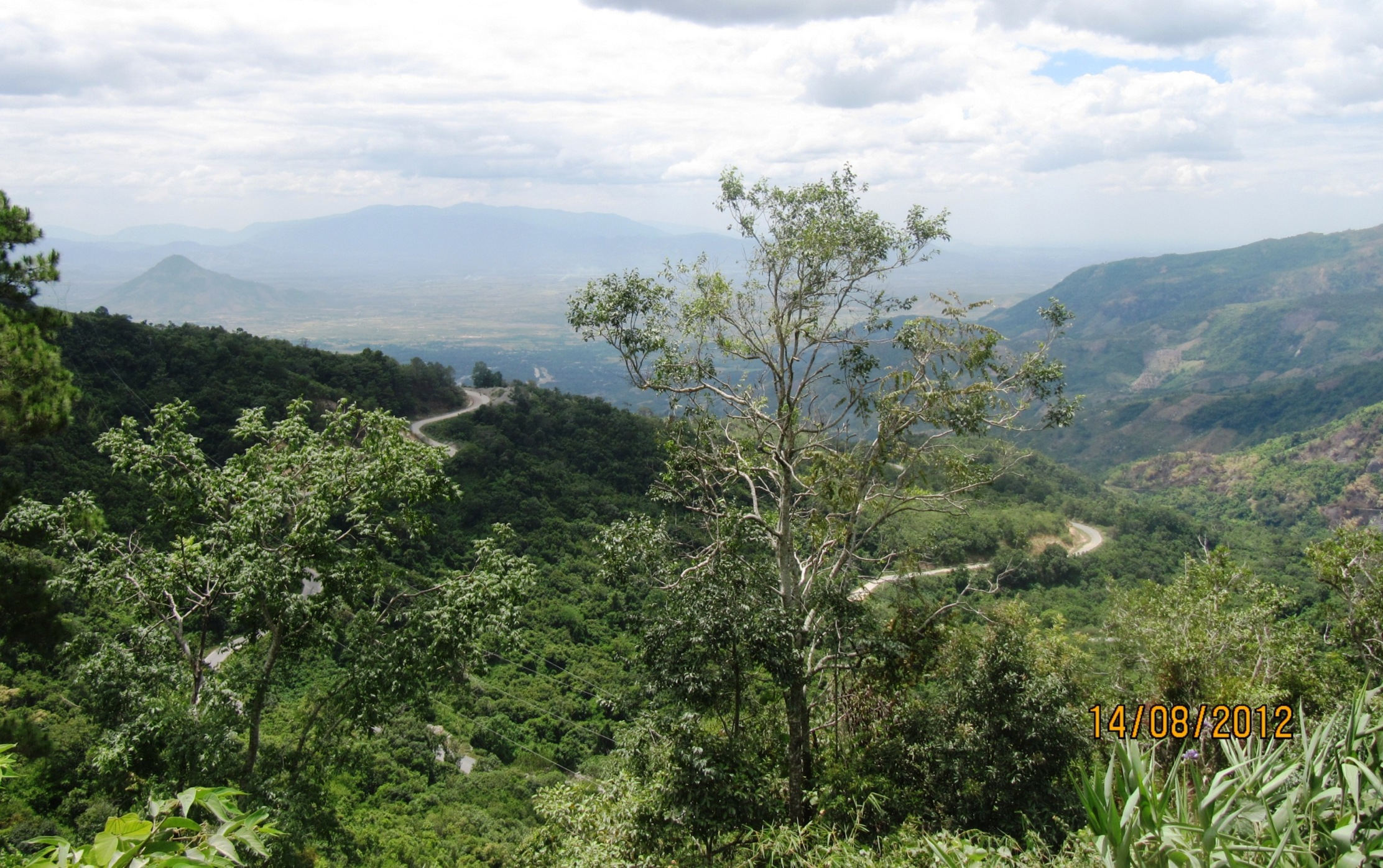
Ngoan Muc Pass

The Ngoạn Mục Pass, also called the Sông Pha pass, after Sông Pha at the foot of the pass, is a scenic mountain pass in Vietnam between Ninh Thuận province and the Lang Biang plateau. It was known to the French as Bellevue Pass.
