= Rail transport in Vietnam =

Operation
- National railway: Vietnam Railways

System length
- Total: 2,600 kilometres (1,600 mi)
- Double track: 0 km (0 mi)
- Electrified: 0 km (0 mi)
- High-speed: 0 km (0 mi)

Track gauge
- Main: 1,000 mm (3 ft 3 3/8 in); 1,435 mm (4 ft 8 1/2 in)
- Meter gauge: 2,169 km (1,348 mi)
- Standard gauge: 178 km (111 mi)

Features
- No. of tunnels: 39
- Tunnel length: 11,512 m (37,769 ft)
- No. of bridges: 1,790
- No. of stations: 278
Map
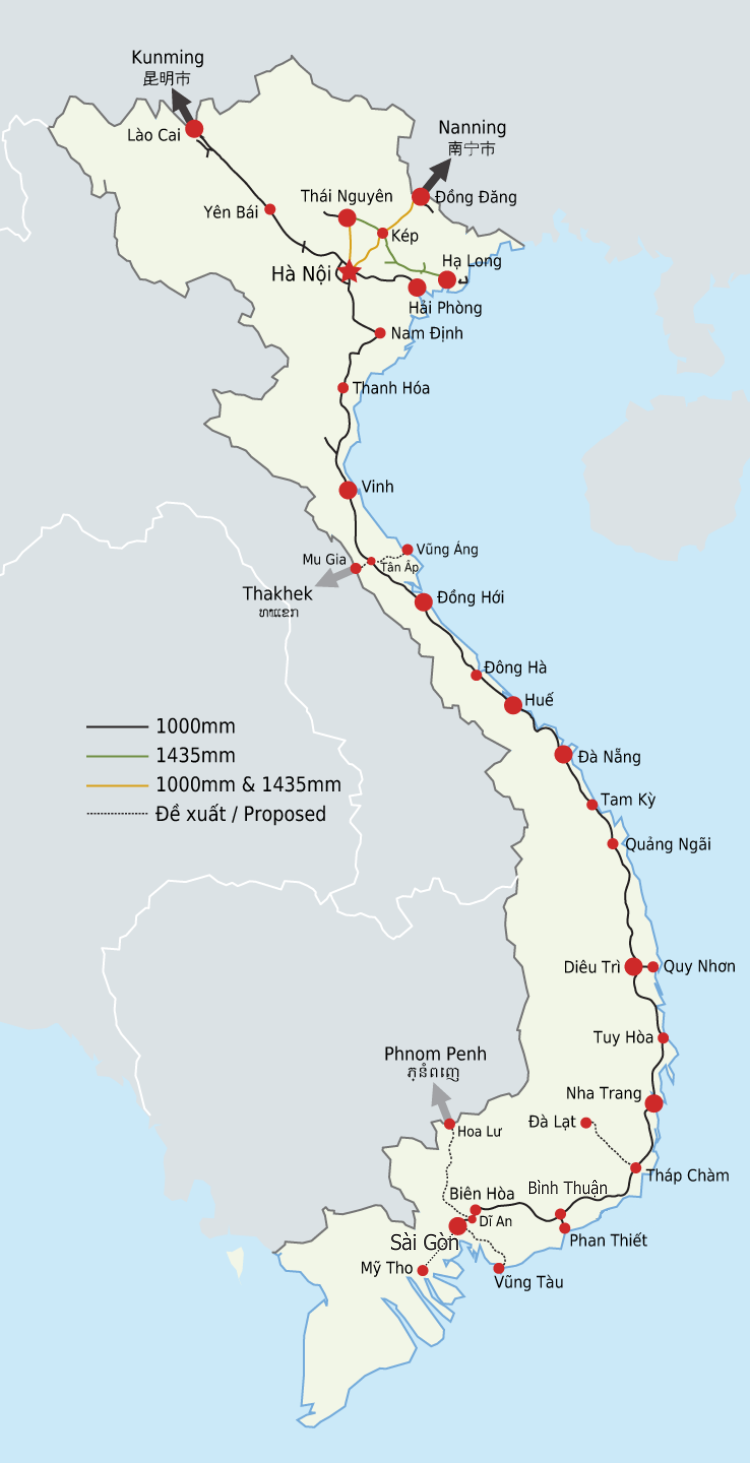

The railway system in Vietnam is owned and operated by the state-owned Vietnam Railways (Vietnamese: Đường sắt Việt Nam). The principal route, the single track North-South Railway running between Hanoi and Ho Chi Minh City, accounts for 1,726 kilometres (1,072 mi) of the network's total length of 2,600 kilometres (1,600 mi). The national railway network uses mainly metre gauge, although there are several standard gauge and mixed gauge lines in the north of the country.

The first railways in Vietnam were established in the 1880s, with construction beginning in 1888; these included a tram running between the ports of Saigon and Cholon, and a regional rail line connecting Saigon with Mỹ Tho. Railway construction flourished soon afterwards, during the administration of Paul Doumer as Governor-General of French Indochina from 1897 to 1902. It was during this time that construction of the Yunnan–Vietnam and North–South railways began. Construction of the north–south line took over thirty years, finally ending in 1936, during which time other branch lines were also completed. Beginning in World War II, the entire rail network became a target of bombing attacks by a number of groups, including both North Vietnamese and South Vietnamese troops during the Vietnam War. Although the main lines—particularly the North–South line—were quickly restored and returned to service once conflict ended, many branch lines were abandoned and dismantled at their expense, their infrastructure used to replace damaged sections of the main lines, or sold as scrap.

With increased economic growth brought on by the Doi Moi reforms of the late 1980s, the railway system has entered a renewed phase of development. A number of major projects supported by official development assistance have been proposed or are currently underway, including a series of projects to improve bridge and railway safety on the North-South Railway line, connections to Cambodia and Laos, and the restoration of a number of defunct lines, including the Đà Lạt–Tháp Chàm railway first established in the 1930s. A high-speed rail link between Hanoi and Ho Chi Minh City has also been proposed, which would reduce journey length from 30 hours to around 6 hours. Laos has held a ceremony but construction remains stalled (2019) on a rail line to Lao Bao from Savannakhet, across from the Thai rail head to Bangkok. Two high-speed railway projects include the North-South Railway Express and the Ho Chi Minh City–Cần Thơ express railway.

== Usage ==
Rail transport remains relatively underused as a mode of transport in Vietnam. While road transport dominates the transport sector by far—accounting for 65% of freight moved as of 2006—rail transport accounted for only 4% of freight transportation in 2008, and 5% of passenger transportation, leading it to be considered the "least relevant" of all modes of transport in the European Union's 2010 Green Book on Vietnam. According to reports by the Asian Development Bank, however, the rail transport is growing, and carving out a significant role for itself in long-distance bulk cargo transport.

The following table gives an overview of rail transport volume and traffic over the period from 1998 to 2011:

Transport type	1998	2000	2002	2004	2006	2008	2009	2010	2011
Freight volume (kt)	4977.6	6258.2	7051.9	8873.6	9153.2	8481.1	8247.5	7861.5	7234.1
Freight traffic (Mt-km)	1369.0	1955.0	2391.5	2745.3	3446.6	4170.9	3864.5	3960.9	4098.5
Passenger volume (Mpeople)	9.7	9.8	10.8	12.9	11.6	11.3	11.1	11.2	11.9
Passenger traffic (Mpeople-km)	2542.3	3199.9	3697.2	4376.3	4333.7	4560.4	4138.1	4377.9	4569.1

== History ==
=== Colonial beginnings ===
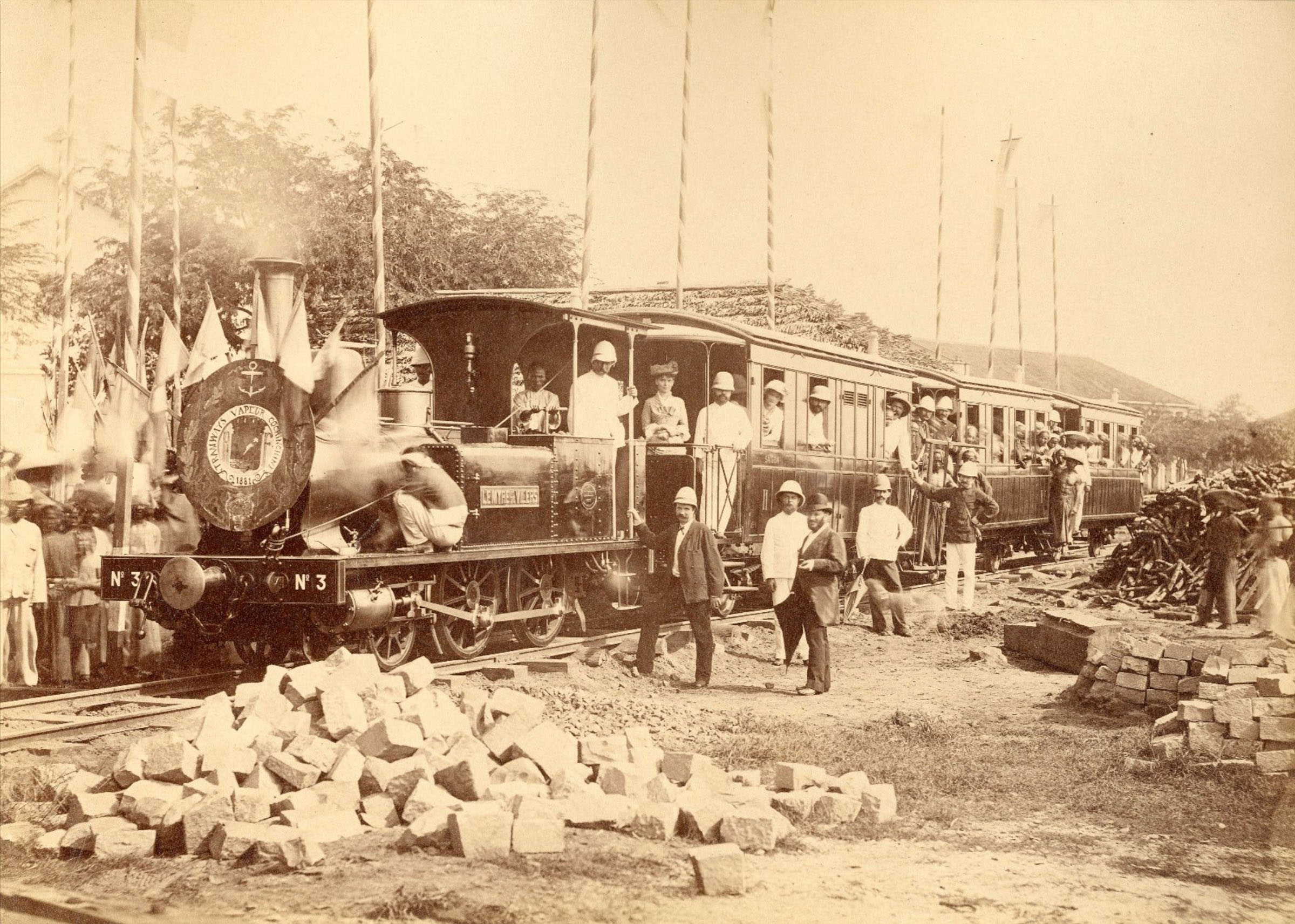
Inauguration of the Saigon–Cholon tramway, 1881.

Rail transport was introduced to Vietnam in the 1880s, supported by the French administration of Indochina. The earliest rail project to be completed was the Saigon–Cholon tramway, established in 1881 in what was then Cochinchina, operated by the Cochinchina Steam Tramway Company (SGTVC). After a month of operation, the Lieutenant Governor of Cochinchina noted that ridership had already reached two thousand passengers. Construction of the first regional rail project, linking Saigon and Mỹ Tho, began in the same year, to be completed soon afterwards in 1885. The Saigon–Mỹ Tho line reduced travel time between the two cities from 12 hours to only 3 hours, and established a connection between Saigon and the shipping lanes of the Mekong Delta. The first railway in Tonkin, a 600 mm (1 ft 11 5/8 in) gauge line connecting Lạng Sơn to Phu Lang Thuong (now known as Bắc Giang), was established in 1895.

Railway construction multiplied during the administration of Paul Doumer as Governor-General of French Indochina from 1897 to 1902. Doumer's predecessor, Jean Marie de Lanessan, had been convinced of the necessity of building railways to connect the different parts of Indochina, and had identified certain key routes that should be built as a matter of priority; among these, a route connecting Hanoi and Saigon, and another connecting Hanoi and Lào Cai. In 1897, Doumer submitted an overarching proposal for railway development in Indochina, including plans for what would eventually become the Yunnan–Vietnam Railway and the North–South Railway. The French government approved the construction of the entire Yunnan line and several sections of the North–South line, approving a loan of 200 million francs within the following year. Work began swiftly thereafter, with the Phu Lang Thuong—Lạng Sơn line being upgraded and extended from Hanoi to the Chinese border at Dong Dang. The section between Gia Lâm and Đồng Đăng was inaugurated in July 1900 but completion of gauge conversion of the remaining section and the first section of the Yunnan line between Hanoi and Haiphong were not completed until 1902.

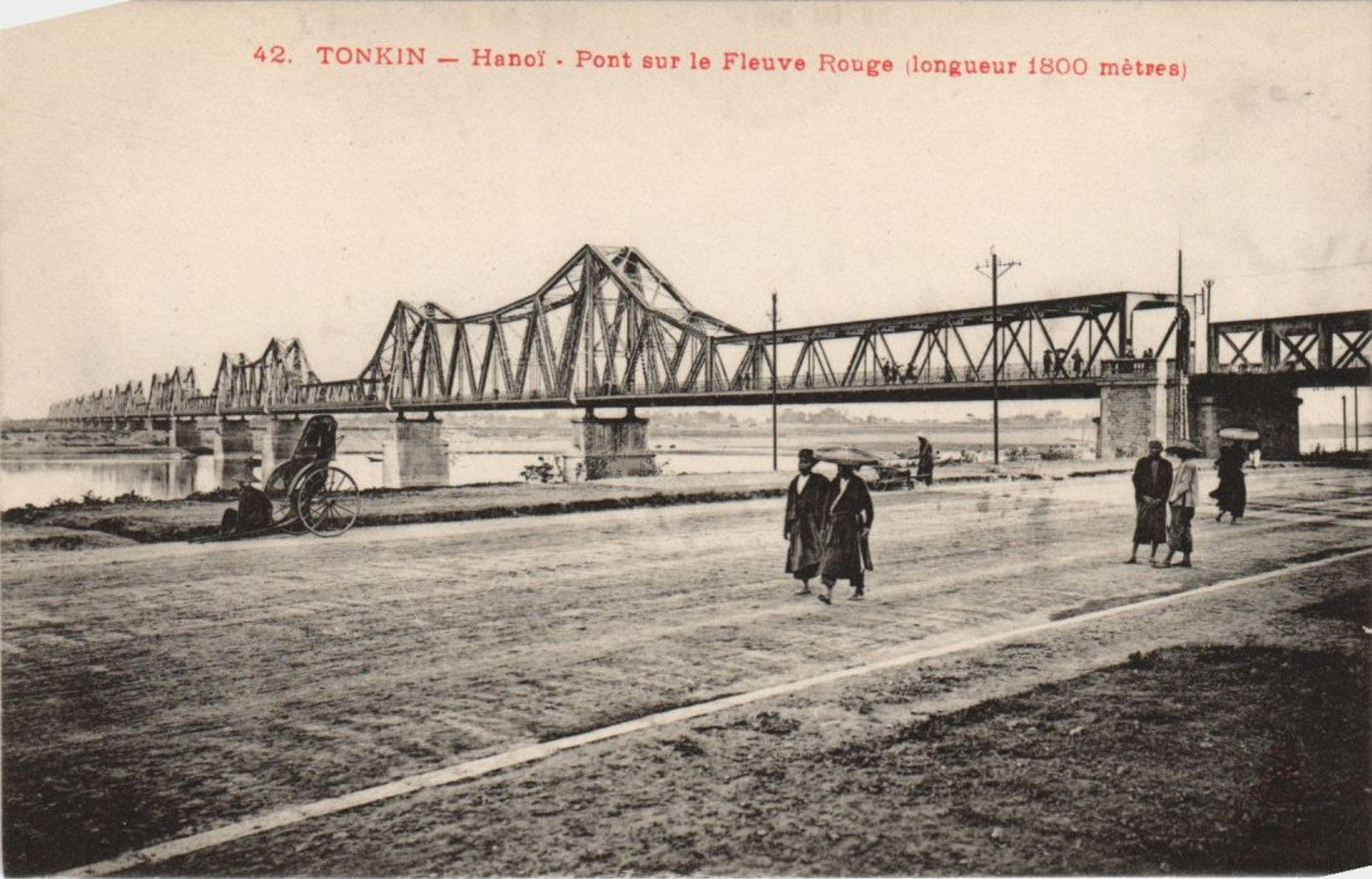
Long Bien Bridge, built in 1902.

The Hanoi–Haiphong railway was one leg of the Yunnan–Vietnam Railway, which had begun construction in 1900, and continued northward with the erection of Paul Doumer Bridge (now known as Long Bien Bridge) in 1902, the largest bridge in Southeast Asia at that time. Construction on the Yunnan line continued northwestward towards the border town of Lào Cai, opening in segments beginning in 1903; the entire Hanoi–Lào Cai line was finally opened in 1906. Finally, in 1910, the line was extended to its final destination of Kunming. Construction of the Yunnan line was an extremely difficult undertaking, incurring not only great expenditures but also a great loss of human life. At least 12,000 labourers died from malaria or accidents, 10,000 of these in the Nanxi River Valley alone.

Construction of the North–South Railway began in 1899, and lasted over thirty years, with individual sections completed serially: from 1899 to 1905, the Hanoi–Vinh section was laid down, followed by the Nha Trang–Saigon section from 1905 to 1913, then the Vinh–Huế section from 1913 to 1927, and finally, the remaining Huế–Nha Trang section from 1930 to 1936. On 2 October 1936, the entire 1,726 km (1,072 mi) Hanoi–Saigon link was formally put into full operation. The first journeys from end to end of the newly completed line, dubbed the Transindochinois, generally took about 60 hours, or two days and three nights. This decreased to about 40 hours by the late 1930s, with trains travelling at an average speed of 43 km/h (27 mph).

=== Wartime ===
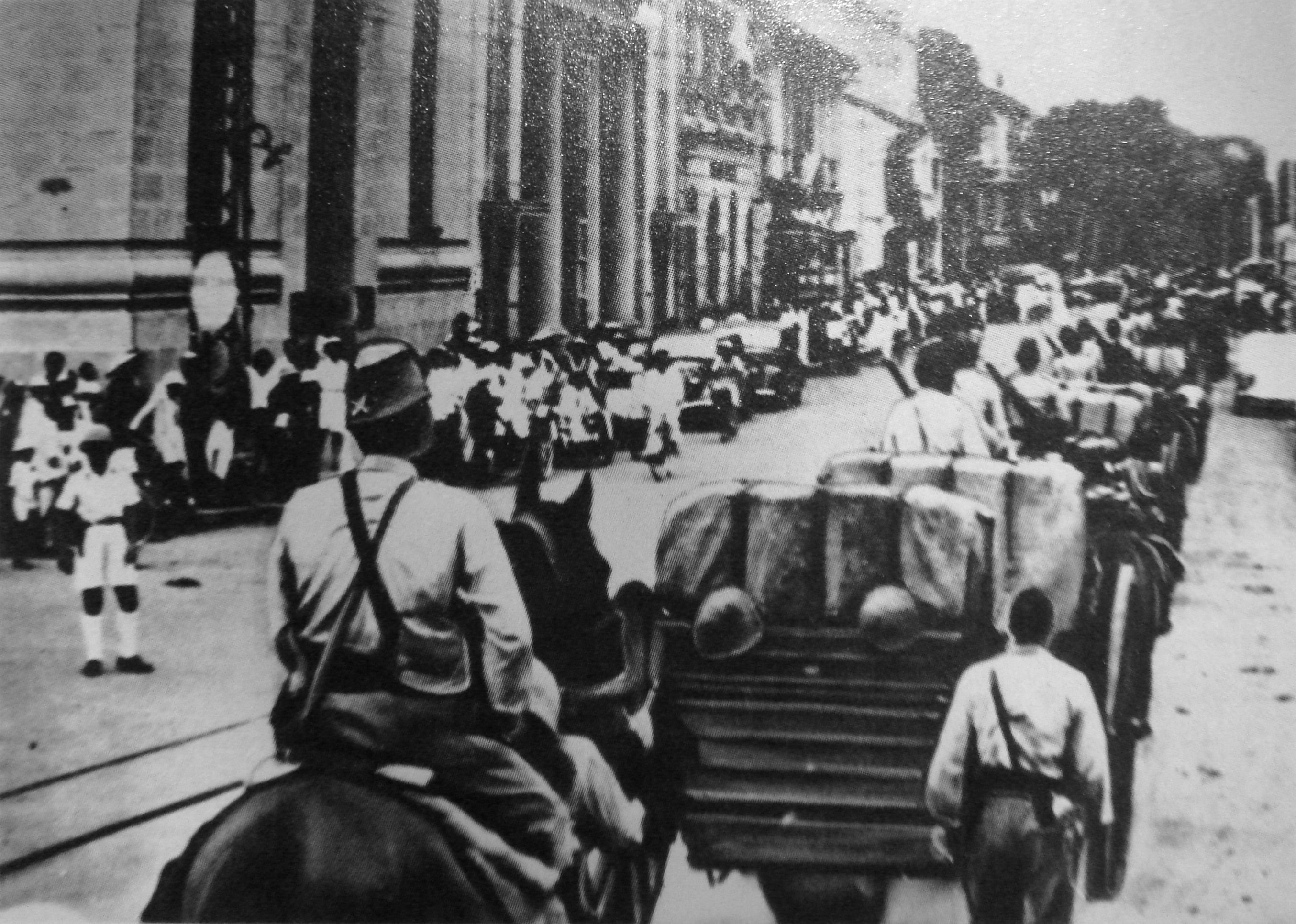
The Japanese Indochina Expeditionary Army enters Saigon in 1941.

From the beginning of the Second Sino-Japanese War in 1937, the railway into Yunnan served as a channel for arms shipments to the Chinese Kuomintang. French refusal to halt shipments of arms and other war-related goods to China through Tonkin eventually provoked the Invasion of French Indochina by Japanese forces in 1940. The Japanese used the railway system extensively during their occupation, inviting sabotage by the Viet Minh as well as airborne Allied bombing raids. The railways sustained considerable damage, including the destruction of bridges.

Shortly after World War II ended, the First Indochina War began, and the Viet Minh's sabotage of the rail system continued, this time against the armies of the French Union. The French returned several sections of the railway to full operation, allowing trains to circulate freely from Saigon to Ninh Hoa, Saigon to Loc Ninh, Saigon to Mỹ Tho and Huế to Tourane (Da Nang) by the end of 1947. The sections lying between Nha Trang and Tourane and north of Huế were judged to be too insecure to be returned to service at the time.

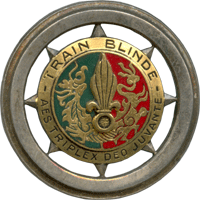
Insignia of La Rafale, the armoured train used by the French.

Early in the conflict, the Viet Minh's sabotage attempts failed to seriously damage the French railways, and most trains circulated without much protection. Beginning in 1947, however, the Viet Minh began to use mines, with circulation slowing to a crawl as they became more and more powerful. In response, the French began using the armed armoured train La Rafale as both a cargo-carrier and a mobile surveillance unit. In February 1951 the first Rafale was in service on the Saigon-Nha Trang section of the North–South line, manned by the 2nd Foreign Infantry Regiment (French Foreign Legion). Use of the Rafale failed to deter the Viet Minh, however, who continued sabotaging the line, making off with its rails under cover of night and using them to create a 300-kilometre (190 mi)-long clandestine rail network between Ninh Hoa and Da Nang, in a Viet Minh-controlled area. In 1954, following the signature of the Geneva Accords and the end of the First Indochina War, Vietnam—along with its railway system—was divided along the Bến Hải River in Quảng Trị Province.

Throughout the Vietnam War, the Vietnamese railway network—especially the North–South Railway—was a target of bombardments and sabotage by both North Vietnamese and South Vietnamese forces. In the South, American aid allowed the South Vietnamese government to reconstruct the main line between Saigon and Huế, and several branch lines were also completed. As reconstruction efforts advanced, however, bombardments and sabotage of the railways by the Viet Cong and the North Vietnamese intensified, reducing the transportation capacity and effectiveness of the railway, and eventually forcing the abandonment of many large sections of the track. In 1964, Typhoons Joan and Iris, the worst to strike Vietnam in sixty-five years, damaged the railway system even further, restricting operations to five separated segments. A second reconstruction effort, assisted again by the U.S. government, began in December 1966, and progressed in those areas where security was re-established. The system reopened 340 kilometers of main line in areas where security was restored.

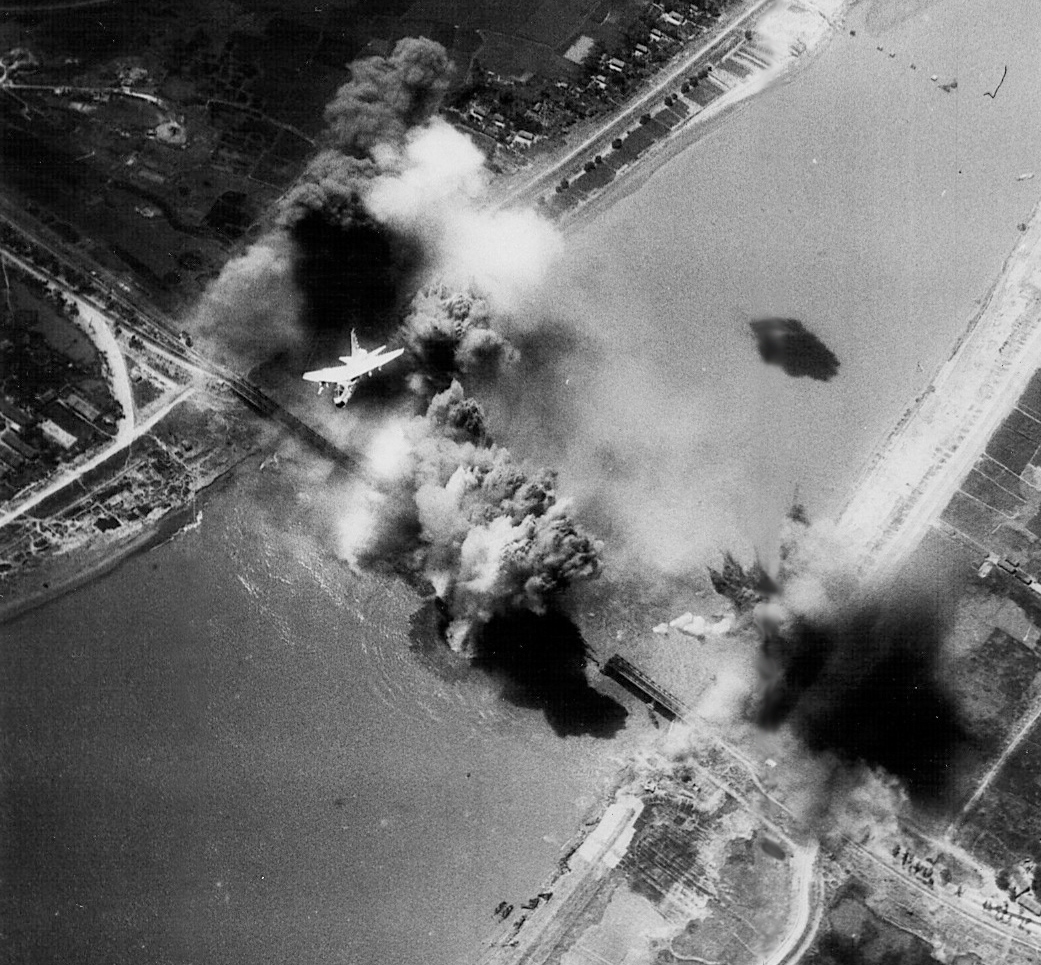
An American attack squadron bombs the Hải Dương bridge during Operation Linebacker I.

In North Vietnam, American bombing of railways was concentrated on key targets such as bridges, both along the North–South Railway and along the lines north of Hanoi, such as the Hanoi–Lào Cai and Hanoi–Dong Dang lines. At several points during the war, American bombing severely hindered transport along both lines, on which the North Vietnamese depended for shipments from their Chinese allies. Operation Rolling Thunder was the first large-scale bombing campaign carried out by the U.S. Air Force, taking place from March 2, 1965, until November 1, 1968, when US President Lyndon B. Johnson temporarily called off air raids. Large-scale air raids resumed from May 9 to October 23, 1972, for Operation Linebacker, and again from December 18–29, 1972, for Operation Linebacker II, with fewer target restrictions than Rolling Thunder.

Railway engineering troops from the People's Republic of China, deployed in late June 1965, were tasked with repairing the damage caused by the bombing. By late December of that year, reconstruction was complete on 363 kilometers of both the Hanoi–Lào Cai and Hanoi–Dong Dang lines, significantly increasing shipping capacity. A third rail was added to the existing lines, using standard gauge spacing, effectively converting them to mixed gauge lines. This allowed Chinese trains to connect directly with the Vietnamese railway network, without the need for a break-of-gauge. Many new stations, bridges and tunnels were also built, and an entirely new rail line, the Thái Nguyên–Kép line, was built as a strategic connection between the Hanoi–Dong Dang and Hanoi–Thái Nguyên lines.

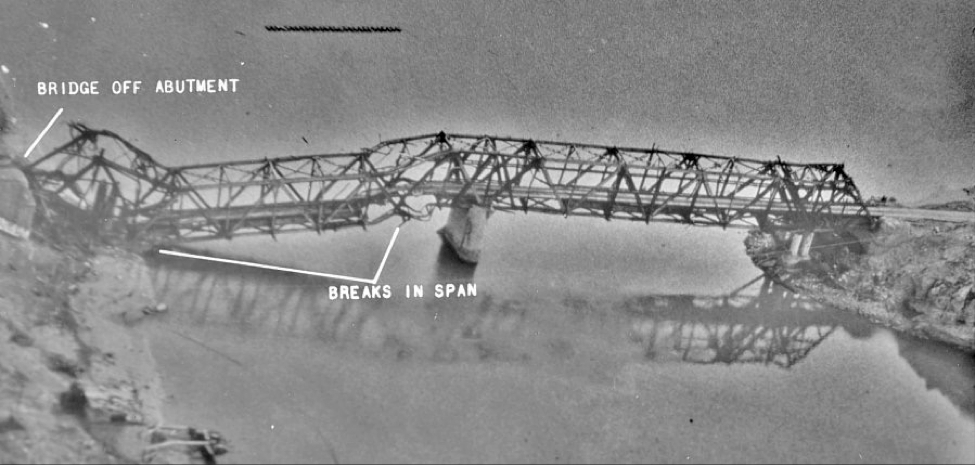
The Thanh Hóa Bridge, damaged by American bombs in 1972.

A particularly difficult target for U.S. Air Force bombers was the Thanh Hóa Bridge, a well-defended combined road/rail bridge along the main line in Thanh Hóa Province. The bridge was attacked several times from 1965 to 1972. Several times, traffic over the bridge was interrupted, but every time, the North Vietnamese were able to repair the damage. The bridge was eventually destroyed by laser-guided smart bombs during separate raids on April 27 and May 13, 1972, as part of Operation Linebacker.

After the Fall of Saigon on 30 April 1975, the Communist government of the newly unified Vietnam took control of the former South Vietnamese railway. The heavily damaged, war-torn North–South line was restored and returned to service on 31 December 1976, promoted as a symbol of Vietnamese unity. In the short time between the surrender of the South and the reopening of the line, 1334 bridges, 27 tunnels, 158 stations and 1370 switches had been repaired. Other railway lines that once existed, such as the Da Lat–Thap Cham line, were dismantled during this period to provide materials for the repair of the main line. The outbreak of the Sino–Vietnamese War in 1979 resulted in the closing of borders, including railways; particularly, the railway bridge that connected Lào Cai and Hekou on the Yunnan–Vietnam line was destroyed by sabotage during the conflict. Rail traffic between the two countries would eventually resume in 1992.

== Network ==
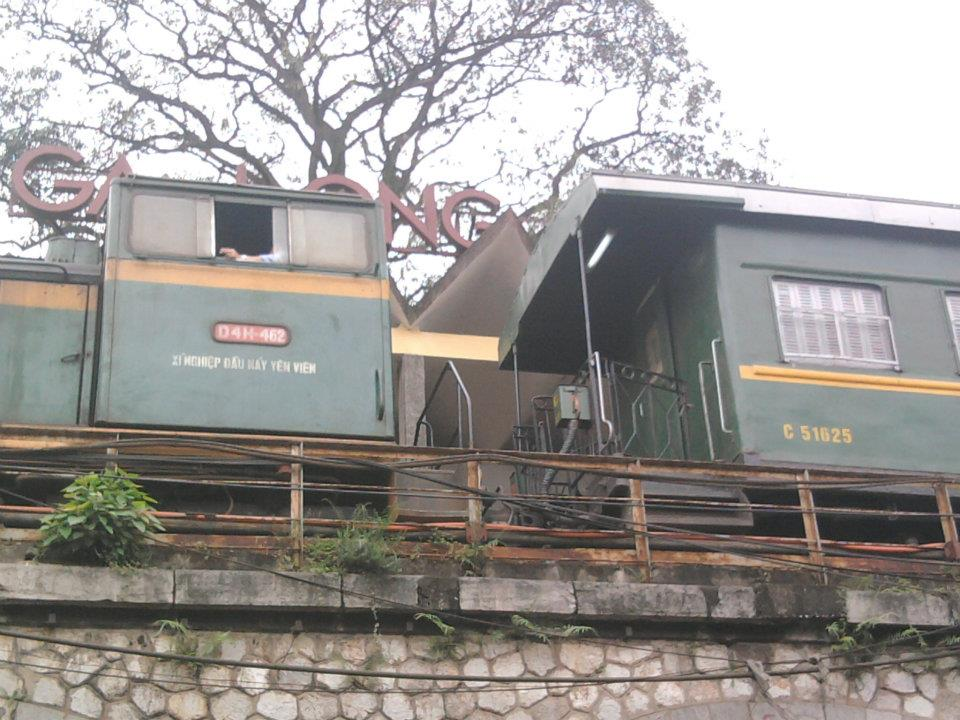
A D4H locomotive in Long Biên Railway Station

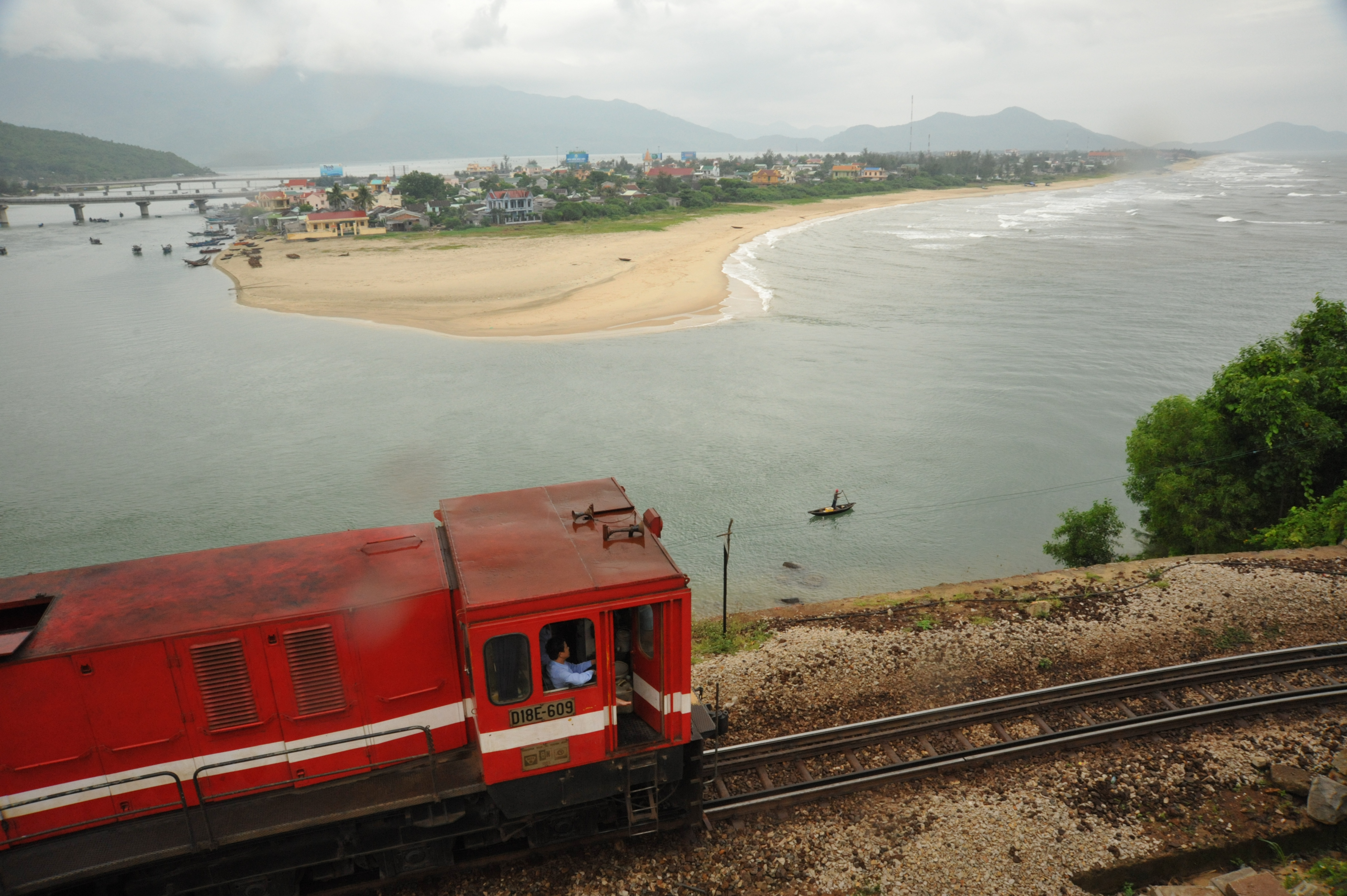
A diesel locomotive at Lang Co Beach.

The Vietnamese railway network has a total length of 2,600 kilometres (1,600 mi), dominated by the north–south line running between Hanoi and Ho Chi Minh City; as of 2007, 85% of the network's passenger volume and 60% of its cargo volume was transported along this line. There were 278 stations on the Vietnamese railway network as of 2005, 191 of which were located along the north–south line.

=== Operational realities ===
The north–south line goes through some congested urban areas, with very little clearance (less than 1 meter on each side), instead they rely on blazing horns. Though the line is single track, speed does pick up outside urban areas, and the rails themselves are of quality to easily outpace any highway traffic, nevertheless this does not allow for schedule flexibility and frequency nor much safety as grade separation is almost nonexistent and level crossings the norm.

=== Proposals ===
Several railway lines have been proposed for construction in Vietnam in recent years. The largest such project is the high-speed North–South Express Railway connecting Hanoi and Ho Chi Minh City, (see High-speed rail, below) valued at approximately US$56 billion. Due to its cost, plans for the line are currently on hold pending further study of the project. Other projects involve the restoration of previously existing lines, such as the Da Lat–Tháp Chàm and Ho Chi Minh City–Loc Ninh lines, both of which were originally built in the 1930s, but fell into disuse after decades of war. The proposed Ho Chi Minh City–Moc Bai and Mụ Giạ–Vung Ang lines (both of which had either existed or been considered before World War II) would establish Vietnam's first international railway links to Cambodia and Laos, respectively.

=== Current lines ===
Description	Established	Length	Stations	Travel time	Gauge	Note
North-South Railway	1936	1,726 km (1,072 mi)	191	30-37 hrs	Metre gauge	Main Line
Hanoi–Lào Cai	1906	296 km (184 mi)	40	7,5 hrs	Metre gauge	Main Line, sometimes recorded as Yen Vien – Lao Cai line
Hanoi–Đồng Đăng	1902	163 km (101 mi)	23	4.25 hrs	Mixed gauge	Main Line
Kép–Ha Long	1950s	106 km (66 mi)	12	4.5 hours	Standard gauge	Main Line
Hanoi–Haiphong	1902	102 km (63 mi)	18	2.5 hours	Metre gauge	Main Line. Some recorded as Gia Lam – Haiphong line
Hanoi–Thái Nguyên	1962	75 km (47 mi)	14	??	Mixed gauge	Some recorded as Dong Anh – Quan Trieu line
Thái Nguyên–Kép	1966	57 km (35 mi)	6? (Note: Assuming Lưu Xá and Kép stations had already been built prior to 1966. "The First Division had to construct four tunnels, ... four train stations, and several bridges along the Kép-Thái Nguyên [or Ke-Tai, central] line." Col. Hou Zhenlu, quoted in Xiaobing Li; Robert McMahon (2010). Voices from the Vietnam War: Stories from American, Asian, and Russian Veterans. University Press of Kentucky. p. 221. ISBN 978-0-8131-2592-3.)	??	Standard gauge	Some recorded as Luu Xa – Kep line
Pho Lu–Xuan Giao	??	11 km (6.8 mi)	??	??	??	Branch line on Yen Vien – Lao Cai line
Tien Kien–Bai Bang	??	10.5 km (6.5 mi)	??	??	Metre gauge	??
Da Lat–Trai Mat	1932	7 km (4.3 mi)	2	??	Metre gauge	Isolated Line since Da Lat–Trai Mat has been partially rehabilitated for the last 7 km out of 84 km
Tien Kien–Lam Thao	??	4.1 km (2.5 mi)	??	??	Metre gauge	Branch line on Yen Vien – Lao Cai line

=== Proposed lines ===
Description	Length	Gauge	Notes
North–South Express Railway	1,570 km (980 mi)	Standard gauge	Cancelled, See High-speed rail, below.
Ho Chi Minh City–Cần Thơ Express Railway	139 km (86 mi)	Standard gauge	
Da Lat–Thap Cham	127 km (79 mi)	Metre gauge	Originally established in 1932. only the last 7 km still in use; see Da Lat–Trai Mat above.
Ho Chi Minh City–Vũng Tàu	110 km (68 mi)	Metre gauge	
Dĩ An–Lộc Ninh	129 km (80 mi)	Metre gauge	Originally established in 1933, abandoned c.1959. See International links to Cambodia, below.
Mụ Giạ–Vung Ang	103 km (64 mi)	??	See International links to Laos, below.
Saigon–Mỹ Tho	87 km (54 mi)	Metre gauge	Planned to be revived as a part of Ho Chi Minh City–Cần Thơ Express Railway
Lao Cai–Hanoi–Haiphong railway	394 km (245 mi)	Standard gauge	The Vietnamese government is in talks with China about a faster railway link parallel to the existing Hanoi–Lào Cai railway. It is proposed to have an average speed of 160 kilometres per hour (99 mph) for passenger trains. The new line would half the travel time for goods, and also stop the need for transferring goods from metre gauge to standard gauge trains at the Chinese border.
Vân Đồn–Móng Cái	100 km (62 mi)		

=== Defunct lines ===
Description	Established	Length	Gauge	Notes
Phủ Lạng Thương–Lạng Sơn	1895	31 km (19 mi)	600mm	Refurbished and extended to create the Hanoi–Đồng Đăng Railway.
Cầu Giát–Nghĩa Đàn	—	30 km (19 mi)	Metre gauge	
Gia Định–Hóc Môn	??	20 km (12 mi)	??	
Tân Ấp–Thakhek	—	17.5 km (10.9 mi)	??	Line was left incomplete.
Đồng Đăng–Na Sầm	1921	15 km (9.3 mi)	Metre gauge or 600mm	
Yên Trạch–Na Dương	1966	31 km (19 mi)	Metre gauge	

=== International railway links ===
China

The railway link from Haiphong to the Chinese city of Kunming was originally built by the French administration of Indochina in the early 20th century. The section within Vietnam is 389 km long (237 km between Hanoi and the border at Lào Cai). The railway used 1,000 mm (3 ft 3 3/8 in) gauge due to the mountainous terrain along the route. Currently, the line is the only main line in China using metre gauge, (or dual gauge, since it can also be converted to standard gauge). Railway service along the Chinese portion of the route is currently suspended. Cross-border service was available until 2002, when floods and landslides, which frequently caused delays along the route, caused serious damage to the tracks on the Chinese side. The railway will form the Chinese part of the Kunming–Singapore Railway, which has been proposed many times, and which at some point was expected to be completed in 2015.

Railway access to Nanning is done through the border at Đồng Đăng, in Lạng Sơn Province. Regular service generally entails stopping at the border, changing from a Vietnamese metre-gauge train to a Chinese standard-gauge train, and continuing on to Nanning. Since 2009, a daily overnight service is available; the train departs from Hanoi's Gia Lâm Railway Station, and runs on standard-gauge tracks all the way to Nanning.

Cambodia

There is currently no railway connection between Vietnam and Cambodia. The French administration of Indochina originally built a railway from Saigon to Lộc Ninh in the 1930s, with the intent of extending it further into Cambodia. It was abandoned in 1945, at the start of the First Indochina War. A new line connecting Ho Chi Minh City to Phnom Penh, Cambodia, was proposed as part of the Kunming–Singapore Railway project, overseen by the ASEAN–Mekong Basin Development Cooperation (AMBDC). The 129 km (80 mi) Vietnamese portion of the line would begin with a junction of the North–South Railway at Dĩ An Railway Station, and would end in Lộc Ninh, Bình Phước Province, close to the Cambodian border. According to the plan established by ASEAN, this stretch is scheduled for completion by 2020.

Laos

There is currently no railway connection between Vietnam and Laos. In 2007, the Laotian Ministry of Transportation entered into discussion with Vietnam to discuss the possibility of opening a new railway line from Thakhek in Laos through the Mụ Giạ Pass to Tân Ấp Railway Station in Quảng Bình Province, connecting to the national railway at Vung Ang, a port in Hà Tĩnh Province which the Vietnamese Government plans to expand. This would revive, in part, an earlier but aborted scheme, the Thakhek - Tân Ấp railway. According to plans established by ASEAN, the line may be extended via Thakhek all the way to the Laotian capital Vientiane. Both Laos and Thailand have expressed interest in the project as a shorter export gateway to the Pacific Ocean.

== High-speed rail ==
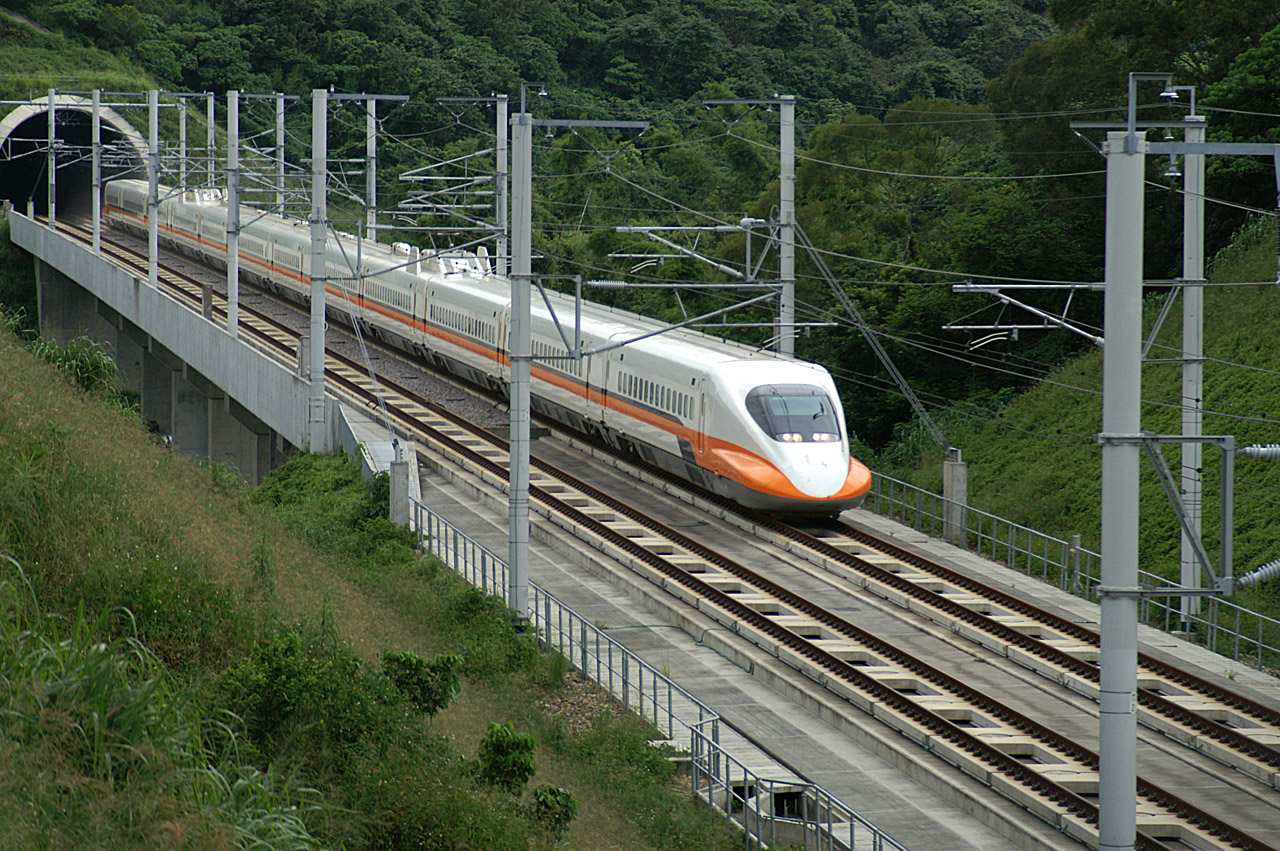
Japanese Shinkansen technology has been suggested for use in the express railway project. (Photo: Taiwan High Speed Rail)

National railway company Vietnam Railways has proposed a high-speed rail link between Hanoi and Ho Chi Minh City, capable of running at speeds of 300 km/h (186 mph). Funding for the line would come mainly from the Vietnamese government, with Japanese aid in the form of official development assistance (ODA). Current technology allows trains travelling on the current, single-track Hanoi to Ho Chi Minh City line to complete the journey in approximately thirty hours. Once completed, the high-speed rail line—using Japanese Shinkansen technology—would allow trains to complete the Hanoi–Ho Chi Minh City journey in less than six hours.

Vietnamese prime minister Nguyen Tan Dung had originally set an ambitious target, approving a 1,630 km (1,010 mi) line to be completed by 2013, with 70 percent of funding (initially estimated at US$33 billion) coming from Japanese ODA, and the remaining 30 percent raised through loans. Later reports raised estimated costs to US$56 billion (almost 60 percent of Vietnam's GDP in 2009) for a completion date in the mid-2030s. On June 19, 2010, after a month of deliberation, Vietnam's National Assembly rejected the high speed rail proposal due to its high cost; National Assembly deputies had asked for further study of the project.

However, the project North-South Express Railway now remains in works, with expectations to begin constructions by 2028-2029. Furthermore, the proposed Ho Chi Minh City–Cần Thơ express railway is also a project underway.

=== Work begins on High Speed connection to China ===
Workers began to lay tracks on China's first direct high-speed railway link to Vietnam on 8th August 2023. A track-laying machine put down a 500-meter-long track, domestic media outlet CGTN reported.

The railway between Fangchenggang and Dongxing, in South China's Guangxi Zhuang Autonomous Region, spans a distance of 46.9 kilometers (km), and has a designed speed of 200 km per hour. Infrastructure is being built with conditions to upgrade the travel speed to 250 km per hour in the future.

== Subways and light rail ==
=== Ho Chi Minh City Metro ===
A rapid transit network to serve Ho Chi Minh City was first proposed in 2001 as part of a comprehensive public transport network plan including Ho Chi Minh City and neighbouring provinces. The project is managed by the city's Management Authority for Urban Railways (MAUR), a government unit working directly under the Chairman of the People's Committee of Ho Chi Minh City. The city's plan envisages developing three monorail or light rail lines with a total length of 37 kilometres (23 mi) and six underground metro routes (1435mm gauge) with a total length of 107 kilometres (66 mi). The network's first line, connecting Bến Thành Market and Suoi Tien Park in District 9, is scheduled for completion in 2015, and a second line between Bến Thành Market and Tham Luong in District 12 is due to begin construction in August 2010, scheduled for completion in 2016. Other proposed lines include: a Bến Thành Market–Bình Tân line via Cholon; a line running from Lang Cha Ca in Tân Bình District to Van Thanh Park in Bình Thạnh District; a line connecting Thu Thiem in District 2 with Can Giuoc in District 8; and a line stretching from Ba Queo in Tân Bình District to Phu Lam in District 6.

=== Hanoi Metro ===
In July 2008, the then-Vietnamese Prime Minister Nguyễn Tấn Dũng approved an overall transport development plan for Hanoi, which, among other projects, proposed a rapid transit system with five routes (1435mm gauge). The project is being carried out by the Hanoi Metropolitan Rail Transport Project Board (HRB). As of spring 2009, projects for four lines were under consideration: the Nho–Hanoi Railway Station (the "pilot" line), the Nam Thang Long–Tran Hung Dao line, the Cat Linh–Hà Đông line, and the Yen Vien–Ngoc Hoi line. The Nho–Hanoi Railway Station, Cat Linh–Hà Đông and Yen Vien–Ngoc Hoi lines are currently in the research phase. Technical studies of the system were expected to be completed in 2009. The Japan International Cooperation Agency (JICA) has confirmed that the Nam Thang Long–Tran Hung Dao line would begin construction in mid-2011, to be completed in 2014 for full operation by 2016.

== Infrastructure ==
Most of Vietnam's railway infrastructure, including bridges, rail trucks, track beds, rolling stocks, signals and communication equipment, and maintenance facilities, has suffered severe deterioration, mainly due to damage inflicted during the Vietnam War and a subsequent lack of capital investment and maintenance. . More recently, rehabilitation projects sustained by official development assistance have allowed the most critical pieces of infrastructure along the line to be replaced, although much work still remains to be done.

=== Tracks ===
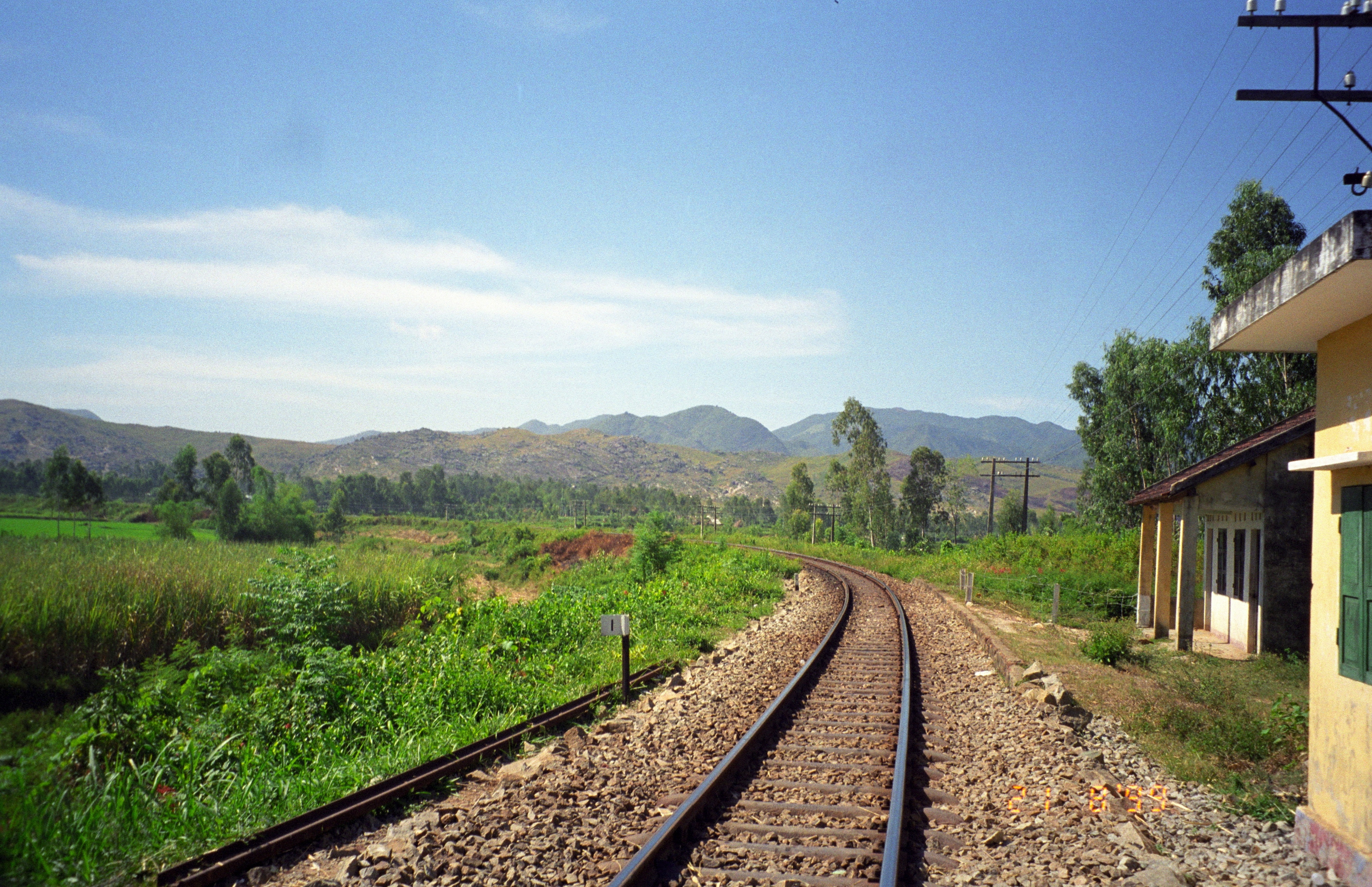
A level crossing near My Son.

Most existing Vietnamese railway lines use metre gauge, although standard gauge and mixed gauge are used northeast of Hanoi. As of 2005, approximately 2,600 km (1,600 mi) of track was in use throughout Vietnam:

- 2,169 km (1,348 mi) metre gauge (1,000 mm (3 ft 3 3/8 in));
- 178 km (111 mi) standard gauge (1,435 mm (4 ft 8 1/2 in)); and
- 253 km (157 mi) mixed gauge (1,435 mm (4 ft 8 1/2 in) and 1,000 mm (3 ft 3 3/8 in)).

Besides active tracks, around 506 km (314 mi) of tracks are in use as siding, bringing the total to 3,106 km (1,930 mi) of track laid nationwide.

=== Bridges ===
Vietnam Railways reports the number of railway bridges along the North–South line to be 1,300, totalling about 28,000 m (92,000 ft), or about 63% of the national total. Considering both standard rail bridges and combined bridges, the total length along the North–South line is about 36,000 m (118,000 ft). Many of the railway bridges were severely worn from age and sport damage dating from the Vietnam War, despite their restoration following the war. As of 2007, 278 bridges requiring major rehabilitation remain along the North–South Railway line. Throughout the entire Vietnamese rail network, Vietnam Railways reports a total of 1,790 railway bridges, with a total length of 45,368 m (148,845 ft).

=== Tunnels ===
A Vietnam Railways train passes through a tunnel north of Quy Nhon.

There are 27 railway tunnels along the North–South line, amounting to a total length of 8,335 m (27,346 ft). Throughout the entire Vietnamese rail network, Vietnam Railways report a total of 39 tunnels with a combined length of 11,512 m (37,769 ft). Certain tunnels are inadequately drained and suffer from deterioration in the tunnel lining, causing water leaks that necessitate reductions in speed.

=== Signalling ===
The North–South Railway line uses a semi-automatic block system, which allows individual signals to work either as automatic signals or manual signals. These replace the token method used in earlier years. According to a joint Japanese-Vietnamese evaluation team, the recent installation of additional auto-signal systems at key crossings along the line has contributed to a decline in railway accidents. Semaphore signals were once used throughout the Vietnamese rail network, but these are gradually being replaced with colour light signals; most of the railway lines in northern Vietnam have been converted.

According to Vietnam Railways, automatic warning systems have been installed at 230 level crossings throughout the country.

=== Communications ===
Since 1998, microband Asynchronous Transfer Mode technology has been used along the North–South Railway line to send television signals; 64 kbit/s transmission lines are leased from the Vietnam Post and Telecommunications Corporation (VPTC). Along some sections of the line—for example, from Hanoi to Vinh and from Nha Trang to Ho Chi Minh City—a fiber-optic network has been deployed; Vietnam Railways intends to extend the network along the remaining distance from Vinh to Nha Trang. A switching system featuring digital exchanges is in place, connected via the existing transmission system and the public telephone network. As the modernization of the telecommunication system progresses, manual exchanges are gradually being replaced with digital exchanges.

=== Sewers ===
The Vietnamese rail network includes 4,860 sewers, with a total length of 71,439 m (234,380 ft).

== Safety ==
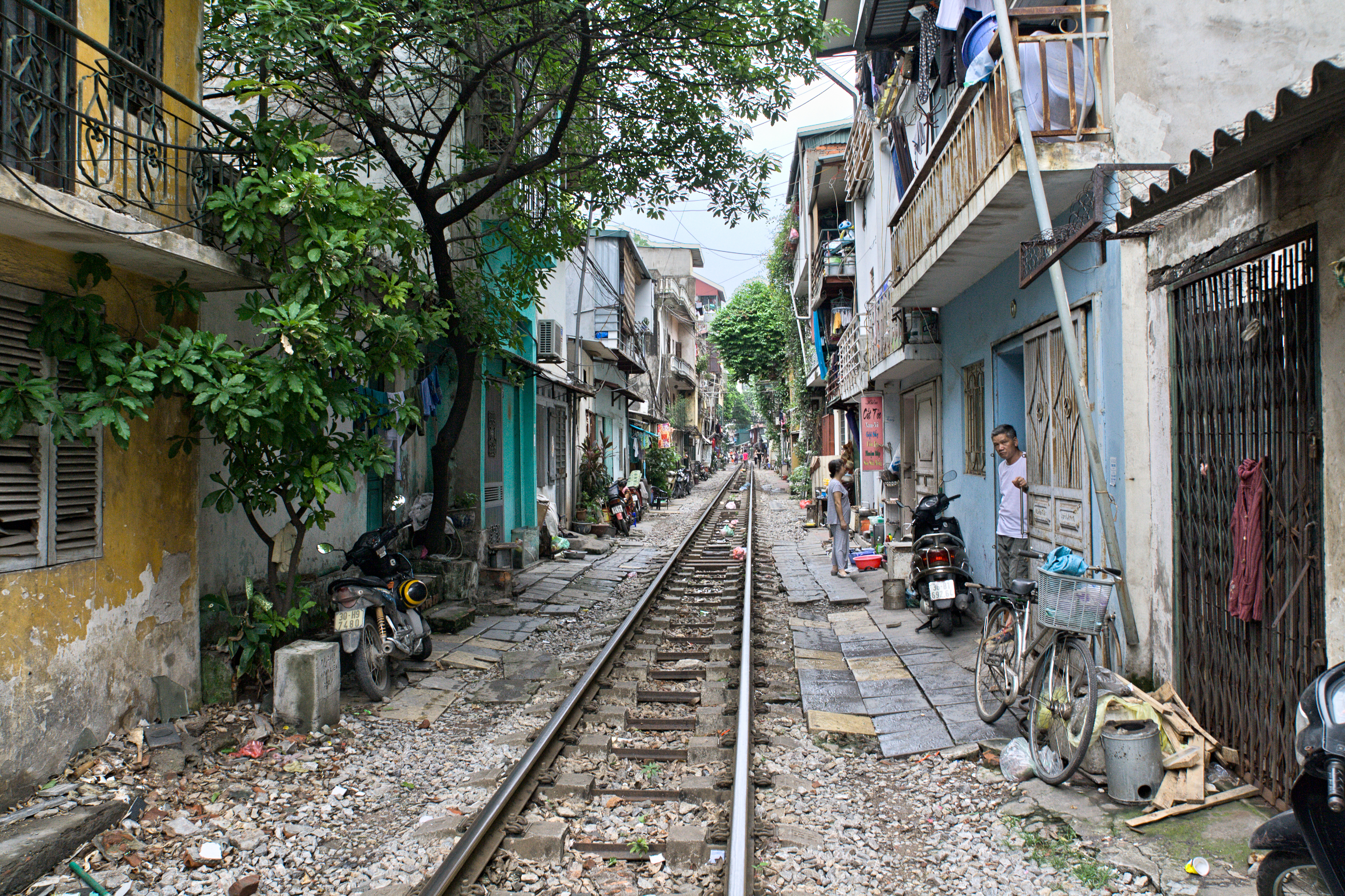
Residences directly adjacent to railway tracks in Hanoi.

The overall condition of railway infrastructure in Vietnam varies from poor to fair; most of the network remains in need of rehabilitation and upgrading, having received only temporary repair from damages suffered during decades of war. A joint Japanese-Vietnamese evaluation team found that the poor state of railway infrastructure was the fundamental cause for most railway accidents, of which the most common types are train crashes against vehicles and persons, especially at illegal level crossings; derailments caused by failure to decrease speed were also noted as a common cause of accidents.

The Vietnamese railway network is crossed by many roads in several crowded areas; as a result, accidents involving vehicles and pedestrians have occurred. In the first 10 months of 2009, 431 railway accidents reportedly took place throughout Vietnam, causing 166 casualties and injuring 319 people. A researcher from Villanova University noted "There are numerous safety issues with level crossings...usually, an accident occurs every day." Many rail bridges and tunnels have suffered deterioration since the 1970s, requiring trains passing over or through them to reduce speeds as low as 15 km/h (9.3 mph). In addition, the center of the country is subject to violent annual flooding and bridges are often swept away, causing lengthy closures.

Along with recent efforts aimed at infrastructure rehabilitation, the recent adoption of safety measures by Vietnam Railways has led to a decline in railway accidents. These measures include: public awareness campaigns on railway safety in the media; construction of fences and safety barriers at critical level crossings in major cities; mobilization of volunteers for traffic control at train stations and level crossings, especially during holiday seasons; the installation of additional auto-signal systems; and the construction of flyovers and underpasses to redirect traffic.

== Railway management ==
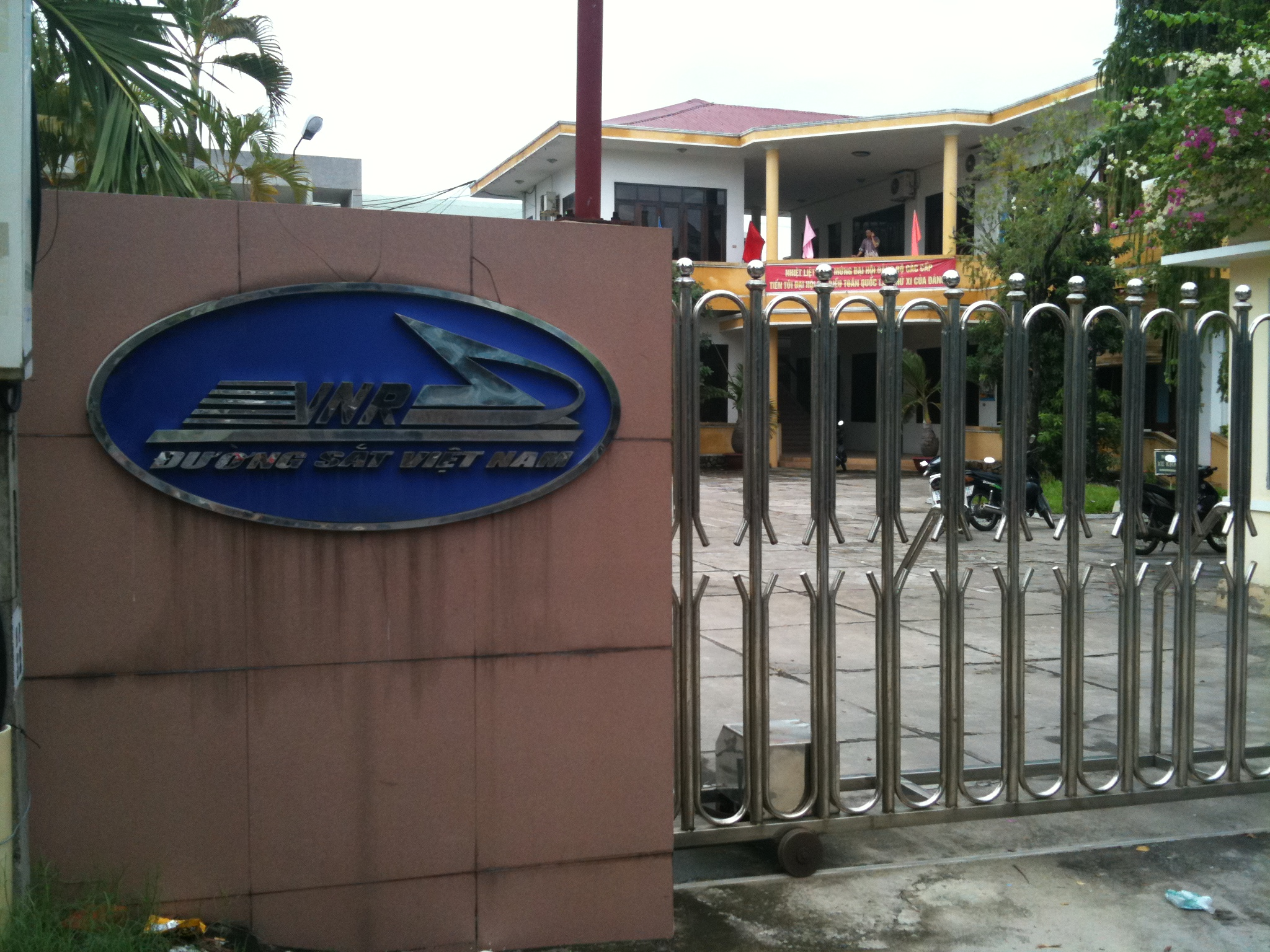
The Da Nang branch office of Vietnam Railways.

The Vietnamese railway network is owned and operated by the state-owned enterprise Vietnam Railways (VNR), which operates a number of different subsidiaries involved in construction, communications, training, and other activities connected to railway maintenance. Following the end of the Vietnam War in 1975, the newly reunified Vietnamese railway network was centrally managed by the precursor of VNR, the government's Department of Railways. Initially, low rail tariffs and the poor state of infrastructure used in other modes of transport led to high usage, but revenue proved to be insufficient to cover the railway's operating costs. In 1986, the Government's implementation of Doi Moi economic reforms led to the deregulation of the transport sector and the shift towards a market-led economy, forcing the railways to change in order to maintain a competitive edge. The Department of Railways was reorganized into Vietnam Railways (Vietnamese: Đường sắt Việt Nam) in 1989; since that time, railway reform has passed through a number of stages. Responsibility for rail infrastructure and operations were separated by government decree in 1994. The government of Germany began providing assistance with the restructuring of the railway sector in 2000, allowing VNR to improve the efficiency and effectiveness of its operations, thus increasing its competitiveness. In 2003, VNR was re-organized as a state corporation, the Vietnam Railway Corporation, operating in railway transport and related services; railway administration and infrastructure management were given to the Vietnam Railway Administration, under the authority of the Ministry of Transport. A Railway Law was passed by the National Assembly on 19 May 2005; although regulations for the law's implementation have yet to be issued, it does provide a strong basis for further sector development; among other things, it proposed that foreign investors be invited to invest in Vietnam Railways.

== See also ==
- Transport in Vietnam
- Ho Chi Minh City Metro
- Gia Lam Train Company
- Vietnam Railways
- State Railway of Thailand and Rail transport in Cambodia (1m gauge)
- Rail transport in Laos, and Rail transport in China (1.435mm gauge)

== Notes and references ==
Notes

Bibliography

- Hulot, Frédéric. Les chemins de fer de la France d'outre-mer, tome 1 l'Indochine, le Yunnan. La Régordane. 1990.
- Adolf Dannehl (19 March 1999), "Zugforderung und lokomotiven in Vietnam", Eisenbahningenieur (in German), 50 (2): 70–72, ISSN 0013-2810
- Тяговый подвижной состав железных дорог Вьетнама, Железные Дороги Мира (in Russian) (1), 2000
