= Da Lat–Thap Cham railway =

Railway line in Vietnam

Coordinates: 11.94326°N 108.45701°E

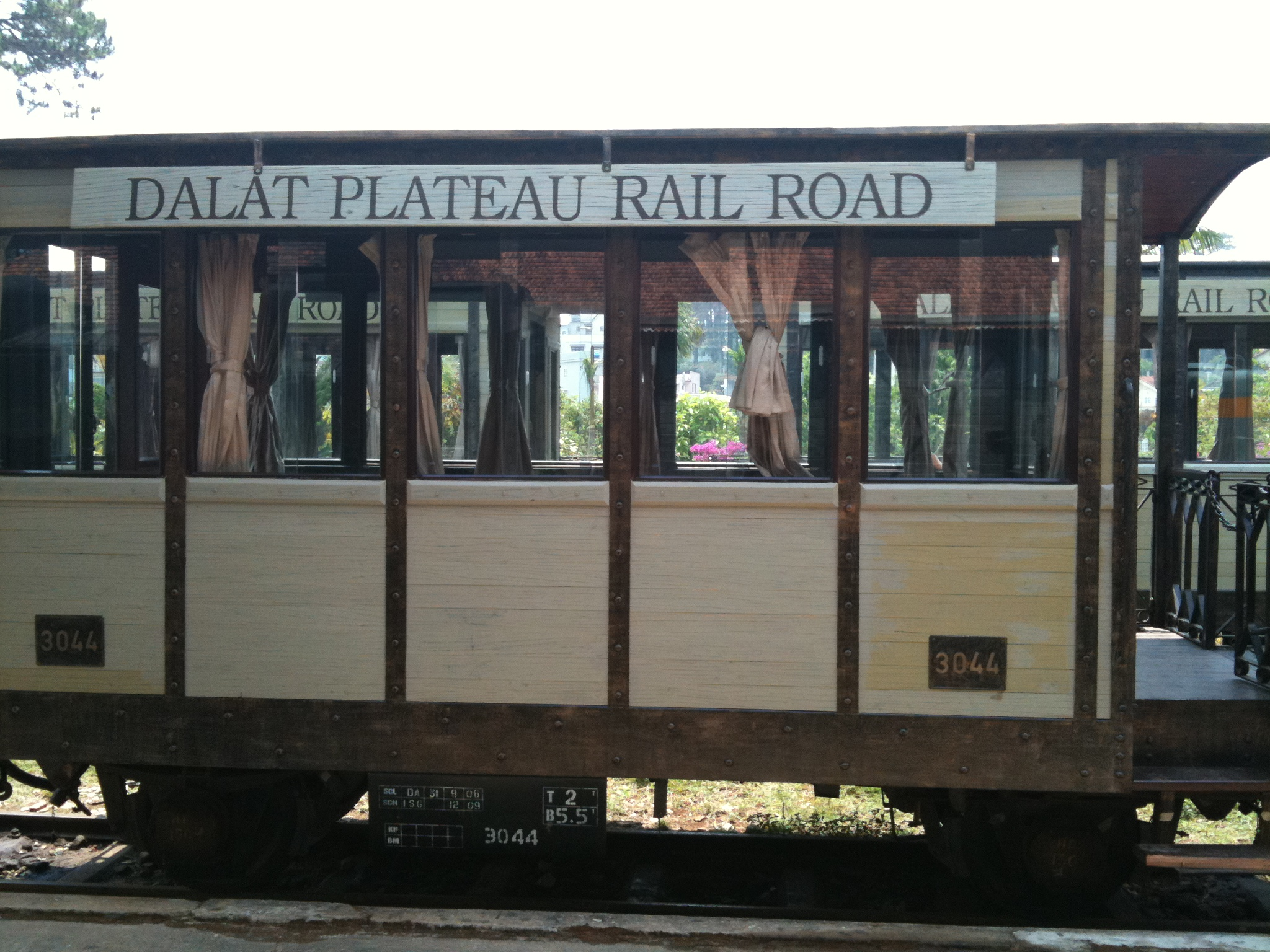
Refurbished rail cars at Da Lat station, now operated as a tourist attraction

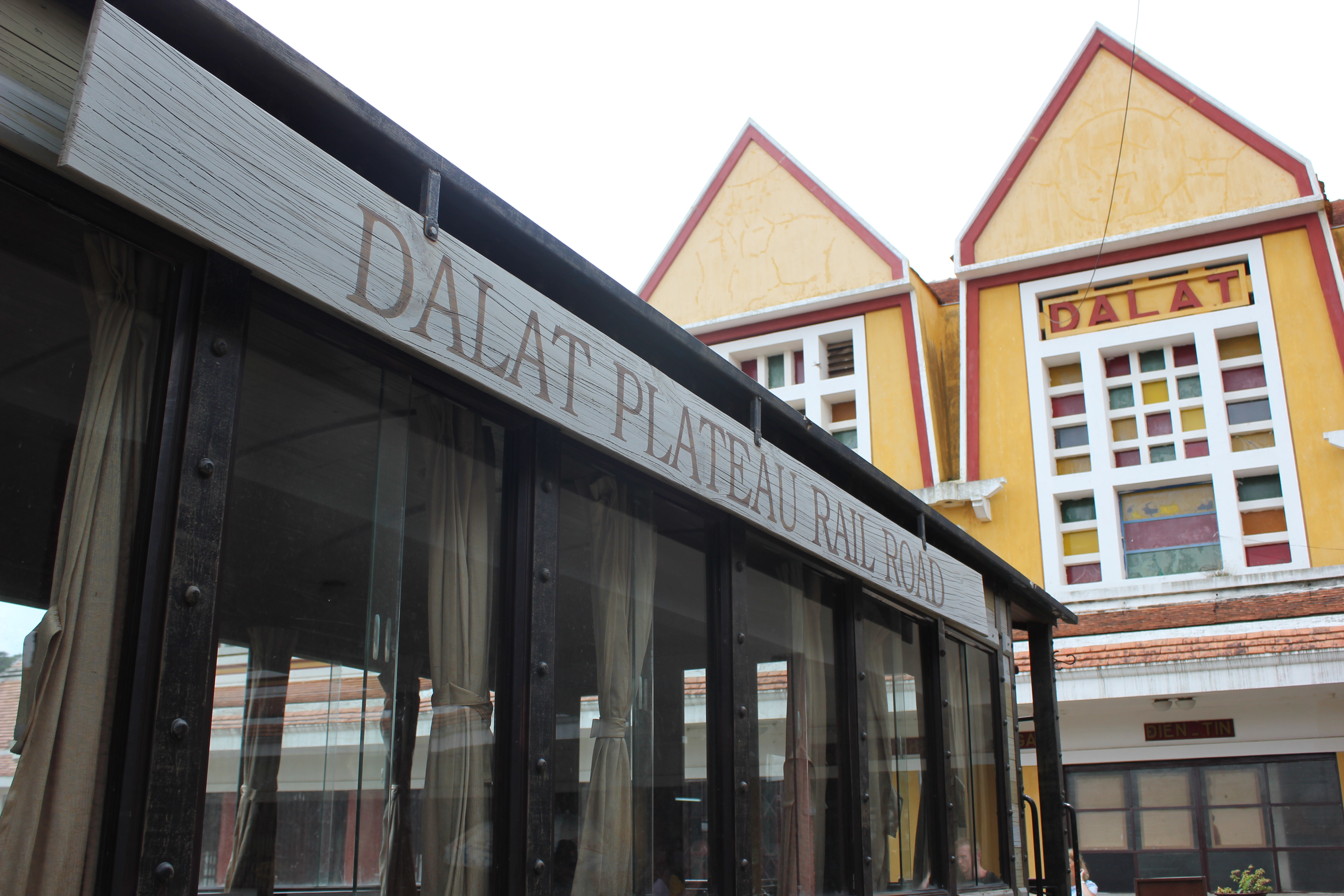
Da Lat station from another point of view

The Da Lat–Thap Cham railway (Vietnamese: Đường sắt Tháp Chàm-Đà Lạt) or Da Lat-Phan Rang railway (Vietnamese: Đường sắt Phan Rang-Đà Lạt) was an 84 km (52 mi) rack railway connecting the Vietnamese city of Da Lat to the main North–South railway at Tháp Chàm in Ninh Thuận Province. It was established by the French administration of Indochina in 1932 after thirty years of construction in phases, beginning in 1903. The first section, running 41 km (25 mi) from Tháp Chàm to Sông Pha, opened in 1919, and the second section, running 43 km (27 mi) from Song Pha to Da Lat, opened in 1932. Due to the mountainous terrain, the Sông Pha–Da Lat section used rack rails in three sections, and included five tunnels. The Da Lat–Tháp Chàm railway is occasionally referred to as a Crémaillère railway, referring to the French word for the rack used on its rails.

Abandoned during the Vietnam War, the line was gradually dismantled after the North Vietnamese victory in 1975, its infrastructure being used to repair the heavily damaged North–South railway line. In the 1990s, a 7 km (4.3 mi) section of the line between Da Lat Railway Station and the nearby village of Trại Mát was restored and returned to active use as a tourist attraction; it remains active as of 2023. Restored railway cars now carry the name "Dalat Plateau Rail Road", although this name was not used when the entire line was in use. A proposed renewal project, backed by provincial and local governments, aims to restore the entire Đà Lạt–Tháp Chàm railway to handle both passenger and simple light cargo transportation. It is currently believed that the central government will need to fund the project in its entirety, due to the economics of running a tourist train line.

== History ==
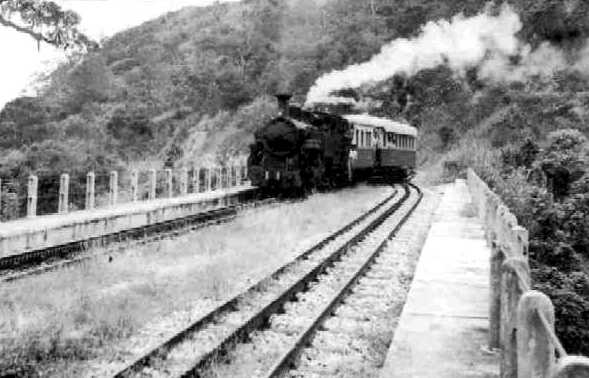
A locomotive travels on the Đà Lạt–Tháp Chàm line

The Da Lat–Thap Cham railway was an adaptation of plans devised by Paul Doumer during his tenure as Governor-General of French Indochina from 1897 to 1902. Approved by the French administration in 1898, Doumer's ambitious plans included several railway lines, including the Yunnan–Vietnam railway connecting the coastal town of Haiphong to the city of Kunming in the Chinese province of Yunnan, and the North–South railway connecting Hanoi and Saigon. Doumer's original plans called for several more branch lines to connect different parts of Indochina, including a link from Quy Nhơn to Kon Tum in the Central Highlands, along with branch lines leading from Quang Tri province to Savannakhet in Laos, and from Saigon to Phnom Penh in Cambodia. None of these other lines were ever implemented in their entirety, although the Hanoi–Dong Dang line later allowed for rail connections to Guangxi, and the first 17 km (11 mi) of the Tan Ap—Thakhek line into Laos were built before construction was abandoned. Doumer's plans were adapted, however, to provide a railway link connecting Da Lat and Tháp Chàm in Ninh Thuận Province, at a cost of 200 million francs.

=== Construction ===
Swiss engineers, who had experience at building zigzag railways for use on steep slopes, were hired to complete the line. Initial surveys took place in 1898, and construction began on the Tháp Chàm–Sông Pha section in 1908. By 1913, tracks had reached the town of Tân Mỹ, and the first trains began to use this portion of the line. The rest of the Tháp Chàm–Sông Pha section opened in 1919, completing the first phase of construction.

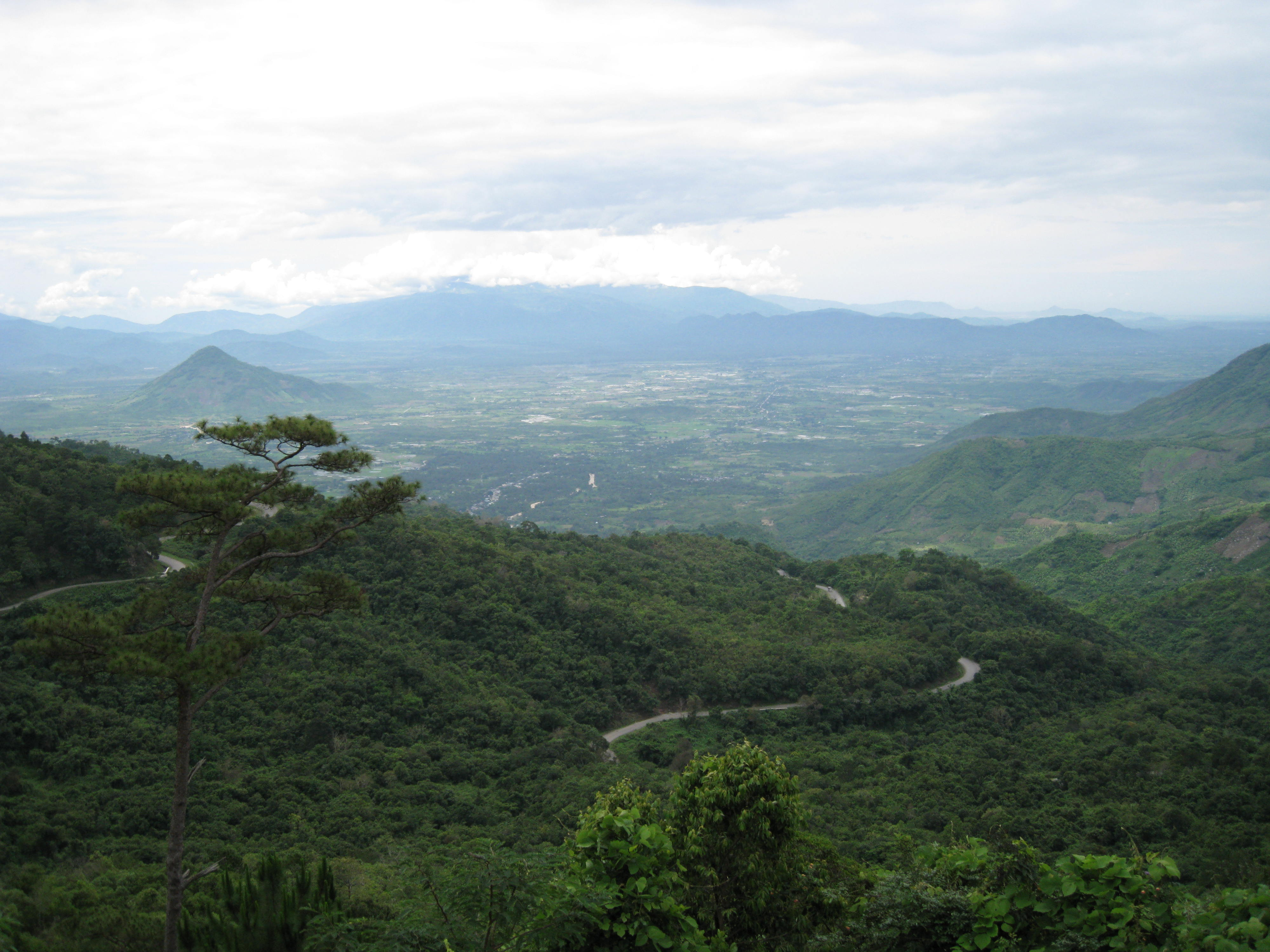
The Ngoan Muc Pass, along which the railway travelled

The second phase took comparatively more time to complete, due to the mountainous terrain inland from Sông Pha (Krongpha). Although the following section, from Sông Pha to Eo Gio (Bellevue), was only 10 km (6.2 mi) long on a map, its steep grade (120‰) required the use of a rack and pinion system. The Sông Pha–Eo Gio section was completed in 1928. The next section, from Eo Gio to Đơn Dương (Dran), was relatively flat, and was completed in 1929. From Đơn Dương to Tram Hanh (Arbre Broyé), another length of rack rails was laid, this time with a grade of 115‰ and with a more meandering route than previously; this section was completed in 1930. The remaining distance from Tram Hanh to Da Lat was said to be the most difficult, as it crossed the Lam Vien Plateau, 1,500 m (4,900 ft) above sea level. The terrain was again relatively flat from Tram Hanh to Da Tho (Le Bosquet), but required the construction of three railway tunnels; finally, the Da Tho–Trai Mat section, which was the final rack rail section with a grade of 60‰, was laid down; the railway tracks finally reached Da Lat in 1932. The section linking Sông Pha to Da Lat was only 43 km (27 mi) long, but rose almost 1,400 metres (4,600 ft) along a winding route with three rack rail sections and five tunnels. Da Lat Railway Station, one of the first colonial-style buildings to be built in the area, was completed in 1938.

=== Abandonment ===
After Vietnam was divided in 1954, this section of railway came under the ownership of South Vietnam. Throughout the Vietnam War, the entire Vietnamese railway network was a target of bombardments and sabotage by both North Vietnamese and South Vietnamese forces. The Da Lat-Tháp Chàm line was no exception; plagued by sabotage and mining by the Viet Cong, the line gradually fell out of use, with regular operations coming to an end in 1968. South Vietnamese Air Vietnam in 1974 had 16 cargo planes transporting fresh vegetables from Da Lat to the capital city of Saigon when the railway had completely stopped operating since 1972.

With the Fall of Saigon on 30 April 1975, the Communist government of North Vietnam unified the country and took control of the former South Vietnamese railway. Heavily damaged by bombing and sabotage by both North Vietnamese and South Vietnamese forces and their allies, the war-torn North–South railway line was returned to service on 31 December 1976, promoted as a symbol of Vietnamese unity. Many abandoned railway lines—such as the Da Lat-Tháp Chàm line—were dismantled to provide materials for the repair of the main line; unused materials were sold as scrap metal.

=== Restoration ===
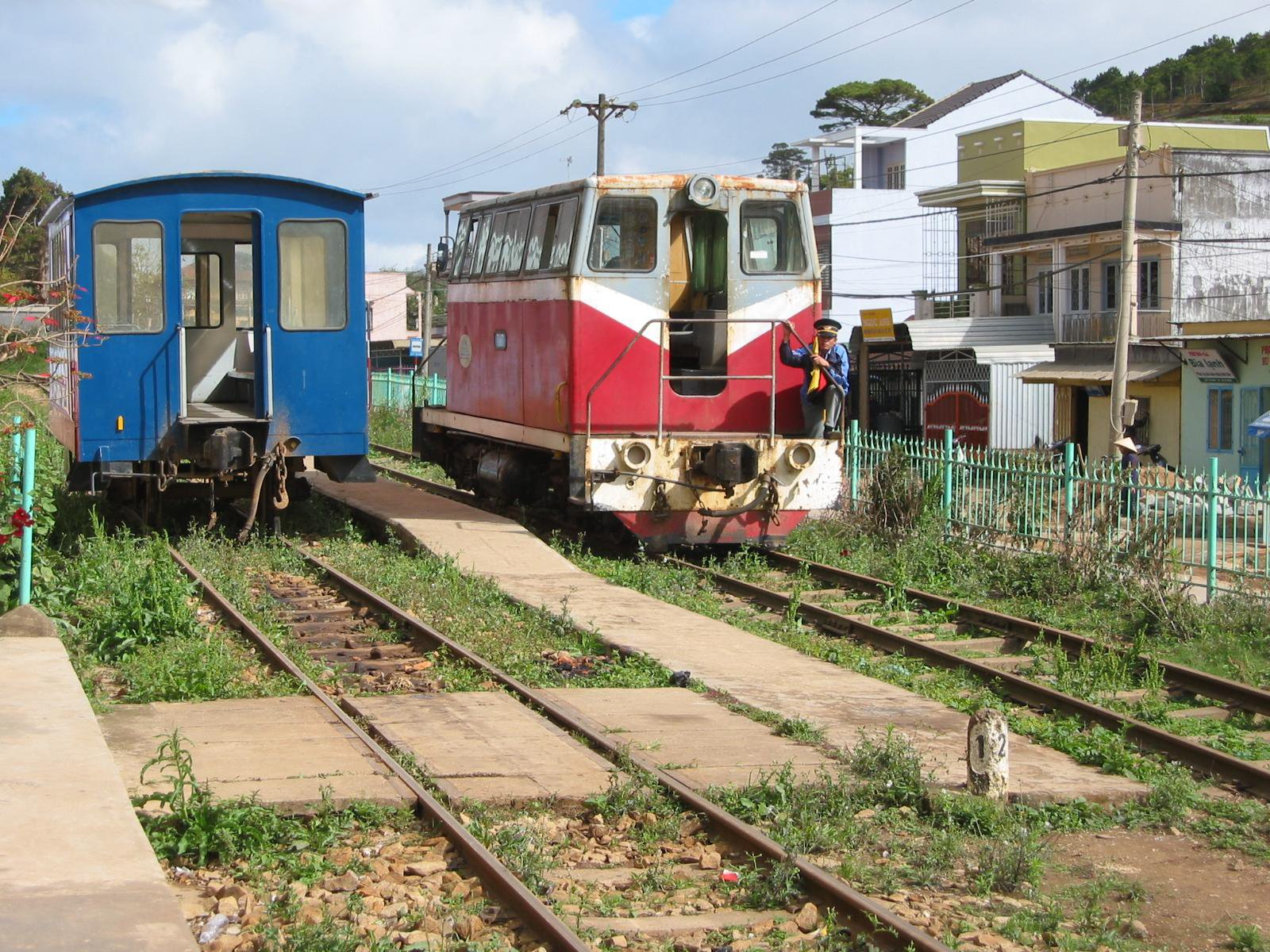
A diesel locomotive prepares for its return trip at Trại Mát station.

In the 1990s, a 7 km (4.3 mi) section of the line between Da Lat station and the nearby village of Trại Mát was restored and returned to active use as a tourist attraction. A planning document released later, in 2002, listed the restoration of the entire Đà Lạt–Tháp Chàm railway as a priority for infrastructure development for Đà Lạt and Lâm Đồng Province, including the upgrading of Da Lat station and other stations along the routes to handle passenger and cargo transportation. The proposed renewal received the backing of provincial and local governments, and the national government indicated that private companies would also be allowed to participate in the reconstruction of the railway. The project would also include a connection to the North–South railway at Tháp Chàm, allowing trains to circulate between Da Lat and the rest of the country for the first time since the Vietnam War. In December 2009, four rail cars restored to look like the rail cars used on the Da Lat–Tháp Chàm line in the 1930s were put into use on the Da Lat–Trại Mát tourist railroad, carrying signage reading "Dalat Plateau Rail Road".

== Stations ==
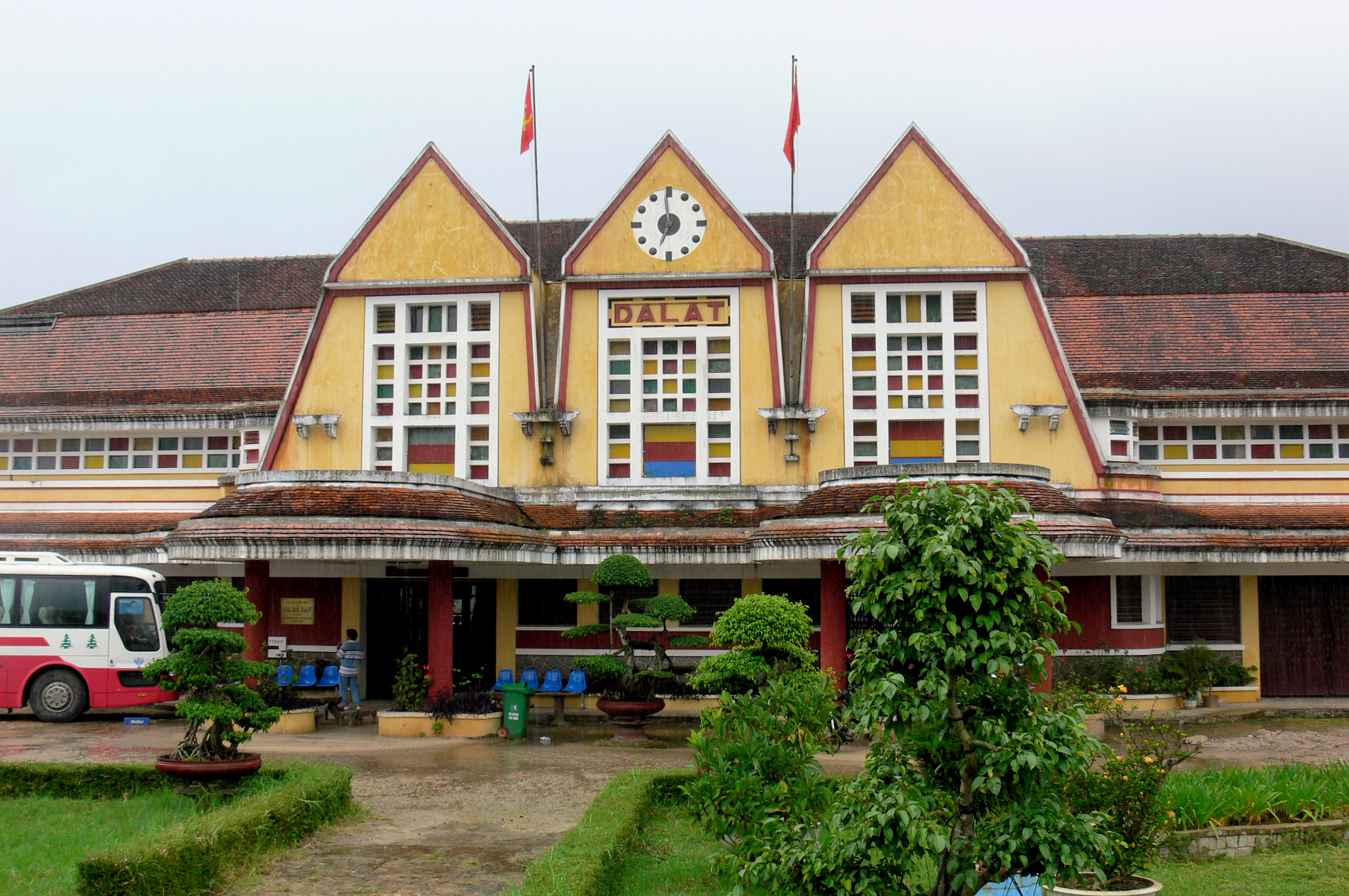
Da Lat station

Da Lat station, built in 1938, was designed in Art Deco style by French architects Moncet and Reveron, although it incorporates the high, pointed roofs characteristic of the Cao Nguyen communal buildings of Vietnam's Central Highlands. The three gables, said to represent the three peaks of Dalat's iconic Lang Biang mountain, are also reminiscent of Normandy's Trouville-Deauville Station. The station's unique design—with its roofs, arching ceiling, and coloured-glass windows—earned it recognition as a national historical monument in 2001. Several of the stations along the line share a design similar to Da Lat station.

Km	Station	City/district/ward	Altitude	Notes	Map
0	Tháp Chàm	Phan Rang–Tháp Chàm	32 m (105 ft) (Note: At Phan Rang Air Base.)	For North–South railway	map
22	Tân Mỹ	Tân Mỹ			
41	Sông Pha	Sông Pha	186 m (610 ft)	aka Krongpha	map
47	Co Bo	Co Bo	663 m (2,175 ft)	aka K'Beu, on the Ngoan Muc Pass	map
51	Eo Gio	Eo Gio	991 m (3,251 ft)	aka Bellevue, on the Ngoan Muc Pass	map
56	Đơn Dương	Đơn Dương	1,016 m (3,333 ft)	aka Dran	map
62	Tram Hanh	Tram Hanh	1,514 m (4,967 ft)	aka Arbre Broyé	map
66	Cau Dat	Cau Dat	1,466 m (4,810 ft)	aka Entrerays	map
72	Da Tho	Da Tho	1,402 m (4,600 ft)	aka Le Bosquet	map
77	Trai Mat	Trai Mat	1,550 m (5,090 ft)		map
84	Da Lat	Ward 10, Da Lat	1,488 m (4,882 ft)		map

== Infrastructure ==
The mountainous terrain along the Da Lat–Thap Cham line required the construction of three rack-railway sections and five tunnels. In total, 34 km (21 mi) of rack rails were laid. The first section, from Song Pha to Eo Gio, had a grade of 120‰ (12% or 1 in 8.33). The second section, from Don Duong to Tram Hanh, had a grade of 115‰ (11.5% or 8.33). The third, and final, section, between Da Tho and Trai Mat, had a grade of 60‰ (6% or 1 in 16.67). Two tunnels were built along the first rack rail section between Sông Pha and Eo Gio: one, with a length of 163 m (535 ft), between Sông Pha and Co Bo (K'Beu), and the other, with a length of 70 m (230 ft), between Co Bo and Eo Gio. The next tunnel was the longest, stretching 630 m (2,070 ft) somewhere between Tram Hanh and Cau Dat. Finally, two more tunnels were built between Cau Dat and Da Tho, the first measuring 98 m (322 ft) and the second measuring 129 m (423 ft). Telegraph poles were also built along the line.

== Locomotives ==
=== Steam ===
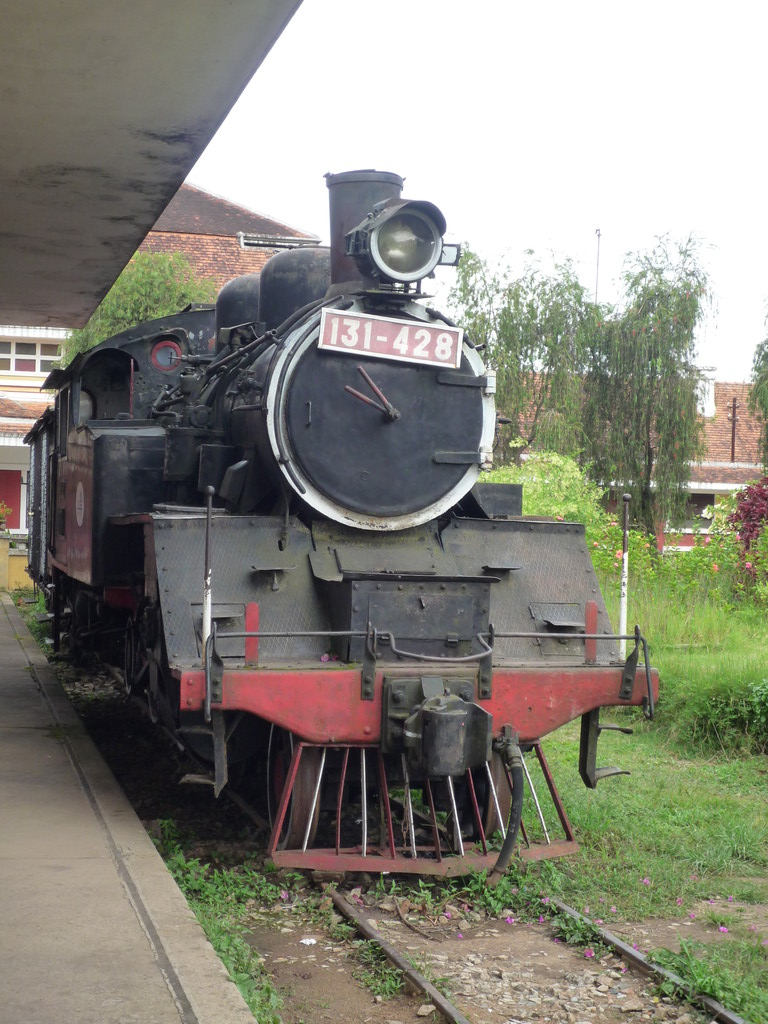
A steam locomotive at Da Lat station

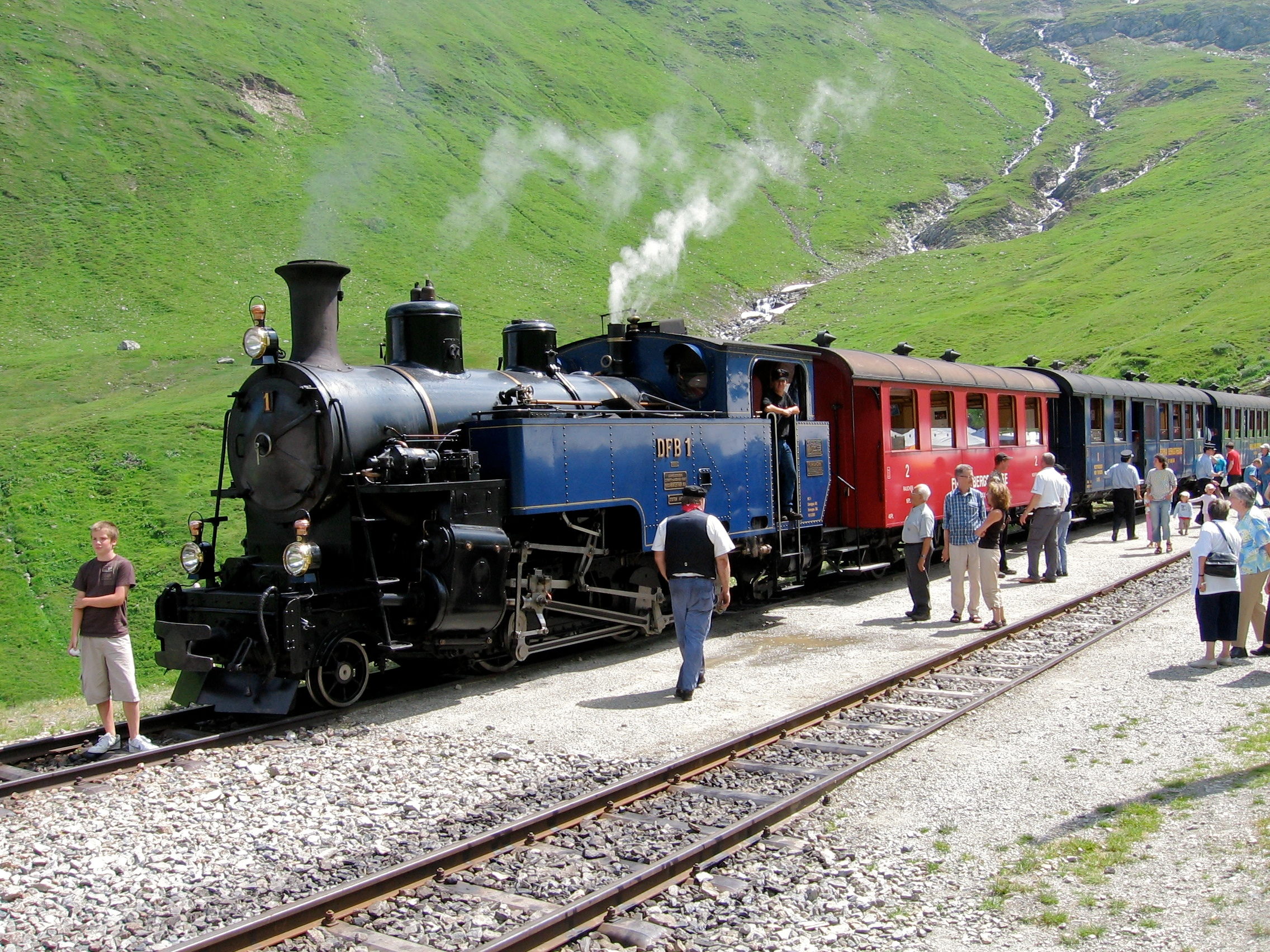
Furka Dampfbahn number 1 which was VHX 31-201 in between

Soon after the first part of the railway line was opened, the French Compagnie Des Chemins De Fer De L'Indochine (CFI) set about importing cogwheel locomotives that could be used also on rack sections. CFI initially purchased five HG 4/4-type (Note: Narrow gauge, with a mix of adhesion and rack-rail drive, 4 drive axles, 4 total axles.) locomotives in 1924 from Swiss manufacturer SLM Winterthur (German: Schweizerische Lokomotiv- und Maschinenfabrik). 1929 two locomotives followed from German manufacturer ME (German: Maschinenfabrik Esslingen), built after the Swiss plans as a so-called "Reparationsleistung". In 1930 SLM delivered another two locomotive, bringing the effective to nine. These locomotives were delivered as numbers 301 through 309 and later were given the serial numbers CFI 40-301 through CFI 40-309. Four locomotives (301, 305, 307 and 309) were destroyed during World War II during the Japanese occupation of Indochina. 1947 it was possible to purchase four similar but slightly less powerful locomotives from the Swiss Furka-Oberalp company which had electrified its lines a few years ago. These were HG 3/4-type (Note: Narrow gauge, with a mix of adhesion and rack-rail drive, 3 drive axles, 4 total axles.) locomotives (given serial numbers CFI 31-201 through 31-204). The locomotives were transferred to a Vietnamese railway company, Vietnam Hoa Xa, after the dissolution of French Indochina; the serial numbers remained the same, but with VHX rather than CFI as a prefix. The locomotives functioned on steam, generating a pulling power of 600–820 cv.

The remains of the Furka-Oberalp steam locomotives were repurchased by the Swiss Furka Heritage Railway together with the two locomotives 40-304 and 40-308. It was intended to use them on the restored original Furka rack line. Two locomotives (31-201 and 31-204) were returned to active service with their original numbers 1 and 9.

Number on delivery	CFI/VHX number	Year built	Builder number	History	Today
701	40-301	1924	SLM 2937	destroyed during World War II	-
702	40-302	1924	SLM 2938	1967 damaged in the war, remains in Cau Dat	?
703	40-303	1924	SLM 2939		?
704	40-304	1924	SLM 2940	1990 brought to Switzerland from Da Lat	restored to working condition.
705	40-305	1924	SLM 2941	destroyed during World War II	-
706	40-306	1929	ME 4227	Thap Cham, parts 1997 to Switzerland	?
707	40-307	1929	ME 4228	destroyed during World War II	-
708	40-308	1930	SLM 3413	1990 brought to Switzerland from Da Lat	restored to working condition.
709	40-309	1930	SLM 3414	destroyed during World War II	-
BFD/FO HG 3/4 1	31-201	1913	SLM 2315	1947 to Vietnam; 1990 back from Da Lat, 1993 restored to running condition	DFB 1 "Furkahorn"
BFD/FO HG 3/4 2	31-202	1913	SLM 2316	1947 to Vietnam; 1990 back from Sông Pha in parts	stored DFB for parts
BFD/FO HG 3/4 8	31-203	1914	SLM 2418	1947 to Vietnam; 1990 back from Tháp Chàm in parts	stored DFB for parts
BFD/FO HG 3/4 9	31-204	1914	SLM 2419	1947 to Vietnam; 1990 back from Da Lat in parts, 1993 restored to running condition	DFB 9 "Gletschhorn"

=== Diesel ===
- Diesel locomotive TU7A
- Diesel locomotive TU8P - removed circa 2019

== See also ==
- Rail transport in Vietnam

== Notes and references ==
Notes

Bibliography

- Nguyễn Tấn Dũng (2002-05-27). "Ratifying the Readjusted General Planning of Da Lat City, Lam Dong Province, and its Adjacent Areas to 2020". AsianLII.
- "Mekong Express Maps". Rick Stauffer. 2007-04-17. Archived from the original on 2010-08-08.
