= Ho Chi Minh City–Cần Thơ express railway =

Proposed railway line in Vietnam

Ho Chi Minh City–Can Tho express railway

Overview
- Status: On hold
- Locale: Vietnam
- Termini: Tân Kiên station; Cái Răng station

Service
- Services: not available
- Operator: Vietnam Railway Corporation

Technical
- Line length: 139 km (86 mi)
- Track gauge: 1,435 mm (4 ft 8 1/2 in) standard gauge
- Operating speed: 200 km/h (120 mph)

The Ho Chi Minh City–Cần Thơ express railway (Vietnamese: Đường sắt cao tốc Thành phố Hồ Chí Minh - Cần Thơ) is a proposed high speed railway in Vietnam. The line would begin in Ho Chi Minh City, crossing provinces and municipalities of Ho Chi Minh City, Tây Ninh, Đồng Tháp, Vĩnh Long, Cần Thơ. The rail line would connect Southeast Vietnam and Mekong Delta. The total proposed length would be 139 kilometres (86 mi).

Canada's MorFund Financial Inc. will contribute 6.3 billion Canadian dollars (US$5 billion) in this high-speed railway. The public-private partnership (PPP) has been formalized in a memorandum of understanding signed between MorFund Financial Inc. and Phuong Nam Science and Technology Institute (PNSTI), which was in charge of the project. PNSTI said that the investment deal was the last legal step needed to a complete feasibility report on the project, which would be submitted to the Ministry of Transport, the head administrator and the lawmaking National Assembly (Vietnam) soon for endorsement. Construction on the high-speed rail is expected to start in late 2018 and promise a travel time of 45 minutes between Ho Chi Minh City and Can Tho.

The PNSTI and Southern Transport Engineer Designing (TEDI South) has planned the project for five years with the proficient help from local specialists. The up-and-coming high-speed rail will run 139 kilometers from Tan Kien metro station in Ho Chi Minh City to Cai Cui port in Can Tho with stops in Long An, Tien Giang, and Vinh Long provinces. They are also planning to develop new urban areas. Each stop will have its own industrial park, residential neighborhoods, schools, hospitals, and supermarkets. The passenger high-speed train will run 200 kilometers per hour and take approximately 45 minutes to venture to every part of the whole length of the course. As indicated by Prof. Dr. Tran Cong Hoang Quoc Trang, leader of PNSTI, the Canadian Consulate General in Ho Chi Minh City has sworn to give proficient and specialized help to project development with its modern rail technologies expertise. At the moment the Mekong Delta region in Southern Vietnam is not associated with the nation's north–south railroad network which has its last station in Ho Chi Minh City. Traveling by road from Ho Chi Minh City to Can Tho takes roughly three and a half hours.

== Stations ==
- Tân Kiên station
- Bến Lức station
- Tân An station
- Trung Lương station
- Cai Lậy station
- Cái Bè station
- Mỹ Thuận station
- Vĩnh Long station
- Bình Minh station
- Cái Răng station

== See also ==
- Transport in Vietnam
- Rail transport in Vietnam
- North–South express railway
