= Lao Cai–Hanoi–Haiphong railway =

Railway under construction in Vietnam

Overview
- Native name: Đường sắt Lào Cai - Hà Nội - Hải Phòng
- Status: Planned
- Locale: Northern Vietnam
- Termini: Lào Cai; Lach Huyen Port Gia Lâm (branch)
- Stations: 32

Service
- Type: Conventional

History
- Planned opening: 2030

Technical
- Line length: 363 km (226 mi); 63 km (39 mi) (branch lines)
- Number of tracks: 1 (2 in Hanoi - Haiphong section)
- Track gauge: 1,435 mm (4 ft 8 1/2 in) standard gauge
- Operating speed: 160 km/h (99 mph); 120 km/h (75 mph) (Hanoi section); 80 km/h (50 mph) (minor sections)

The Lao Cai–Hanoi–Haiphong railway (Vietnamese: Đường sắt Lào Cai - Hà Nội - Hải Phòng) is a 363 km standard gauge conventional railway under construction in Vietnam connecting the provinces and cities of Lào Cai, Phú Thọ, Hanoi, Bắc Ninh, Hưng Yên, and Haiphong. The project is intended to improve passenger and freight transport between northwestern Vietnam, the capital region, and the northern seaports. Its total investment id VND 289,339 billion.

== Route ==
The design speed varies by section:

- Lào Cai–South Haiphong: 160 km/h;
- Hanoi railway hub: 120 km/h; and
- Other sections: 80 km/h.

The Bắc Hồng–Nam Haiphong section and the Yên Viên–Gia Lâm section will be newly constructed or upgraded as double-track railways using the standard 1,435 mm gauge.

== See also ==
- List of railway lines in Vietnam
