= Lâm Sơn =

Lâm Sơn Xã Lâm Sơn Sông Pha
- Commune and village
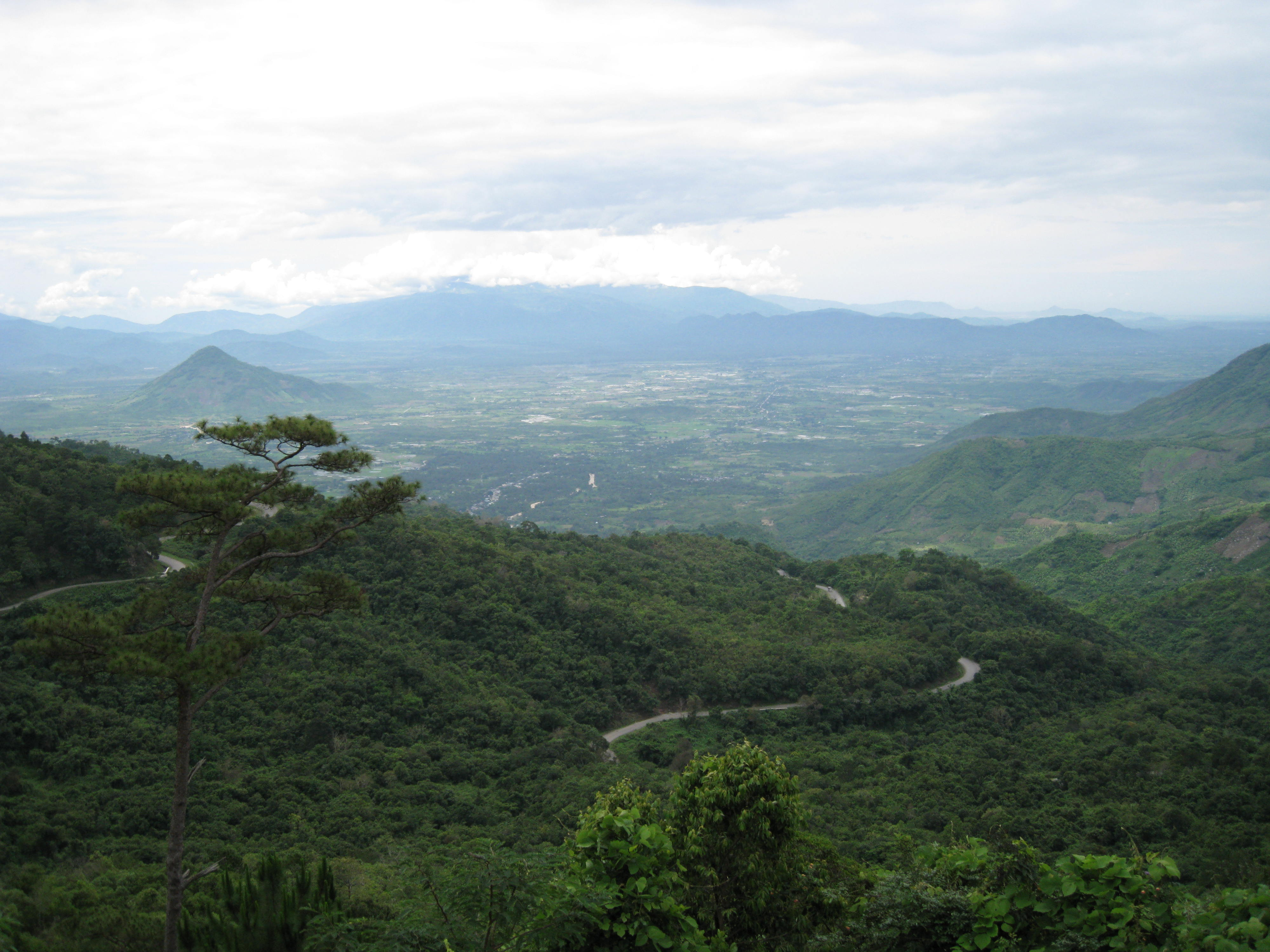
- Ngoạn Mục Pass

- Location in Vietnam
- Coordinates: 11°49′40″N 108°41′47″E
- Country: Vietnam
- Province: Khánh Hòa Province

Area
  - Total: 57.55 sq mi (149.06 km^{2})
- Elevation: 725 ft (221 m)

Population (2019)
  - Total: 12,254
  - Density: 210/sq mi (82/km^{2})
- Time zone: UTC+07:00

Lâm Sơn is a commune (xã) and village of Khánh Hòa Province, Vietnam. It is one of the 65 new wards, communes and special zones of the province following the reorganization in 2025.

On June 16, 2025, the Standing Committee of the National Assembly issued Resolution No. 1667/NQ-UBTVQH15 on the arrangement of commune-level administrative units in Khánh Hòa province in 2025. Accordingly, the entire natural area and population of Lương Sơn Commune and Lâm Sơn Commune (Ninh Sơn district) were merged to form a new commune named Lâm Sơn Commune.

The commune lies along Highway 27A, about 40 kilometres (25 mi) northwest of Phan Rang–Tháp Chàm. It is located at the foot of the scenic Ngoạn Mục Pass (locally known as the Sông Pha Pass).

Lâm Sơn was once connected to the Vietnamese railway network by the now-defunct Da Lat–Thap Cham Railway. The railway heading seaward to Thap Cham was opened in 1919, and the section inland to Da Lat opened in 1932. Due to the mountainous terrain inland from Song Pha, that section used rack rails, the only such railway in Vietnam.
