= Gò Vấp station =

Railway station in Vietnam

Gò Vấp
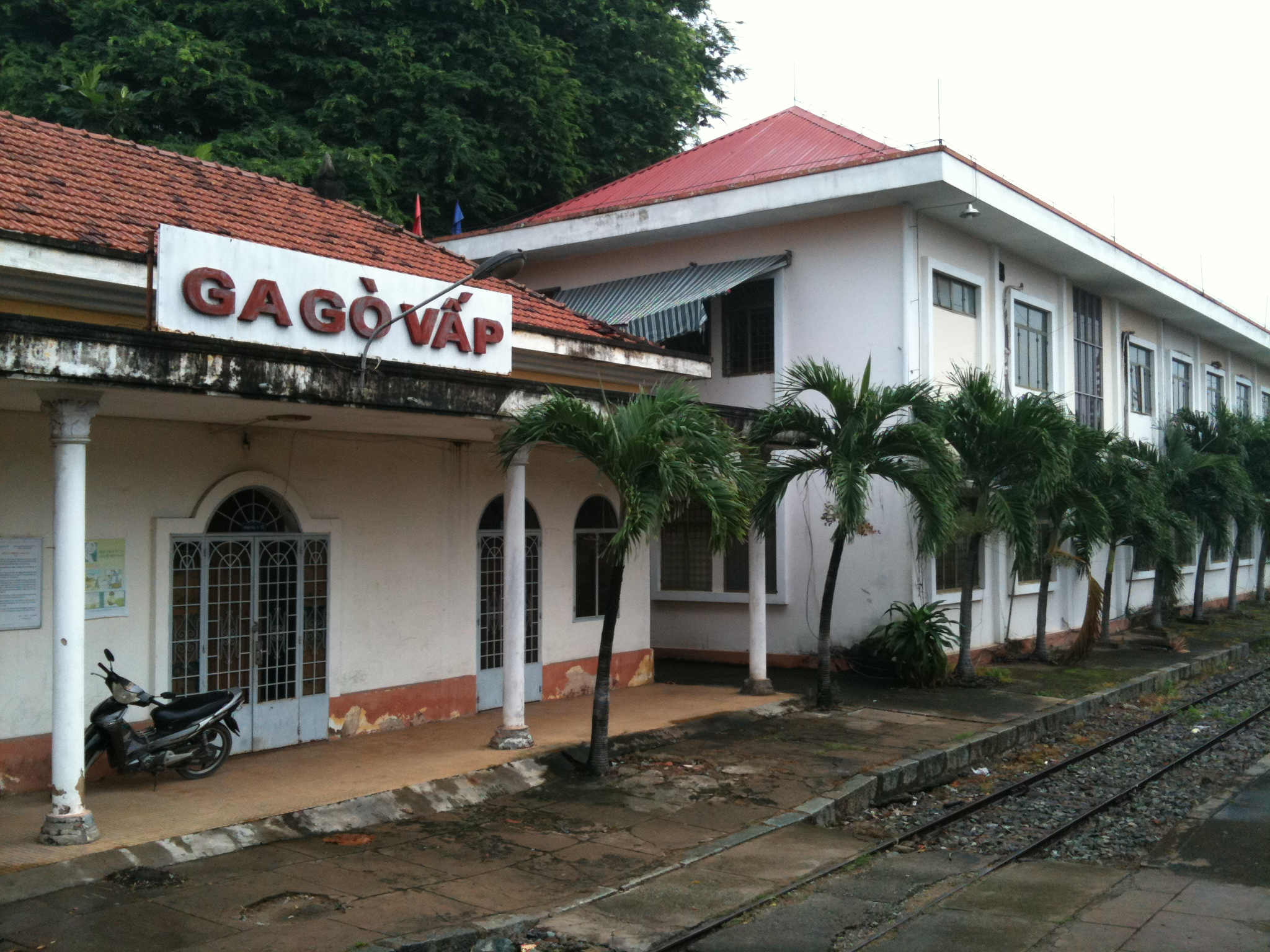

General information
- Location: 01 Lê Lai street, Ward 3, Gò Vấp, Ho Chi Minh City
- Coordinates: 10°48′57″N 106°41′5″E
- Line(s): North–South railway

Services
Preceding station	Vietnam Railways	Following station
Bình Triệu towards Hanoi	North–South	Saigon Terminus
Location

Gò Vấp station (Tiếng Việt: Ga Gò Vấp) is a railway station in Gò Vấp, Ho Chi Minh City, Vietnam. This is a station on North–South railway between Bình Triệu station and Saigon station.
