= Military history of Vietnam =

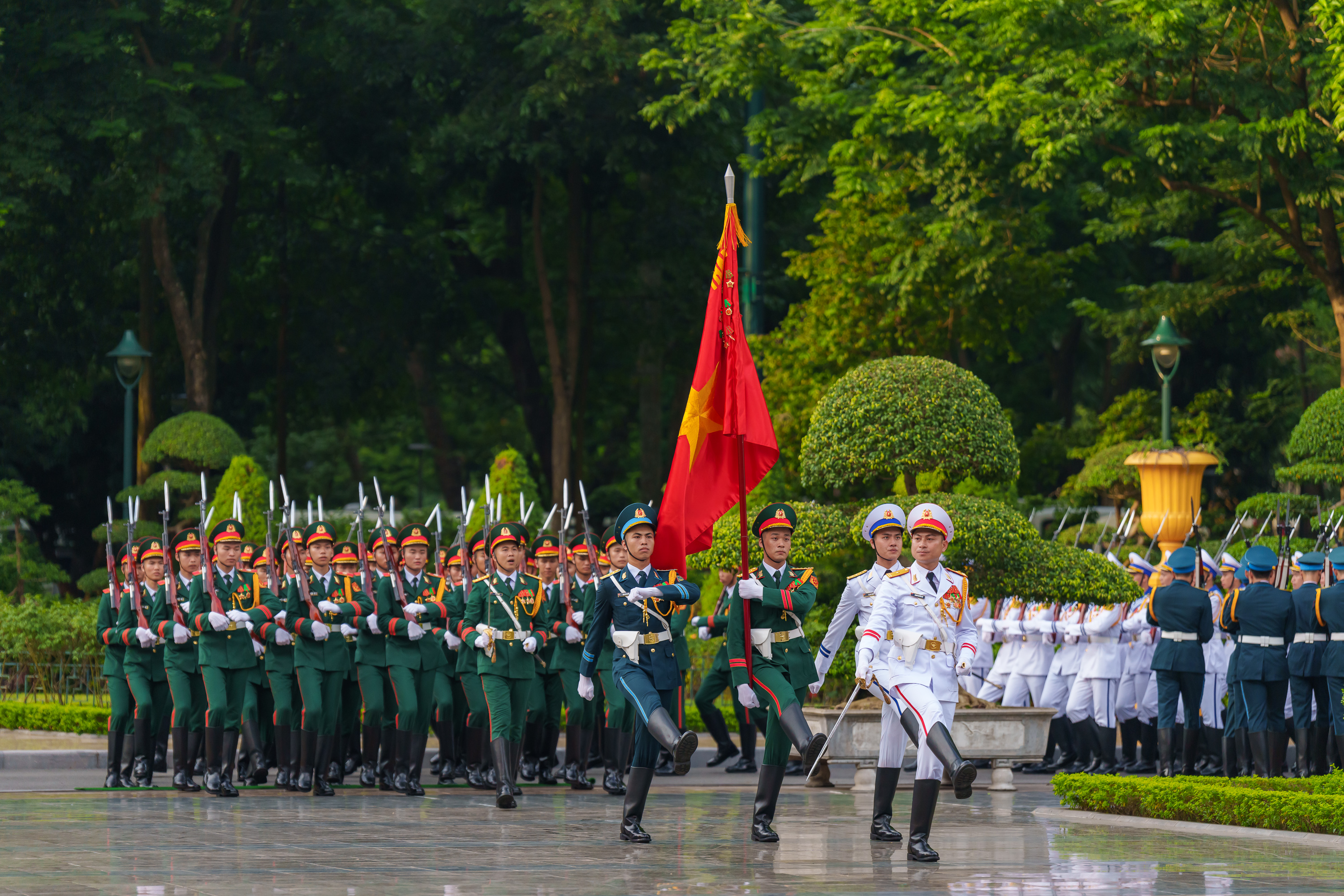
Honor guards representing the modern Vietnam People's Army greeted Joe Biden during his 2023 state visit to the country.

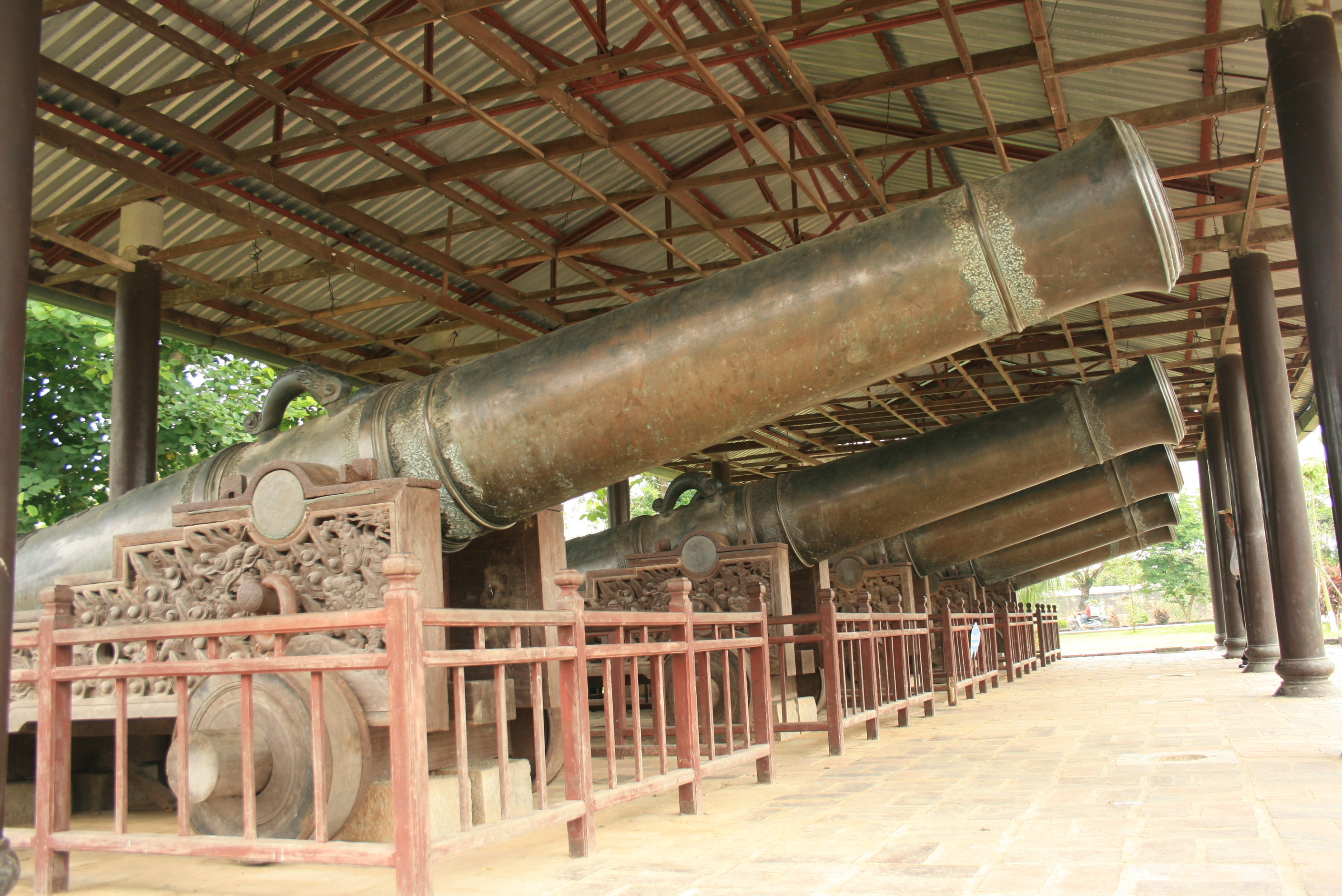
Cửu vị thần công of the Nguyễn dynasty

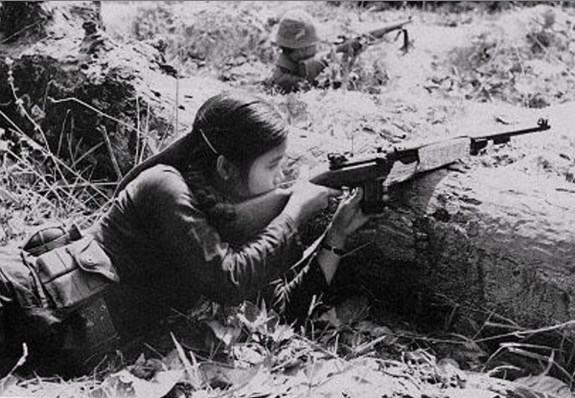
A female Viet Cong during the Vietnam War

Army and warfare made their first appearance in Vietnamese history during the 3rd millennium BC. Throughout thousands of years, wars played a great role in shaping the identity and culture of people that inhabited the land which is modern day Vietnam.

== Hồng Bàng period ==
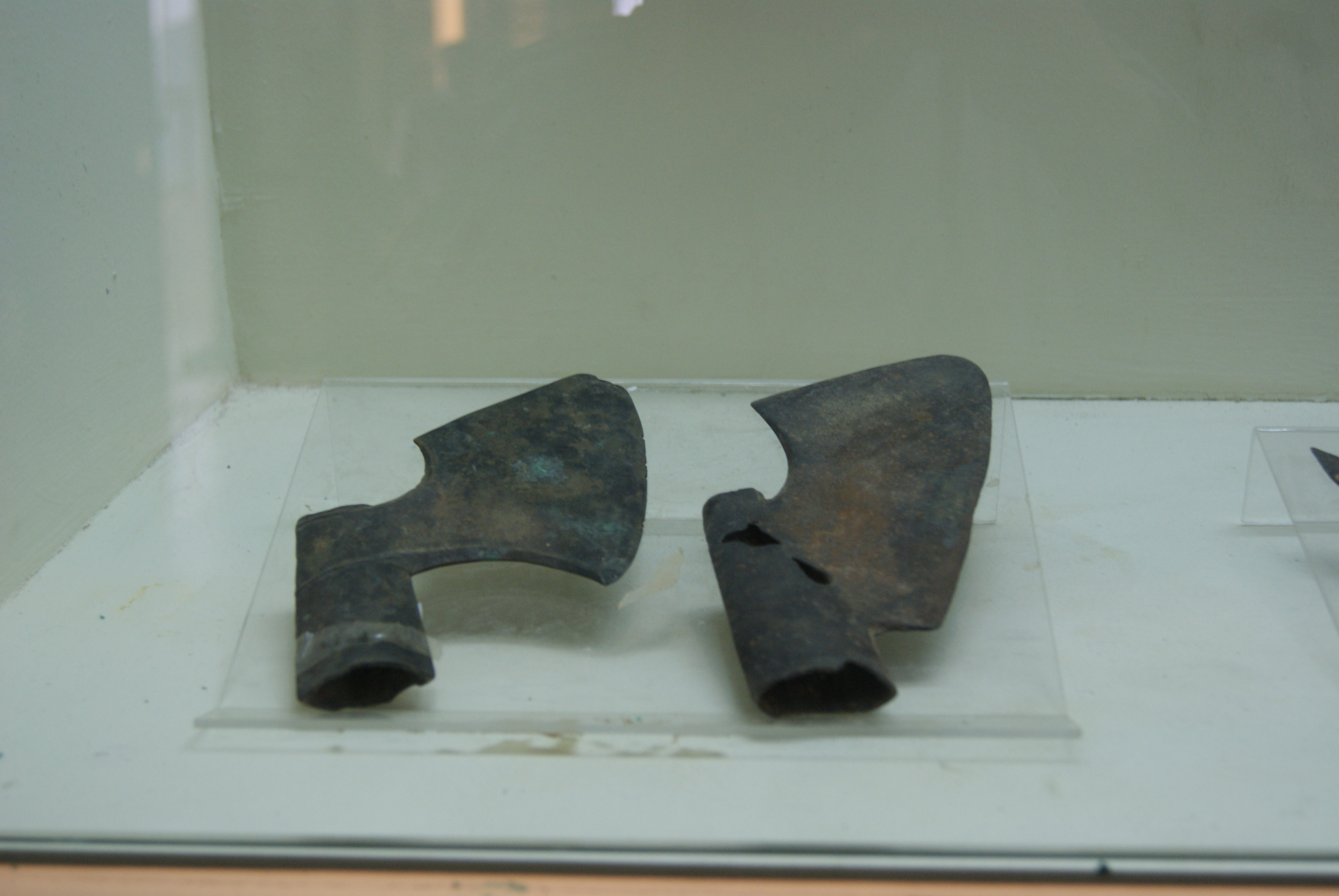
Đông Sơn battle axes

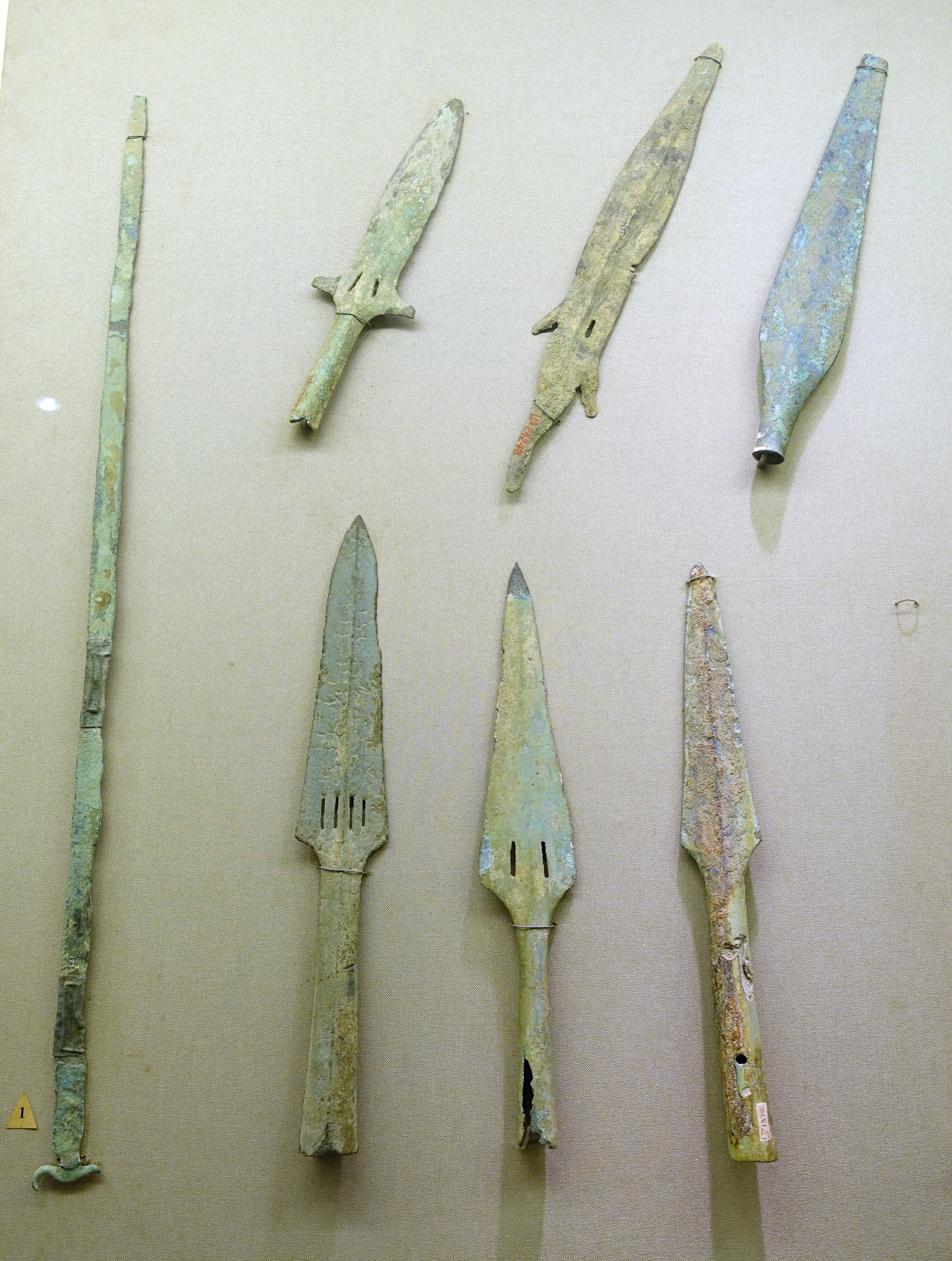
Spears and short swords, Đông Sơn culture, bronze and iron - National Museum of Vietnamese History - Hanoi, Vietnam

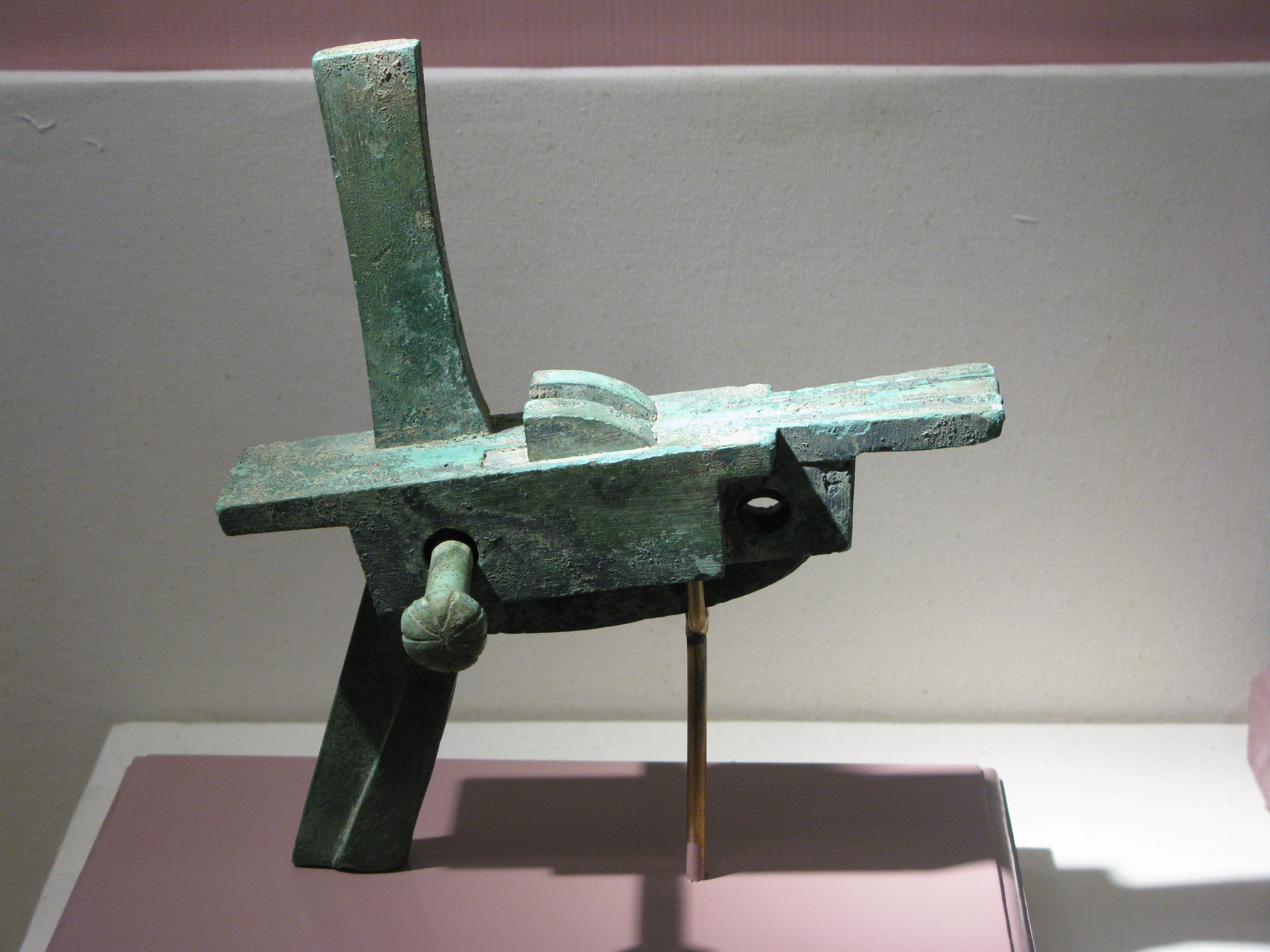
Đông Sơn crossbow trigger

Weapons are the most common Bronze Age artifacts found so far. The presence of arms in many tombs of upper-class people indicates the existence of a warrior class in Đông Sơn society during the Hồng Bàng dynasty.

== Medieval period ==
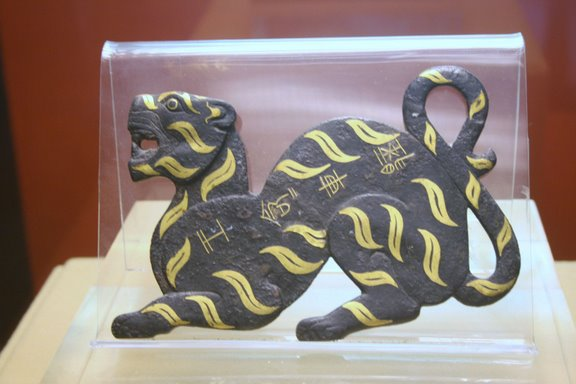
A tiger tally or hổ phù (虎符), made of bronze with gold inlay, found in the tomb of Triệu Văn Đế (Emperor Zhao Mo) at Guangzhou, from the Triệu dynasty, dated 2nd century BC. Tiger Tallies were separated into two pieces, one held by the emperor, the other given to a military commander as a symbol of imperial authority and the ability to command troops.

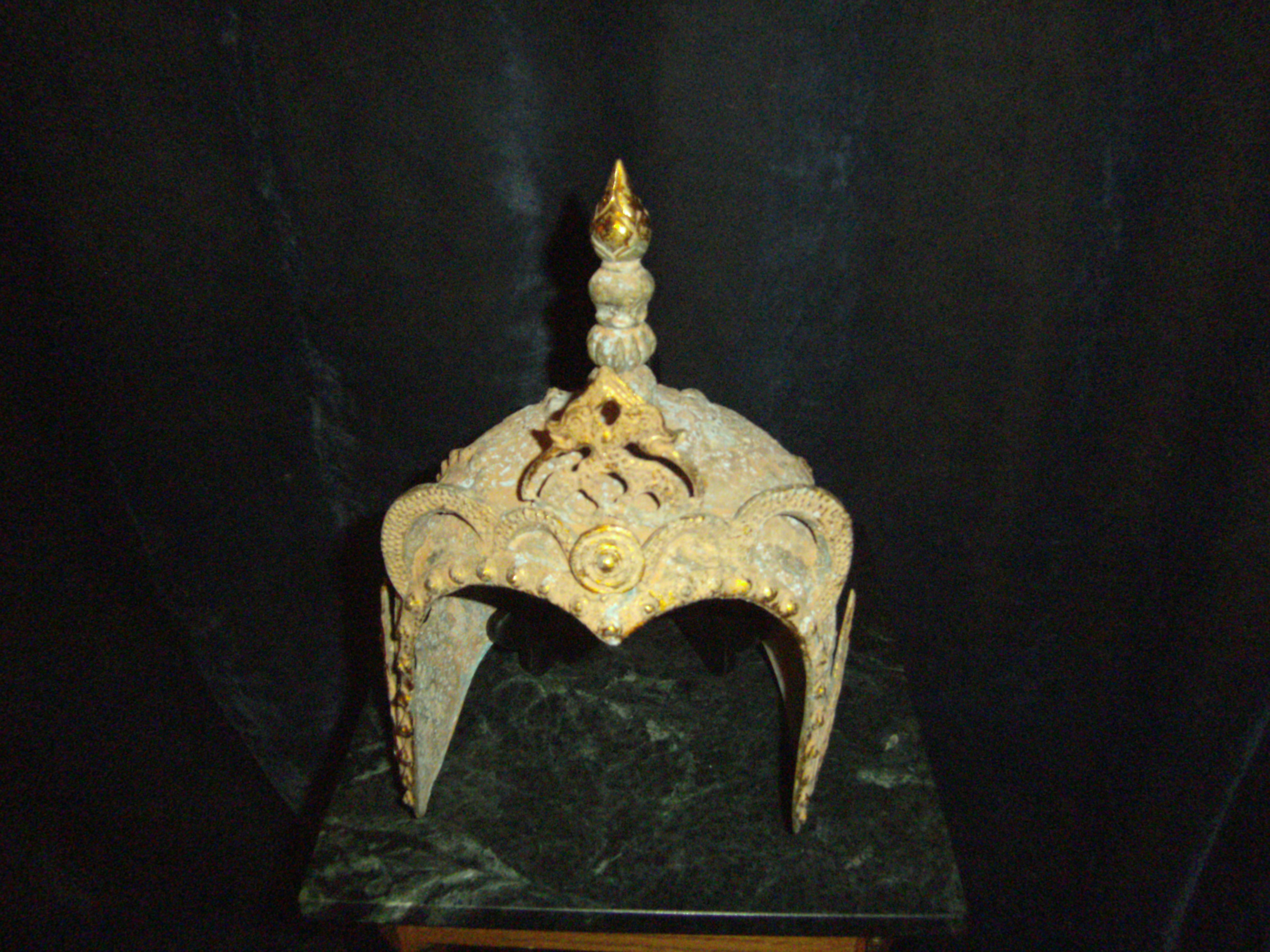
Bronze ceremonial helmet from the Trần dynasty of Annam circa 12-13th century.

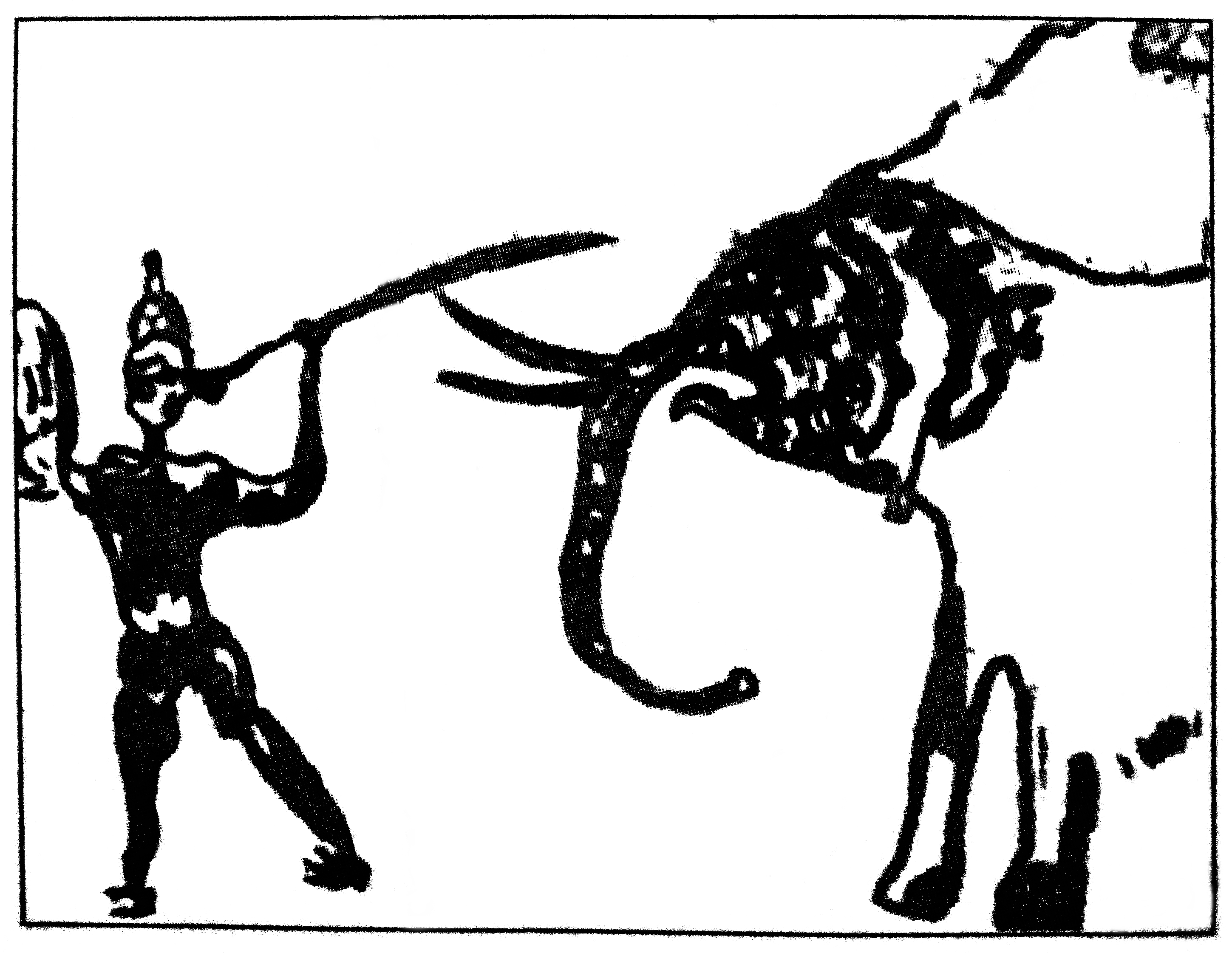
Pattern of warriors fighting on a fragment of jar. Brown glazed ceramic, Trần dynasty, 13th - 14th century.

Warfare during this 500-year period (938–1407) was characterized by a combination of amphibious and land assaults. Owing to the fragmented terrain and long coast line of the country, maneuvers by boats were favoured by most military forces who had fought in Vietnam. Small-scale coastal and border raids were frequent. Domestic violence as well as foreign incursions were equally common. It is possible that during this period that Vietnam was at its height of power, first by defeating the Southern Han in 938 AD. Then they emerged and decisively defeated the neighboring Dali, Khmer Empire, Champa, and the Song.

=== Mongol invasions of Vietnam ===
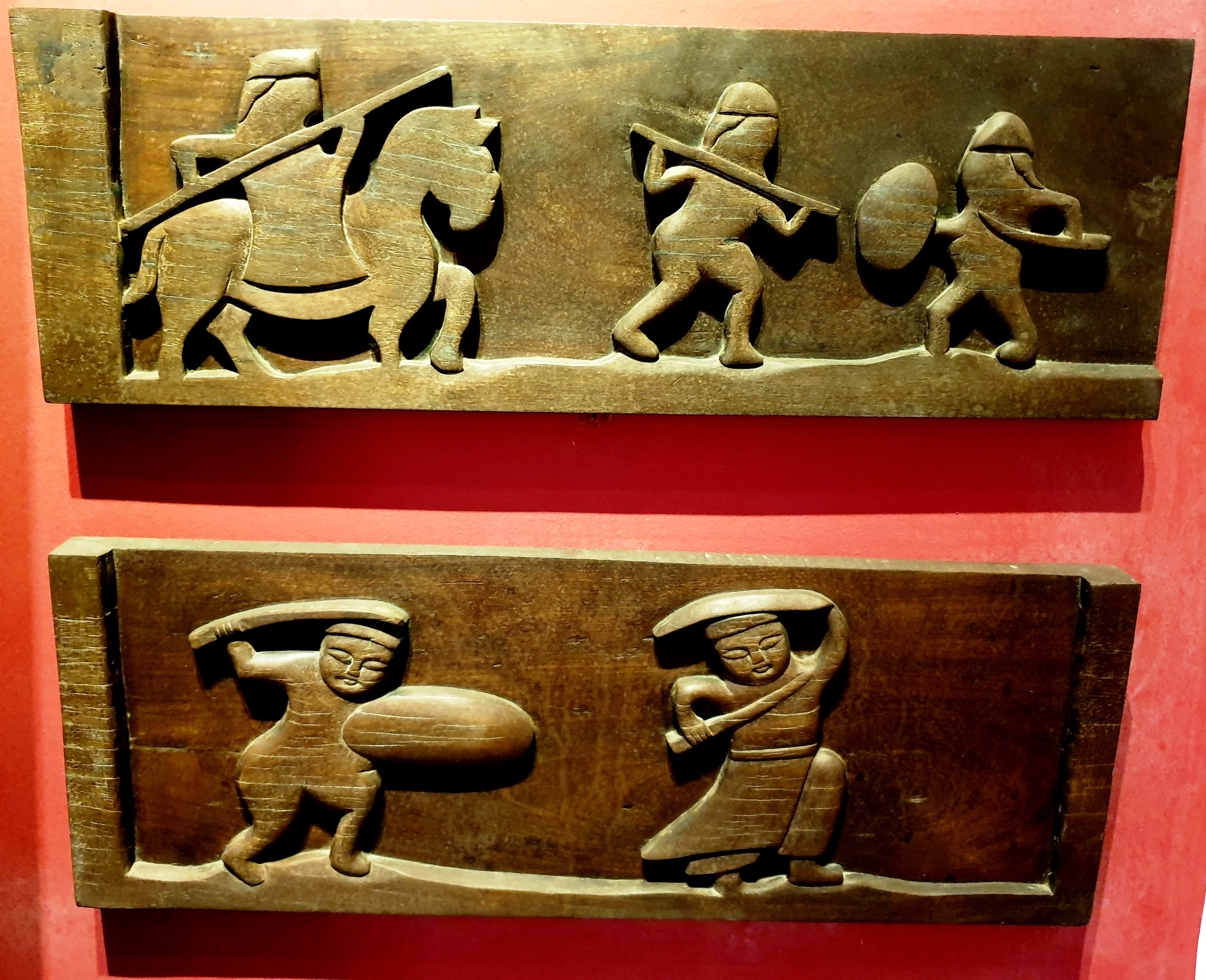
Relief on wooden panel from the Trần dynasty depicting soldiers training

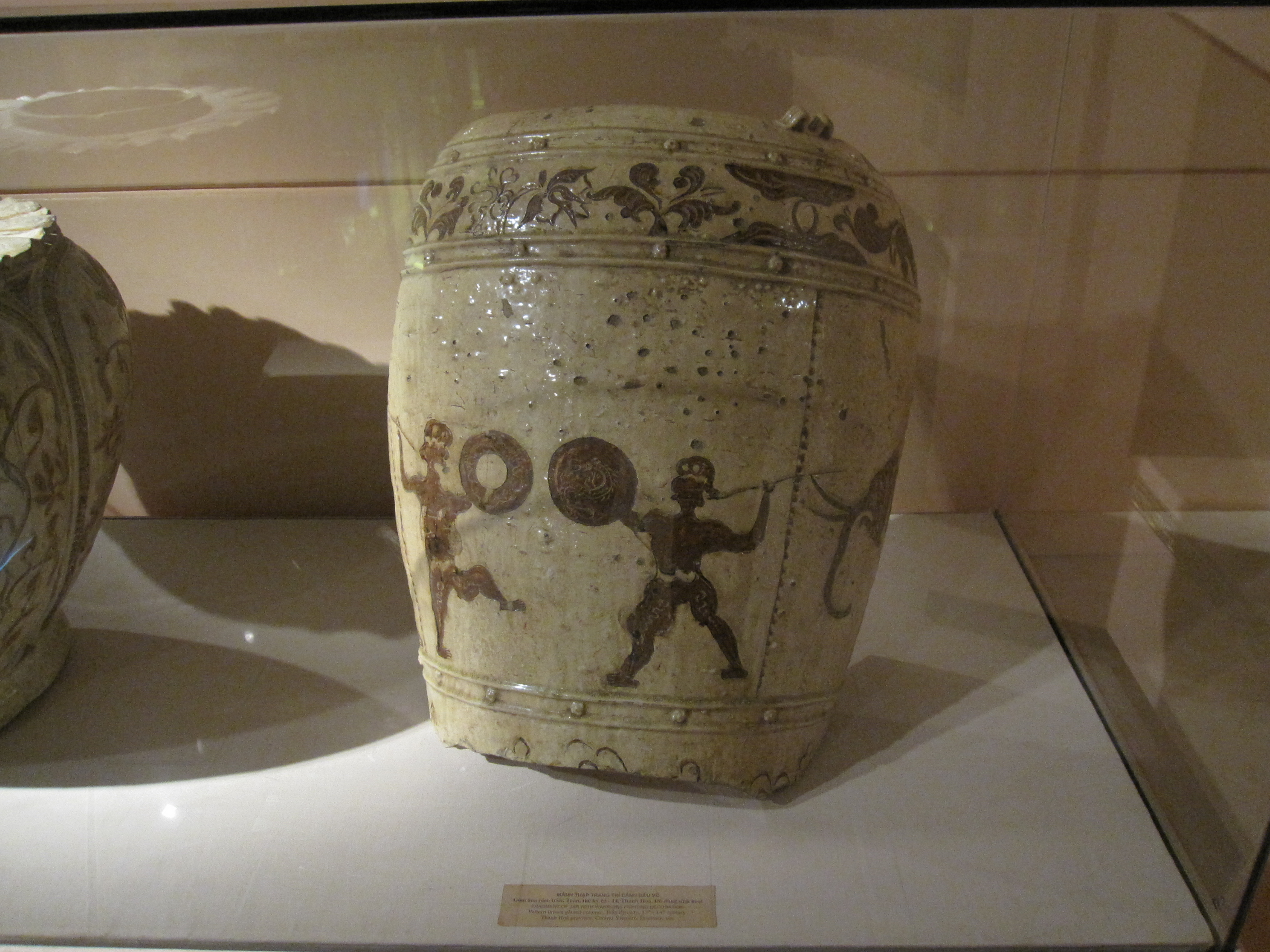
Scenes of soldiers practicing Trần dynasty depicted on celadon jar

In the 13th century, the Vietnamese defeated the Great Yuan dynasty of the Mongol empire three times, and it was seen as one of the most famous historical victories of Vietnam. In an extent, the Vietnamese successful repelling of Mongol invasions, had been recognized as the main factor which would have saved all Southeast Asia from Mongols.

== Early modern period ==
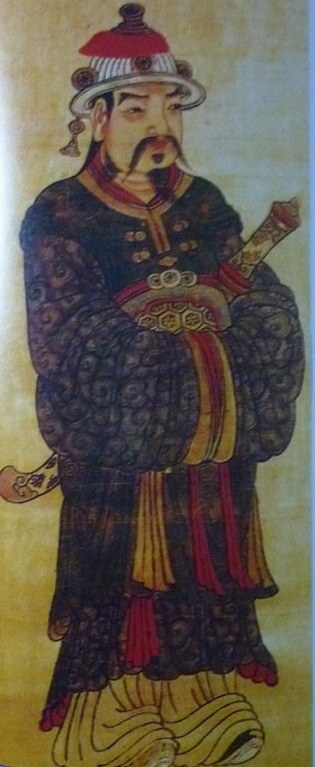
Military Mandarin of the Later Lê dynasty

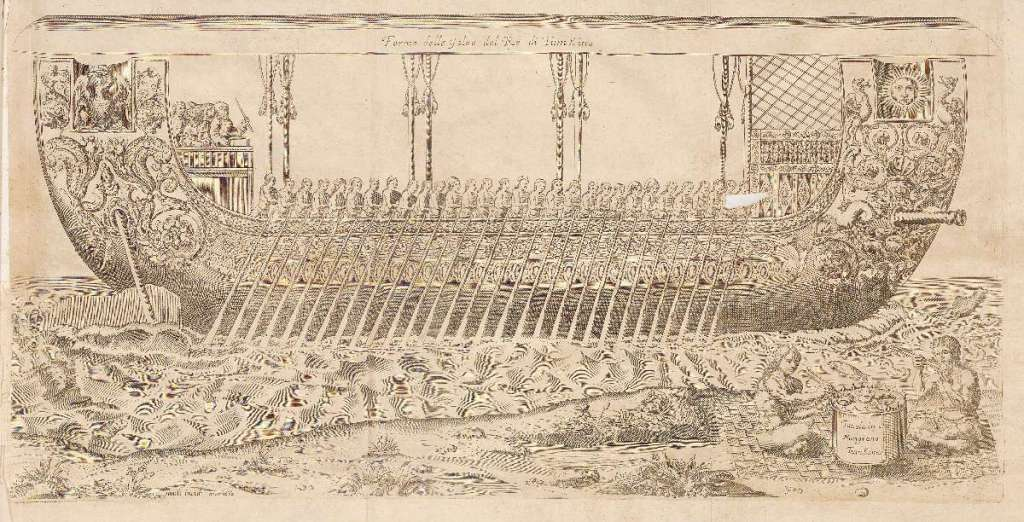
Mông Đồng 艨艟 is a class of near-shore warship and riverine boat that played a dominant role in medieval Vietnamese naval forces for over a thousand years.

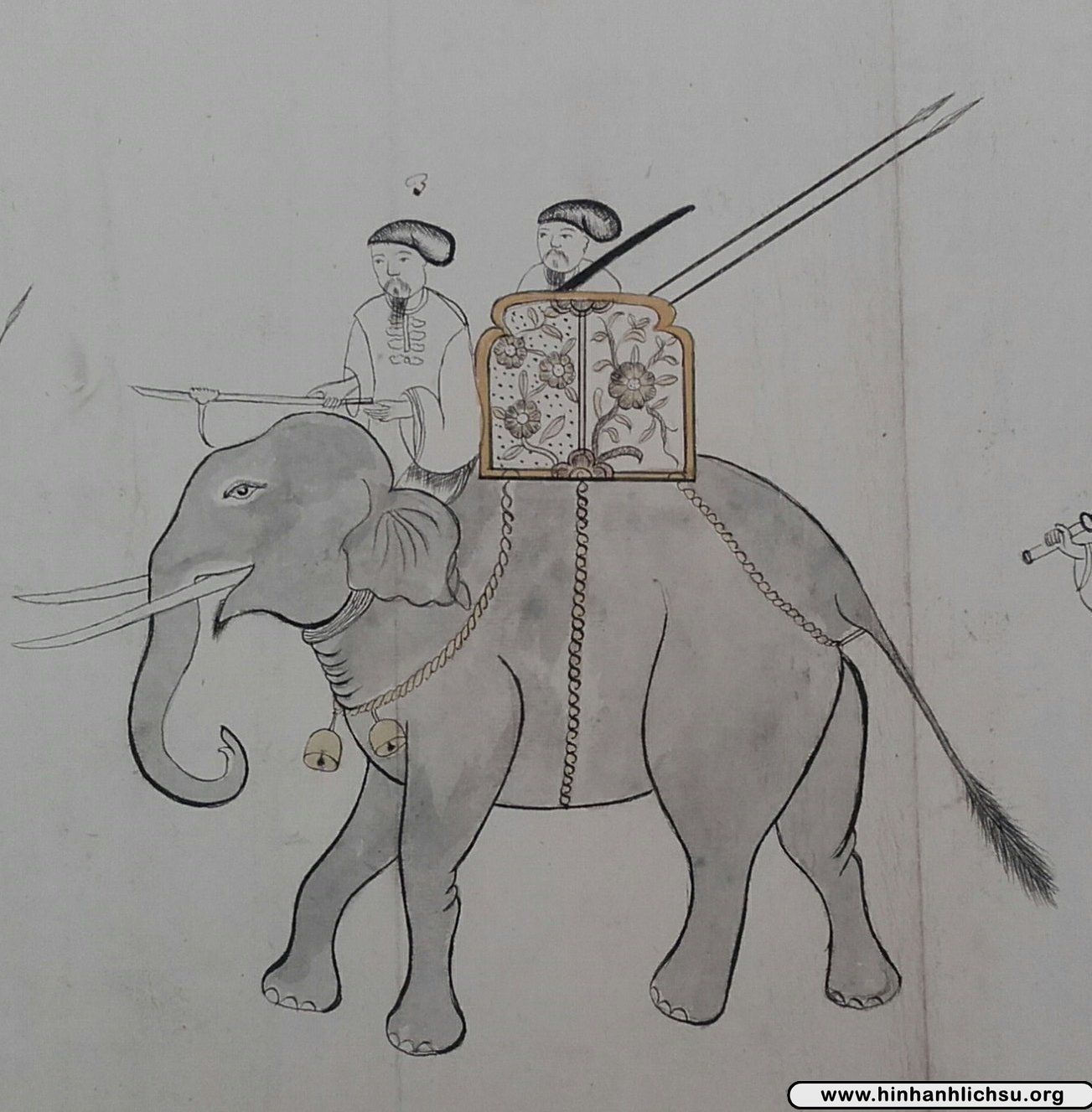
Revival Lê dynasty war elephant

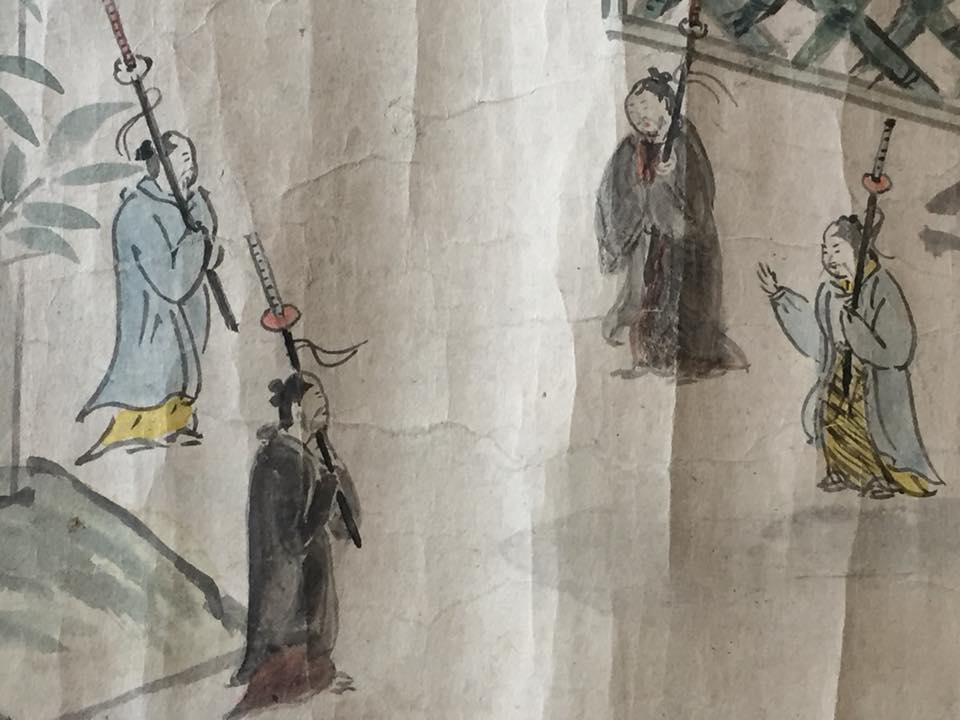
The swordsmen of Nguyễn lord under Revival Lê dynasty

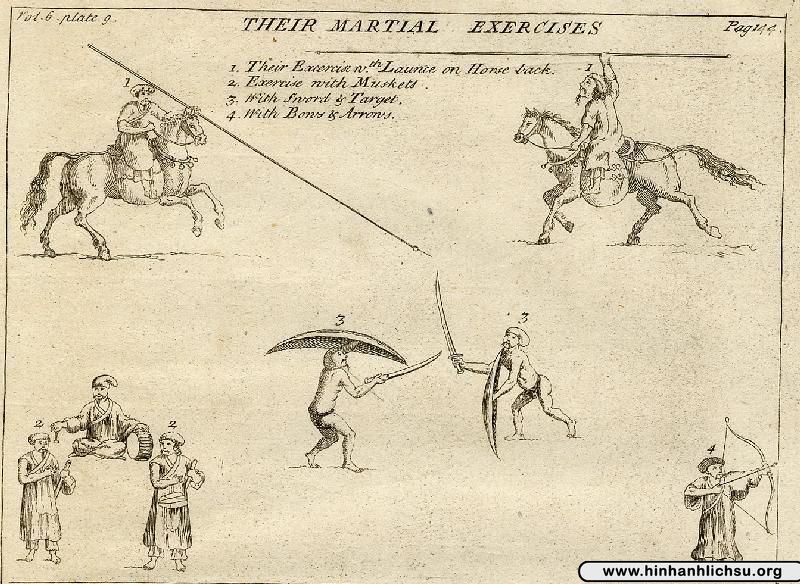
Painting of Trịnh lord's soldiers in training during the Revival Lê dynasty

Vietnam adopted firearms from the Ming dynasty in the late 14th century. The conquest of Champa was attributed to Later Lê dynasty firearm advantage.

Around 15th-16th century, firearms started to gain dominance on Vietnam's battlefields. Rivaling feudal lords were quick to adopt these new deadly weapons. Tactics were changed to accommodate guns and cannons and soon the country had as many guns as it could afford. Throughout the time, the Vietnamese state also annexed the Southern region of the declining Khmer Empire which would become Vietnam today.

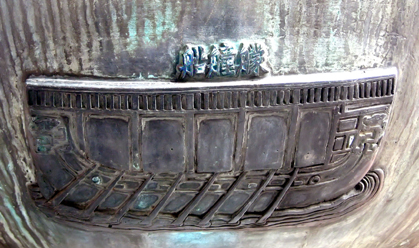
Mông Đồng carved at Keo Temple

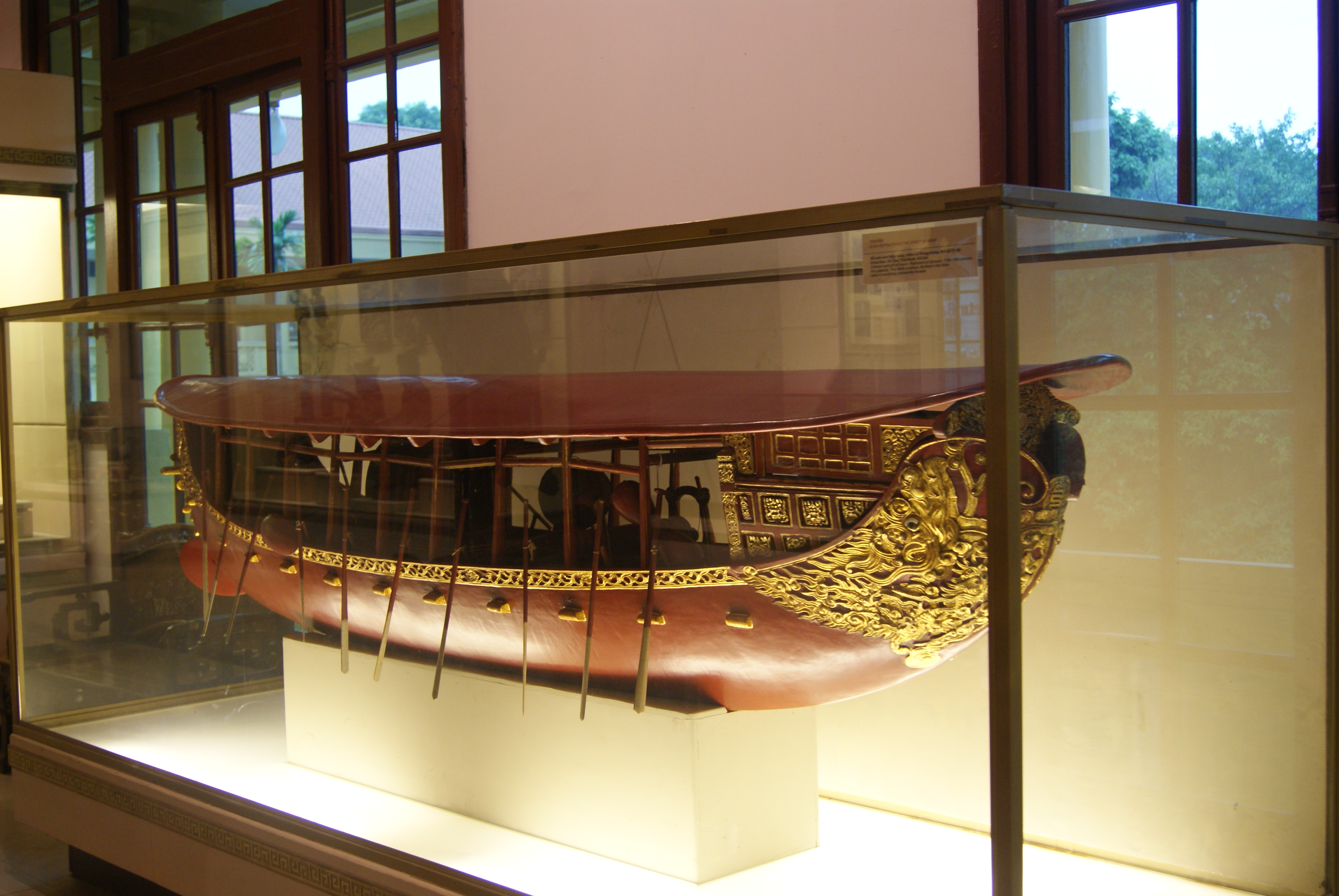
Model of Mông Đồng in the Revival Lê period

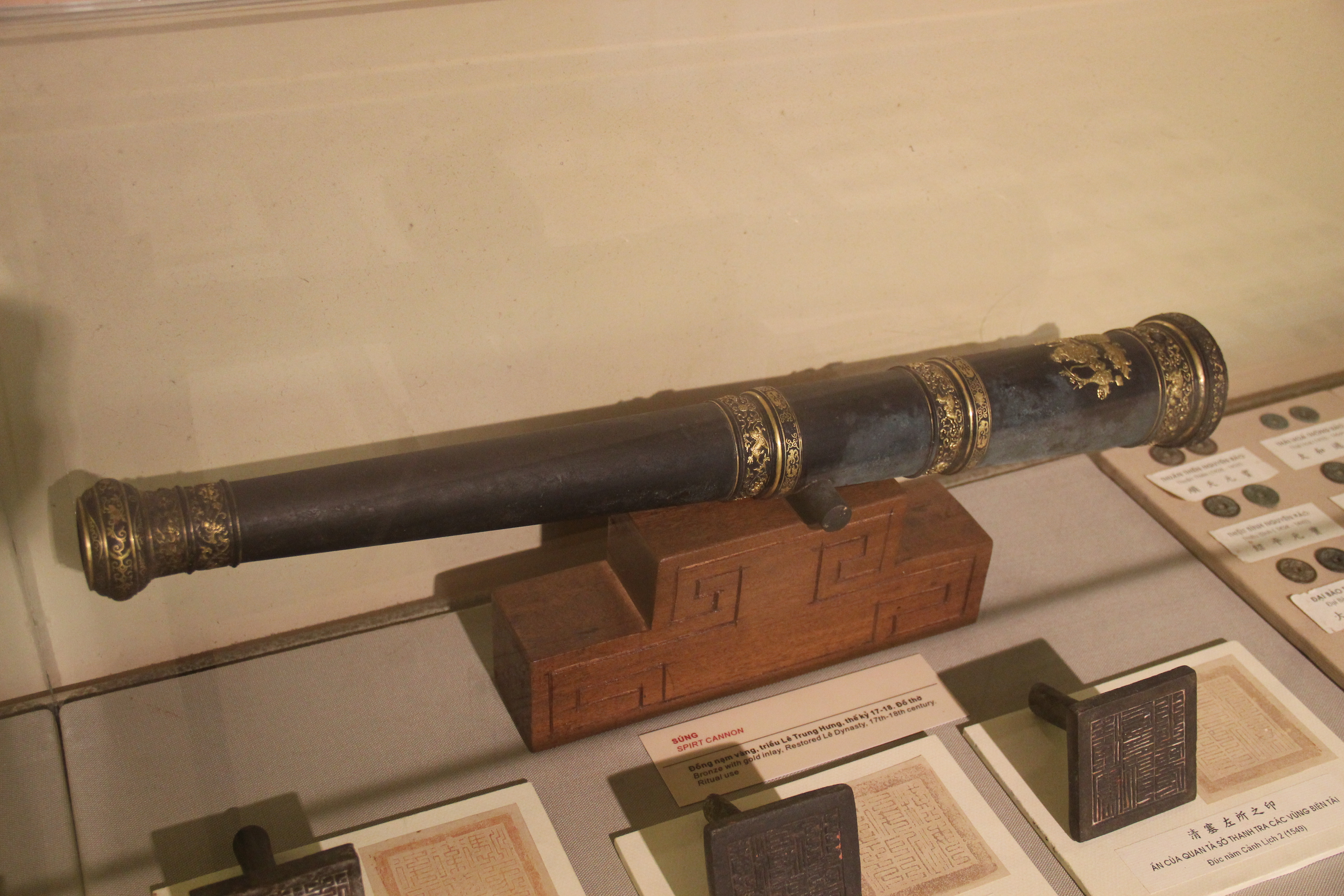
Revival Lê dynasty signal cannon, 17th-18th century

== Tây Sơn period ==
Future Emperor Quang Trung, along with Nguyễn Nhạc and Nguyễn Lữ, had successfully united all Vietnam after a century being divided between the Trịnh Lords and Nguyễn Lords. Following with it, the Vietnamese also successfully crushed the Siamese at the Battle of Rạch Gầm-Xoài Mút and decisively, the Battle of Ngọc Hồi-Đống Đa against Qing force. Thus, this had been also registered as Vietnamese military victories.

== Nguyễn period ==
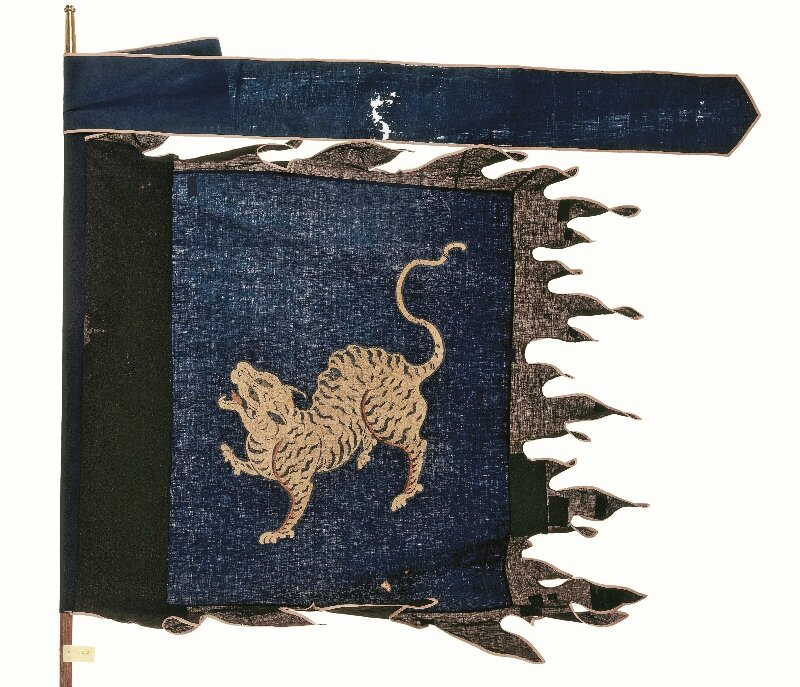
Flag of the Army of the Nguyễn dynasty

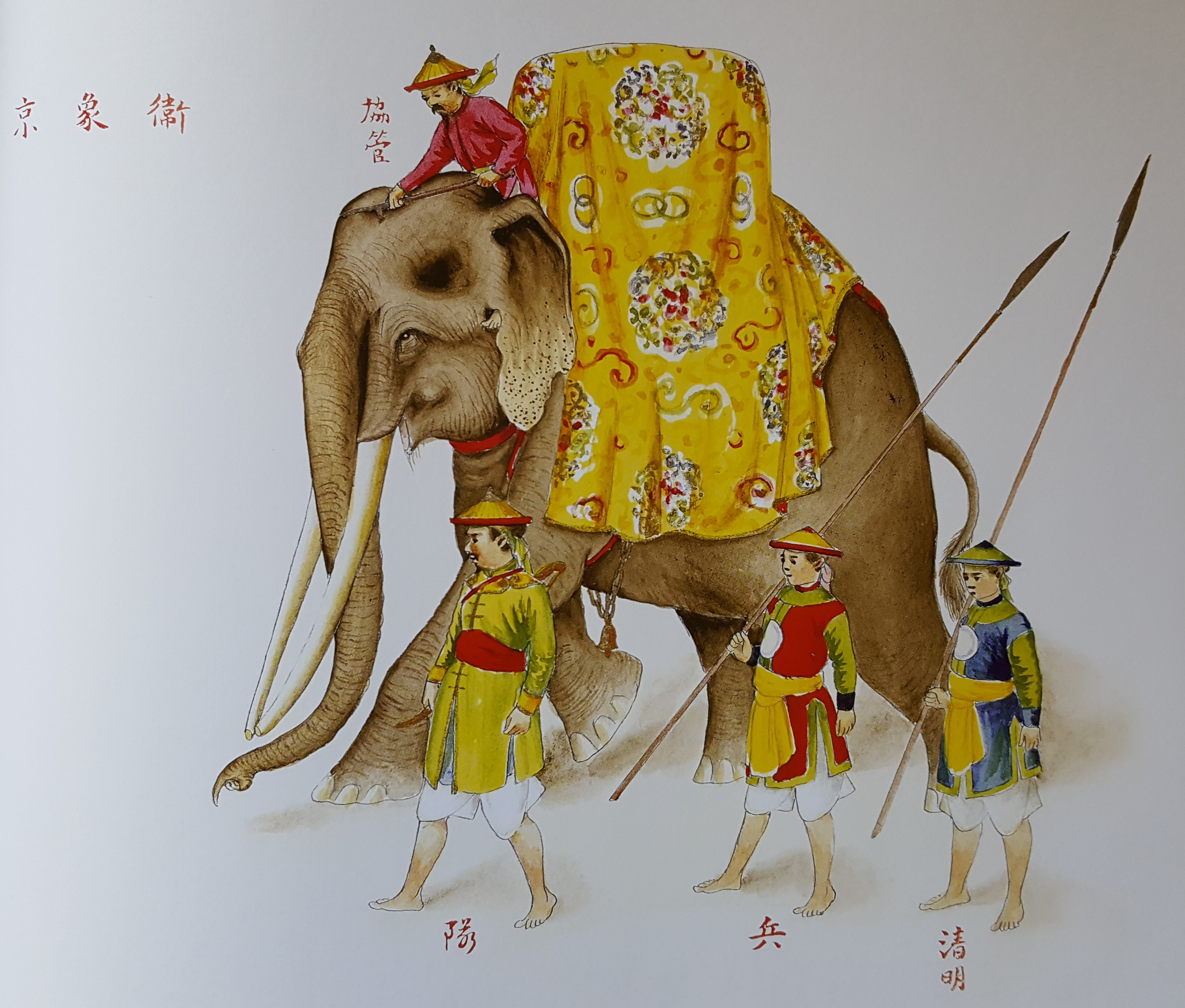
Nguyễn dynasty war elephant

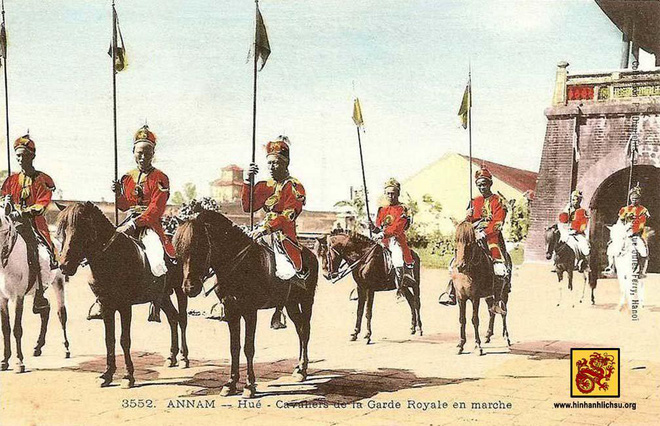
Nguyễn dynasty cavalier soldier

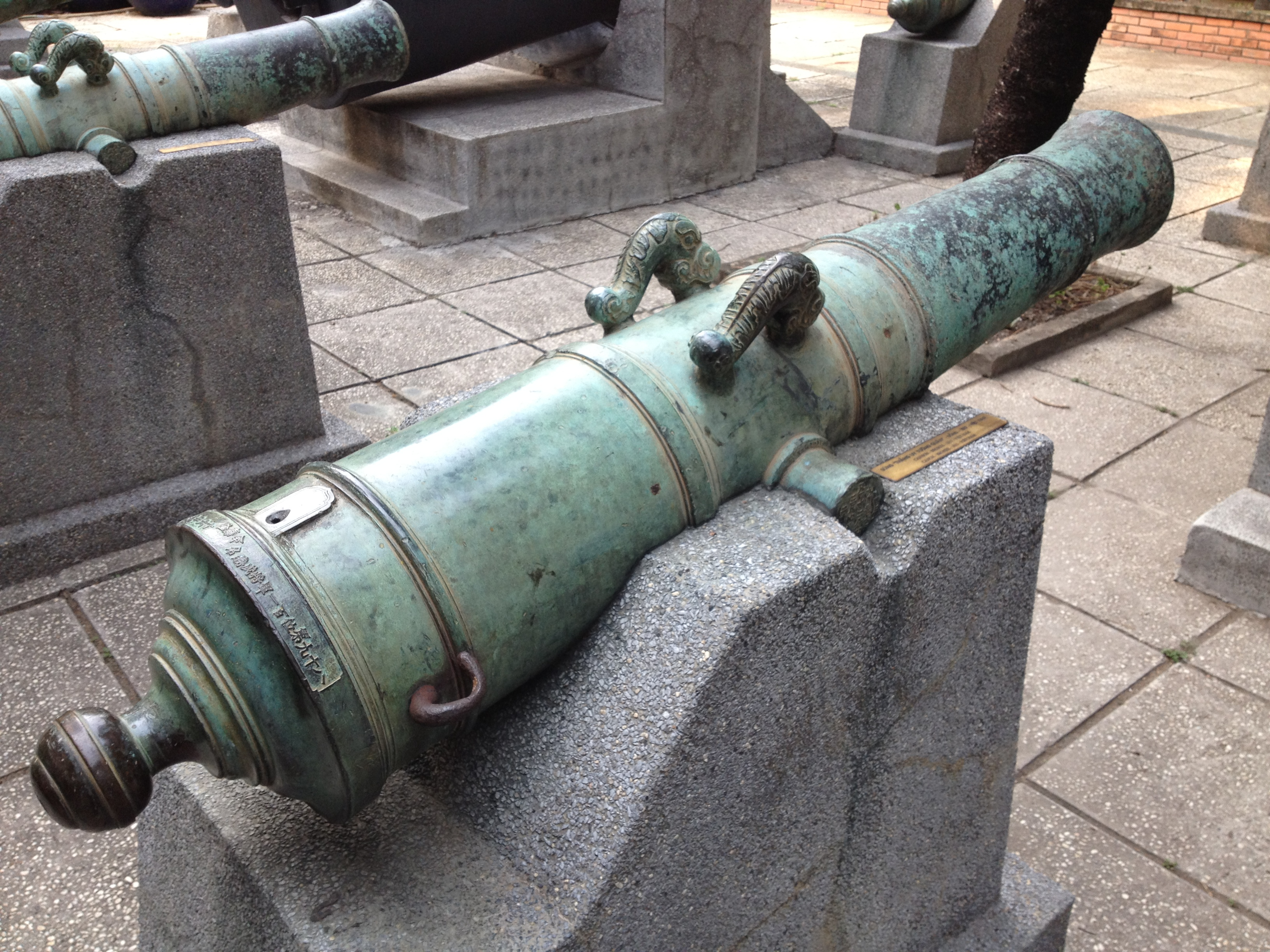
Nguyễn dynasty cannon

=== Japanese invasion of French Indochina ===
The Japanese invasion of French Indochina was a successful Japanese campaign against the French colonial power in Southeast Asia. The invasion was a part of a greater strategy which was meant to surround and isolate China. Following the fall of the French in Indochina, Việt Minh began its campaign against the Japanese occupiers, using guerrilla tactics. The conflict ended when Japan surrendered to the United States, following the bombing of Hiroshima and Nagasaki.

== Modern period ==
First Indochina War

Following the allied victory in World War II, France was hoping to regain control over its former colony in Indochina, which was also claimed by the Viet Minh. France attempted to invade and reoccupy Vietnam, but after nine years of war and the subsequent military defeat in The Battle of Dien Bien Phu, the French gave up and retreated from Indochina. This resulted in Indochina being divided into four countries under the terms of the 1954 Geneva Accords: North Vietnam, South Vietnam, Laos and Kampuchea.

Laotian Civil War

The Laotian Civil War began in 1953 when war escalated between the government forces and Pathet Lao, which received support from North Vietnam and China. In addition to their desire to support the communist movement in Laos, Vietnam also wanted to control the strategically important areas in Laos. The conflict ended in 1975, when Pathet Lao seized power in Laos, ending the Kingdom of Laos.

North Vietnamese invasion of Laos

The North Vietnamese invasion of Laos begun in 1958 as a mixed result of boundary disputes and the Hanoi Regime's desire to control the Ho Chi Minh-path. The invasion was a success, and North Vietnam secured control over important parts of Laos.

Vietnam War

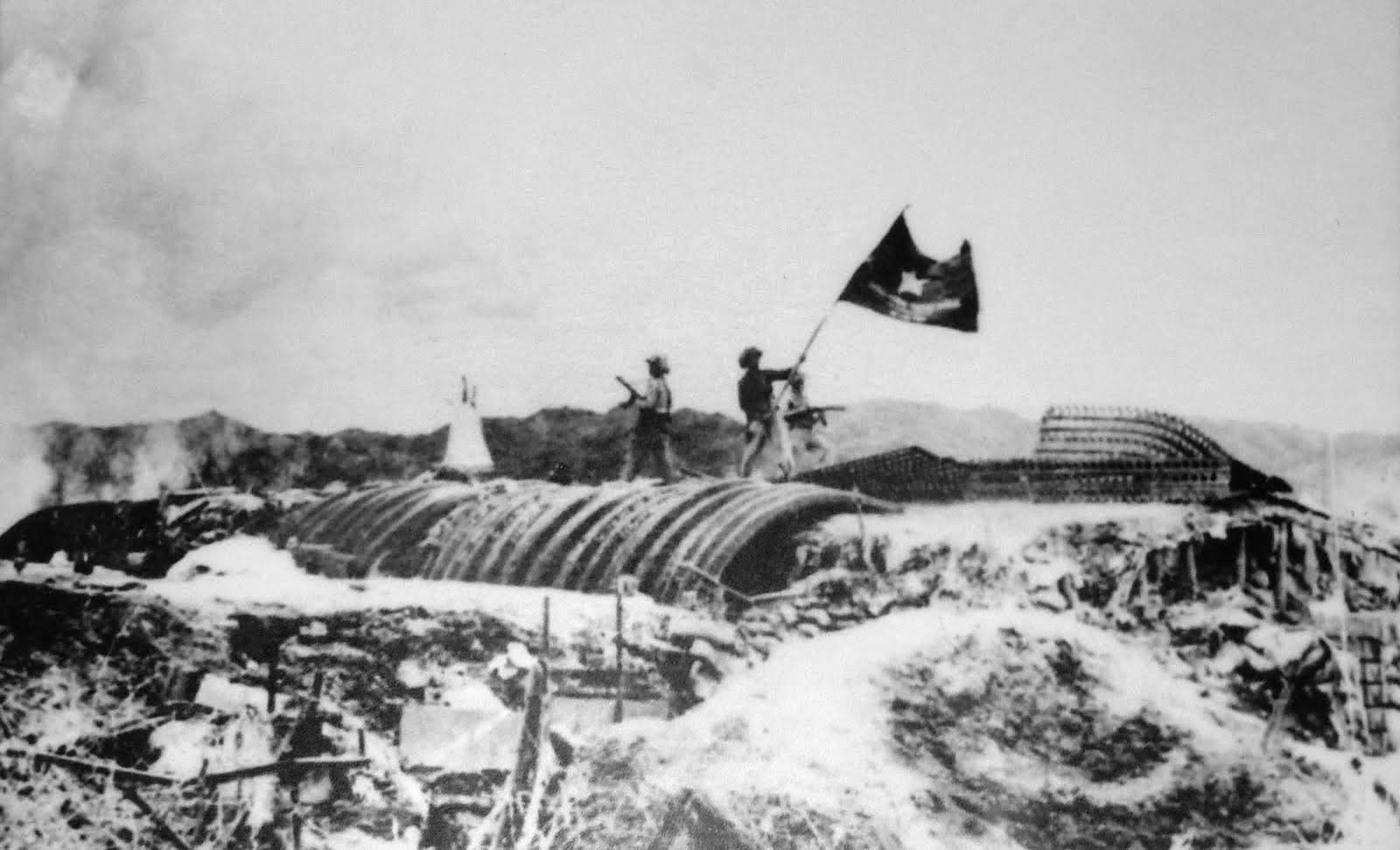
Victory in Battle of Dien Bien Phu

The Vietnam War started with the breach of the intended general election to unite the country by South Vietnam and the Việt Cộng initiation of a guerrilla war in the south. This led to an American intervention which lasted until 1973, when they withdrew their forces from Vietnam following a peace treaty. The war went on, and in 1975 North Vietnam emerged victorious.

Cambodian Civil War

The Cambodian Civil War was a mixed result of the Khmer Rouge's desire to establish a communist regime in Cambodia, eventually dragging Cambodia into the Vietnam War due to the North Vietnamese support for the Khmer Rouge and their use of Cambodian soil to stage attacks into South Vietnam. The US heavily bombed PVA, VC and Khmer Rouge position in Cambodia. Khmer Rouge was aided militarily by the North Vietnamese Army and the Viet Cong, and won the war in 1975.

Hmong Insurgency

When the Laotian Civil War ended in 1975, the government of Laos started to persecute the Hmong-tribes, who had been fighting alongside the United States in the Vietnam War. Vietnam has participated in the persecution, which has led to thousands of Hmong fleeing to the United States and Thailand. Although the Hmong no longer poses a military threat to the government of Laos, they are still under suspect by Laotian authorities.

Cambodian-Vietnamese War

When the Vietnam War ended, the Khmer Rouge, which then controlled Cambodia, claimed the Mekong Delta being a historical part of Cambodia. When Vietnam refused to cede the delta to Cambodia, the Khmer Rouge responded by conducting several border skirmishes, infiltrations and sabotage. By the late 1978, Vietnam invaded Cambodia, and after two weeks of fighting, Vietnamese forces captured Phnom Penh. Vietnam occupied Cambodia until 1988.

Vietnamese border raids in Thailand

The Vietnamese border raids in Thailand were a Vietnamese attempt to stop the Khmer Rouge from using Thailand as a base when fighting against Vietnam and the Vietnamese-friendly regime in Pnomh Penh. Vietnamese troops chased the Khmer Rouge guerrillas and frequently made minor incursions into Thai territory. This resulted in clashes between Vietnamese and Thai forces. However, this never led to a war.

Sino-Vietnamese War

In response to Vietnam's 1978 invasion and occupation of Cambodia (which ended the rule of the Chinese-backed Khmer Rouge), the People's Republic of China launched a brief punitive military campaign against Vietnam, lasting from 17 February to 16 March. Chinese forces entered northern Vietnam and captured several cities near the border. On 6 March 1979, China declared that the gate to Hanoi was open and that their punitive mission had been achieved, before withdrawing their troops from Vietnam. Both China and Vietnam claimed victory in the war; as Vietnamese troops remained in Cambodia until 1989, it can be said that China was unsuccessful in their goal of dissuading Vietnam from involvement in Cambodia.

Sino-Vietnamese border conflicts 1979–1990

After China withdrew from Vietnam in 1979, border conflicts continued to occur. These conflicts often involved cross-border raids and battles, and claimed thousands of lives from both sides. The conflict subsided in 1990, without an outbreak of war.

Thai–Laotian Border War

The Thai–Laotian Border War began in 1987, when Thailand invaded parts of Laos claimed by the former. The Thai secured 70% of ground around Hill 1428. Laos was supported by its communist ally Vietnam. The Thai were pushed back to the border. The war ended with a ceasefire in 1988 and a return to the status-quo. Laos regained all lost ground, but both sides kept occupying parts of the disputed area.

== Notable commanders ==
- Trưng Sisters
- Bà Triệu
- Bùi Thị Xuân
- Lý Bí
- Triệu Việt Vương
- Ngô Quyền
- Đinh Bộ Lĩnh
- Lê Hoàn
- Lý Thường Kiệt
- Trần Hưng Đạo: notable for the rebellion of Mongol invasions to Vietnam twice
- Trần Quang Khải
- Trần Khánh Dư
- Lê Lai: the General who disguised as Lord Lê Lợi against the Ming
- Lê Lợi
- Nguyễn Huệ, Nguyễn Nhạc and Nguyễn Lữ
- Trương Định
- Võ Nguyên Giáp

== Gallery ==
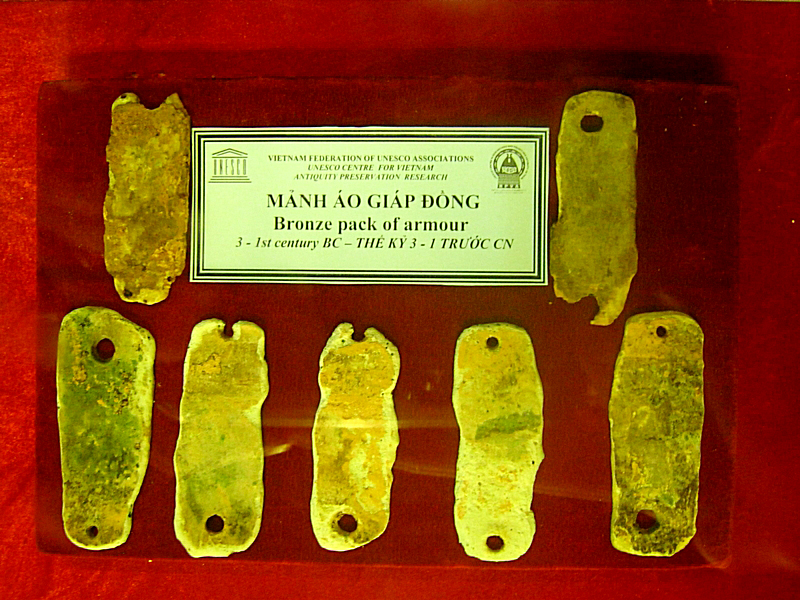
Late Đông Sơn metal lamellae (3rd - 1st century BC)

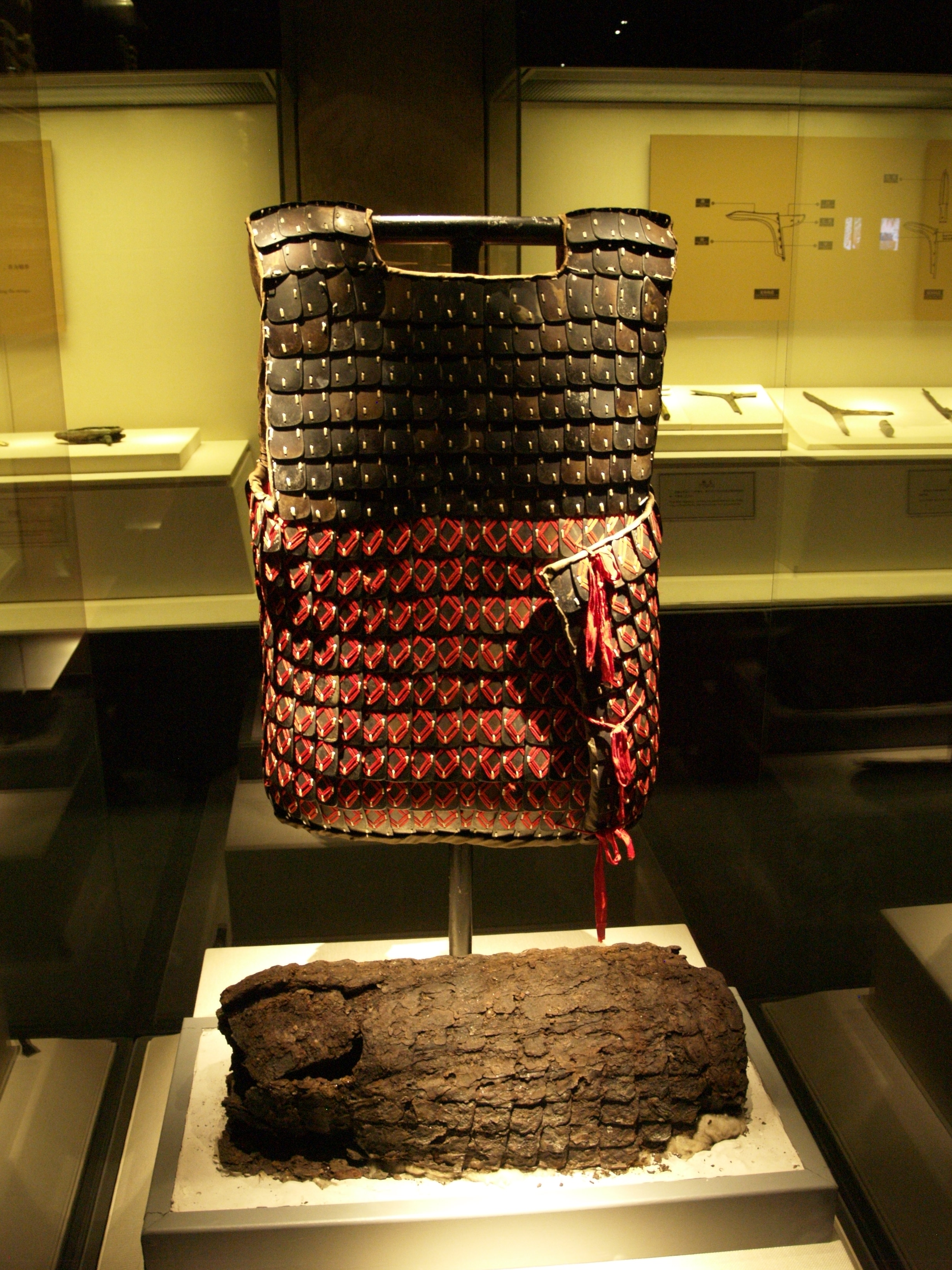
Armour of Nam Việt (with reconstructed replica) in the 2nd century BC

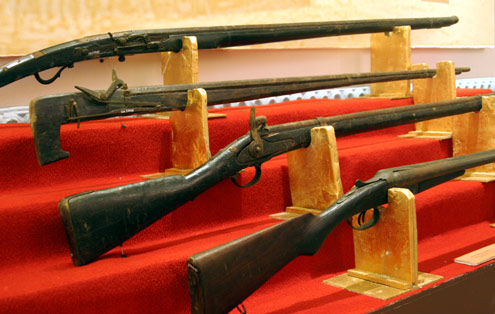
Matchlock arquebuses, flintlock musket, percussion cap rifle and double barreled shotgun of medieval and early modern ages

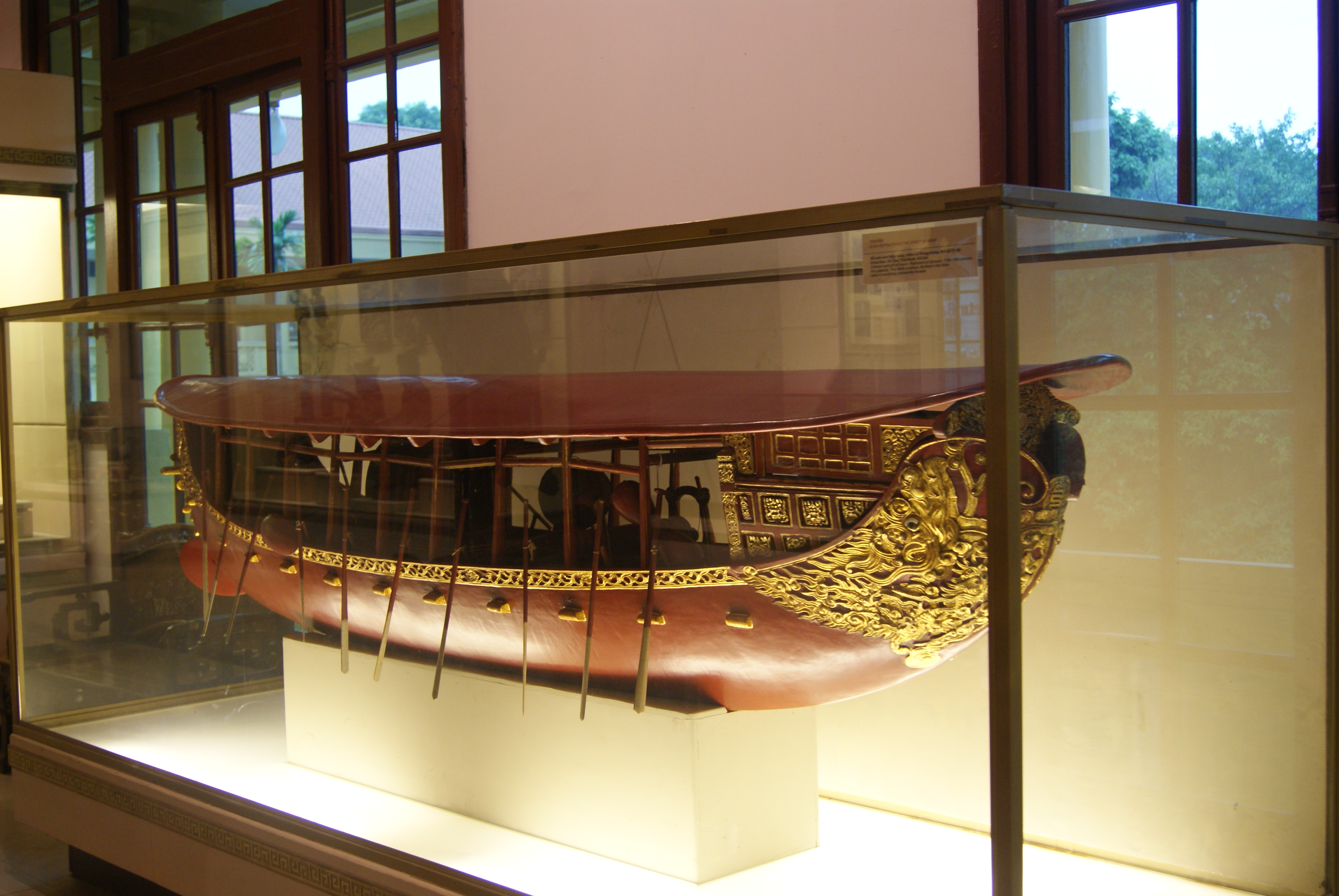
Model of a 17th-century gunboat called "Mông Đồng"

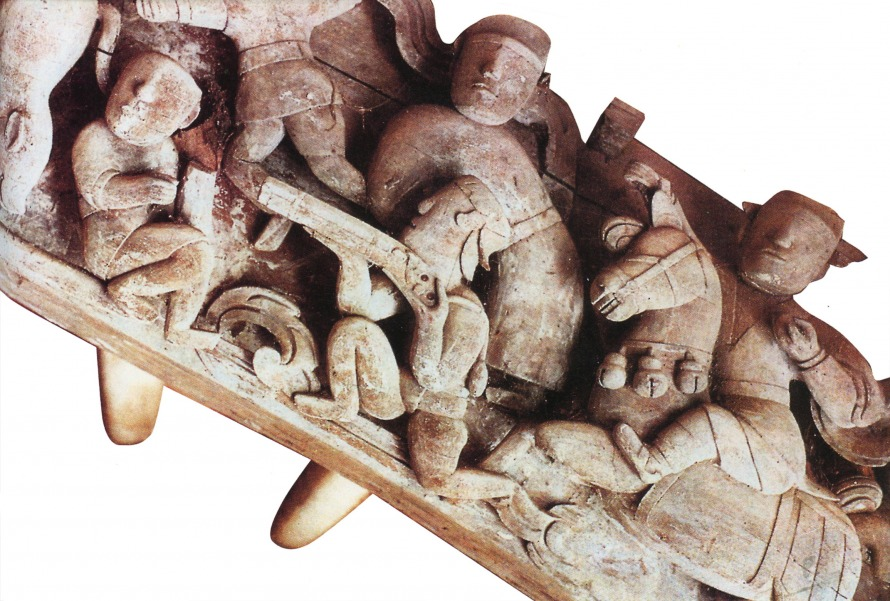
17th century wood relief showing arquebusier alongside mounted archer, Hương Canh Communal house

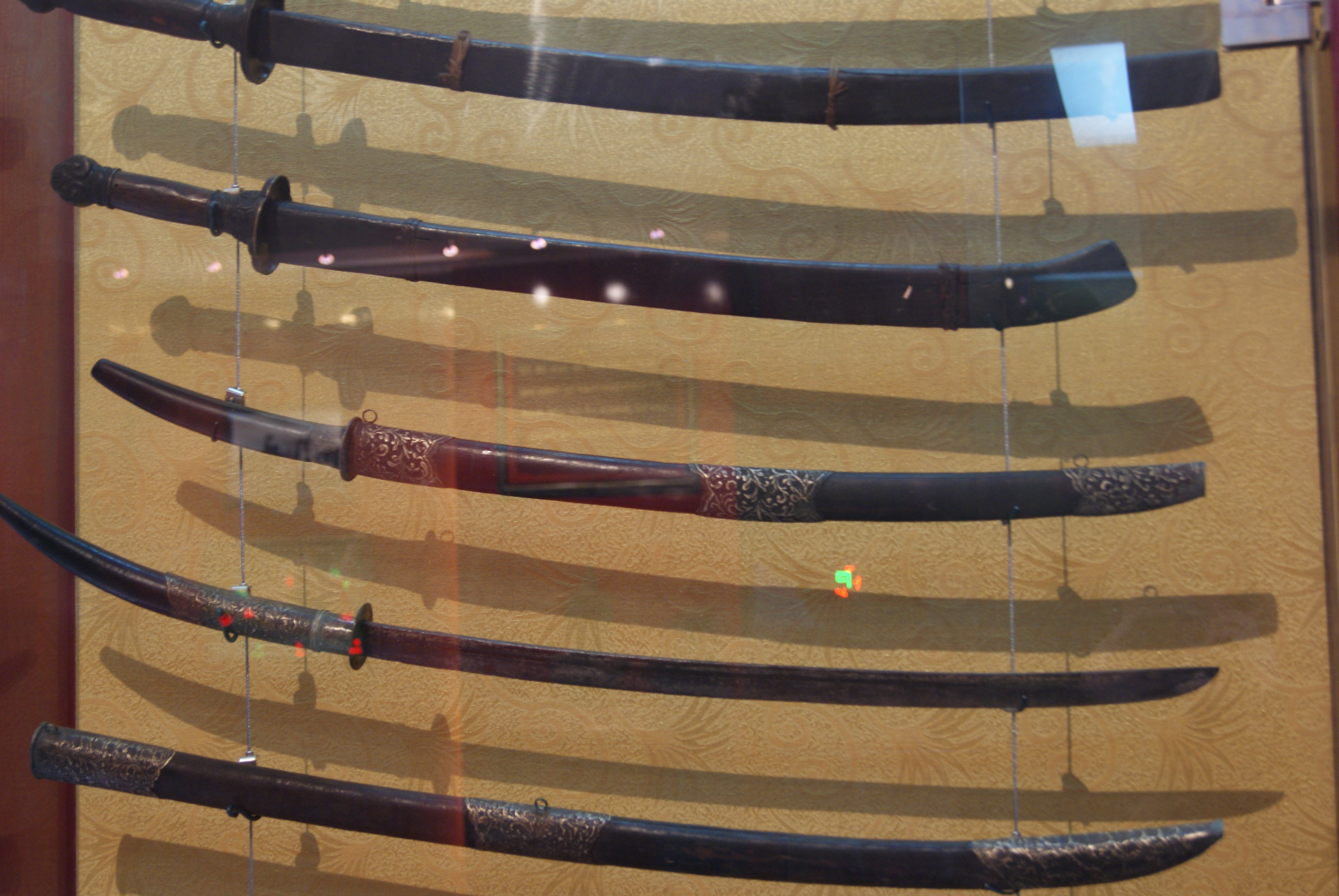
18th and 19th century sabers

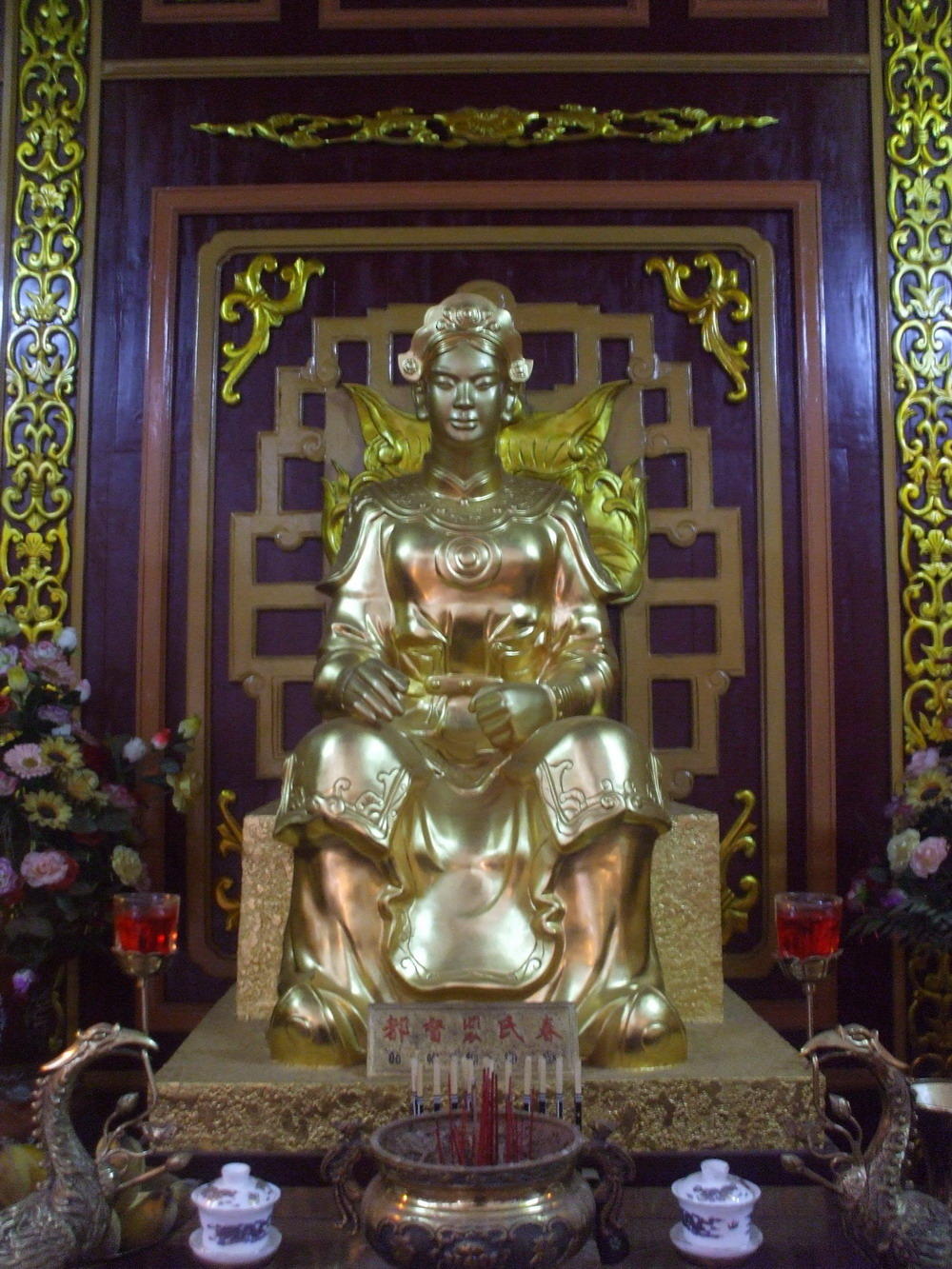
Bùi Thị Xuân, last general of Dai Viet, Tay Son dynasty

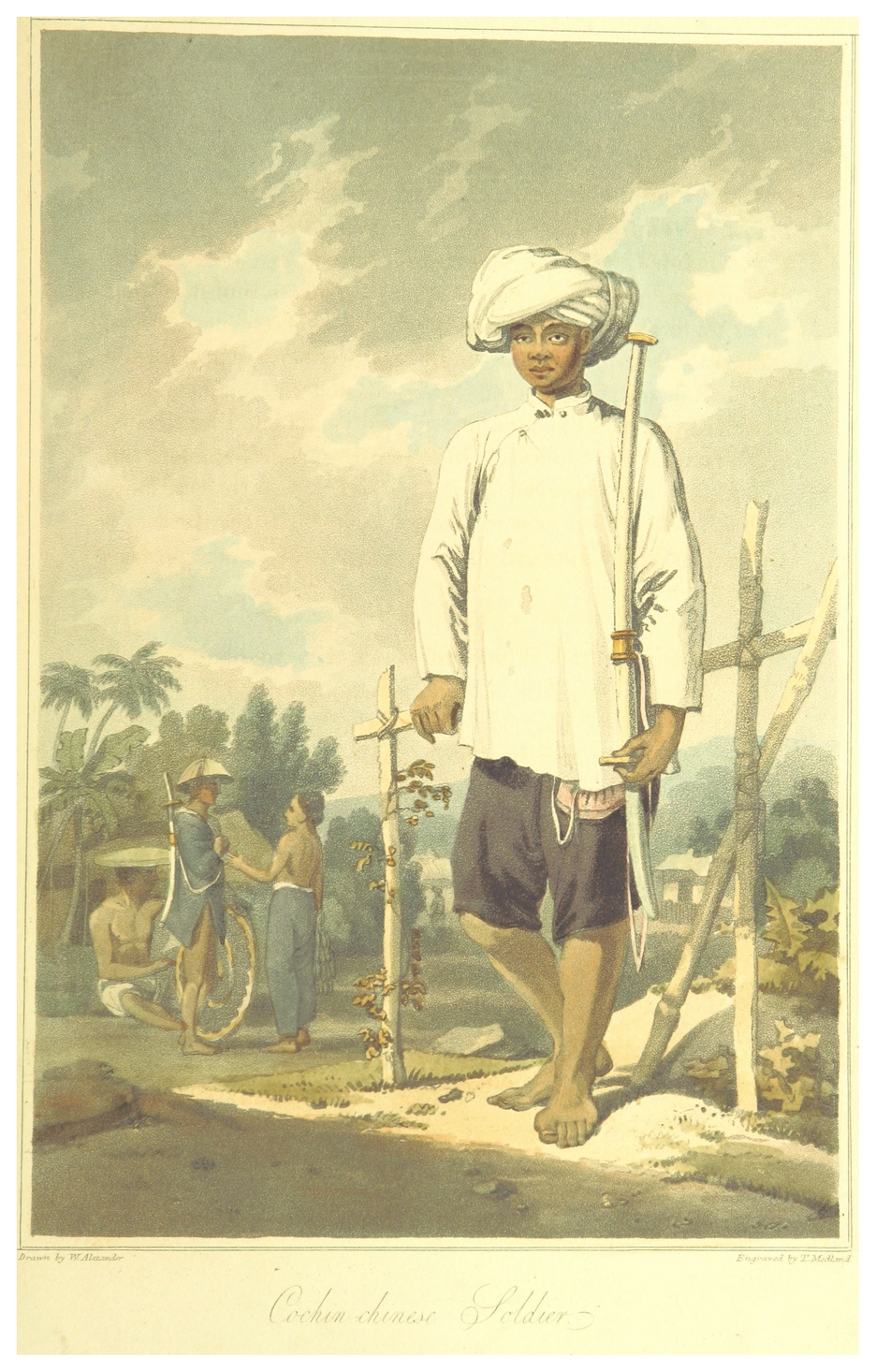
A soldier of the Tây Sơn dynasty in 1793

Pictures of Vietnamese weapons from the Pacification of Tonkin were taken by westerners.

Replicas of traditional bladed weapons serve as decorations in Vietnam.
