= Bình Triệu station =

Railway station in Vietnam

Bình Triệu

General information
- Location: No.1 Kha Vạn Cân Street, Hiệp Bình Chánh Ward; Thủ Đức, Ho Chi Minh City; Vietnam
- Coordinates: 10°49′38″N 106°42′57″E

Services
Preceding station	Vietnam Railways	Following station
Sóng Thần towards Hanoi	North–South	Gò Vấp towards Saigon
Location

Bình Triệu station is a subsidiary station of Saigon station on the North–South railway (Reunification Express) in Vietnam. A high speed line is scheduled for completion to take traffic congestion away from Saigon.

== See also ==
- Saigon station
