= Lê Lai =

Lê Lai was a subordinate commander of Lê Lợi's army during the Lam Sơn uprising against Ming Rule in Vietnam from 1418 to 1427. He is known for sacrificing himself to help Lê Lợi and the Vietnamese army escape from the Ming's blockade, a story that was later known as "Le Lai rescues the Lord" (Lê Lai cứu chúa 黎來救主).

== History ==
=== Joining Lê Lợi's army ===
When Lê Lợi started to assemble his army in 1416, Lê Lai was one of the first men to join. Lê Lai soon became one of Lê Lợi's most trusted men, and during a meeting at Lũng Nhai, Lê Lợi and 18 other men including Lê Lai made an oath to protect Vietnam at all cost no matter what the consequences may be. In February 1418, the rebellion became active after Lê Lợi proclaimed himself king. During this time, Lê Lai was appointed as one of Lê Lợi's subordinate commanders, a position he would keep until his last stand at Chí Linh.

=== Death ===
In April 1418, two months after Lê Lợi proclaimed himself as the king of the Bình Định Province, the Ming army surrounded a troop of Vietnamese rebels that included Lê Lai and Lê Lợi at the Chí Linh mountaintop for ten days. During those ten days, the Vietnamese troops had a shortage of food and water and were falling ill due to the cold weather. Fearing that the troops would soon be crushed by the Ming army and knowing that the capture of Lê Lợi would lead to the end of the Vietnamese rebellion, Lê Lai volunteered to pose as Lê Lợi by wearing Lê Lợi's armor and led an assault with 500 of the remaining Vietnamese troops and two elephants against the Ming army, giving time for Lê Lợi to escape. While his diversion worked, Lê Lai was captured and executed by the Ming army after his troops were crushed during the assault.

== Legacy ==
Due to Lê Lai's sacrifice, Lê Lợi would live to fight the Ming army for nine more years until finally achieving victory and independence for Vietnam in 1427. Despite his life prior to the uprising being largely unknown, Lê Lai is still seen as a symbol of bravery and patriotism in Vietnam. The story of his sacrifice is still told in Vietnam through history books, television, and folktales. After defeating the Ming army and becoming emperor of Vietnam, Lê Lợi declared that if a memorial was ever to be held for him after his death, a memorial for Lê Lai must be held one day before his own as a means of honoring Lai's heroism and sacrifice during the uprising. The memorial for both men are still celebrated in Vietnam today, with Lê Lợi's memorial being on August 22, and Lê Lai's on August 21.

== In popular culture ==
Lê Lai was featured in the video game Age of Empires II HD: Rise of the Rajas.
